= Dapto Smelting Works =

Defunct smelter in Australia

Coordinates: 34°29′41″S 150°49′17.6″E

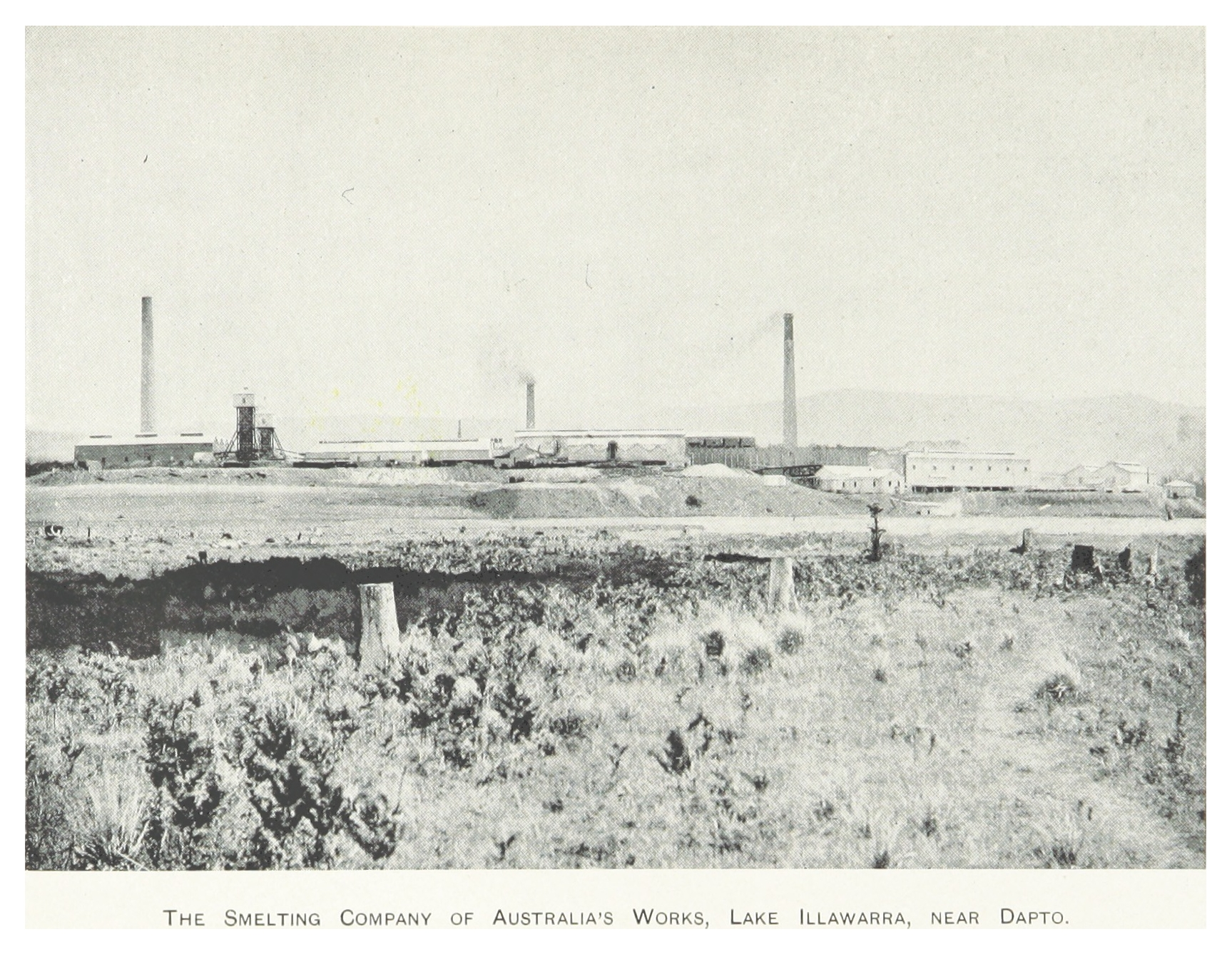
The smelting works (c. 1899)

Dapto Smelting Works, also known as Lake Illawarra Smelting Works, was a smelter for base metals and gold-bearing pyrite and telluride ores, at modern-day Kanahooka, near Dapto, New South Wales. The smelter operated, from 1897 to 1905. It also produced sulphuric acid, some of which it used itself as a reagent. The smelter was established and first operated by Smelting Company of Australia Limited. From 1902, the smelter was owned and operated by another company, Smelting and Refining Company of Australia Limited, until that company went into voluntary liquidation, in 1905. The relocation of smelter operations, to Port Kembla, by then owner Australian Smelting Company, was abandoned in 1908, and was not revived by its successor Australian Smelting Corporation. None of those four companies should be confused with, Electrolytic Refining and Smelting Company of Australia Limited (ER&S), which operated a copper smelting and refining plant at Port Kembla, from 1908. Australian Smelting Company, as referred to here, should not be confused with the nearly identically-named company, Australian Smelting Company Proprietary Limited, that earlier had operated a smelter at Dry Creek, South Australia.

In the years when the Dapto Smelting Works operated, the area where it was located—now Kanahooka—was sometimes referred to as 'Lake Illawarra', but that should not be confused with the modern-day suburb of Lake Illawarra, which is on the opposite side of the lake, to the south of its entrance.

== Historical context ==
=== British capital investments in Australia ===
In the two decades prior to the outbreak of the First World War, British investors were seeking opportunities, outside the United Kingdom. The smelter was one of a number of large investments made in Australia. Such investments, in New South Wales, included Great Cobar mine, British Australian Oil Company, Commonwealth Oil Corporation, Mount Boppy Gold Mine, and the Prince of Wales Mine. A few, such as the Sons of Gwalia mine in Western Australia, were long-lived, fabulous earners, and others like the Mount Boppy were highly remunerative. However, some were financially unsuccessful, and lost their shareholders' investment. The various ventures which controlled the short life of the Dapto Smelting Works were among the failures.

=== Smelting site choices and 'the sulphide problem' ===
Australian base metal mines in the 1890s faced a dilemma over where and how to smelt their ore. The dilemma could be stated in simplistic terms as, 'bring the fuel to the ore or the ore to the fuel'. Essentially, it was a choice between smelting ore at the mine site or at a port or coastal location, especially one near coal mines. John Howell, later a key figure in the Dapto Smelter was an exponent of 'bringing the ore to the fuel'.

The simple ore concentration methods of the 1890s—manual 'picking' and gravity separation—resulted in large amount of gangue material in ore destined for smelting. When smelted, the gangue was separated as slag. Water jacket furnaces were capable of handling large volumes of slag; that made mine site smelting of lower-grade ore seem more viable, provided the mine had a long-enough expected life to justify the capital cost of a smelting operation and the ore was suitable. It was not until the following decade that the development of the froth flotation process, would emphatically alter the balance away from the mine site smelting. Separation using froth flotation, at the mine site, produced high-grade ore concentrates, with much less gangue content, making it more economic to 'bring the ore to the fuel', or even to sell the concentrates to an overseas smelter.

Also during the early 1890s, most mines at Broken Hill were encountering massive quantities of lead-silver-zinc sulphide ore at deeper levels; that type of ore was more difficult to treat profitably, a metallurgical conundrum referred to as 'the sulphide problem'. It appeared that no one process would be a suitable solution, but instead a combination of processes might be effective. The cost of a specialised smelting plant at a mine site was not economic for smaller mines, especially if the ores needed prior 'wet treatment' using chemicals, such as sulphuric acid, and large volumes of water.

In the later half of 1895, reportedly, there was only limited treatment of sulphide ores, in Australia, with much of it being shipped overseas.

=== Gold ores - pyrite, sulphide, and telluride ores ===
Reef gold typically occurred as native gold in a quartz matrix, but sometimes occurred associated with pyrite and sulphide ores of other metals such as copper. In the 1890s extracting the gold from such an ore was often not economic for a small mine. Further, the presence of some metal compounds, such as those of lead and copper, in an ore could prevent use of newer gold-recovery methods such as the cyanide process. Ores would be sent to specialist smelters to recover the gold content, such as Cockle Creek smelter and, once it opened, to the new Dapto Smelting Works.

The Kalgoorlie gold fields of Western Australia encountered another problem, a telluride gold ore, calaverite. In the earlier stage of gold mining, the mineral had been discarded—it resembled iron pyrite, or fool's gold—and was even used for making roads. By 1896, it was recognized as being a rich gold ore (AuTe_{2}). Treating the telluride gold ore, if it could be done profitably, would vastly increase gold production.

In the 1890s, the first stage of the treatment to recover gold from telluride ores involved roasting the ore, which caused the tellurium to form tellurium dioxide leaving a crude form of gold metal behind. The gold metal could then be extracted and refined. Given the value of the gold, it was more economic to 'bring the ore to the fuel'. The treatment of pyrite gold ores also involved an initial roasting of ore. By the 1890s, wet chemical processes such as chlorination and, later, the cyanide process were becoming effective ways of extracting gold from the roasted pyrite or roasted telluride ores.

=== Business model ===
The concept underlying the planned operation of the Dapto Smelting Works was set out in a newspaper interview given, in September 1896, by the first general manager of the Smelting Company of Australia, John Howell. He stated that the lesson of Broken Hill had been that it was cheaper to 'bring the ore to the fuel'. Howell stated that the primary objective of the new plant was to smelt zinciferous lead sulphlde ore from Broken Hill, and to also recover its hitherto troublesome zinc content. He also clarified that, while it was expected that much of the ore would come from Broken Hill, it was envisaged that the new smelter would take ore of various base metals from other sources, allowing continuous operation of the plant and economies of scale.

Howell summarized the anticipated business model of the Dapto Smelting Works, as follows, "You may have the countryside dotted with sulphlde mines, but for them to be worked at a profit, there must be disassociation of the mining from the metallurgical portion of the business.That is the basis of our scheme. We separate mining from the treatment of the ore. We say to the miners all over New South Wales, 'Produce as much base ore as you like. We do not care what it is. We are not particular as to quantity. We will take flve-ton lots, or 50,000-ton lots. You bring the ore to the surface. We will sample it and assay it, and pay you at a specified rate in proportion to the quantities of metals which it contains, and according to the distance which it has to be conveyed by rail or water. You will have a sure purchaser and prompt payment'."

=== Working capital and ore purchases ===
For purchasing the ore a venture using that business model would need a very significant amount of working capital. Further, the venture was critically-dependent on its own ability to sample and assay the ore—with a sufficient level of accuracy—and to have facilities that would efficiently process a wide range of potential feedstock. There was also a potential exposure to downside movements in base metal prices, before the final product was sold.

=== Rail and sea transport ===
The smelting works at Dapto was planned to have connections by both rail and sea. It was connected to the railway network, located close to well-proven sources of metallurgical coal and gave ready access to fluxes, such as limestone and iron ore, shipped by rail. However, it was built in anticipation of the development of a deepwater port on Lake Illawarra, but that port development never materialized. Unexpectedly, the venture would be totally dependent upon rail transport. The Broken Hill lead-silver-zinc ore intended to be the mainstay of the planned production could only be shipped by sea from South Australian ports and then transshipped from a sea cargo to rail, at a relatively distant port, such as Sydney or Newcastle. At that time, there was not yet a railway line to Broken Hill from the New South Wales side and Port Kembla was not yet developed to receive cargo. Dependence on rail freight also limited the smelter's ability to treat low-grade ores, due to freight costs.

The distance from working port would disadvantage the Dapto Smelting Works, relative to the Cockle Creek Smelter, owned by Sulphide Corporation, a company floated around the same time as Smelting Company of Australia. The Cockle Creek smelter commenced operation around the same time as Dapto, and also sought to process lead-silver-zinc ore from Broken Hill. After some initial difficulties, the Cockle Creek smelter operated profitably for many years.

One of the original directors of the Smelting Company of Australia, Mr T.A. De Wolf, later stated, during a select committee hearing in late 1898 that, "If it had not been for the intention to construct that harbor, the present site would not have been chosen for the smelting works." Paradoxically, from 1889 until 1894, de Wolf had been a founding director of Illawarra Harbour and Land Corporation—the company which failed to construct the port, over the period from 1889 to 1902.

=== Planned port on Lake Illawarra ===
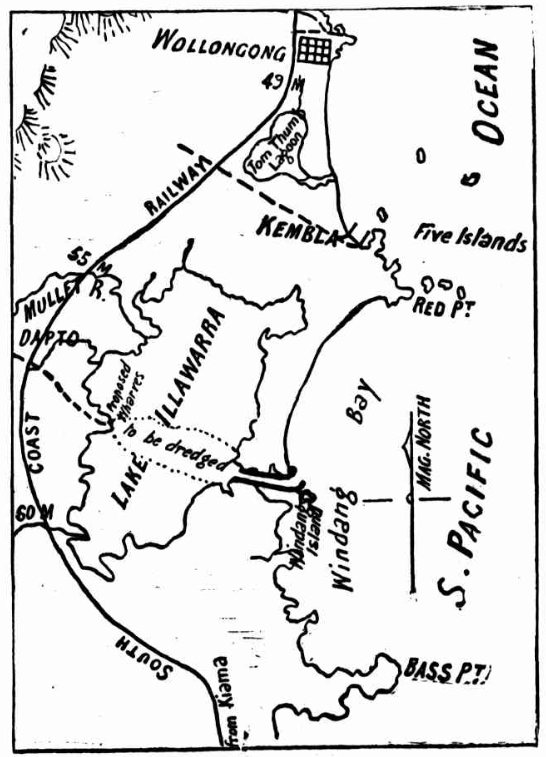
Map of planned port (1895).

A port on Lake Illawarra was to have been developed by a company known as Illawarra Harbour and Land Corporation. Enabling legislation was passed in 1890, and land was purchased on the western foreshore of the lake. Some limited work was done on a breakwater at the entrance of the lake at Windang.

in 1893, Australia entered a serious economic depression, which involved a banking crisis. By 1895, it appeared that the port scheme had stalled. However, in that year, a select committee was told that, while the original purpose had been as a port for coal, there was now a plan to erect a smelter for sulphide ores. One envisaged advantage of the smelter to the port would be that ships would arrive ballasted with ore, for smelting, and depart carrying cargoes of coal.

Further, it was stated that the interests associated with the new smelter would guarantee the debentures of the land company, allowing construction of a railway to the site of the future wharves. The outcome was that the port scheme received further impetus. The Illawarra Harbour and Land Corporation Act Amendment Act was passed, in December 1895, but it set time constraints on completion of parts of the port scheme.

A railway was constructed from the planned site of the 'Ocean View' Colliery to near Elizabeth Point, just to the north of Tallawarra Point, where it was intended to develop the port and a township. The railway crossed, but was also connected to, the Illawarra railway line, a little south of Dapto railway station, around where Fowlers Road crosses the railway line now. It opened in December 1895.

In late 1898, a two select committees—one of the Legislative Council and the other of the Legislative Assembly—struggled to understand the complex ownership arrangements, the relationships between various interested parties, the lack of progress on the harbour works, and the apparent lack of funds, despite the company involved being supposedly well-capitalised to do the work.

Another committee—the Public Works Committee—looking into a port for the Illawarra region, in late 1898, concluded that it would take five to seven years to complete the Illawarra Harbour port; it did not recommend delaying the decision on an alternative artificial harbour at the existing coal port of Port Kembla. The outcome was that the NSW Parliament hedged its bets, passing separate acts that both enabled the Port Kembla harbour works and granted further time to complete the Illawarra Harbour scheme.

However, the dredged channel across Lake Illawarra and the wharves at Elizabeth Point were not constructed, no coal was ever shipped, and the mine and jetty scheme was abandoned in 1902.

== Origins ==
=== Formation of the company ===
One of the foundation directors of the Illawarra Harbour and Land Company, Mr T. A. de Wolf (d.1903), was largely responsible for the formation of a new company, Smelting Company of Australia. He became a member of its board. The formation of the company came about as the conjunction between a 'group of capitalists', known as the Camden Syndicate, and a capital raising from investors in London.

James MacTear (1845–1903)—erroneously called 'James Maclean' in some reports—tested, for the Camden Syndicate, a sample of 800 tons of Broken Hill ore, provided by John Howell in his then capacity as manager of the Broken Hill Proprietary mine. MacTear reported favourably upon it, in September 1895. He had been able to extract most of its zinc content. He also reported favourably on the prospects of a smelter on Lake Illawarra. MacTear was a renowned expert in treating ores, and was president of the Institution of Mining and Metallurgy, London. He was also a consultant prior to the establishment of the smelter.

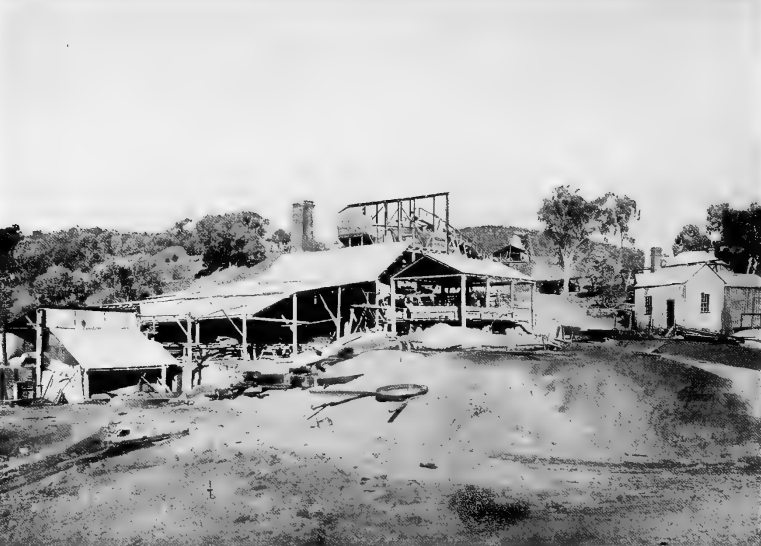
Webb's mine, near Emmaville. One of the assets sold to the new company, at the time that it was floated in 1895.

The Camden Syndicate owned 300 acres of land—part of a 500 acre portion recently purchased from Illawarra Harbour and Land Corporation—at what is now Kanahooka, the sole rights to the 'Marsh and Storer' process in the Illawarra, rights to the Siemens electrolytic zinc process, an option over a colliery, and controlling shares in three small mines in New South Wales. The most significant of these mines was Webb's Silver Mine, situated on Little Plant Creek, about seven miles N.N.W. of Emmaville.

The new company issued £500,000 of capital as £1 shares, but paid £300,000—made up of 250,000 fully-paid shares and £50,000 in cash—for the assets provided by the Camden Syndicate. The remaining 250,000 shares were opened for public subscription in London, and reportedly were 'greedily taken by the public'. That arrangement gave the syndicate an effective controlling interest in the new company and the right to appoint at least two of the seven member board. Since the £50,000 cash payment to the Camden Syndicate came from the public offering, the new company had £200,000 to both fund the smelter construction and provide its initial working capital.

However, including mines, albeit small ones, within the new company's assets—at variance with a publicly-stated business model, based solely on smelting and providing that service to mines— contributed to the controlling interest held by the Camden Syndicate's members. Further, a valuation £300,000 for the mines, 300 acres of land and some process rights, was overly-generous to the vendors; it was in excess of the amount allocated for the construction of the smelter itself. Such an arrangement left the new company both grossly over-capitalised and potentially short of working capital.

The company opened its offices, at 56 Margaret St, Sydney, in October 1895, John Howell being its first managing director.

=== The promoters ===
==== T.A. De Wolf ====
Thomas Andrew De Wolf (d.1903) was living at 'Benare', in Thornton St, Darling Point in September 1888, when his 25-year old wife, Blanche Frances, committed suicide by drowning. He described his occupation as being a merchant. In February 1892, he had successfully defended a charge of conspiracy to defraud, brought by Lismore Municipal Council, involving a gasworks that de Wolf and others had built. He was a member of the Camden Syndicate. Until at least 1893, he was the first managing director of the Illawarra Harbour and Land Corporation. He lived in London for four years prior to 1898, returning on occasion to Australia for business reasons. He died unexpectedly in April 1903.

==== The Camden Syndicate ====
The members of the Camden Syndicate included Andrew Armstrong (c.1842–1921)—a Sydney-based lobbyist, land investor, and manager of land development ventures, such as the one associated with the suspension bridge at Northbridge—Benjamin Josman Fink (1847–1909)—a financier and land speculator, from Melbourne— John Howell (1833–1910)—an experienced and well-known mine manager and smelting expert, with financial interests in various mines—and Thomas Andrew de Wolf (d. 1903). A court case, in 1891, showed that de Wolf and Armstrong had some prior association during the events leading to a large land transaction in 1887.

Apart from Howell, the other major syndicate members had an association dating back to the 'Great Dapto Syndicate', which also sold 2,090 acres of land into another company flotation, that of Illawarra Harbour and Land Corporation. The involvement of these men made the land dealings, leading up to the flotation of the Smelting Company of Australia, what are now known as related party transactions. Further, the apparent market value of the land had been inflated, as it was sold between the various related entities.

The general manager of the Smelting Company of Australia, Weinberg, denied in 1898 that there was a connection between Illawarra Harbour and Land Corporation and the Smelting Company oi Australia, although he stated that "They are not connected, but their interests are identical".

Others were more open about the Camden Syndicate and its links to the other two companies. A newspaper correspondent—one supporting the harbour scheme and smelter—wrote, in March 1897, "although it is not generally known that the Camden syndicate, which formed the Smelting Company of Australia, is a creation of the Illawarra Harbour and Land Corporation, such is the case".

The extent of the relationship between the various entities was revealed in evidence given during select committee hearings in late 1898.

	Great Dapto Synducate	Illawarra Harbor & Land Corporation (IH&LC)	Illawarra Harbour & Railway Corporation	Camden Syndicate	Smelting Co. of Australia (SCoA)	Camden Exploration Company
Key role	Bought Lakelands Estate in 1888, from Patrick Osborne, using a vendor loan.	Set up to establish a port on Lake Illawarra (Illawarra Harbour) Lakelands Estate sold into float of IH&LC by Great Dapto Syndicate.	English domiciled company, established around 1894, and majority owner of IH&LC, by 1898	Promoter of float of SCoA. Bought 500 acres of Lakelands Estate from IH&LC. 300 acres of Lakelands Estate was sold into the float of SCoA, by Camden Syndicate, with other assets.	Set up to establish Dapto Smelting Works. Part of the payment to Camden Syndicate, for assets, was in cash. Part of that cash was used to pay off the original debt owing to Osborne, from the 1888 land purchase (by Great Dapto Syndicate).	Company formed from restructuring of Camden Syndicate, after formation of SCoA. Corporate vehicle to promote mining companies.
Cross-ownership		Controlling interest held by the members of Great Dapto Syndicate, at time of float, without any cash payment being made.	As evidence to 1898 select committee, it held 9,930 of the 10,000 shares of IH&LC, by 1898.	Issued with 250,000 shares of the 500,000 shares of SCoA prior to capital raising at float.	By 1898, SCoA owned 1,000 ordinary and 1,000 preference shares in IH&LC. Part of the cash proceeds were used in 1897, as a security deposit of £10,000 paid to the NSW Government by IH&LC.	Continued to hold shareholding in SCoA (inherited from Camden Syndicate).
Directors and shareholders of more than one entity						
A. Armstrong	Member	Managing Director (in 1898)	Shareholder, £100,000 worth in trust for wife and family, in 1898.	Member	Indirect shareholder, via Camden Syndicate	Probably a shareholder, based on his earlier role in Camden Syndicate
Edmund Barton		Director until 1897			Director in 1897.	
Benjamin Fink	Member	Major shareholder, in 1893.		Member	(Fink's role, if any, is uncertain. Probably, he was not involved.)	(Fink's role, if any, is uncertain. Probably, he was not involved.)
Walter Andrew Harper		Civil Engineer	Director and shareholder		Director by 1897.	Director / Chairman
John Howell				Managing Director	Managing Director and indirect shareholder via Camden Syndicate. After his resignation as general manager in 1898, he remained a director.	Mining Adviser, until around 1899.
T.A. de Wolf	Member	Managing director up to at least 1893	Director and shareholder, £140,000 worth, in 1898.	Member, likely Director	Director and indirect shareholder via Camden Syndicate	Director and shareholder

Having sold assets into the float of the Smelting Company of Australia, the Camden Syndicate, resolved on 12 May 1896 to enter voluntary liquidation and wind up its affairs. The Syndicate then immediately reformed as a new entity, Camden Exploration Company, with John Howell as its mining adviser. The relationship between Howell and the company apparently soured, and in 1899 Howell sued the company for damages for his alleged wrongful arrest under a writ of capias. Camden Exploration appears to have been conceived as a financial vehicle for the promotion of gold mining companies, one such—ultimately unsuccessful—mining venture was Mount Kimo Gold Mining, with its mine near Gundagai. However, its principal investment was in the shares—inherited from the Camden Syndicate—that it held in the Smelting Company of Australia.

== Smelting Company of Australia (1897–1902) ==
=== Directors ===
==== London board of directors ====
The London-based board of the Smelting Company of Australia had as its chairman, William Keswick. The other directors were, Sir John Fowler (died 1898), John Fleming, Walter Harper, Mr Inglis, Mr Manby, Walter Saville, Arthur Wilson, and T.A. de Wolf.

==== Sydney board of directors ====
There was also a local board, John Howell, the company's managing director, Edmund Barton, Thomas Foster Knox (1849–1919), managing director of Dalgety and Co., and Mr. W.M. Noakes, local representative of John Fowler and Co.

=== The smelting works ===
==== Site and layout ====
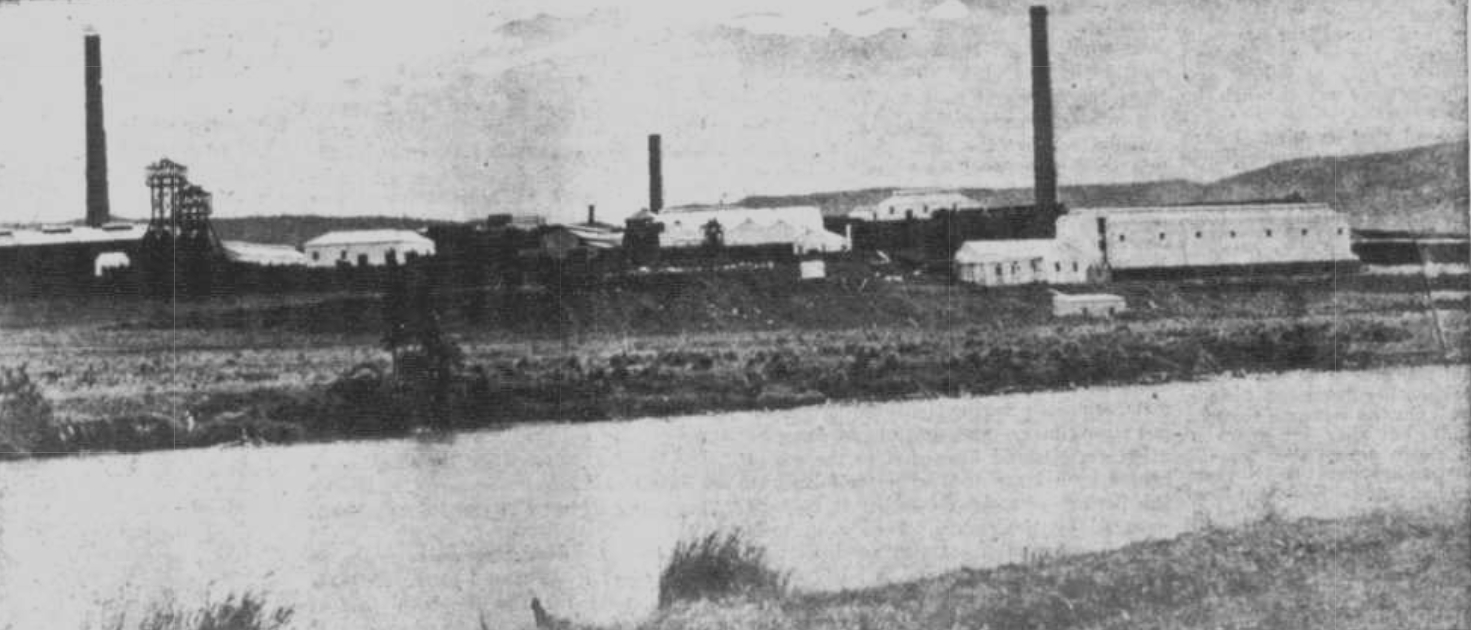
The works in late 1897. Left-to-right, Sulphuric Acid Plant, Offices, Roasting Plant and Blast Furnace Plant, with Mullet Creek in foreground.

The site was on part of the land known as the Lakelands Estate, which was originally owned by the Illawarra Harbour and Land Company. The portion allocated to the smelter was near Kanahooka Point and had frontage to Mullet Creek, which could be used as a source of cooling water.

The site originally had two hills, which were partially levelled and then terraced on their south-eastern sides. Three levels were formed, each terraced using bluestone (basalt) blocks to form retaining walls. The works were then laid out so that use could be made of gravity when moving material between processes.

==== Railway ====
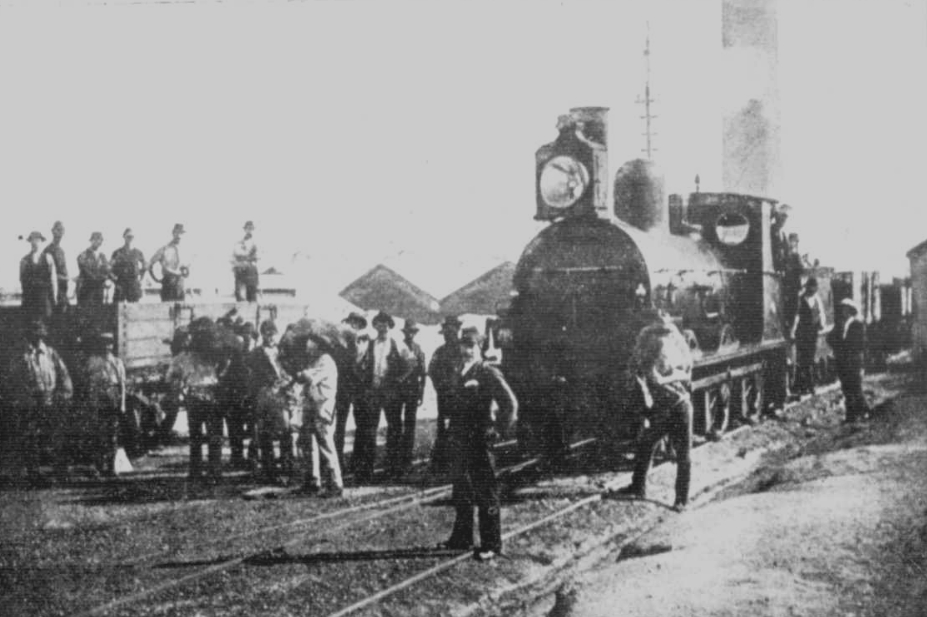
Arrival of an ore train (1900), hauled by 'Murrumbidgee'.

A short rail connection was constructed, linking the smelter site to the Illawarra Harbour and Land Company's railway. It branched from the railway to the proposed port, close to where Fowlers Road now crosses Brooks Creek. The line to the smelter then crossed Brooks Creek, curving to enter what is now Webb Park at its western end, then passing just to the south of what are now the southern boundaries of allotments adjoining the park. It then passed through what is now a curving, narrow strip of land, between Webb Park and a point nearby the intersection of Kanahooka Road and Brooks Terrace, after which it crossed Kanahooka Road and entered the plant.

A locomotive named 'Murrumbidgee' operated over the private railway between Dapto and the smelting works. 'Murrumbidgee' had been owned by the contractor Robert Amos (c.1832–1905), who had used it on various railway construction projects since at latest 1879. It very likely had been used in construction of the railways leading from the South Coast line to the smelter, and then presumably either rented or bought by the smelting works.

==== Construction of the smelting works ====
Construction began in January 1896. and work progressed quickly.

In May 1897, the first furnace was lit, although much of the plant was still under construction. Production began in September 1897.

==== Residential land sales ====
Around the time that the new smelter was nearing completion, an attempt was made to sell 288 sub-divided allotments by "The Illawarra Harbour and Land Corporation, Limited, Sydney, and The Illawarra Harbour and Railway Company, Limited, London". The subdivision was first advertised in December 1896. It was stated to be the 'first subdivision' and the site of "the nucleus of a model city". Advertisements emphasized the proximity to the smelting works and the buoyant prospects for the smelter and coal mines, but made no mention of the port or harbour, except for the word "Harbour" in the two companies' names. The land was adjacent to the smelting works on the southern side of Kanahooka Road; it was styled as "Illawarra City". A report of the auction held on 15 March 1897, to sell the lots was that, "The attendance was good, but bidding was anything but spirited". Only twenty-four lots were reported as being sold. It seems that most of the workers preferred to reside further away from the smelter, in nearby Dapto, which became something of a boom town due to the smelter.

=== Smelting works operations ===
==== Ore feedstock ====
The initial design of the plant was to cater for lead-silver-zinc sulphide ore from Broken Hill, but in line with the business model described by John Howell, the plant also was intended to be able to treat oxide and sulphide ores of various types, theoretically from any mine. The works began operating in 1897 and were in full production by 1899, treating lead, silver, zinc, copper, and gold ores from Broken Hill, Zeehan, Mount Morgan, and Western Australia.

==== Ore purchases ====
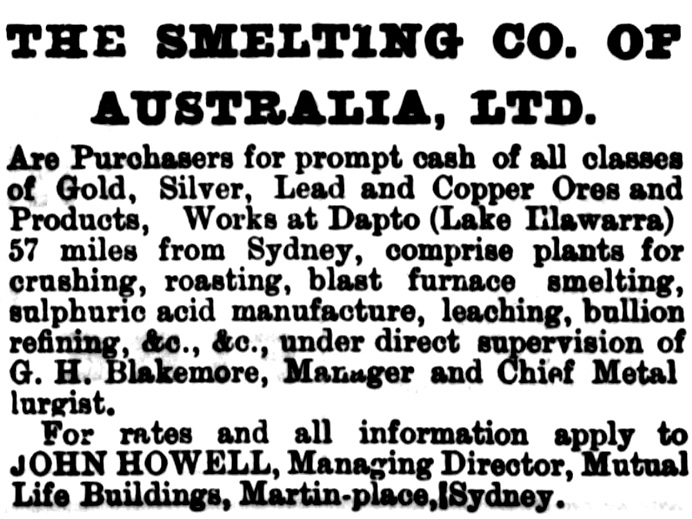
Advertisements similar to this one (March 1898) were placed regularly.

The smelter was reliant upon obtaining supplies of ore to smelt. Under the business model used, the smelter bought the ore and sold the smelted products. A cheque, in full settlement of the ore purchase, would be made available to the seller, within 30 days.

The smelter sought arrangements to smelt ore from mines, on a long-term arrangement, but over its life seemed to have difficulty securing such long-term commitments. Sales staff, such as a Mr Brown who visited Townsville in 1898, toured the country to identify and sign up new sellers. The company also advertised its services in newspapers, especially Daily Commercial News and Shipping List.

Consignments of ore arriving at the works was sampled, resulting in three samples; buyer's, seller's, and a reference sample. The price of the ore was normally settled on the mid-point of the buyer's and seller's assays of their samples, unless disputed. If the assay results were disputed, the reference sample was assayed, and the price determined by the middle assay result of the three samples.

==== Ore receival, sizing, and storage ====
Ore arrived by train. The railway passed over Kanahooka road on a bridge and the line was elevated as it passed over 12 receival bins, which were in two groups, one for sulphide ores and the other for ores not needing roasting. The second set of bins was also used for coke and fluxes, such as iron ore and limestone.

Ore was crudely sized to ensure that the pieces of ore were suitable for subsequent processing, or if required, was sent for crushing.

Ore and fluxes for the furnaces were held in bedding bins that were adjacent the to blast furnace building. Ores that did not need prior roasting would pass directly to this area, after sizing. Low-sulphur ores, coke and fluxes were moved from the receival bins to this area, by manually-propelled skips running on elevated tracks. Ores that had been roasted would also be stored there for subsequent smelting.

Receival of gold ores would be done separately, due to the smaller amounts of ore and its higher value. Gold ore was usually delivered in sealed bags.

Ore receival and storage

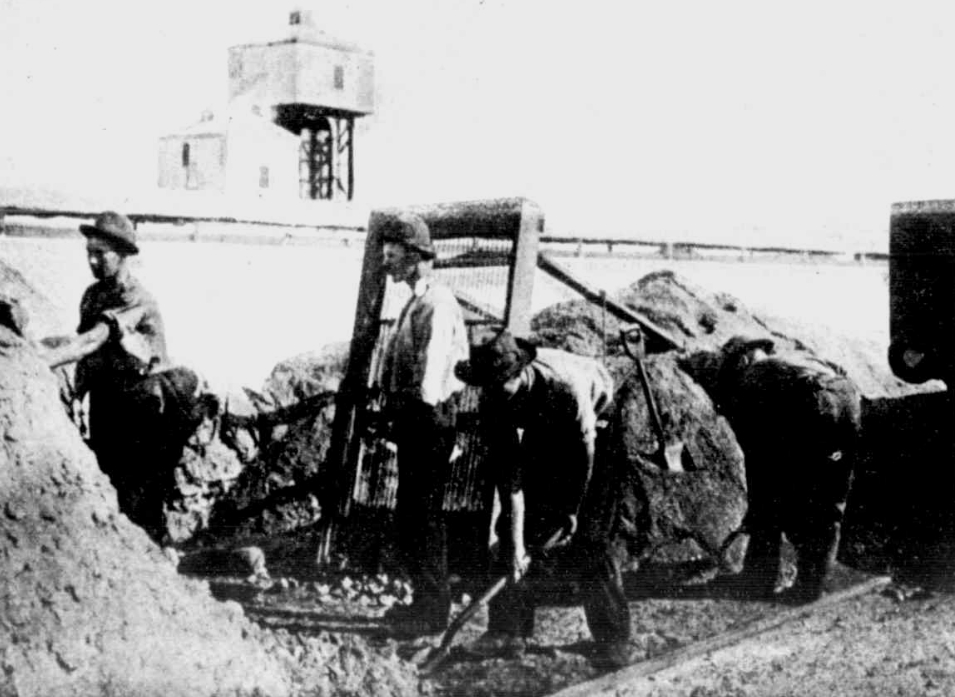
Screening Chilean ore (1900)

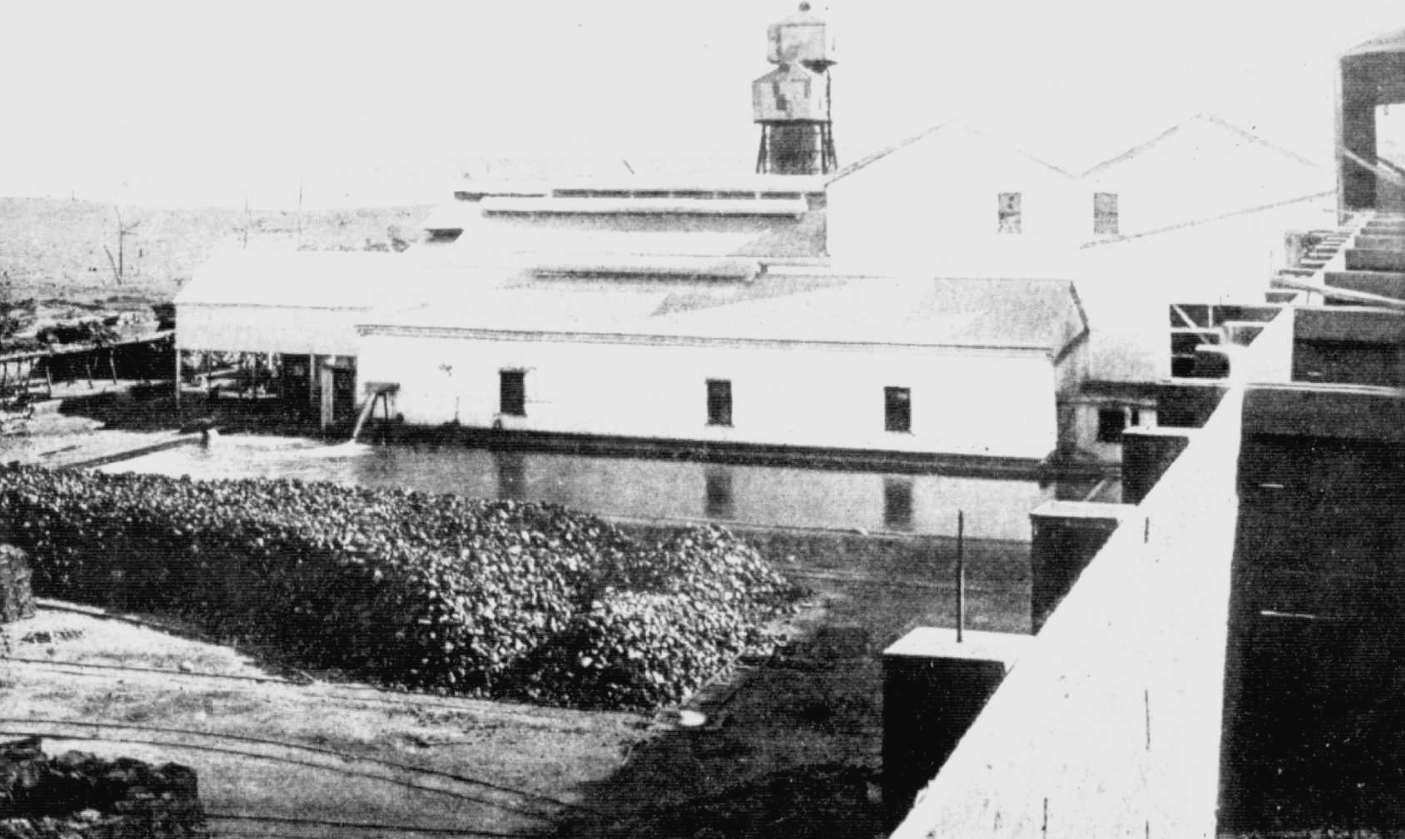
Roaster and acid plant, with stockpile (1900)

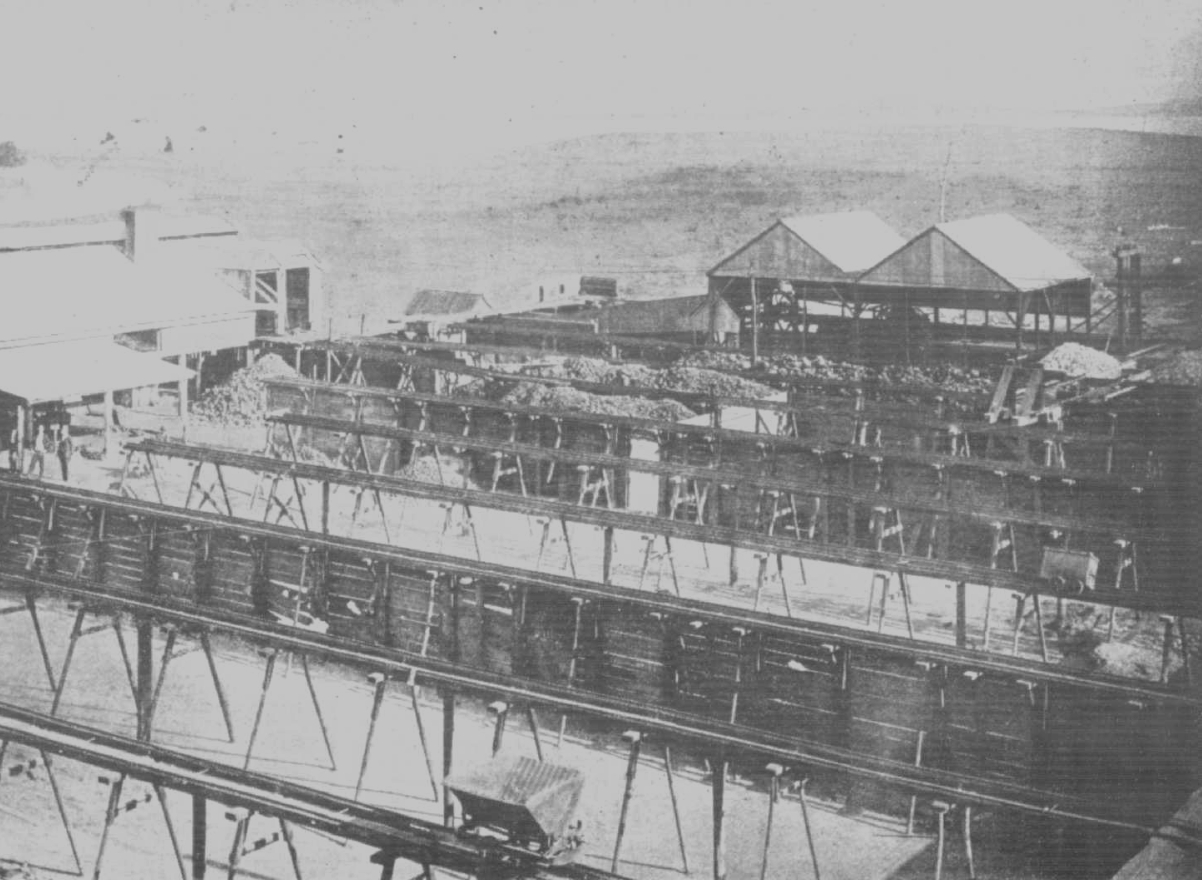
Bedding and feed floors for smelting furnaces (1900) A skip is visible in the foreground.

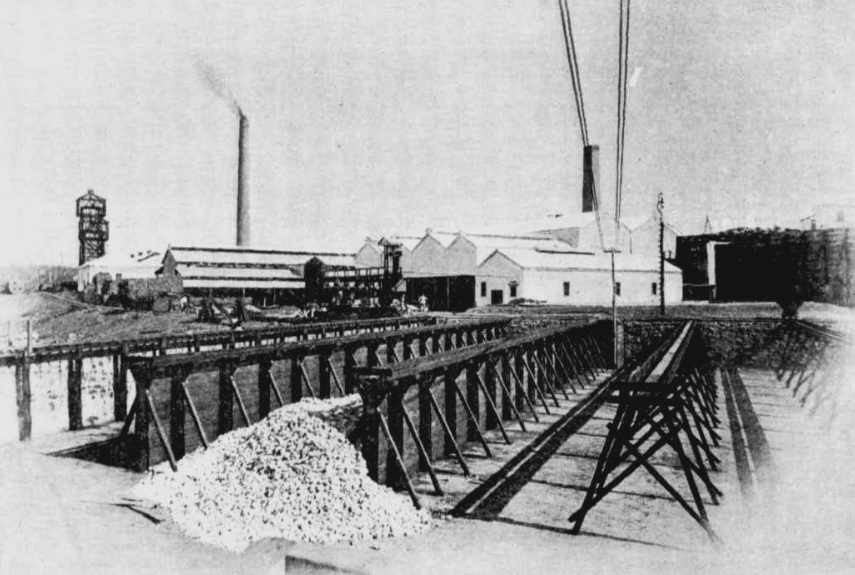
Another view of storage for furnaces (1897)

==== Assay office and sampling ====
When ore was delivered to the works, a portion of it was taken for sampling and assaying, with the rest being taken to storage. The sample ore was crushed to fine particles, thoroughly mixed, quartered and further divided, until a representative sample has been obtained. That sample provided by the sample house was then dividend into three: one for the buyer (subsequently analysed at the works), the second for the seller (allowing them to perform an independent assay of their own), and the third, which was sealed as a reference in case of a disputed assay. Some customers set up their own assay facilities to carry out their part of the testing arrangement, such as that of the Western Australia Associated and Horseshoe Companies, at nearby Brownsville.

Many mines of the time sent bulk samples to the smelter, and so obtained a quotable reference value for the recoverable metallic content of their ores, whether or not those mines continued to use the smelter subsequently.

Sampling and assaying

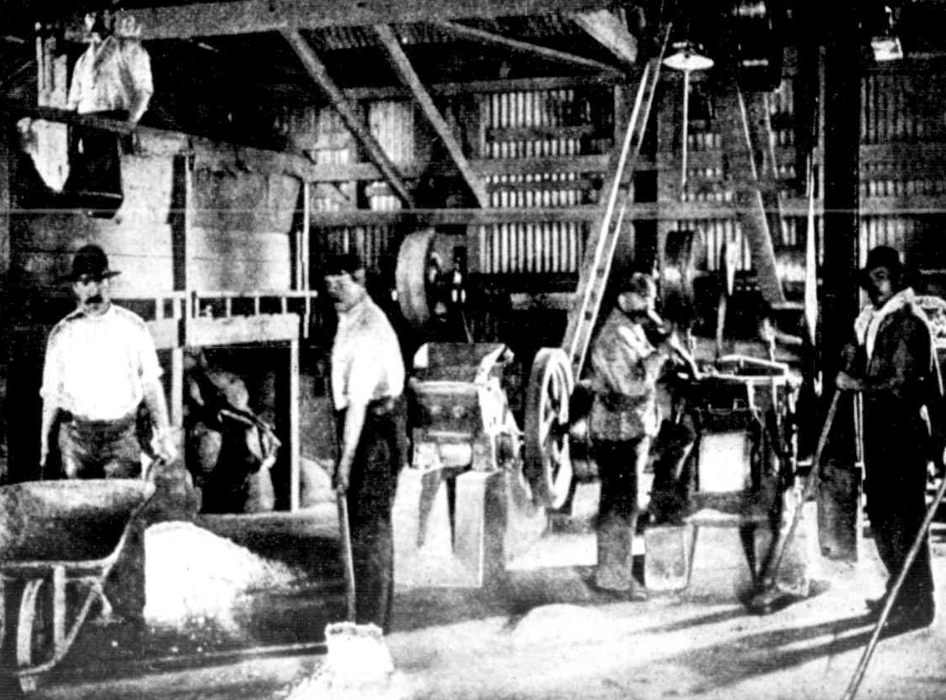
Sample house (1900)

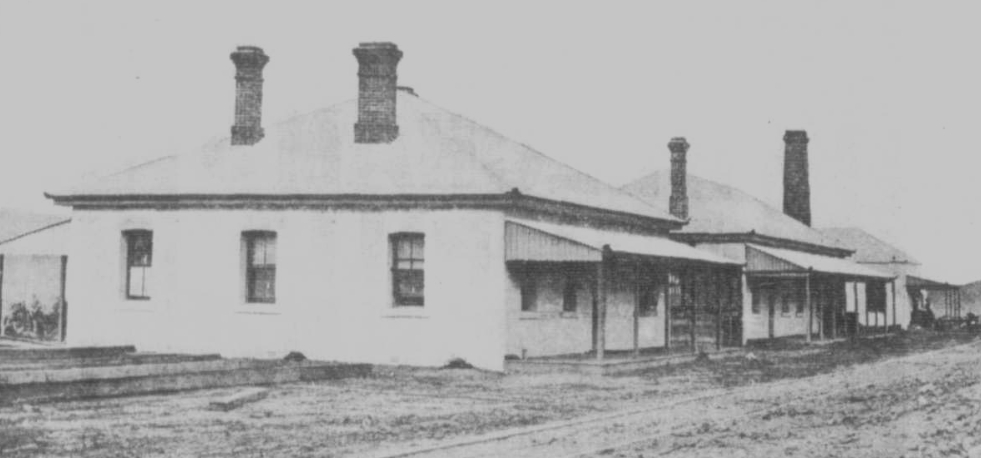
Left to right, Offices, assay building, and store (1897)

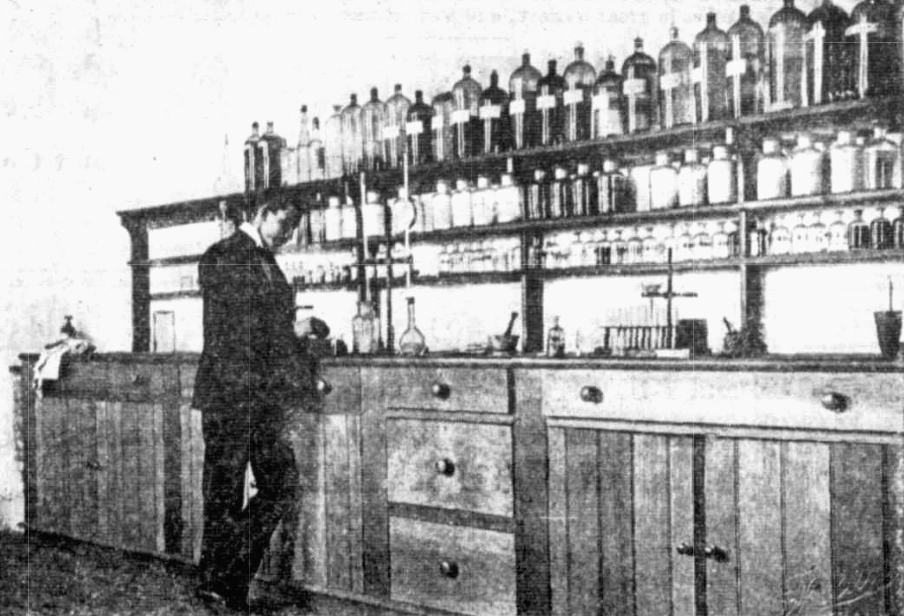
Inside the laboratory (1897)

==== Roasting and 'slagging' (fusing) furnaces ====
The roasting plant comprised three Gates crushers, two Kron (or Krone) rolls, with trammels and elevator for handling the crushed ore, and three revolving roasting furnaces.

Finely crushed ore was fed automatically into the brick-lined roasting furnaces— 25 ft long and 6 ft in diameter—that revolved slowly. These funnace had a slight incline and the ore gradually moved along their length as it was roasted. Lead ores that needed slower roasting were roasted in ten reverberatory furnaces, where the ore was 'rabbled', manually turned over, to expose the ore to the hot gases inside the furnace.

The resulting roasted fine ore, although now 'de-sulphurised' was not suitable for smelting in a blast furnace. It was subsequently processed in a 'slagging' or fusing furnace, resulting in larger particles of ore, which could then be smelted.

The machinery in the plant was driven, via shafts and belts, from a 250 indicated horsepower condensing compound steam engine.

==== Smelting furnaces ====
The blast furnace building contained three water jacket furnaces; two lead smelting furnaces with a capacity of 125 tons per day each and a copper smelting furnace—from Atlas Engineering Company—of 80 tons per day. Below the blast furnaces, a lead-silver refinery was under construction in June 1897. In the meantime, the plant produced lead-silver bullion, produced by molten lead-silver alloy being poured into moulds when tapped from the furnaces. A flue, 900 foot long, carried gases from the furnaces and refinery to a 161 foot high chimney stack.

Blowers for the water jacket furnaces were powered by a 250 h.p. John Fowler compound condensing steam engine.

Key differences between the operation of the lead and copper smelting furnaces were that the lead furnaces consumed roasted ore (as oxide compounds) and reduced the ore to make molten metal, whereas the copper furnace consumed sulphide ore, which it oxidised to make molten copper matte. Both furnaces also produced slag, which was typically composed of various silicate compounds depending upon the composition of the ore and the fluxes used.

Smelting furnaces

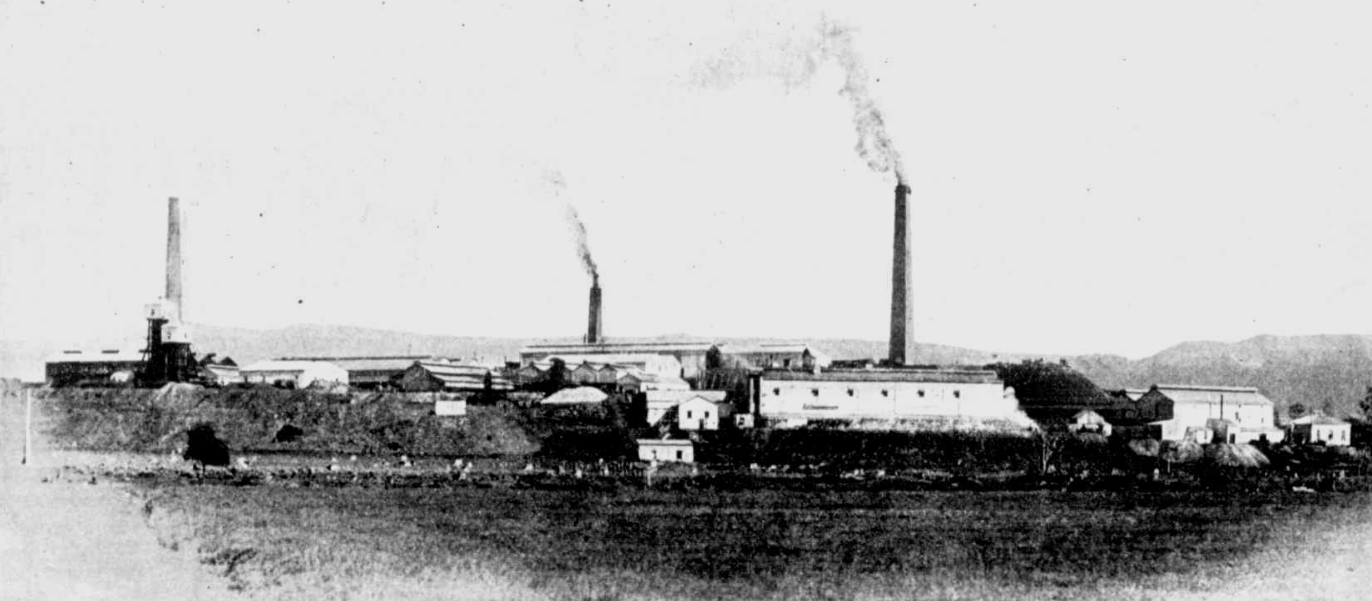
The Dapto Smelting Works in 1900. The tallest chimney (on right) is the smelter chimney and the building in front of it is the smelter building.

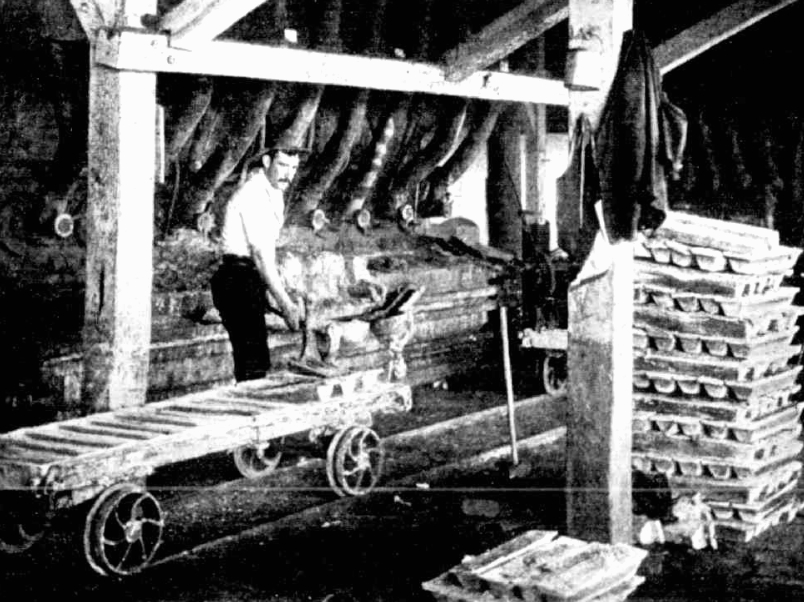
One of the 125 ton lead furnaces (1900), with lead or lead-silver bullion that has been cast, using the ingot moulds on the trolley.

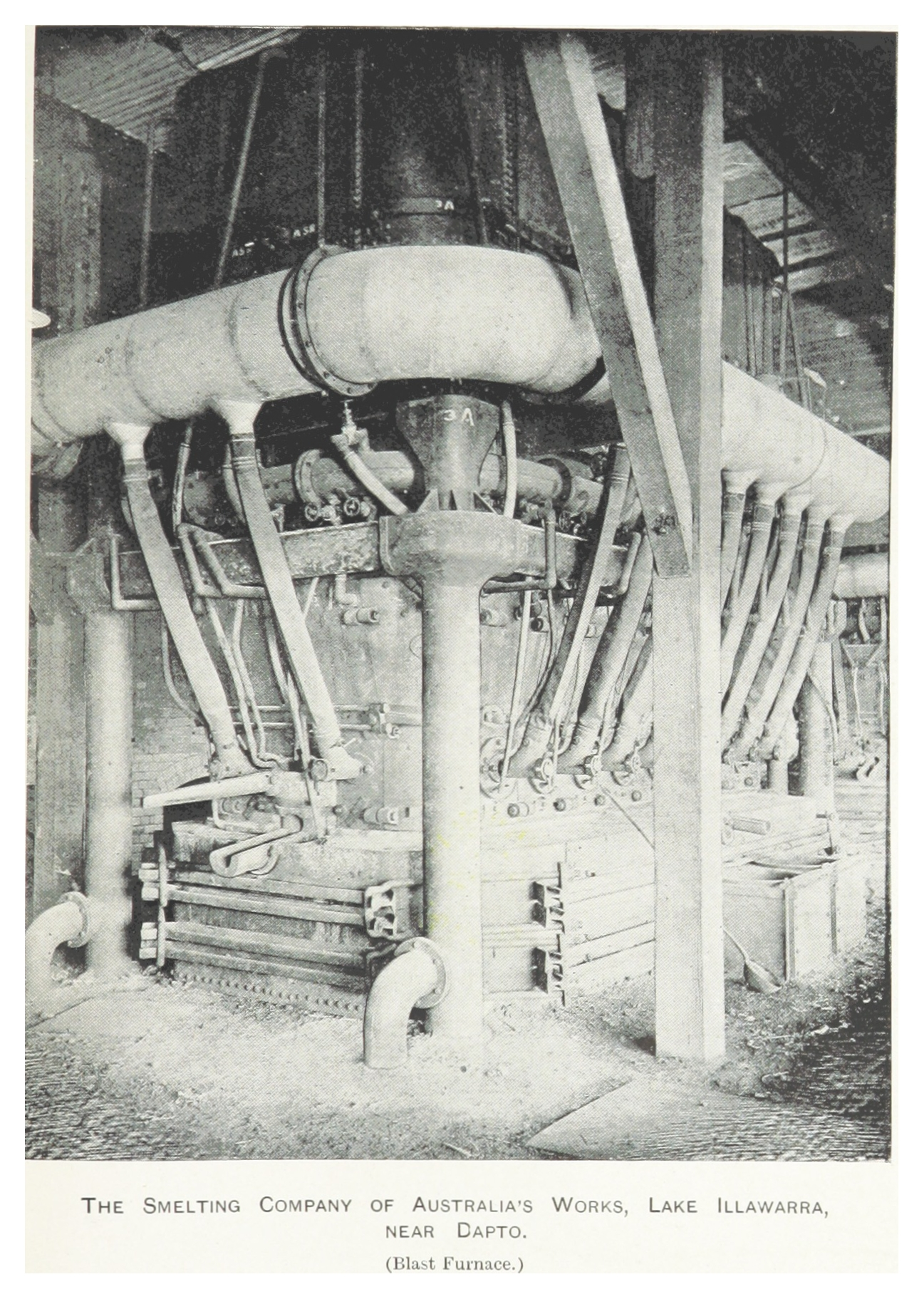
Base of water jacket furnace (1899). This is the 80 ton copper furnace

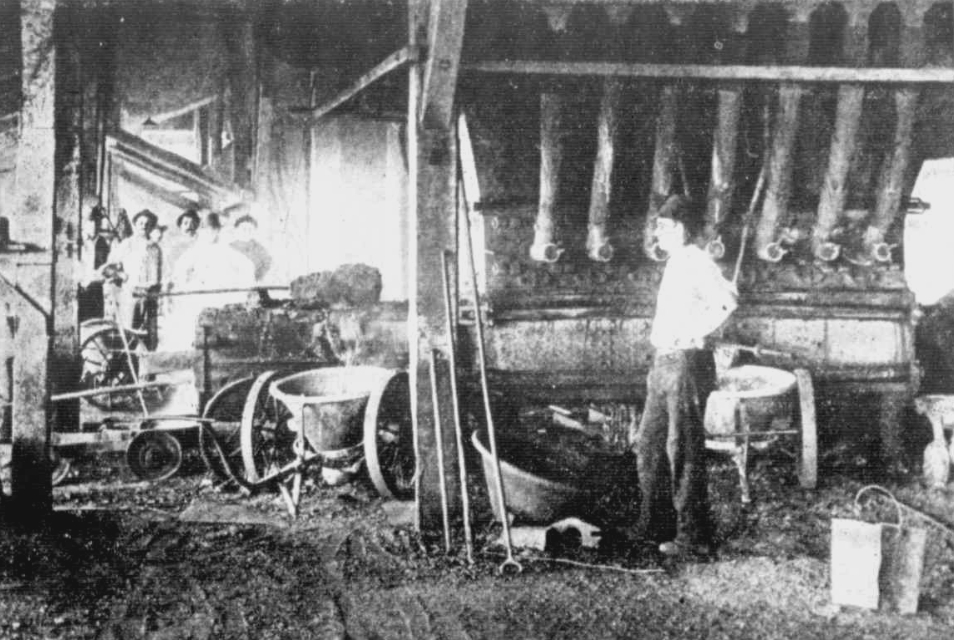
80 ton copper furnace (1900), also showing ladle pushcarts used to hold the copper matte that would be run off from the tapping spout.

==== Furnace cooling water and slag handling ====
The water jacket furnaces needed a large amount of cooling water. The cooling water was salt water drawn from Mullet Creek, which passed through water jacket once. The expelled cooling water was, for normal operation, directed onto the hot slag, shattering it into small pieces which were 'carried away' by the water. Slag pots were provided to be used under abnormal conditions. The slag ended up in a slag dump at the north-east edge of the plant. Much of the slag in the dump was later identified as having been tipped there in molten form.

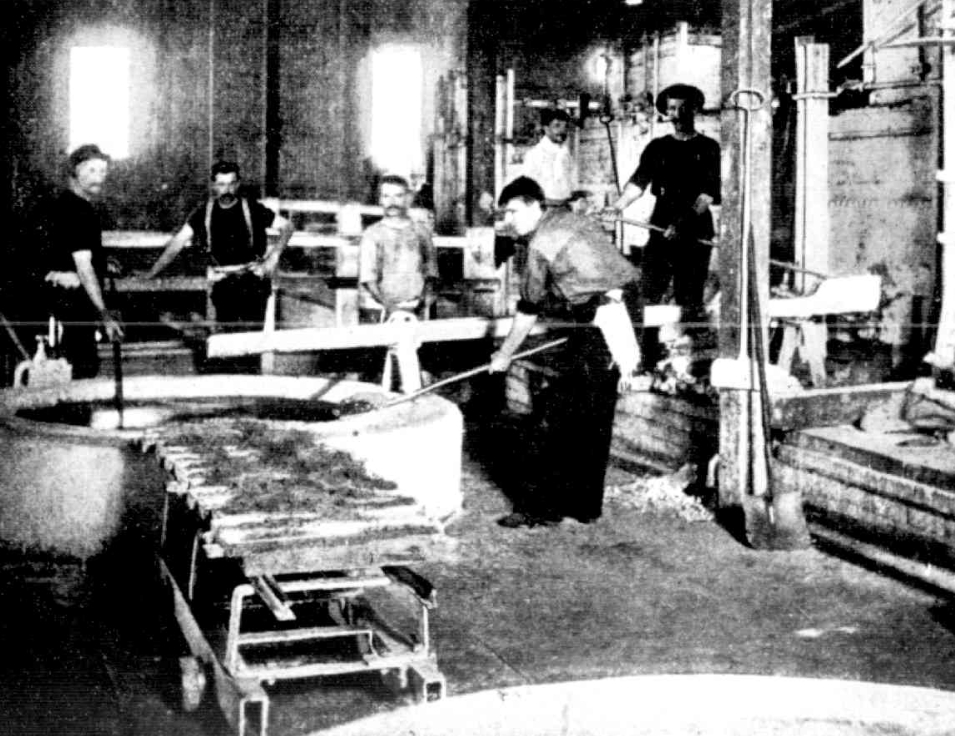
Interior of refinery (1900). Lead is being refined (refer to text).

==== Refinery ====
The Parkes process was a method of recovering silver contained in lead bullion using zinc metal. The refinery contained reverberatory furnaces, large steel vessels known as 'kettles', and cupelling furnaces.

The crude lead-silver bullion produced by the water jacket furnaces was 'softened' in a reverberatory furnace to remove other content such as antimony, tin and copper. The molten metal was run into large steel vessels known as 'kettles'—holding around 20 tons of molten metal—which were heated by coal fires.

Zinc metal was added to the molten lead-silver metal in the 'kettle'. Silver in the molten metal became associated with the zinc, As the lead was cooled—but not to the point of crystalisation—the zinc-silver rose to the surface as a scum of zinc-silver-lead, which could be removed and collected for recovery the valuable silver content.

The lead, now devoid of silver, was then siphoned into another 'kettle' where it was blown with dry steam to oxidise any remaining zinc content. The resulting surface scum of zinc oxide and lead oxide was skimmed off. The lead metal was then cast into 'soft lead' bullion as a finished product.

The zinc-silver-lead scum was heated gently, in either a reverberatory furnace or another 'kettle', to drive off much of the lead. The resulting dry alloy of zinc-lead-silver was then retorted, using a Faber de Faur distilling furnace, to drive off the zinc metal as a vapour, which was captured either as molten metal, in condensers, or as zinc dust. The remaining silver-rich silver-lead alloy was then refined, in an English cupelling furnace. An air blast was applied to oxidise the remaining impurities, resulting in nearly pure silver metal. The refined molten silver was then either granulated, by being poured into water for subsequent remelting, or cast directly into bullion.

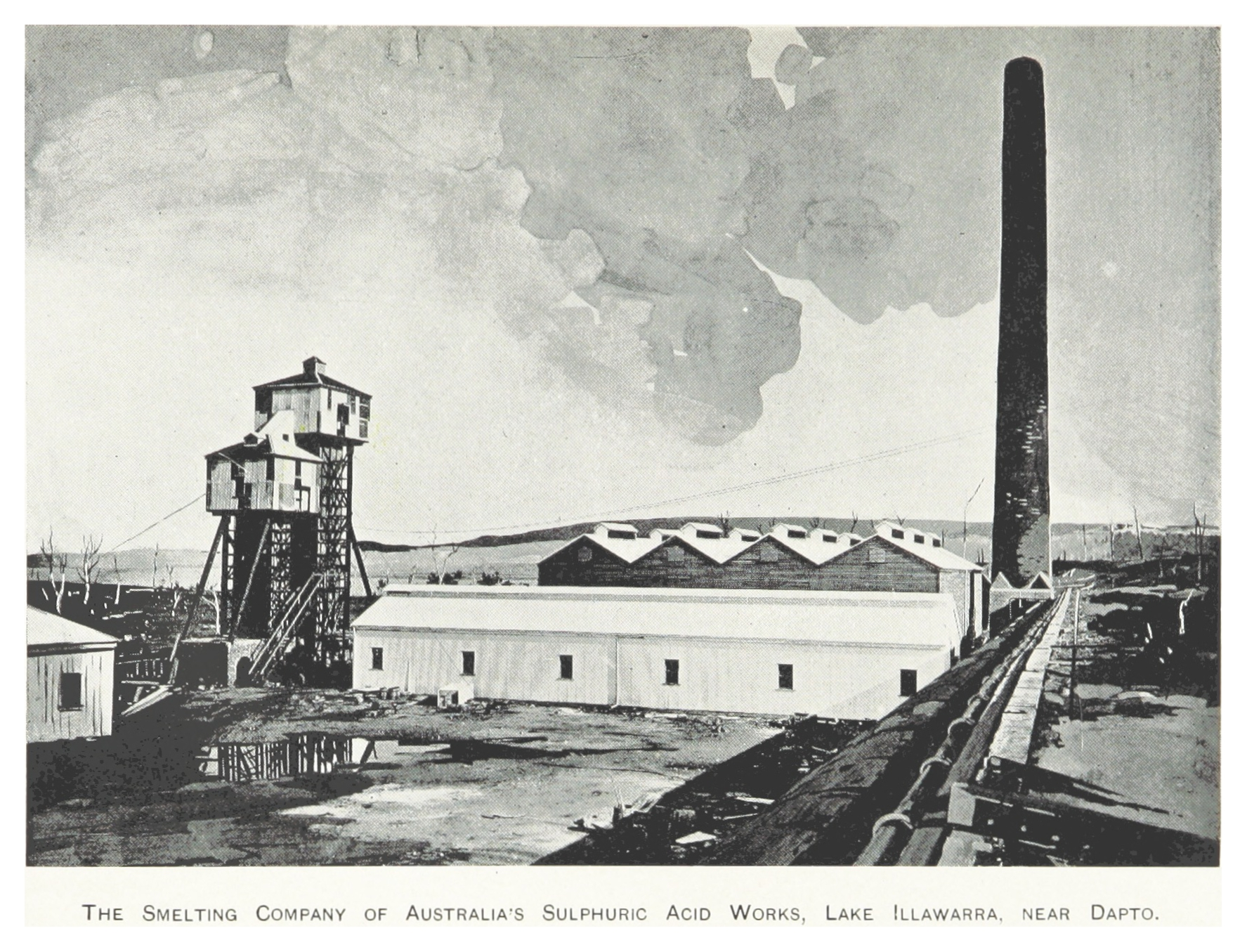
Acid plant in 1899. The higher of the two towers is the Gay Lussac tower and the shorter is the Glover Tower. The four peaked rooves are the lead chambers.

==== Sulphuric acid plant ====
There was a sulphuric acid plant, which used what was called the lead chamber process. There were thirty pyrite burners, which delivered sulphur fumes to four lead-lined chambers, 120 feet by 20 feet by 19 feet, where a reaction took place. There were two lead-lined wooden towers—a Gay Lussac tower, 80 feet high and a Glover tower, 55 feet high—which were filled with coke and flint rocks, respectively. In these towers the output from the lead chambers was converted—in two stages of chemical reaction—to strong sulphuric acid. Off gases passed to a chimney. The acid was then cooled and stored. The plant was expected to make 7,000 to 8,000 tons of sulphuric acid per year.

Much of the sulphuric acid was to be consumed, in the recovery of zinc from roasted lead-silver-zinc ores. Roasted lead-silver-zinc ores were treated with sulphuric acid, resulting in a zinc-rich leachate solution. The remnant roasted ore, now devoid of its zinc content, was smelted to recover the other metals. Surplus acid was sold to customers including Elliot & Co, a.k.a. Elliot Brothers.

==== Zinc oxide plant ====
Originally, it had been planned to then recover the zinc content, from the leachate solution, using the Siemens and Halske electrolytic zinc process. However, it seems that an electrolytic refinery was never built. Instead the works produced zinc oxide from the leachate solution, referred to as 'liquor'. The remnant roasted ore, now devoid of its zinc content was smelted.

The zinc oxide plant had 12 vats for precipitation of zinc oxide (actually zinc carbonate). The process used was the patented Marsh-Storer process. Magnesite, imported from Greece, was added to the leachate solution in these vats, as a precipitating agent. After the insoluble zinc salt precipitated, the remnant was a solution of magnesium sulphate ('Epsom salt'). The precipitated zinc oxide then passed to filter presses for separating out the remaining liquid, and then was dried. The plant also included a set of quadruple effect evaporators—presumably for recovering the magnesium sulphate as a by-product—tandem compound Johnson air compressors, Wheeler surface condenser and pump, an air receiver, and six mechanical mixers for the precipitating agent. Zinc carbonate produced in the process could be decomposed to yield zinc oxide, by heating it.

==== Gold recovery ====
The smelter had a business in the extraction of gold from refractory ores, both pyrite (or other sulphide ore) containing gold and gold telluride ores.

Gold ores came from various New South Wales mines, including those at Mount Dromedary, on the South Coast, and Mount Drysdale, north of Cobar. The mines of Kalgoorlie, Western Australia were sources of telluride ore.

Treatment of the ores involved first roasting the ore. For pyrite ore the roasting was to drive off the sulphur. For telluride ore, the roasting was to decompose the telluride compounds (e.g. AuTe_{2}), releasing the gold and causing the tellurium to become tellurium dioxide.

==== Fuels ====
The smelter required coke for its water-jacket furnaces—particularly for reducing lead-oxide produced by roasting—and coal to supply its boilers, reverberatory furnaces, and for process heating.

Coke came from the Australian Coke Company, which was near where the Prices Highway crossed the railway from Mt Kembla. This plant was later relocated to Corrimal, becoming the Corrimal Coke Ovens.

A right to mine coal at the Ocean Steam Colliery had been sold into the float of the Smelting Company of Australia. The Illawarra Harbour and Land Corporation had constructed a railway to its site in 1895. However, tests on the coal, made in 1896, revealed it to be inferior. Mining did not begin, rendering this part of the line essentially useless. Instead the smelter bought coal from mines in the Illawarra district, of which there were many.

==== Fluxes ====
Various fluxes were necessary to produce slags that carried impurities but not the metals which were the product of smelting. To some extent, the use of fluxes could be reduced by blending ores with different characteristics, but in reality the works needed fluxes.

Iron ore was needed as a flux, to remove silica in the form of iron silicate slag. Other fluxes included gypsum and limestone.

==== Auxiliary plant and services ====
===== Electricity =====
Electrical power was provided by a 75 h.p. steam engine coupled to a 300 kW, 16 cycles per second alternator. Around the time that it started, the works had six arc lamps of 1,000 candlepower and 130 incandescent lamps of 16 candlepower, with a capacity to run up to 300.

===== Water =====
A small creek on the smelter site was excavated and dammed to form a freshwater reservoir of 18,000,000 gallon capacity. In the plant there was also a water tank holding 120,000 gallons of salt water. In April 1897, approval was given for construction of a freshwater dam, 11.5 acres in size, on Harris Creek at West Dapto, four miles from smelter, at the base of the mountain range, intended to hold 40,000,000 gallons, but it seems never to have been built.

Saltwater from Mullet Creek was used for cooling the water-jacket furnaces. Saltwater was drawn from a channel running to Mullet Creek. At the western end of that channel, there was a building containing the saltwater pumps and the condensing equipment for the steam engine driving the blowers for the furnaces.

===== Stables =====
There was a building containing stables to house the works' horses.

==== Production at smelter ====
The works began operating in the third quarter of 1897 and were in full production by 1899, treating lead, silver, zinc, copper, and gold from Broken Hill, Zeehan, Mount Morgan, and Western Australia. The smelting works were busy for several years, employing 500 men at peak.

The first furnace was started on 6 September 1897. From then, until 30 June 1900—around 33 months—the company purchased and processed 73.718 tons of ore, containing 267,992 ounces of gold, 1,543,943 ounces of silver, 18,138 tons of lead, and 1,223 tons of copper.

In the next month, July 1900, the works treated 4,693 tons of ore—2,580 tons being Broken Hill silver-lead ore—producing 1,017 tons of bullion and matte, containing 4,191 ounces of gold, 88,281 ounces of silver, 1,016 tons of lead, and 110 tons of copper, showing an upward trend in production.

==== Expansion of operations c.1900 ====
It seems that the plant was expanded under Weinberg's management, around 1900.

=== Management (1895-1902); Howell, Blakemore, Weinberg, and Morse ===
Smelting Company of Australia's four managers were all major figures in the industry of their day, with extensive experience in smelting.

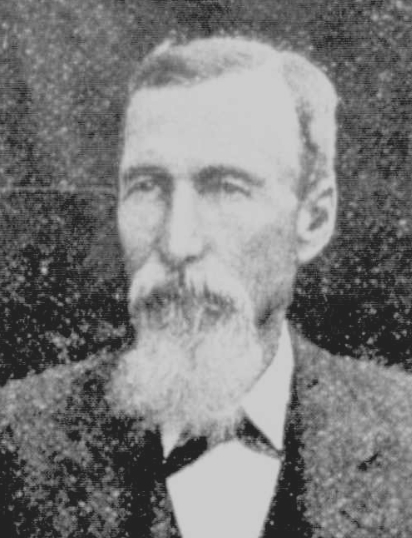
John Howell c.1901

John Howell (c.1833–1910), was a Canadian-born naturalized-American mining engineer and well-known mining industry figure. He came to Broken Hill to be the general manager of the British Broken Hill mine, in 1889, and later managed the Block 10 and Broken Hill Proprietary mines. He left Broken Hill in 1895.

Howell was a member of the Camden Syndicate and subsequently became the first managing director of Smelting Company of Australia, during the years that the Dapto smelting works were designed and constructed, and—as a member of the Camden Syndicate—he had a major influence on it and its business model.

Howell was known for his fascination with solving difficult metallurgical problems, and was an acknowledged expert in smelting of complex ores. He apparently failed to foresee the risk and adverse consequences of the Illawarra Harbour port scheme not proceeding; as late as February 1898, he was still stating—at least publicly—an expectation that the deepening of the new harbour would be completed within twelve months.

Howell resigned, in May 1898, to pursue his private mining interests, but remained a director. Among the other mining ventures in which he was involved, he established and managed the Conrad mine, on a mining claim that he had bought in 1897. The mining village that grew up near that mine was named Howell, after him. He also continued an association with a later incarnation of the Camden Syndicate known as Camden Exploration Company, as their mining advisor, but had fallen out with them by 1899.

George Henry Blakemore (1868–1941) was born, at Copperfield—a copper-mining village that is now a ghost town, four miles south-west of Clermont, Queensland—where his father managed a copper mine. His own career began in Broken Hill, as an assayer, in 1888. He was later metallurgist of the British Broken Hill mine, subsequently an assistant manager at the Broken Hill Proprietary mine, and eventually was in charge of its eighteen smelting furnaces.

In 1895, he married John Howell's younger daughter. Blakemore subsequently was associated with various ventures, in which his father-in-law was also involved. He was in charge of the erection of the Dapto Smelting Works, and later was the works manager in charge of its operation. He later was, briefly, general manager of Smelting Company of Australia, from May 1898, when his father-in-law resigned from that position, until his own resignation in June 1898.

Although he managed various other mining and smelting ventures thereafter, he is best known for his involvement with mining and smelting around Cobar. From 1901, he was mine manager of the Great Cobar mine, and later was its general manager, between 1905 and 1909, years of a huge expansion of the Great Cobar's mining and smelting operations. In 1905, he established the C.S.A. Development Syndicate, to take over the then moribund CSA Mine, at Elouera; it subsequently became a major mine in the Cobar region, until its untimely closure due to a fire in 1920. He was later on the board of New Occidental Gold Mining Company Limited, operator of the New Occidental Mine at Wrightville.

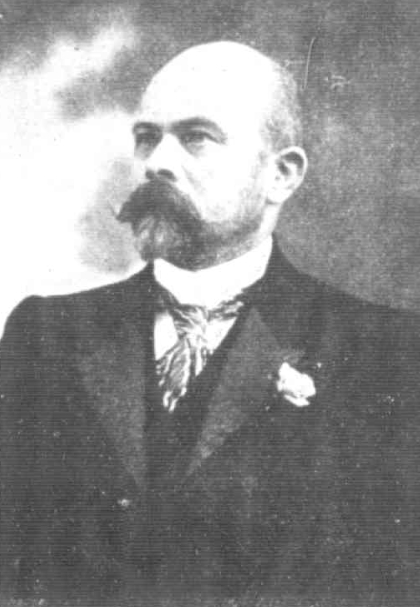
Weinberg in 1900.

Ernest Ludwig Adolph Weinberg (1855–1925) was a German born and trained metallurgist. Weinberg had been the managing director of Queensland Smelting Company, which ran a smelter at Aldershot, near Maryborough, Queensland. Before that he had been a manager at Anaconda Copper, in the United States He became general manager of Smelting Company of Australia, in June 1898.

While Weinberg seems to have operated the Dapto Smelting Works competently, his management of the company, Smelting Company of Australia, is questionable. In August 1900, shareholders complained that they had not seen any accounts or reports of operations, since 1898. The company reportedly reduced its margins during his management in order to obtain sufficient ore, almost certainly a factor in the financial difficulties in 1901. Although Weinberg was not personally involved, corrupt behavior of company employees, involving fraudulent sampling, was uncovered in 1900. Thousands of pounds in excessive payments for purchases of gold ore were made and were never recovered.

He resigned in April 1901. Weinberg then become general manager and chief metallurgist of Chillagoe Railway and Mining Company. He later resigned from that post, but remained involved with the Chillagoe smelters, as a consultant. He died in New York in 1925.

Phillip Sidney Morse (1859–1953), an American, briefly managed the smelter, after the Weinberg's departure. After graduating in 1883 from the Massachusetts Institute of Technology, he had worked in smelting in the American West, before coming to Australia. Seemingly well-regarded and described as 'quiet and efficient', his time managing Dapto was curtailed by the change of ownership and management in May 1902. From September 1902 until 1914, Morse was manager of Cockle Creek Smelter, and during that time important modifications and extensions to that rival plant were made. He then returned to America. Morse was succeeded at Dapto by another American, W.L Hoyt, appointed by the works' new owner, Smelting and Refining Company of Australia.

=== Difficulties ===
==== Losses on gold and sampling conspiracy trial (1900–1901) ====
It was alleged that two employees working the sampling house had 'salted'—fraudulently added gold to improve the assay result—samples of gold ore, over a lengthy period. The payment made for the bulk ore depended upon the assay result.

The two employees, Alfred Faulder and James Harvey, and the two men who consigned the ore to Dapto, Thomas Mooney and George Axam, were committed to trial on changes of conspiracy to defraud, in October 1900. Mooney was defended by—notorious corrupt alcoholic politician, lawyer, and erstwhile proprietor of Truth—William Patrick 'Paddy' Crick (1862–1908).

An analysis revealed an apparent amount of gold 'lost' of 2,848 ounces, by which time Axam had been paid for 3,630 ounces. Gold was £4 to the ounce at the time. The works assayed the slags from each of its furnaces, twice every 24 hours, and therefore had a good handle on the amount of gold going into the slag, which was subsequently mainly recovered, by reprocessing.

Evidence was given that the two employees, Faulder and Harvey, seemed to be living beyond their means, and that Harvey, using an alias, had sold a parcel of very rich gold ore, alleged to have been the company's property, to the Cockle Creek smelter for £280.

The ore was kept in bins, and the identity of the seller was known to the sampling house workers. During the trial it was revealed that Mooney had purchased quartz from a mine—'Big Hill' mine, near Batemans Bay—that had produced gold, but historically at grades significantly less than the values of the samples in question. The mine owner stated the prices Mooney paid; 7 shillings per ton for 30 tons of ore already lying on the surface, and £2 10s. per ton for another 100 tons extracted from the mine to fill Mooney's order. Two assayers from the smelter gave evidence of the assay values of specific numbered samples of the ore; all assays showed a remarkably high gold content.

A closely controlled resampling of a parcel of Axam's ore, carried out by the company in the absence of Faulder and Harvey, resulted in an assay of just 5 dwt of gold per ton, far less than the earlier ones of the same ore that ranged as high as 6 oz 6 dwt and 3 grains. How the gold was introduced into the samples was unknown—the defence called several witnesses who stated that they did not see the Harvey, Faulder, or anyone else 'salting' the samples—but theories were that it was carried in the men's pipes or between their fingers. The works were processing a lot of very rich Western Australian telluride gold ore at the time, and bags of this very rich ore were later found hidden in a swamp to the west of the works.

Axam, Mooney and Faulder, were acquitted. The jury foreman even went as far as to state that, "the jury thought negligence had been shown in the management of the company's affairs, and although great losses have occurred there was no evidence before the jury to in any way connect the accused with them". Axam later sued the company, for £500 in damages, unsuccessfully.

The jury was discharged and then Harvey, having pleaded guilty, was brought forward for sentencing, with the judge remarking:

"You have pleaded guilty to a crime which may seem small to you, but it is a very grave crime indeed. It appears by the evidence in this case that this company has been defrauded of very large sums of money, and you have been in the swindle all along. I think it very unfortunate, indeed, that the others, whoever they were, have not been brought to justice. I do not intend to give you a heavy sentence, and I hope it will be a lesson, and that when you come out you will reform your ways. It appears from the evidence that it is not the first time that you have been guilty of a fraud, because something came out about you getting £200 worth of gold, and taking it up to Cockle Creek. You are sentenced to one year's imprisonment with hard labor."

The company had paid around £12,000 too much for what was almost barren ore—it never recovered the overpaid amount—substantially reducing its precious working capital. Weinberg resigned as general manager, about a month after the verdict was given.

==== Competition for ore ====
An ongoing issue for the Dapto Smelting Works was to secure enough ore to keep the plant working. A later report stated the smelter resorted to 'price cutting', reducing the margin it took, to secure ore, toward the end of Weinberg's management.

===== Overseas smelters =====
There were large smelters in Britain, Germany and Belgium, which smelted Australian ores. However, by the 1890s, the huge increases in production from the Broken Hill and Tasmanian mines led to a lack of competitive pricing from the overseas smelters, leading the mines to look for other outlets.

===== Australian smelters =====
Dapto had been set up mainly to smelt lead-silver-zinc ores from Broken Hill. It was not the only off-mine smelter, in Australia, that was using a 'custom smelter' business model based buying ore from mines and then smelting.

There was a smelter at Dry Creek, near Adelaide, South Australia. from late 1887 until it closed in September 1900. Dry Creek was connected to Port Adelaide by the Dry Creek-Port Adelaide railway line, providing access to a port. Its business model seems to have been similar to that of the Dapto Smelting Works. It took ore from mines at Broken Hill, although there was no northern railway connection at that time. When it opened, the smelter had an association with the Junction Mine at Broken Hill, a mine later associated with the Dapto Smelting Works. One of the directors of the Dry Creek smelter's operator, Smelting Company of Australia, was John Cash Neild; by 1898, he was a director of Illawarra Harbour and Land Corporation. After the Dry Creek smelter closed, the Junction Mine became a potential source of ore for the Dapto Smelting Works, and it would play a role in the change in ownership of 1900–1901.

Another smelter was the Queensland Smelting Company's smelter at Aldershot, near Maryborough, Queensland, which operated from 1890 to 1906. It was mainly set up to smelt copper ore from Queensland mines, but also took ore from as far away as Zeehan, in Tasmania.

The British Blocks Company set up a smelter at Port Pirie, in South Australia, in 1889. Another of the Broken Hill mines, BHP, bought that smelter in 1892. Port Pyrie was connected by rail to Broken Hill. Port Pyrie had an advantage that ore delivered there from Broken Hill, by rail, did not need to be shipped by sea, before being smelted. There are still lead smelters at Port Pirie.

Cockle Creek Smelter opened was opened by Sulphide Corporation in 1897. It was intended to process large quantities of tailings containing zinc ore that had been stockpiled at Broken Hill. It began using an electrolytic method known as the Ashcroft process. The process did not scale well, and was a failure, despite much effort. However, by 1902, the smelter was producing zinc, using ore roasting and distillation of the zinc vapours, as well as smelting lead in conventional blast furnaces. After the initial difficulties, the Cockle Creek smelter operated profitably for many years, closing in 2003.

==== Improvements in mine site technology ====
The gold mines of Kalgoorlie had developed to be large mines, by the turn of the century. Mines, such as the Kalgurli Mine, which set up a large treatment plant at the mine, no longer needed to send their ores to be treated in 'custom smelters' such as Dapto Smelting Works. From around 1901, instead of being roasted, telluride gold ores could be treated by an enhanced cyanide process, known as the Diehl process after its inventor, Ludwig Diehl.

Smelting of sulphide ores from Broken Hill still left a small but significant amount of metal lost with the slag. During the first decade of the 20th Century, froth flotation was developed and refined, largely at Broken Hill. That wet separation process, produced high-grade ore concentrates, almost devoid of gangue material and separated by mineral type, that did not necessarily suit the then existing smelting techniques.

==== Size, capacity, and location ====
Despite its impressive appearance, the plant had a relatively low smelting capacity. Even if there had always been sufficient ore to smelt, the plant would struggle to operate profitably, especially if the ore being treated was of a lower grade.

Bringing its ore from the wharves in Sydney by rail put the smelter at a disadvantage, particularly regarding the smelting of lower grade ores.

==== Sulphuric acid plant ====
The company had built a large and expensive sulphuric acid plant. For whatever reason, this plant was 'not long in operation'. In 1903, the sulphuric acid plant was described as a 'veritable white elephant'.

== Change of ownership (mid 1900 - mid 1902) ==
=== Change of control (1900) ===
In mid-1900, control of the Smelting Company of Australia passed to an entity known as Smelting and Harbour Syndicate Limited.

On 29 June 1900, an extraordinary meeting of shareholders of the Smelting Company of Australia was held in London. A resolution was moved to approve an earlier provisional agreement, which gave the Smelting and Harbor Syndicate, Limited the option of "acquiring the good will and the greater part of the assets of the company". At the meeting to approve the option, one shareholder complained that he had received no report of the state of operations since 1898. Another shareholder complained that he had not received a notice of the meeting, which might explain the low attendance. The motion was carried 29 to 6.

=== New company ===
In November 1901, a new company, Smelting and Refining Company of Australia was floated in London. Its share capital, of £650,000, was divided between 150,000 7% cumulative preference shares and 500,000 £1 ordinary shares. Its purpose was to acquire the Smelting Company of Australia and its assets, as a going concern, and to amalgamate those with its parent company, Consolidated Nickel Mines. The vendors, Smelting and Harbor Syndicate Limited, received the 150,000 7% preference shares, as payment for the assets. The new firm also assumed the liabilities of the old one, totalling £107,640, including £103,036 owed to Dalgety & Co. Limited. The sale also included the controlling interest in 'Webb's mine'.

A deed was signed, on 28 October 1901, the date of the sale contact was 29 January 1902, meaning the new company agreed to take over the liabilities of Smelting Company of Australia and the smelter assets from that date. However, the sale was not actually approved by the shareholders of Smelting and Refining Company of Australia, until April 1902. The management of the new company arrived to take over operations, during May 1902.

The new company's board did not include any of the Camden Syndicate members. The London-based directors were; Sir Thomas Salter Pyne (1860–1921)—Chairman of the board and a former Chief Engineer of Afghanistan while working for the Amir of Afghanistan, Abdur Rahman Khan, from 1884 to 1899—Mr. T. F. Read—a director of Taropaca Waterworks Company, operator of a desalination plant in Taropaca, Chile, and a company associated with John Thomas North, and his nitrates empire—and Mr. Reginald Ward—a merchant, of Ward, Armstrong & Co., The fourth director was the company's 'local advisor', former Western Australian politician and recently retired, Agent-General for Western Australia, Sir Edward Horne Wittenoom (1854 – 1936).

Prior to being Agent-General for Western Australia in London, Wittenoom had aroused controversy; his name had appeared as a director on the prospectus of Western Australian Smelting Company, while he was still Western Australia's Minister for Mines.

Although there was no overt involvement by the Camden Syndicate, directors of the old company were there in the background. The following commentary, from November 1901, opines that the new company was not set up on a sound financial basis, suggesting yet again vested interests were being served, by an inflated valuation of new company with an excessive allowance for goodwill:

"The present company, that has just been formed to take over the business, is called the Smelting & Refining Company of Australia, Limited. It has been formed by Mr. Salisbury-Jones and his friends, but many of the shareholders and directors of the old company are supporting him by underwriting shares. The capital is £650,000 in 150,000 preference shares of £1 each and 500,000 ordinary shares of £1 each, besides which there is £100,000 in debentures. The preference shares are now being offered for subscription in London, and of these two-thirds have already been underwritten. The terms of purchase are somewhat complicated, owing to the old company having debentures and other debts to wipe off. The new debentures go towards wiping out the old ones, but there are many debts that have to be paid off in cash, so that there will be very little capital left to start actual operations on and to buy ores with. It is a remarkable fact that “good will” is represented in the purchase price to the extent of £284,750. An unsuccessful company that has landed in debt does not usually charge for good will. "

=== End of Smelting Company of Australia ===
On 31 July 1902, shareholders of the old company, Smelting Company of Australia, resolved to enter voluntary liquidation. The fate of the original buyer of its assets, Smelting and Harbour Syndicate Limited, appears to be unrecorded, but coincidentally, the Illawarra Harbour port scheme was abandoned around the same time in 1902.

== Smelting and Refining Company of Australia (1902–1905) ==
=== Changes ===
==== New management ====
The new general manager was another American, W.L Hoyt. He took over in May 1902, and other key management positions also changed at that time. The new company engaged A.A.Blow as its consultant.

===== W.L. Hoyt =====
W.L. Hoyt had been superintendent of the Ross Mining & Milling Company's, Silverton Smelters, in Colorado, He remained manager of the Dapto works from May 1902 until the company ceased operations. Subsequently, from July 1907, he was general manager of the Tasmanian Copper Mining Company, in South Australia. At the time, that venture was erecting a custom smelter at Leigh Creek, best known for coal mining, but with copper mines nearby. By the end of October 1908, that smelter and its spur line were dormant.

===== A. A. Blow =====
Albert Allmond Blow, was manager and later owner of the Silver Cord Mining Company in Leadville, Colorado. It had been his idea to build the Yak Tunnel. The Yak Tunnel served both to provide drainage for the deep mines and as underground haulage to transport ore from multiple mines to a mill near the mouth of the tunnel. The tunnel's earlier name was the Blow Tunnel. He was a wealthy man and consulting mining engineer, and was married to Jennie Goodell Blow (1860–1935). Blow visited the Dapto Smelting Works, at least twice, reportedly staying for three or four months around October 1903. During that long visit he gave an interview to the press, presenting a positive outlook for the smelter.

==== Concessions from NSW Government ====
The new company was able to obtain reductions in rail freight costs, for both coal and ore. It also obtained the complete removal of wharfage charges for Broken Hill ore and other New South Wales ore that was landed in Sydney, and a reduction in wharfage charges for ore from other places. The immediate effect was an increase in the amount of ore arriving at the smelter, reportedly, 50 to 80 rail wagon loads per day.

==== End of the Illawarra Harbour port scheme ====
The reduction in rail freight and wharfage costs was a timely development. The Illawarra Harbour port scheme was quietly, but finally, abandoned around mid 1902. The crossing of the Illawarra railway line by the Illawarra Harbour and Land Company's railway—Illawarra Crossing—closed, in July 1902, and was removed. After that only a set of points from the main line, three exchange sidings at Dapto, and the segment of the private railway leading to the smelter were in use.

An artificial harbour—the Outer Harbour—was by then being constructed progressively, at Port Kembla. The southern breakwater was constructed first. By late 1902, it already extended to 1000 feet and its end was in 26 feet deep water.

==== Planned expansion ====
With more ore arriving and a lift in production during 1902, the directors envisaged a substantial expansion of operations, reporting that:

"the board is making every effort to meet the increase by enlarging the capacity of its works, which a year ago were only sufficient to treat about 150 tons of ore per day (say, 4,500 tons per month); but improvements and additions to smelting plant now approaching completion, will increase the capacity to 400 tons of ore per day, or, say, 12,000 tons per month, and according to the estimate of Mr. Blow this output should yield a profit of over £100,000 per annum. Apart from contracts now in hand, further supplies, extending to about 70,000 tons per annum, are now being negotiated, and will necessitate an enlargement of the present refining plant, which should take about six months to complete."

The problem would be how to fund such an expansion, given that even working capital was in short supply.

==== Trade union ====
In June 1902, a meeting was held and a trade union was established for workers at the smelter. The union was known as the Dapto Smelters' and Refiners' Union. It won an increase of 6d. per day for its members in September 1903.

=== Another change of control ===
In May 1903, there was another change of control. A circular had been issued which advised shareholders that:

"the directors have received from gentlemen, whose business connections enable them to control large ore supplies in Australasia, and greatly to extend the company's business, an offer to guarantee for a term of years the payment to the company (half yearly and in advance) of a sum equal to the, interest on the company's debentures, 7 per cent, per annum on its preference shares, and 20 per, cent. per annum on its ordinary shares for the time being issued; also to find all capital certified by the consulting engineer as immediately required for improvements and extensions of the company's works, in consideration of their taking four-fifths of the company's net profits, less four-fifths of any additional dividend to which the preference shareholders may be entitled under the articles of association"

Later, during 1905, the circular and its context would become the subject of a court case over alleged misrepresentation by two directors.

=== Nickel smelting plans ===
==== Contract with Consolidated Nickel ====
A company, known as Consolidated Nickel Mines Limited, was formed to acquire nickel mines in the French colony of New Caledonia. It was reported that the Smelting and Refining Company of Australia had accepted a 14-year contract to smelt nickel ore provided by Consolidated Nickel and sell the nickel on a "joint account".

In September 1903, work was well-advanced on setting up the plant to smelt nickel ore from New Caledonia, including the addition of a new 150 foot high chimney, talk of smelting nickel ore from New Caledonia. One report, in September 1903, claimed—almost certainly without factual foundation—that "The Rothchilds, of London, are now the controlling force behind the Company"

==== Enhancements to smelter ====
The nickel ore of New Caledonia contained more iron than nickel, and the key to smelting it was to obtain an iron-nickel matte, while removing most of the silica and some of the iron with the slag. To form the slag, a sulphur-compound flux would be added; it was planned to use gypsum (calcium sulphate) from South Australia, as that flux. The calcium sulphate would react with carbon (coke) in the furnace to form calcium sulphide, with the sulphide compound then reacting with the iron and nickel to form an iron-nickel matte, and the calcium with the silica to form calcium silicate slag. By controlling the amount of gypsum, some of the iron would also form part of the slag, as iron silicate.

In October 1903, the company's consultant A.A. Blow confirmed that construction was well advanced on a 250 ton/day nickel smelter.

==== Planned port arrangement with Southern Coal ====
A crane had been obtained, from Mort's Dock, to be installed on the Southern Coal Company wharf at Port Kembla, which was to be used to unload nickel ore for the smelting works at Dapto. However, the NSW Government had taken over that wharf, and the crane was not installed there. The exclusive right use of the wharf was won, in 1906, by the North Bulli Company, after a tender process. The ore shipments for Dapto would need to be unloaded in Sydney.

==== Nickel ore deliveries ====
By late 1903, Consolidated Nickel had 5,000 tons of nickel ore ready to ship from New Caledonia, and it was expecting to send 3,000 to 5,000 tons per month, once the Dapto Smelting Works was ready to treat it.

In December 1904, the first cargo of nickel ore arrived at Dapto. The ship, Saint Louis, loaded at Voh, in New Caledonia, and discharged the ore at Pyrmont, in Sydney, from where it was railed to the smelter. The consignment consisted of 1,700 or 1,800 tons of ore. A report in January 1905, said that operations to smelt the nickel ore would not commence until 10,000 tons had accumulated at the works. However, the new nickel plant was not complete, although £16,000 had already been expended on it.

=== Financial difficulties (1904–1905) ===
While the company pressed ahead with its new nickel ore smelter, its remaining business declined; incoming ore shipments had fallen to the extent that only one furnace was working. By March 1905, the huge sulphuric acid plant had been idle for "the past few years".

At the general meeting of shareholders in London, held on 18 January 1905, Smelting and Refining Company of Australia revealed the extent of its problems. A report of the meeting, in the Sydney Morning Herald, described the company's position as being "singularly unfortunate." It had made a loss, of £15,000 for the year to 30 June 1904. It owed Dalgety £22,000 and had other liabilities of £9,700, mainly a bank overdraft. After June 1904, most workers at the smelter had been working only half time.

The company would need to raise more money to pay its existing debts and complete the nickel plant. Directors proposed to raise £100,000, from shareholders, by an issue of debentures, and expressed confidence that the additional money would be sufficient for the plant to make satisfactory profits. However, it was already too late.

=== Closure of smelter at Dapto ===
The works closed, during March 1905, the reported immediate trigger was a lack of ore from Western Australia, but the company's perilous financial position was also highly significant. The new nickel smelter was still under construction when the works closed.

At the time, some thought the closure was temporary, but the Dapto Smelting Works would never reopen.

On 6 March 1905, it was reported that the contract to smelt concentrates from the Junction Mine at Broken Hill had been cancelled, and awarded instead to a German smelter. A number of small mines in New South Wales, which had been clients of the smelter, laid off miners because they become unprofitable due to its closing.

The closure of the smelter also affected Consolidated Nickel Mines. It had shipped nickel ore to Dapto—for smelting in the new nickel plant—but had no payment for it; the failed smelter company risked dragging down Consolidated Nickel with it. In early September 1906, forty rail wagons of nickel ore, which had originally come from New Caledonia, as part of a large consignment, left the Dapto Smelting Works. That ore was then on its way to be processed in Glasgow.

=== Impact on Dapto ===
The closing of the smelter in 1905 had an immediate impact on the township of Dapto, which had become something of a boom town while the smelter operated. Rents collapsed, by the end of March 1905; two houses, both previously rented for £1 per week, were offered unsuccessfully at 6d. per week. Many houses were demolished. By around 1918, Dapto had become what was described later as a 'sleepy hamlet'. Its fortunes only began to rise again later, with the opening of the Wongawilli Colliery.

=== Court case ===
The end of the Smelting and Refining Company of Australia, in 1905, led to a case before the Kings Bench Division, in London. Two shareholders sought to recover damages, from two directors, for alleged misrepresentation. The case revealed "a long and intricate story of cornpany dealings." It involved accusations that directors had acted in their own interests rather than those of shareholders, that "untrue, false, and fraudulent statements were made", and also "a conspiracy to defraud people, including the shareholders, by the statements made". The specific allegations related to a circular sent out by the defendants, on 2 May 1903, and a speech made by one defendant with the alleged concurrence of the other.

== Australian Smelting Company, later Corporation (1905 - 1909) ==
In August 1905, the shareholders, of Smelting and Refining Company of Australia, approved the sale of their assets to Consolidated Nickel Mines and resolved to enter voluntary liquidation. In late 1905, a new company, Australian Smelting Company, was formed to take an option over the assets of Smelting and Refining Company of Australia. In May 1906, some debenture holders sought an injunction to stop the sale, but were unsuccessful. However, for whatever reason, the previous plan to smelt Consolidated Nickel Mines's ore, from New Caledonia, was never achieved.

Zinc Corporation had been formed to process accumulated tailings, from the Broken Hill mines, which still contained significant amounts of lead, silver and especially zinc. During 1906, it seemed that there was a tentative agreement to smelt the resulting concentrates, at a new smelter at Port Kembla, to be operated by Australian Smelting Company. In January 1907, Zinc Corporation began to produce concentrates, at Broken Hill, reprocessing around 500 tons of tailings per day. It was envisaged, by that time, that the smelting of those concentrates would be done overseas.

In March 1907, Australian Smelting Company decided upon a capital reconstruction involving debentures. This resulted in the formation of yet another company, Australian Smelting Corporation—but many sources from the time still refer to that company by the old company's name, Australian Smelting Company. Debenture holders in the old company agreed to swap its debentures, with a face value of £80,000, for £65,250 worth of debentures in the new one. Interests with control of concentrates from Broken Hill were to subscribe to both the preference shares and debentures.

Directors of the new company included some figures of the emerging Collins House Group; W.L. Baillieu, William Clark, and their associate Herbert Hoover, of Bewick, Moreing and Co.. Other directors were drawn from boards of North Broken Hill and Broken Hill South. A number of the directors were also directors of Zinc Corporation.

=== Relocation to Port Kembla ===
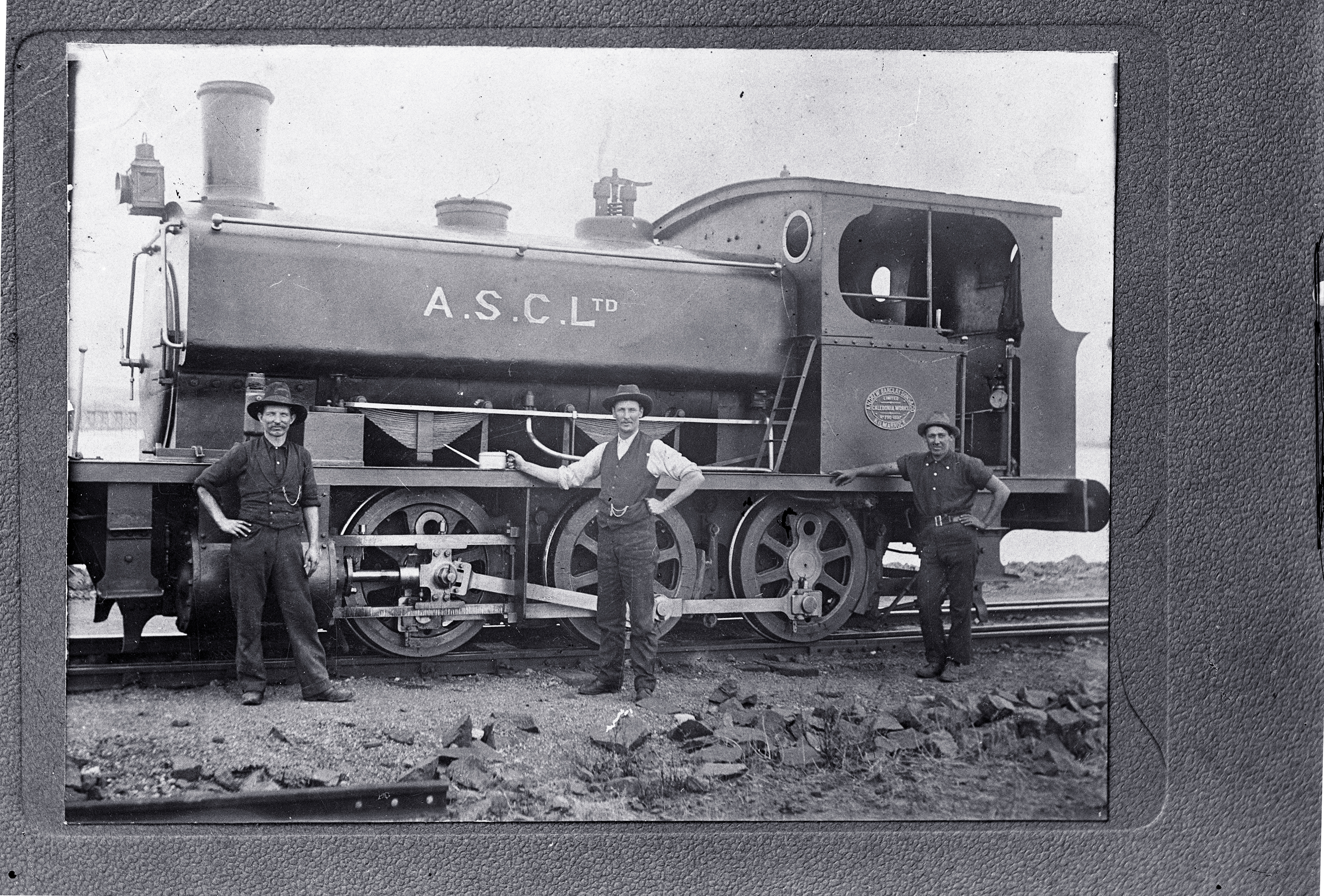
One of few images related to Australian Smelting Company; this locomotive was used between Dapto and Port Kembla.

The new company intended to relocate the idle operations to a seaport. During early 1906, they were considering either Newcastle, Port Kembla, or Port Pirie as the site for their smelter. By August 1906, they had settled upon Port Kembla, and had confirmed that the Dapto works were to be abandoned.

Australian Smelting Company bought 50 acres of Crown land, at Port Kembla, and in January 1907, commenced work, to transfer some plant from the idle Dapto site to there. The NSW Government tendered the work for construction of a new wharf at Port Kembla—the one known as the No.4 Low Level Wharf—to be used by the company and the adjacent Electrolytic Refining and Smelting Company of Australia Limited (ER&S). Substantial works were carried out at Port Kembla, including construction a railway embankment and railway to near the site of the future wharf, transfer of most of the buildings from Dapto to Port Kembla, partial completion of a chimney, foundations, and trestle work, and installation of two steam boilers.

It was expected that smelting operations would commence around the end of 1907.

=== Cessation of work at Port Kembla ===
Unexpectedly, on 4 October 1907, the company paid off its workforce and shut down all work at Port Kembla. It had insufficient working capital to purchase ore and to operate the new plant—perhaps even to complete construction—bringing about the crisis.

At the beginning of 1908, all remaining office staff, except two senior company officers, were paid off. The company's new office building and some houses that it owned, at Port Kembla, were then rented by Electrolytic Refining and Smelting (ER&S), and some office staff transferred to that company. On an adjacent site, ER&S's copper smelter and refinery commenced production in the same year.

=== Last attempt to save the venture ===
In January 1908, it was the still new Australian Smelting Corporation that resolved to enter voluntary liquidation and begin yet another capital reconstruction. However, that proposed capital reconstruction met with little enthusiasm from investors; it took longer than perhaps was anticipated and was not agreed, before at earliest November 1908. By then the plan for an operation at Port Kembla had been stopped by a lack of funds.

In early 1908, the North Broken Hill company was grappling with the question of smelting its ores, in Australia rather than in Europe. The dilemma arose because price competition between European smelters had declined, due to the rapidly expanding supply of galena concentrates from Broken Hill. The directors stated that buying the Port Kembla smelter was being considered.

With the capital reconstruction agreements in place, an option to buy the assets, with a six-months term, was granted to the Broken Hill South and North Broken Hill companies. However, in May 1909, they decided not to take up the option. Instead, those companies used existing smelters at Port Pirie. Subsequently, the two companies, with others from Broken Hill, formed Broken Hill Associated Smelters, which took over and expanded the smelters at Port Pirie. Eventually, the Port Pirie smelters would become, for many years, the largest lead smelters in the world, and cause very significant heavy metals contamination of the nearby environment.

The Australian Smelting Corporation (In Liquidation) was finally struck from the companies register, in February 1939.

== Abandoned sites and aftermath ==
Following the cessation of the relocation work at Port Kembla, there were two abandoned smelter sites—the partially-demolished one near Dapto and the partially-completed one at Port Kembla—but neither was suitable for operation.

The Port Kembla site was left in a state of abandonment for some years, protected only by a watchman, allowing equipment and structures there to deteriorate badly, due the salty air and exposure to the elements. By the end of October 1909, the company was in receivership—on behalf of its debenture holders—and the taking of an inventory of assets had commenced, with a view to selling those assets. However, no asset sale occurred, at that time. In March 1912, a shed at the Port Kembla site—containing valuable machinery removed from the old smelter at Dapto—was destroyed in a fire, resulting in a £3,000 loss. The fire was caused by three six year old boys 'playing with matches'.

In late October 1913, reportedly, forty tons of equipment arrived by ship from Melbourne, consigned to the Australian Smelting Corporation, and it appeared that perhaps work on the smelter site would soon recommence. However, it seems that recommencement never did occur, and the report of the equipment shipment may have been erroneous.

In early 1915, the trustees of the debenture holders of Australian Smelting Corporation were attempting to sell the Port Kembla plant. In 1916, the company was in liquidation, and its former site at Port Kembla was in other hands. From 1916, the Australian Smelting Company's site at Port Kembla, was occupied by Metal Manufactures, now known as MM Kembla.

During 1912, some of the accumulation of slag at the Dapto smelter site was removed and shipped by rail to Sydney, where it was reportedly used as aggregate in concrete. Some dismantling of old structures occurred during 1913. In early 1919, the Dapto smelter site and its remaining buildings were up for sale by tender. The remaining machinery there was sold in August 1919, and it was planned to remove it soon thereafter. The land subsequently became a dairy farm.

Two of the chimney stacks and the railway line to the smelter were demolished In 1921. The Illawarra Harbour and Land Corporation's private railway probably was lifted around 1938.

In 1952, Wollongong Council used some of the slag for roadworks on Avondale Road.

The office and laboratory buildings of the Dapto smelter remained standing for many years. The office building became a private residence on the dairy farm and the laboratory was used for storage. Both buildings were later incorporated into a larger building and became the 'Lake View' restaurant, which was still operating in 1988. The remains of these buildings were demolished in 1993. The slag dump remained exposed, until at least 2011.

== Remnants ==
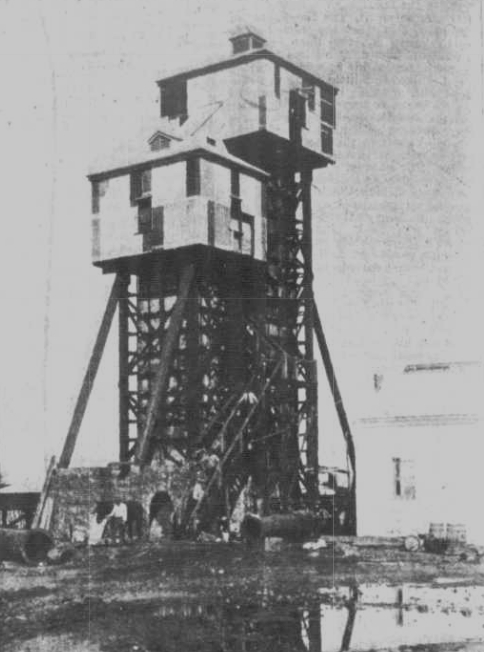
Acid towers in late 1897. The remnant structure now known as 'The Arches' is at the base of the tower structure, at bottom left.

Much of the site of the old Dapto smelter site at Kanahooka has been redeveloped for housing. The site needed remedial work to remove remnant heavy metals contamination. The work obliterated many vestigial traces of the old smelter, which had been evident in aerial photographs from as late as 1988. The north-western part of the site was redeveloped first, during the 1990s, as Forest Grove estate.

The eastern portion of the old site was the last to be redeveloped, and was known as Brooks Terrace; it was redeveloped beginning around 2011. Some foundations and in-ground structures survive and have been incorporated into open space within that housing area. There are in total 26 items described as 'heritage elements'. The naming of two streets, Wall Lane and The Arches, is after the remnants located there. The naming of Brooks Terrace, Nickel Lane and Saltwater Circuit reflects aspects of the former smelter. The former slag dump is covered by a mound and has been left as open space. The channel used for saltwater for cooling still runs to nearby Mullet Creek.

A curving, narrow strip of land, between Webb Park and a point nearby the intersection of Kanahooka Road and Brooks Terrace, is a part of the former route of the railway to the smelting works. Closer to Fowlers Road, where that road follows the former route of the Illawarra Harbour and Land Corporation's railway toward the site of their never-built port, the location of the Y-junction that led from that railway to the smelter is discernible in aerial views.

Aside from these remnants and photographs, there is nothing left of the short-lived Dapto Smelting Works.
