= Northbridge, New South Wales =

Northbridge
- Suburb
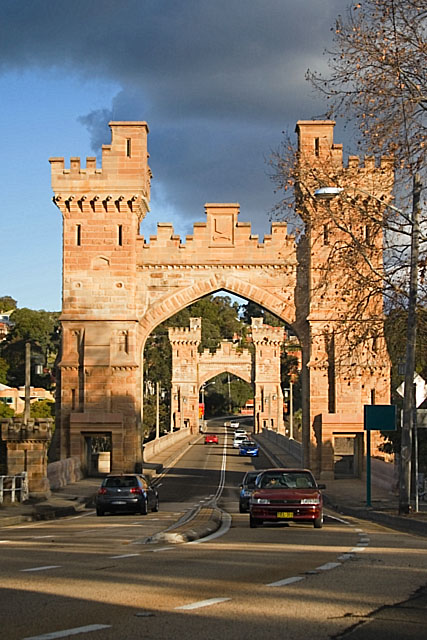
- Long Gully Bridge as viewed from Northbridge

- Interactive map of Northbridge
- Country: Australia
- State: New South Wales
- City: Sydney
- LGA: City of Willoughby
- Location: 6 km (3.7 mi) north of Sydney CBD

Government
  - State electorate: Willoughby
  - Federal division: Bradfield

Area
  - Total: 2.8 km^{2} (1.1 sq mi)
- Elevation: 91 m (299 ft)

Population
  - Total: 6,493 (2021 census)
  - Density: 2,320/km^{2} (6,010/sq mi)
- Postcode: 2063
Suburbs around Northbridge
Willoughby	Castlecrag	Seaforth
Naremburn	Northbridge	Mosman
Crows Nest	Cammeray	Cremorne

Northbridge is a suburb on the Lower North Shore of Sydney, New South Wales, Australia. It is located 6 kilometres (3.7 mi) north of the Sydney Central Business District, and 3 kilometres (1.9 mi) north of the North Sydney CBD in the local government area of the City of Willoughby. The major transport and shopping hub of Chatswood is 3 kilometres (1.9 mi) north west of Northbridge.

Northbridge is a quiet, leafy suburb with no through traffic as it occupies a peninsula that extends into Middle Harbour, and is surrounded by bush and water on three sides.

The Suspension Bridge, linking the suburb to Cammeray, has become a recognised symbol of Northbridge, completed in January 1892 and purchased by the state government in 1912.

The suburb celebrated its centenary in 2013.

== History ==
Northbridge took its name from its location, north of a sandstone suspension bridge built in 1892. The bridge was constructed by a team of land developers at a cost of £A 42,000, equivalent to A$6.82 million in 2022, and originally known as North Sydney Bridge. The engineer responsible for the construction was J. E. Coyle and the style was Federation Gothic, with medieval motifs as "unexpected embellishments". It has been known as the Northbridge and Cammeray Suspension Bridge but is now called the Long Gully Bridge.

The land where the suspension bridge was built belonged to William Twemlow, a Sydney jeweler. In 1868 he purchased the land extending from Fig Tree Point to the head of Long Bay, now Northbridge. He initially regarded the land as valueless but changed his mind when he made a handsome profit by selling some of it to an English syndicate who built the suspension bridge. Twemlow decided to build a two-storey home called The Hermitage, on Fig Tree Point, from sandstone quarried on the estate, which took a year to cut. As this was the first house built in this locality, transport was a problem and Twemlow had to sail through The Spit and around Middle Head to Circular Quay, from where he walked to his shop at Sydney Arcade.

Northbridge Post Office opened on 25 November 1920.

== Transport ==
At the 2011 census, 22% of employed people travelled to work on public transport and 52% by car (either as driver or as passenger). This is compared with the 2021 census (impacted by Covid) where 2% of employed people stated they travelled to work on public transport and 25% by car (either as a driver or as passenger). 60% of employed people worked at home.

== Demographics ==
Historical population
Year	Pop.	±%
2001	5,795	—
2006	6,031	+4.1%
2011	5,932	−1.6%
2016	6,347	+7.0%
2021	6,493	+2.3%

As of the 2021 census, the suburb of Northbridge recorded a population of 6,493. Of these:

- The median age was 44 years, compared to the national median of 38 years, children aged under 15 years made up 20.5% of the population (national average is 18.2%) and people aged 65 years and over made up 20.9% of the population (national average is 17.2%).
- More than two-thirds (67.4%) were born in Australia. The next most common countries of birth were England 4.8%, China mainland 3.9%, Hong Kong 2.1%, New Zealand 1.8 and Japan 1.6%.
- 76.5% of people only spoke English at home. Other most common languages spoken at home included Mandarin 4.5%, Cantonese 3.7%, Japanese 2.2%, Greek 1.4% and Armenian 0.9%.
- The most common responses for religion were No Religion 37.4%, Catholic 25.7% and Anglican 15.6%.
- Of occupied private dwellings in Northbridge 74.1% were separate houses, 19.2% were flats or apartments and 6.3% were semi-detached. The average household size was 2.9 people.
- Aboriginal and Torres Strait Islander people made up 0.3% of the population of Northbridge.

== Notable residents ==
Several notable Australians live in Northbridge including former NSW Premier Gladys Berejiklian, former federal 'teal' independent MP and businesswoman Kylea Tink, former rugby league champions Laurie Daley and Jason Taylor, former Wallabies player Phil Waugh, Seven News presenter and journalist Chris Reason and Australian journalist Kathryn Robinson.

The composer Dulcie Holland (1913–2000) and her conductor husband Alan Bellhouse (1914–1980) both lived in Kameruka Road in Northbridge until their deaths.

Eccentric bushman Michael 'Tarzan' Fomenko (c.1930–2018) grew up in the suburb in the 1940s after arriving with his family from Soviet Georgia via Japan.

The businessman and philanthropist, Edward Hallstrom (1886–1970), lived in a large house, 'Figtree House', since demolished, at what is now Hallstrom Close and Hallstrom Point Park, until his death.

Former Australian prime minister Bob Hawke (1929–2019) purchased a waterfront property in Northbridge shortly before the end of his tenure and resided there until his death in 2019.
