= Long Gully Bridge =

Bridge across Flat Rock Creek in Sydney, New South Wales, Australia

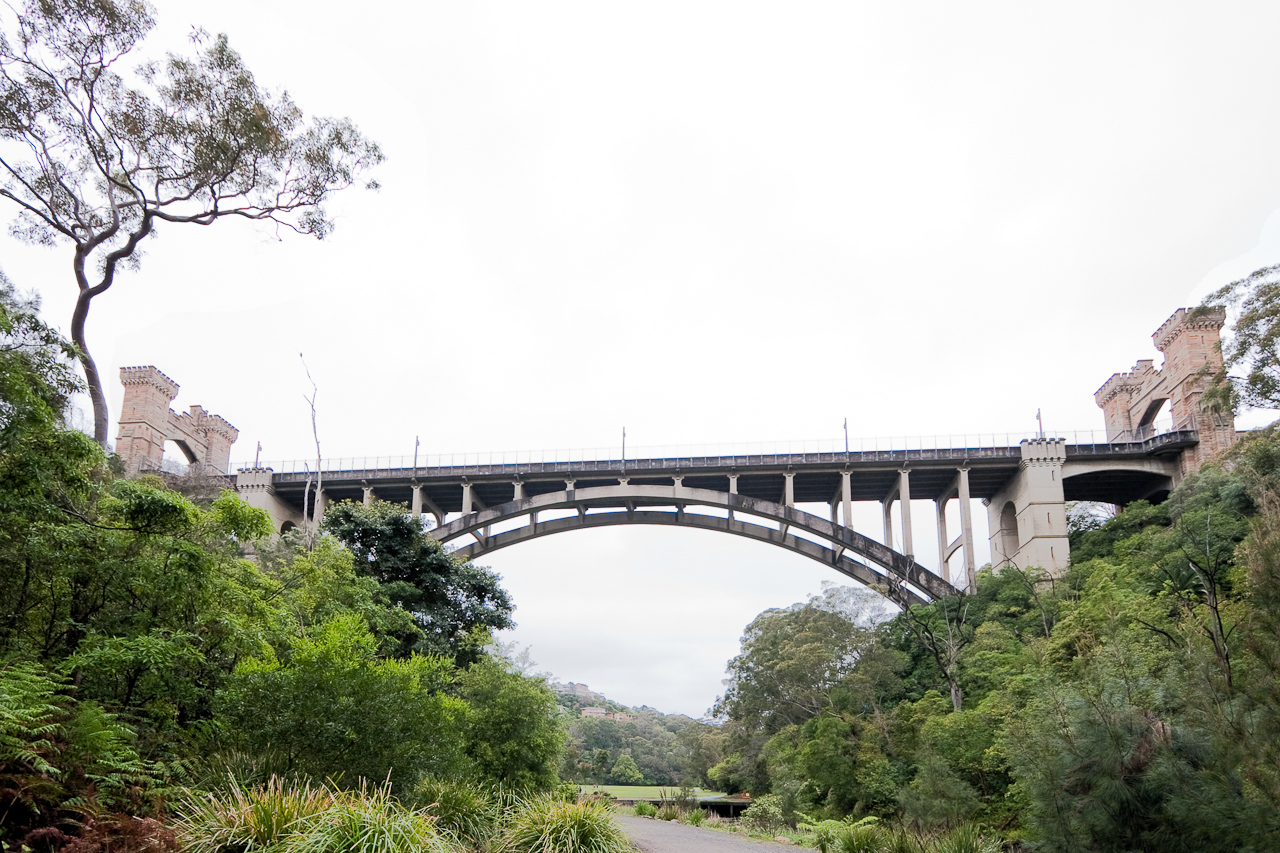
- Long Gully Bridge from Tunks Park
- Coordinates: 33°49′00″S 151°12′44″E
- Carries: Strathallen Avenue: Motor vehicles; Pedestrians
- Crosses: Flat Rock Creek
- Locale: Cammeray, Northbridge, New South Wales, Australia
- Other name(s): Northbridge; Suspension Bridge; Cammeray Bridge

Characteristics
- Design: Victorian Gothic arch bridge
- Material: Sydney sandstone
- Trough construction: Concrete
- Height: 51 metres (167 ft)
- Longest span: Original timber deck: 152 metres (500 ft); Current concrete deck: 105 metres (344 ft)
- No. of spans: 1

History
- Architect: D. Ross
- Constructed by: Hornibrook Bros, Clark Pty Ltd
- Opened: January 1892

New South Wales Heritage Database (Local Government Register)
- Type: Local heritage (built)
- Criteria: a., c., e., e., f.
- Designated: 30 May 2011
- Reference no.: I229
- Type: Transport – Land
- Category: Road bridge

Location
- Interactive map of Long Gully Bridge

The Long Gully Bridge, also known as Northbridge, Suspension Bridge, and Cammeray Bridge, is a concrete arch road bridge that carries Strathallen Avenue across Flat Rock Creek and Tunks Park, and connects the suburbs of Cammeray, in the North Sydney Council local government area to its south, with Northbridge in the City of Willoughby local government area to its north, on the Lower North Shore region of Sydney, New South Wales, Australia.

Privately-built to promote residential development in the suburb of Northbridge and beyond, the bridge opened in January 1892 as a steel suspension bridge finished in Sydney sandstone with crenellated turreted towers. The bridge was transferred to the Department of Main Roads in 1935 and, in 1939, was rebuilt as a reinforced concrete two rib arch bridge, with the sandstone towers kept.

== History ==
=== Original bridge ===
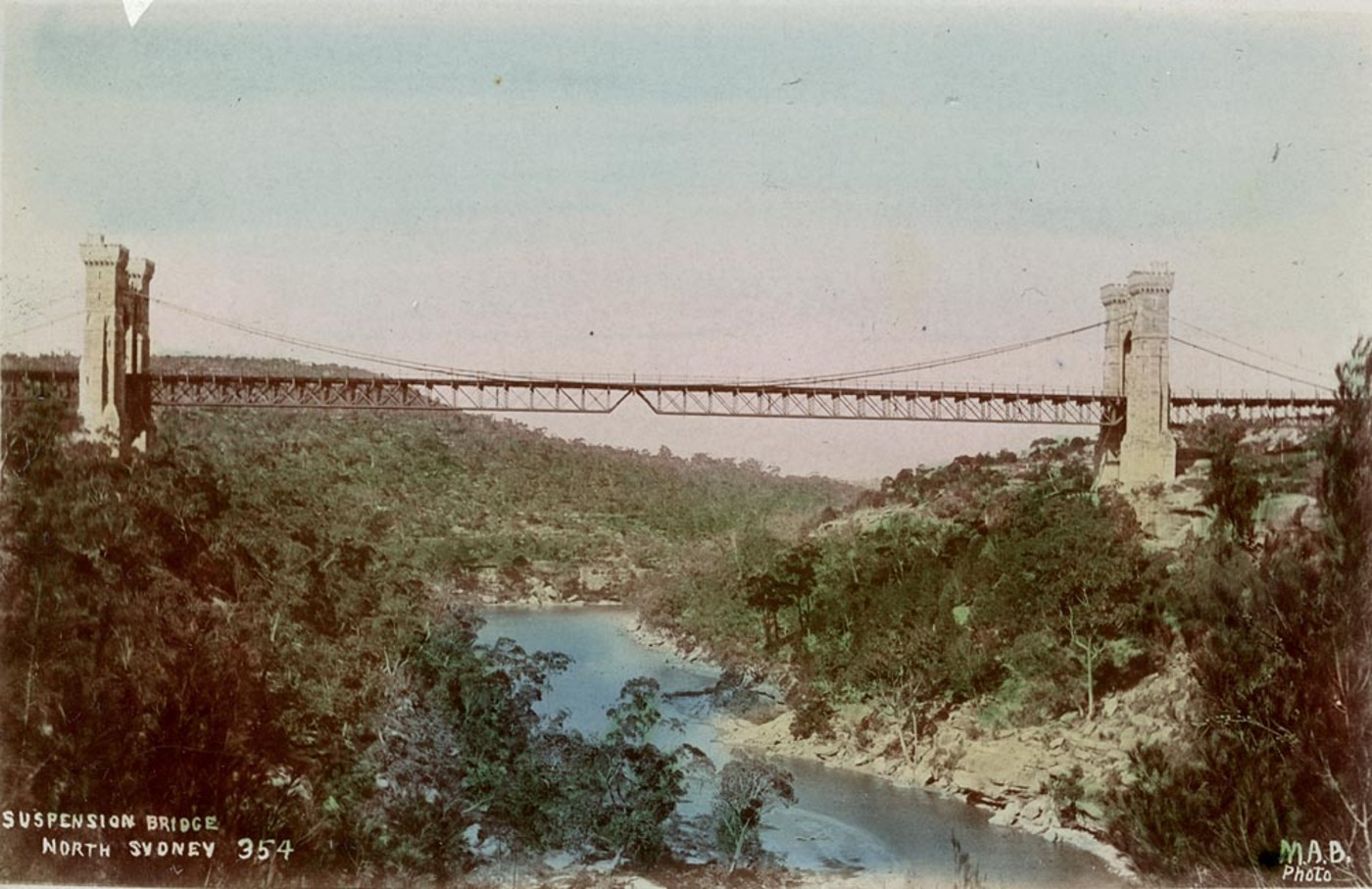
The suspension bridge, early 1900s

With the land boom of the 1880s, land to the north of Long Bay, Middle Harbour, was sold and resold. The North Sydney Investment and Tramway Company or the North Shore and Middle Harbour Land Company made major investments in the area and planned to build a tramway and a bridge across Long Bay gully in order to open up the area for sales of residential land. A suspension bridge across the gully was opened to traffic in January 1892. It had taken two years and nine months to complete and cost A£42,000. With a suspension span of 152 metres (500 ft) centre to centre of towers, it was considered one of the engineering wonders of Sydney and became a great tourist attraction.

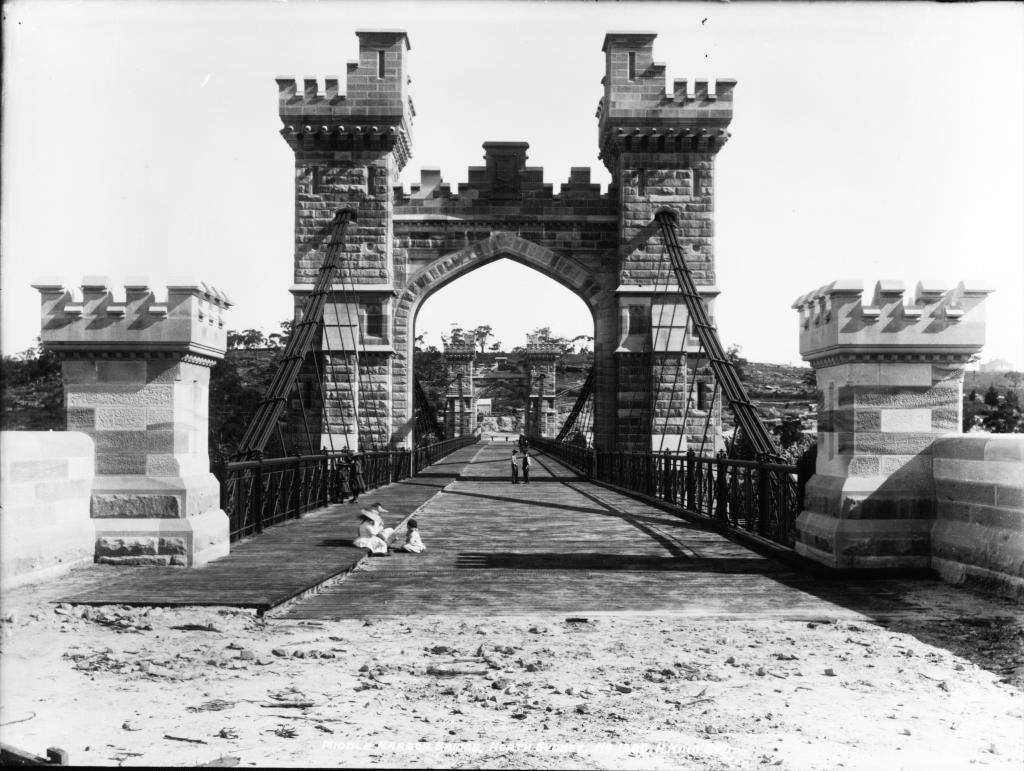
As a suspension bridge, 1890s

A toll of threepence return for adults and one penny for children was charged. The disastrous crash of 1892 saw both the above companies go into liquidation. The Depression of the 1890s slowed land sales and Northbridge did not develop as had been hoped; the tramway was not built. In 1894 a fundraising dance and promenade concert was held on the bridge. In 1912 the bridge was handed over to the NSW Government as a gift, on the condition that a tramway be extended to the north side and no toll charged. The tramway was extended over the bridge in 1913-14, with its terminus in Sailors Bay Road.

Between its construction and its handing over to the Department of Public Works, the bridge was little used and poorly maintained for many years. Repairs and some strengthening works were carried out in conjunction with the construction of the tramway. The Department of Main Roads (DMR) assumed control of the bridge in 1935 and inspections soon revealed serious corrosion in the steelwork and cables, partly attributable to defects in the design of the bridge. Water had been allowed to accumulate around the suspension rods as they passed through the cross girder ends in small, undrained reserves that had originally been filled with a bituminous mixture, which had not stood the test of time. The main suspension cables were also found to be weakened by corrosion.

The bridge was carefully monitored and it rapidly became clear that replacement or substantial rebuilding would be necessary. From several options, it was decided that a large concrete arch span to support the deck of the old suspension bridge was the most satisfactory solution. The towers themselves were in very good condition and were recognised by the DMR as having local significance as a landmark and tourist attraction and as having considerable historical value. For these reasons they were retained and repeated in the design of the new work, with much attention to sympathetic design. The bridge closed in May 1936.

=== Current bridge ===
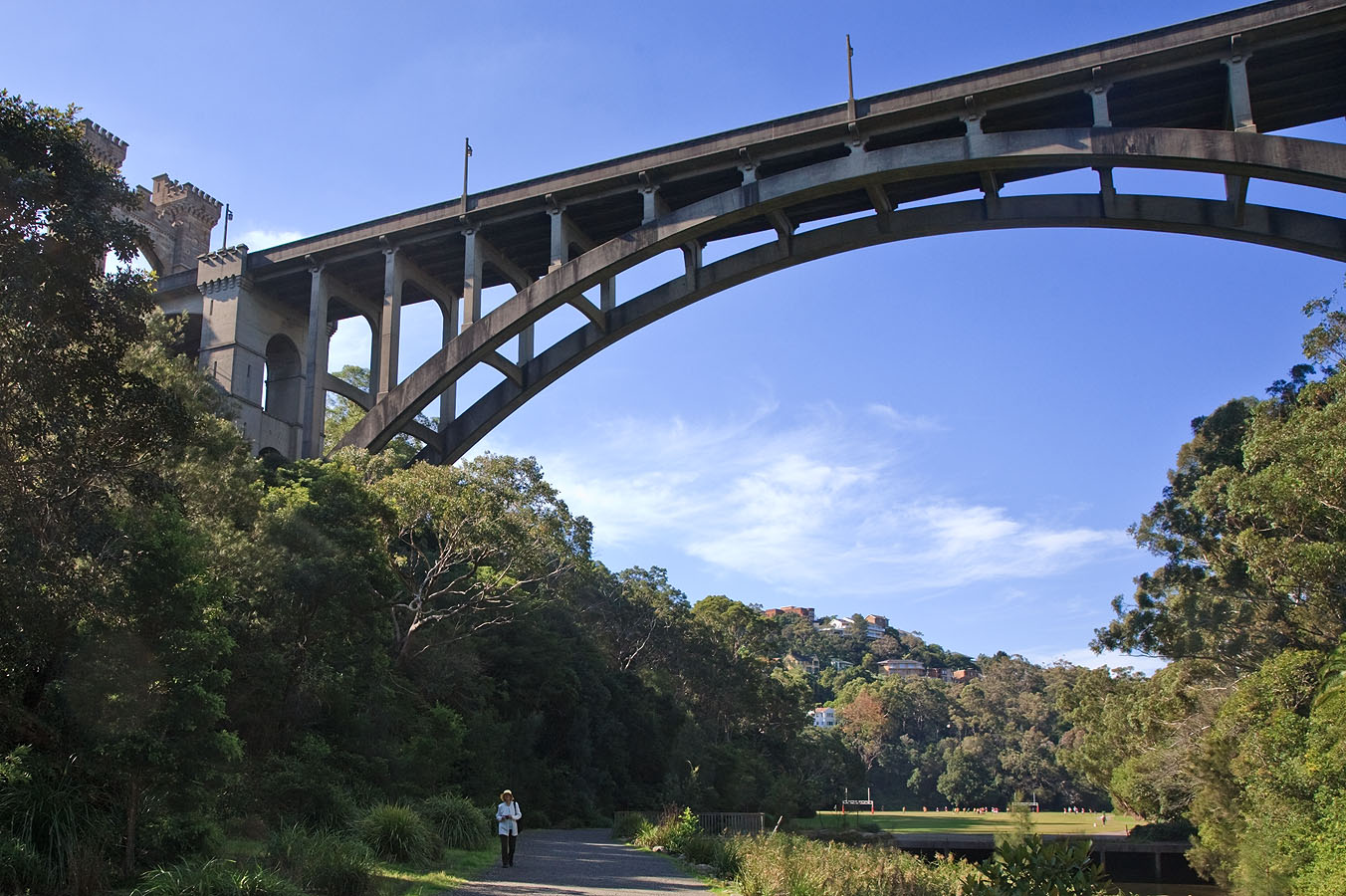
The arch of the bridge from Tunks Park

The arch was designed and tested through the analysis of models within the DMR. The construction contract was awarded to Hornibrook Bros. & Clark Pty. Ltd. The bridge was closed to tram and vehicular (but not pedestrian) traffic and work began at the beginning of June 1937.

While a 'Melan' system using a steel rib to serve as falsework and then reinforcement in the completed structure had been considered, the tenderers favoured the conventional system of timber falsework, and it was this system which was employed. An interesting innovation, however, was employed in the form of steel cylinders with base plate partly filled with a fine dune sand and fitted with a hardwood piston. The pistons bore the weight of the girders until it was time to strike the falsework when two small screw plugs on the cylinders could be opened to a carefully prepared schedule, with a large team of operators working to signals, and sand released so that the crown and then, gradually, the whole arch took up its own load.

Worker safety was also an important factor in the design of construction methods for the bridge.

The bridge was re-opened to traffic in late 1939.

== Description ==
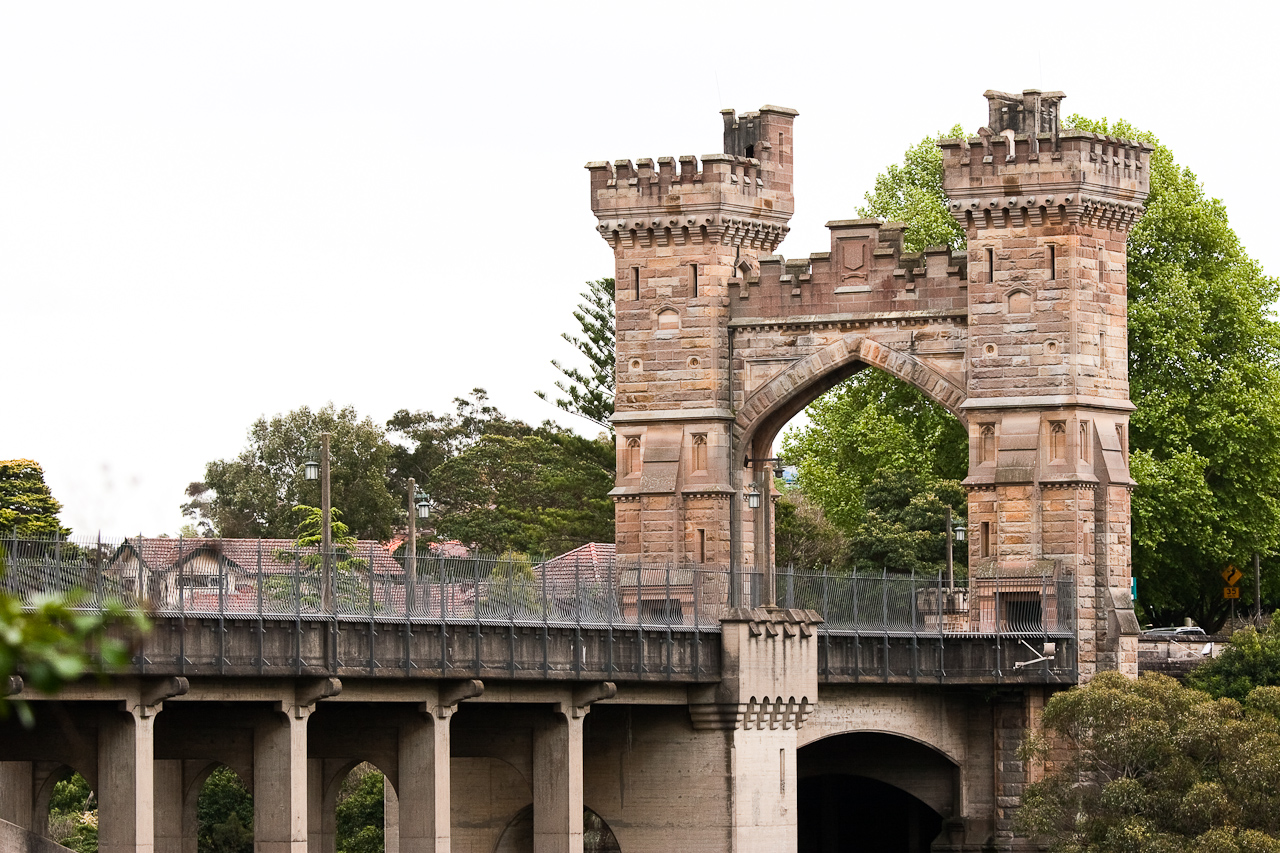
Northern turrets of the bridge

The original suspension bridge had a 152-metre (500 ft) main span supported by steel cables and steel hanger rods. The deck was stiffened by an undertruss which was pin connected at the centre of the span. The steel cables were supported on ornate sandstone turrets and anchored into bedrock at each end of the gorge. The wooden deck carried two lanes of traffic plus two tram tracks and footways.

Deterioration of the bridge due to corrosion led to the replacement of the suspension design by an arch in the 1930s. With a main span of 105 metres (344 ft), the arch consists of two concrete ribs, peaking some 51 metres (167 ft) above stream level. Supported on the arches are columns carrying the deck on 14 reinforced concrete beam slab spans. The deck has expansion joints at the large piers directly over the arch springs. These also transfer wind load from the arch and deck back to the foundations.

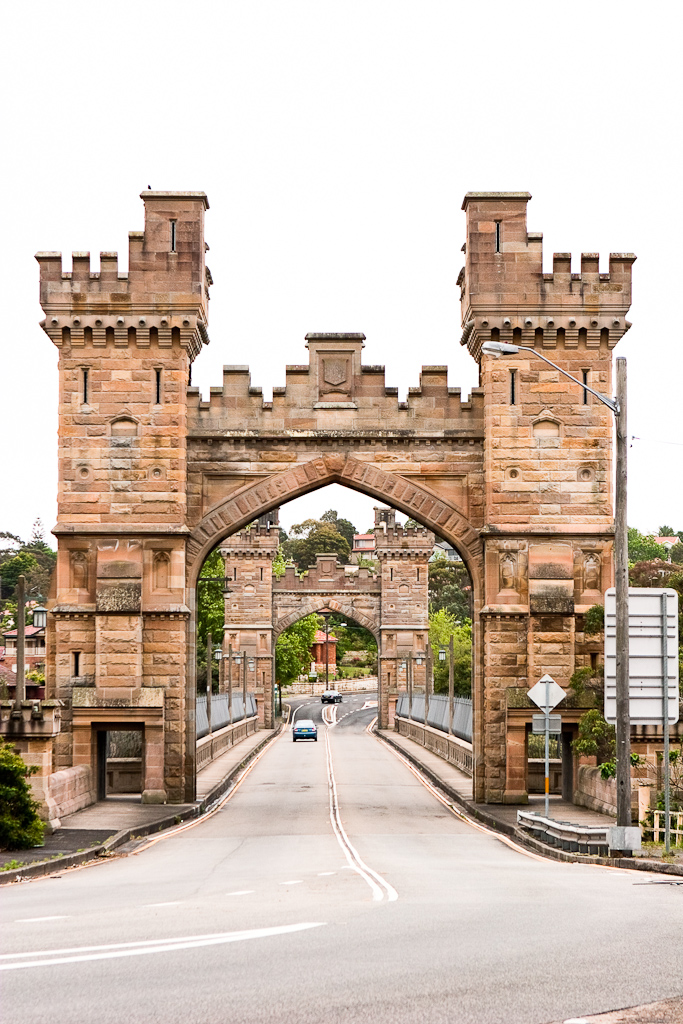
Roadway

Connecting these to the original turrets are 15-metre (50 ft) concrete beam spans. The concrete detailing was done in Victorian Gothic and Norman styles to reflect the Gothic sandstone towers, the main piers being given Norman castle features.

As part of the reconstruction the roadway openings through the towers were increased to nine metres (thirty feet), and walkway openings cut through the towers. The bridge has light standards supported by the concrete railings.

=== Modifications ===
- Suspension system (which was corroded) was replaced by a concrete arch in 1937-39
- Floodlighting was installed by Sydney electricity on 1992
- Safety fencing was installed on the bridge in 2010

== Heritage listing ==
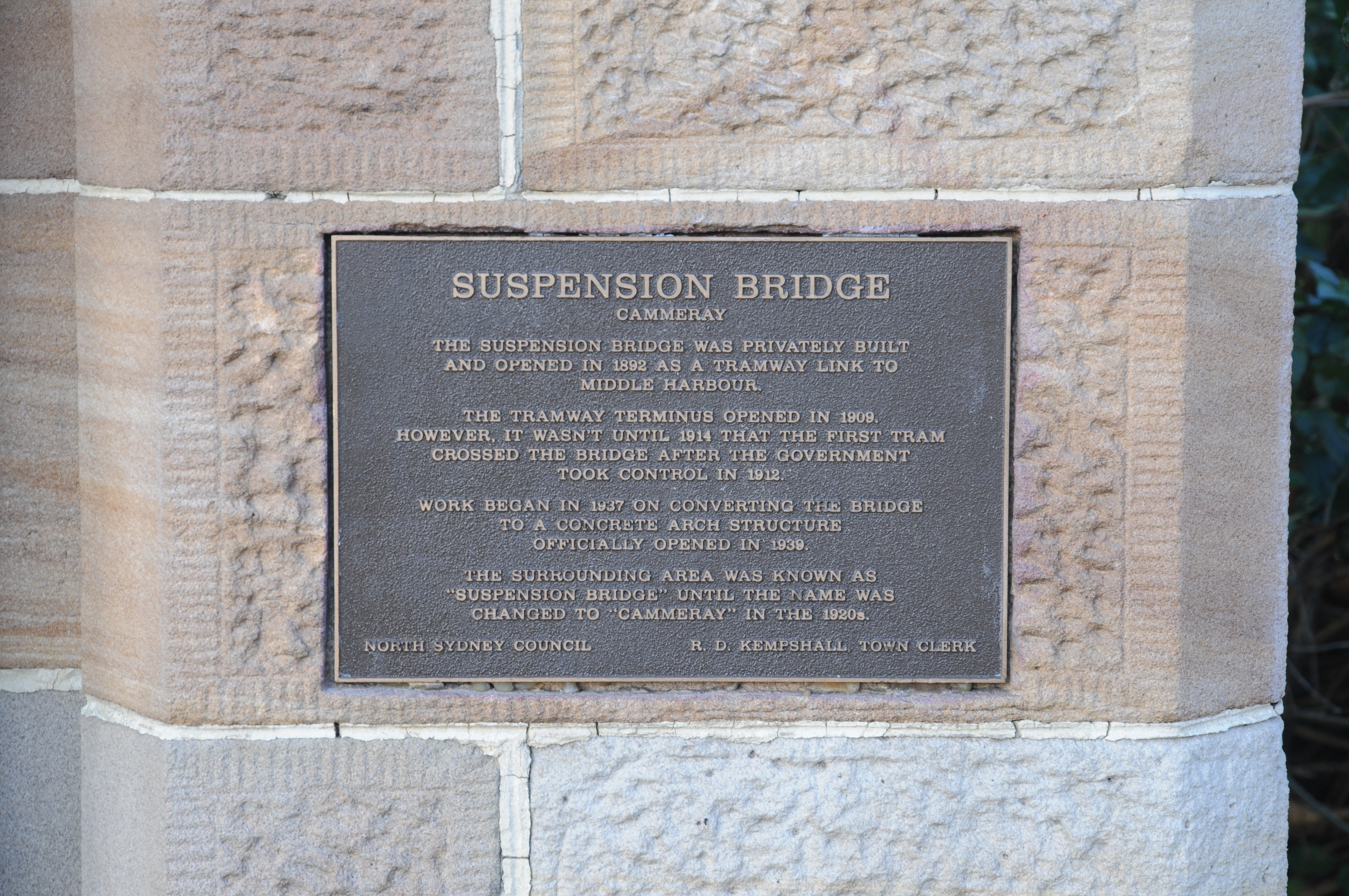
Plaque

The bridge is intimately associated with the residential development of the area to the north of the bridge, essential infrastructure which allowed its development to proceed in the late nineteenth century. The concrete arch which was built 1936-9 is a fascinating episode in the bridge's history. The process of the design and construction of the arch is illustrative of an era in the history of bridge building in the Department of Main Roads. It is linked with the local historical theme of engineering and building the road system. The use of the concrete arch solution to support the older bridge and to allow its landmark features to be retained was a creative and heritage-sensitive response to an infrastructure problem in an era long before heritage values and processes were enshrined in legislation.

== See also ==
- List of bridges in Sydney
- Australian non-residential architectural styles
