= Jones Creek (disambiguation) =

Jones Creek may refer to:

- Jones Creek (Big River), a stream in Missouri
- Jones Creek (Center Creek), a stream in Missouri
- Jones Creek (Mohawk River), a stream in New York
- Jones Creek (Pee Dee River tributary), a stream in Anson County, North Carolina
- Jones Creek (South Dakota), a stream in South Dakota
- Jones Creek, Texas, a village in Texas
  - Battle of Jones Creek, 1824 battle at the above location
- Jones Creek, New South Wales, the former name of the locality of Reno, New South Wales, Australia
- Jones Hole Creek, a tributary of the Green River
- the Song Canh Hom river in Quảng Trị province, Vietnam, nicknamed Jones Creek by United States forces during the Vietnam War

== See also ==
- Jones Branch (disambiguation)
