= Illawarra Harbour port scheme =

Formerly planned infrastructure in Australia

Coordinates: 34°30′57″S 150°49′04″E

Illawarra Harbour was the name of a port that was to have been constructed on Lake Illawarra in New South Wales, Australia. The port scheme commenced around 1888. The port was to have been developed by a company known as Illawarra Harbour and Land Corporation. A tender was accepted, in late 1892, and work commenced on a breakwater at the entrance of the lake at Windang, but that work ceased during the second half of 1893. In 1895, a railway was constructed on the western side of the lake. In 1898, a select committee hearing was told that the vast majority of shares in the company were in fact owned by an English-domiciled company, Illawarra Harbour and Railway Corporation. A planned dredged channel across Lake Illawarra and wharves on the company's land, at Elizabeth Point, near Tallawarra Point, were not constructed, no coal was ever shipped, and the mine and jetty scheme was abandoned in 1902.

The Illawarra Harbour and Land Corporation attempted to sell a sub-division of 288 allotments in 1897, without much success; land sales seem to have been closer to its real objective than was the establishment and operation of a port. The companies associated with the port scheme made some questionable related-party transactions involving directors of those companies. The only parts of the Illawarra Harbour port scheme that were ever used were some land, where the Dapto Smelting Works—a venture closely associated with the port scheme—was situated, after 1895, and the railway, after being connected to the smelter site and its sidings by another short railway line. The smelter closed, in 1905, due in part to the absence of a nearby port, which affected the feasibility of smelting low-grade ores.

== History ==
=== Origins ===
In July 1888, a group known as 'the Great Dapto Syndicate' bought some land, known as the Lakelands Estate, on the western shore of Lake Illawarra, with the stated intention of developing a port there. The Great Dapto Syndicate, included Thomas Andrew de Wolf and Andrew Armstrong, both of whom were later directors of Illawarra Harbour and Land Corporation. Another member of the syndicate was Benjamin Fink, who may have provided the financing.

=== Early years ===
John Sutherand introduced a private member's bill (Illawarra Harbour and Land Corporation Bill 1889) in the New South Wales Legislative Assembly in April 1889. The bill had a first reading, but, after being referred to a select committee, did not proceed further. A new bill was introduced by Michael Chapman, in April 1890. The Act also defined routes for railway and a southern branch line, and it gave the company access to land—mainly owned by others—for the railway corridors.

The bill gave the company a right to reclaim land over the lake bottom, using dredged material, and then to purchase that new land from the government at market rate, minus the cost of the work to reclaim the land. This right, seen by some as highly unusual, was one focus of debate over the bill.

The enabling legislation was passed in December 1890, and the Lakelands Estate was purchased by a new company, Illawarra Harbour and Land Corporation. Approval was obtained to quarry stone from Windang Island, to use in a breakwater, in late 1891. A tender was accepted, in late 1892, from a contractor, Brand and Drybrough—owners of the Cleveland Foundry and Slipway in Townsville—for £58,000, and some limited work was done on part of a breakwater—a 'tie bar' between the land on the southern side and the island—at the entrance of the lake at Windang, by July 1893.

=== Rival schemes and other ports ===
There was a rival port scheme, based on a plan to dredge Tom Thumb Lagoon, and make a new entry to it, via the existing Wollongong Harbour. In September 1889, an act of parliament was enacted, which established the Wollongong Harbour Trust and gave it control of the existing small port at Wollongong as well as the neighbouring Tom Thumb Lagoon. The new Trust was advised by Sir John Coode. He advised against dredging the lagoon. Instead, Coode proposed a scheme involving two breakwaters enclosing an area of water outside the existing port, reclaimed land, and multiple jetties within the safe anchorage. The Trust adopted that revised scheme, in March 1891. Some work commenced, but there were doubts about its feasibility, and the scheme failed to achieve adequate debt funding and was abandoned.

By 1890, as well as the existing port at Wollongong Harbour, there were ocean jetty coal ports at Austinmer, Bulli, Coalcliff, Bellambi, and Port Kembla. With the exception of the Coalcliff mine jetty and Wollongong Harbour, all these ports had a connection to the South Coast railway line, although all were owned by various mines and not necessarily prepared to load coal from other mines.

In late 1894, there was some agitation for construction of a breakwater to make safe harbour at Bellambi—a scheme known as 'Bellambi Harbour'— to protect its two coal jetties. One of those jetties was so badly damaged, during a gale in February 1898, that it was never used thereafter.

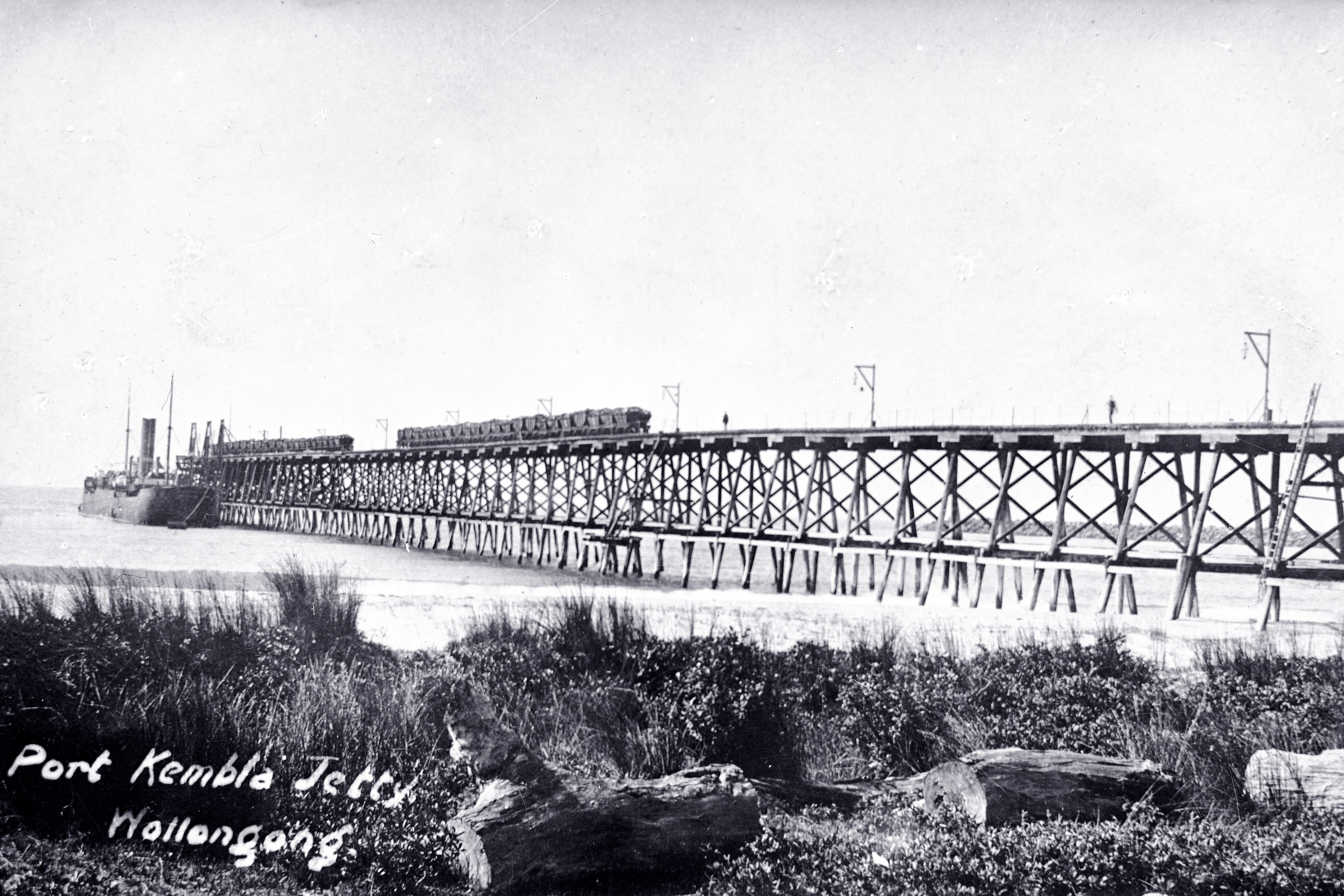
Mount Kembla jetty, Port Kembla (1883)

With the exception of Port Kembla, none of the ports were ideally situated to suit loading coal from mines at the southern end of the coalfield. At the time, Port Kembla—much like the other ocean jetty coal ports—was exposed to rough seas during bad weather. The large protected and safe anchorage, now known as the "Outer Harbour" did not then exist.

The only other coal port on a coastal lake was Lake Macquarie in the northern coalfields. It could only be used by relatively small ships, and dredging was needed to keep the Swansea Channel, at its entrance, deep enough for those small ships.

=== The planned port ===
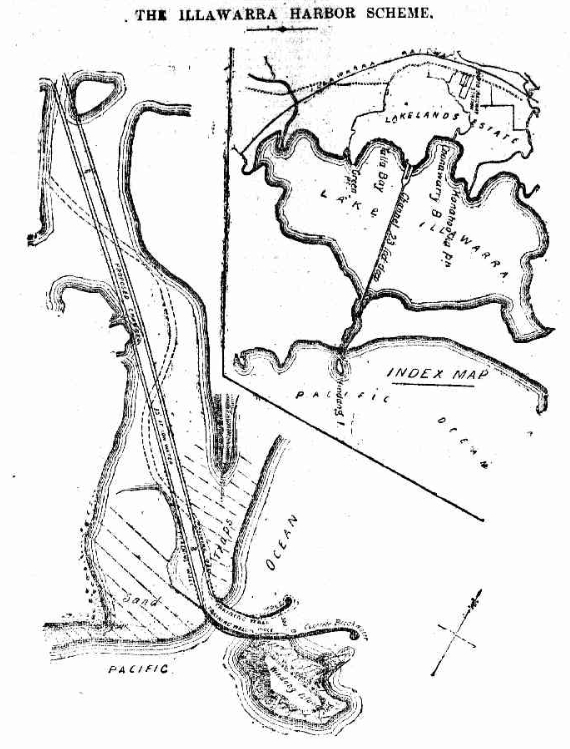
Map of the scheme (1889)

In a newspaper interview, in January 1893, Mr. L. R. Gundlach, C.E., an engineer, working for the company's consultant engineers, summarised the planned port works at Lake Illawarra, as follows:

"At the entrance to the Lake there will be two parallel breakwaters, the northern and the southern, each 27 chains in length, with a southern training bank of about 24 chains, and a northern one 13 chains long; also a tie-bank of about 20 chains, connecting Windang Island with the breakwaters. There will be an opening about 500 ft wide between the ends of the breakwaters. The outer ends of the breakwaters will be 12ft, and the shore ends 7 ft above high water-mark — their width on top will be 15 ft. They will be built of rubble blocks not less than 4 tons in weight, with 10-ton blocks on the outer portion. The length of the channel through the Lake will be approximately 3½ miles, and its bottom width will vary from 150 ft to 300 ft. There is intended to be a depth of 22 ft of water at low tide along the whole course of the channel. The proposed shipping basin at Tallawarra Point will have an average length of 30 chains, by 13 chains in width, and will give room for 4 double-sided jetties each 450 ft long, placed between 2 single-sided jetties each 1000 ft long. In connection with the harbour it is intended to construct about 8 miles of railway, of Government gauge, with all necessary sidings and other adjuncts for the transit and shipment of coal from the properties of the Corporation".

By July 1893, with the work under contract, the channel width had been reduced to 100 feet wide. The difficulties of the entrance works were apparent with the need to build breakwaters extending into the sea to a depth of 26 feet of water. The estimated cost of all the harbour works was £150,000.

The routes of a railway to the planned port and a southern branch line were defined, in the 1890 enabling act. Both were to originate on coal lands; the main line at the proposed site of the Ocean Steam Colliery—on coal land that was held by the Illawarra Harbour and Land Company—and the southern branch at a mining property owned by J.B. Watt. Their routes would have allowed subsequent connections to mine sidings of other mines in the part of the Illawarra escarpment to the west of Lake Illawarra.

=== Interruption ===
Work at the lake entrance ceased at some point during the second half of 1893. In February 1894, the two principals of the harbour works contractor, David Jollie Brand and David Leggatt Dryborough, petitioned to have Illawarra Harbour and Land Corporation wound up, presumably to recover money that they had not been paid for their work to date. In October 1894, "A portion of the plant recently used in connection with the Lake illawarra Harbourworks is being removed from Windang Island to Shellharbour:"

In 1893, Australia had entered a serious economic depression, which involved a banking crisis. By the beginning of 1895, it appeared that the port scheme had stalled. In a select committee hearing in 1898, Thomas Andrew de Wolf, stated that company's funding problems around this time related to, "One of the largest shareholders having a great interest in this company was the Mercantile Finance Company of Melbourne" and added that Melbourne company was, "Very badly insolvent". Mercantile Finance Company—nearly half its shares were owned by Benjamin Fink—had collapsed and a number of irregularities were found by its liquidator. Fink held a major interest in the Illawarra Harbour port venture, and was publicly associated with it, at least prior to his financial troubles.

=== Revival ===
Late in 1895, a select committee was told that, while the original purpose had been as a port for coal, there was now a plan to erect a smelter for sulphide ores. One envisaged advantage of the smelter to the port would be that ships would arrive ballasted with ore, for smelting, and depart carrying cargoes of coal.

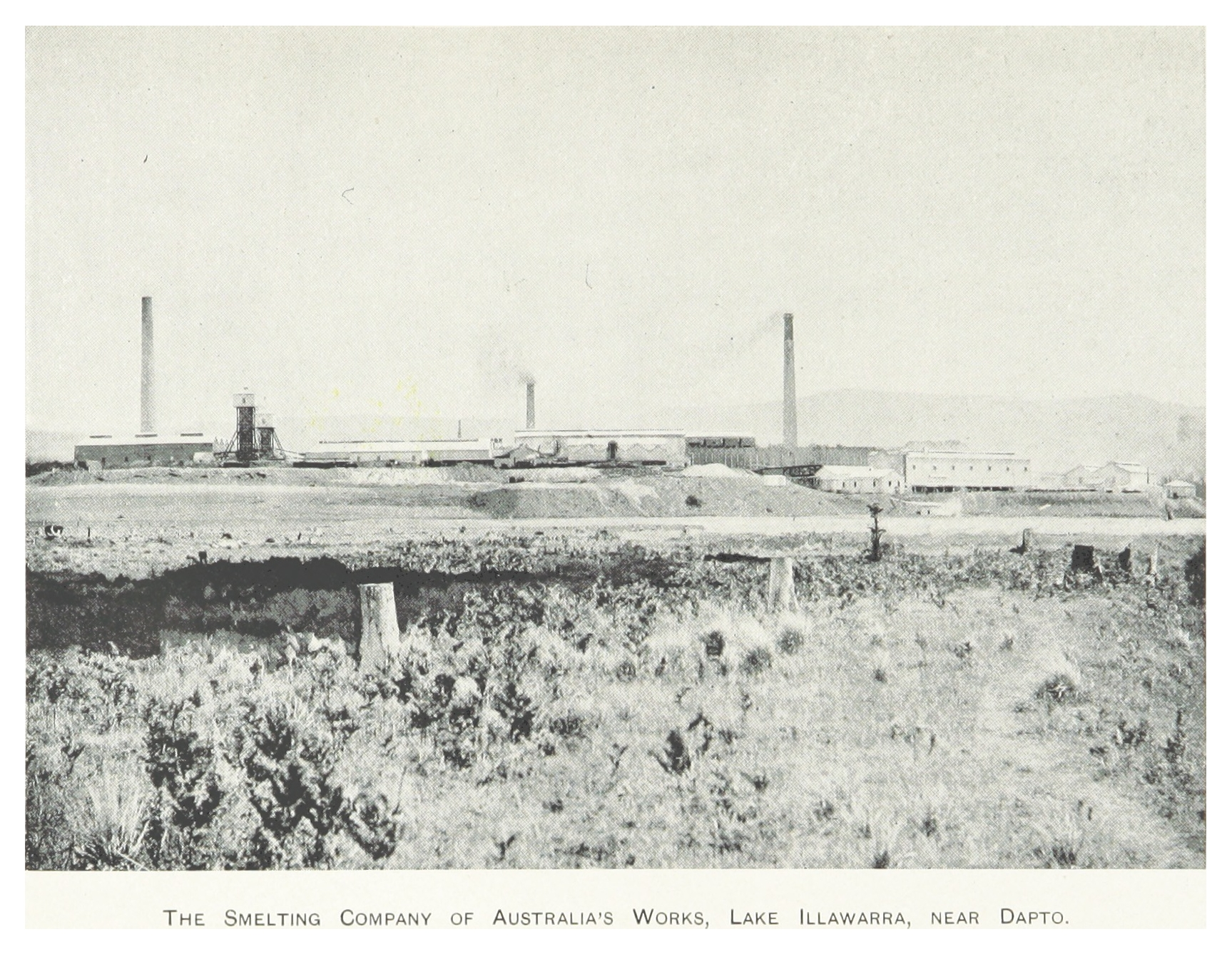
The smelting works (c.1899)

Further, it was stated that the interests associated with the new smelter would guarantee the debentures of the land company, allowing construction of a railway to the site of the future wharves. The outcome was that the port scheme received further impetus. The Illawarra Harbour and Land Corporation Act Amendment Act was passed, in December 1895, and it extended the time constraints on completion of parts of the port scheme. The chairman of the select committee examining the new legislation, John Cash Nield, was, by 1898, a director of Illawarra Harbour and Land Corporation. Neild was still in 1898 a member of the Legislative Assembly of New South Wales, and he continued to be one until around 1900, after which he became a senator for New South Wales in the newly established Australian Senate.

The Dapto Smelting Works was constructed, by the Smelting Company of Australia, among whose directors was Thomas Andrew de Wolf. The first managing director of that company was John Howell. The smelter commenced operation in December 1897.

=== Later construction ===
==== Railway lines ====
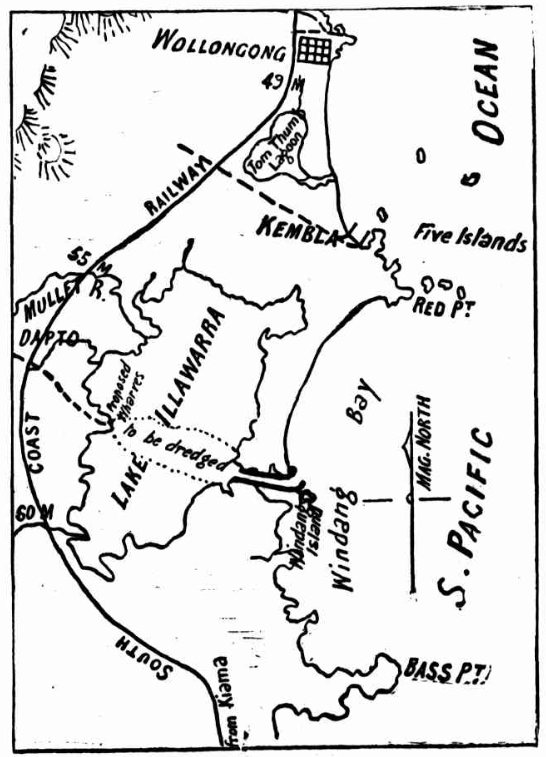
Map of planned port (1895), with private railways shown as dashed lines.

Under the original Act of 1890, the company had five years in which to complete a railway. It had been a condition of the Amendment Act of 1895, "That one of the railways mentioned in section thirty of the Principal Act shall be constructed and brought into use within the term of one year from the 20th December one thousand eight hundred and ninety-five". In other words, giving the company another year to complete a railway.

A standard gauge railway, 6½ miles long, was constructed from south-west of Mount Kembla, to near Elizabeth Point, just to the north of Tallawarra Point, where the company owned land and intended to develop the port and a township. It was essentially the railway that was defined in Schedule E of the 1890 enabling act, but the southern branch line, also included in that schedule, was never built.

The railway crossed, but was also connected to, the South Coast railway, a little south of Dapto railway station, around where Fowlers Road crosses the railway line now. It opened in December 1895. There was a signal box, known as Lake Illawarra Crossing, to control the crossing.

West of the crossing, the railway ran from the proposed site of the Ocean Steam Colliery. By 1895, the mining lease was held by Illawarra Harbour and Land Corporation. A right to mine coal there had been sold into the float of the Smelting Company of Australia. However, tests on the coal, made in 1896, revealed it to be inferior. Mining did not begin, rendering this part of the line essentially useless.

East of the crossing, the railway to the proposed port site followed much of the current route of Fowlers Road, toward the lake foreshore, before continuing via a cutting—now filled in—along what is now a strip of open space and then through the land lying between modern-day Kyeema Ave and Kimbarra Crescent. It then continued, in the direction toward where the port would have been, along what is now Gilba Road.

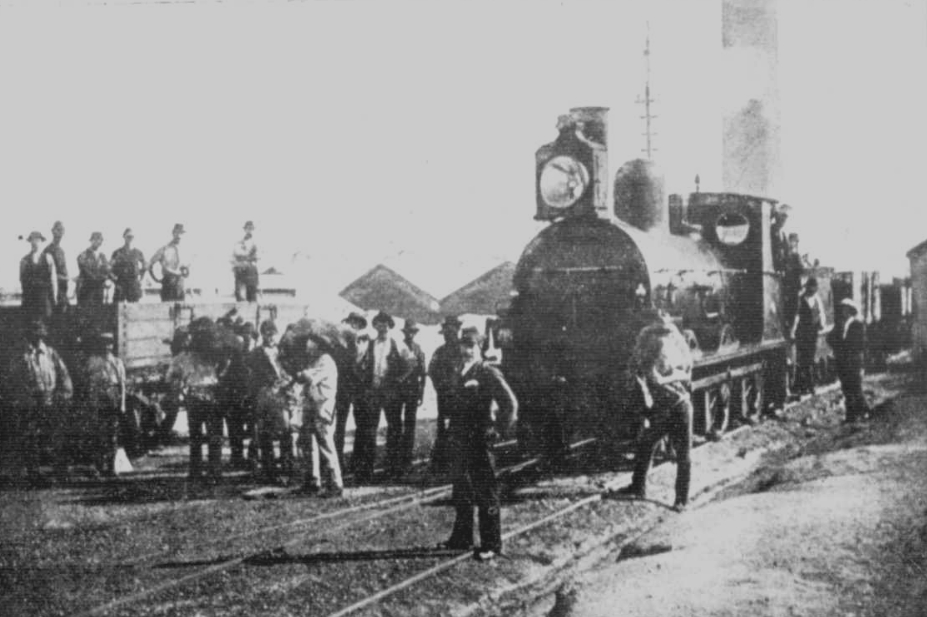
Arrival of an ore train at the smelter. A rare photograph of the railway in use, 1900

In an 1898 select committee hearing, the contractor who built the railway, Robert Amos, stated that the railway actually ended about a mile from the site of the wharves. That end location was sensible, given that the wharves or jetties and their land-side approaches—the means of bringing the railway up and onto those wharves or jetties—had yet to be constructed, and in fact never were constructed.

A short rail connection was constructed, linking the smelter site to the Illawarra Harbour and Land Company's railway. It branched from the railway to the proposed port, close to where Fowlers Road now crosses Brooks Creek. The line to the smelter then crossed Brooks Creek, curving to enter what is now Webb Park at its western end, then passing just to the south of what are now the southern boundaries of allotments adjoining the park. It then passed through what is now a curving, narrow strip of land, between Webb Park and a point nearby the intersection of Kanahooka Road and Brooks Terrace, after which it crossed Kanahooka Road and entered the plant.

==== Harbour works ====
The same contractor who built the railway, Robert Amos, also had a contract for the dredging of the channel across the lake bed and the entrance works at Windang. While financial arrangements had not been finalised, a sum of around £200,000 had appeared in the press. When Amos was interviewed on the subject, in September 1895, "He did not think the dredging would be difficult in any way. The making of the entrance, however, between the sea and the lake would not be easy work." Amos stated that he had contracted to do the dredging for a lump sum, and the other work on a schedule of rates.

In 1898, it was revealed in a select committee hearing that the contract for the harbour works was in status quo, pending a notice to proceed from the company. Amos also stated that those works had not proceeded, due a lack of funds from the company. He stated that, while a sand dredge had been arranged, it was at Coolangatta and needed transporting to the worksite. Nobody, it seems, was contracted by 1898 to build the wharves or jetties.

=== Expenditure and debt ===
The company secretary, Frank Jarvis, in the 1898 select committee's hearings, stated that around £3,503 15s. was showing in the company's books as having been expended on the works, up to September 1898, and only £800 of it since December 1895.

In 1898, it was revealed in a select committee hearing that the contractor who built the railway, Robert Amos (c.1832—1905), had received only £500 in payment, but held a mortgage, for around £34,000, over the Harbour and Land Corporation's railway and their land. Amos stated that the cost of the short line to the smelter—around £5,000—had been paid to him via Illawarra Harbour and Land Corporation, but that the sum had come from the smelter's owner, Smelting Company of Australia.

=== Ownership and control ===
There were 10,000 shares in Illawarra Harbour and Land Corporation, of which—or so it was stated at the 1898 select committee hearings—only 30 were owned by various Australian directors and investors; the remaining 9,970 shares were owned by the English-domiciled company, Harbour and Railway Corporation Limited. The shares had £100 face value, deemed to be paid to £50 and with one £10 call having been made, bringing the declared paid up capital of the Harbour and Land Corporation to £600,000. It was later alleged that the entire £600,000 had been applied to an inflated valuation of the land of the Lakelands Estate at the time that it was purchased by Illawarra Harbour and Land Corporation—why the shares were 'deemed to be paid', instead of paid up—in what is now called a related party transaction. If that allegation was correct, it would be consistent with the company being habitually short of funding for its harbour works.

Andrew Armstrong (c.1842—1921)—a Sydney-based lobbyist, land investor, and manager of land development ventures, such as the one associated with the suspension bridge at Northbridge—Lieut-Col. John Cash Neild (1846–1911)—a colourful NSW politician and later Senator—and Mr. A. B. Chippindall (c.1853—1903)—local manager for Harbour and Land Corporation and Lakelands Estate—were local directors of Harbour and Land Corporation, in 1898. Each had one share in the company. Edmund Barton (1849–1920)—NSW politician and later first Prime Minister of Australia and judge of the High Court—had been a director, but was no longer one, by late 1898, although he still owned one share. Thomas Andrew de Wolf had been a director, up to around 1893. Andrew Armstrong was managing director, with a Power of Attorney for the English investors, and two of his relatives, J.H. Armstrong and J. Armstrong also held one share. However, control of the company was held by the English company, Harbour and Railway Corporation Limited, an arrangement that shielded those with beneficial control from scrutiny in New South Wales.

Originally there were more than 30 shares held in Australia; a man by the name of C. Dyring owned 60, in 1891, and the chairman of the Daily Telegraph and director of Port Jackson and Manly Steamship Co., J. R. Carey (1834–1923), had 30. Robert Matteson Vaughn and a Mr Styles had received shares, as a part of the transactions when the company acquired coal lands that they held, the site of the proposed Ocean Steam Colliery.

If the evidence given at the 1898 Legislative Council select committee is correct, and there were indeed only 30 shares held in Australia, various shareholders had either sold or forfeited their shares by 1898. Some shareholders had forfeited their shares for not paying the £10 call; inexplicably, other shareholders had not paid the call but still retained their shares. Others like R. J. Carey paid the call, anxious to sell out and extricate themselves from any further association with the company, as quickly as they could. Until at least late 1889, Carey had been a director of the company. He was able to provide a detailed history of the company and the decisions of its board, to the Legislative Assembly's select committee, in 1898. The 1898 select committee hearings revealed very serious shortcomings in the corporate governance of Illawarra Harbour and Land Corporation.

The beneficial ownership of Illawarra Harbour and Land Corporation was somewhat hidden behind the majority shareholding held by the English-domiciled company, Illawarra Harbour and Railway Corporation. During the 1898 select committee hearings, Andrew Armstrong revealed some of the larger shareholdings in that English company. Three then current directors of Illawarra Harbour and Land Corporation had substantial interests in the English company; Andrew Armstrong had £100,000 worth in trust for his wife and family; John Cash Nield—then still a sitting member of the NSW Legislative Assembly—had £1,000 worth; A.B Chippendall had £500 worth. Thomas Andrew de Wolf—a former director of Illawarra Harbour and Land Corporation and, in 1898, a director of both the English company and Smelting Company of Australia—had interests of "£140,000 to £150,000 worth".

=== Land dealings ('Lakeland Estate') ===
Thomas Andrew de Wolf (—1903) was a former managing director of Illawarra Harbour and Land Corporation, but by 1898, managing director and a major shareholder of the English-domiciled company, Illawarra Harbour and railway Corporation, and a director of the Smelting Company of Australia. At select committees held, in 1898, he was asked about the company's commitment to building the port. He replied to the effect that the main object of the company was to sell its land profitably. The company would build the port only, because the government or some other entity would not do so, to realise the consequent increase in the value of the land. De Wolf claimed that the company had bought its land for £90,000.

To the same select committee—this time speaking as a director of Smelting Company of Australia—de Wolf, stated, "If it had not been for the intention to construct that harbor, the present site would not have been chosen for the smelting works." Yet, until 1894, de Wolf had been a director of Illawarra Harbour and Land Corporation—the company which had failed to construct the port—and was, by 1898, managing director of the English company which owned it.

One of the few to openly question the probity of the various land transactions, inflated valuations of the landholdings, and apparent conflicts of interest was Richard Sleath (1863–1922). Allegations were made by Sleath and two colleagues, Ferguson and Carroll. The three sat on the Legislative Assembly's select committee of December 1898.

Sleath stated—under parliamentary privilege, in December 1898—that the original purchase, of the Lakelands Estate, in July 1888, was for £35,000, of which £30,000 was covered by a vendor-provided mortgage loan. He also stated that there had been two subsequent sales; one in September 1888 for £240,000, and a second sale into the float of Illawarra Harbour and Land Corporation, on 1 October 1888, for £600,000. It was with this last and highest-priced transaction, that the last official owners of the land were issued with sufficient shares in the new company, Illawarra Harbour and Land Corporation, to take a controlling interest; thus they had legally sold the land but retained effective ownership of it through a company structure, but at a higher apparent market value.

Sleath also alleged that, in July 1892, the title of the Lakelands Estate had been transferred to Benjamin Fink, at a price of 10 shillings. Fink then mortgaged it to a company, which he owned and controlled, Wallach Brothers, for £8,320. This was around the time that Fink's massive financial problems were beginning to become apparent.

In July 1894, the land had been close to being back in the hands of its former owner, Patrick Hill Osborne (1832 – 1902), who intended to subdivide it. Evidence was given at the select committee in 1898, that a sum had been owed to Osborne, causing him to begin repossessing the land, as mortgagee. Earlier in 1894, some creditors of the company—the two principals of the harbour works contractor Brand and Drybrough—had petitioned to have it wound up, so apparently the supposedly well-capitalised company was not paying all its debts. De Wolf relocated to London in the same year.

Illawarra Harbour and Land Corporation had sold 500 acres at the northern end of the 'Lakeland Estate' to a group of entrepreneurs, known as the Camden Syndicate Limited, another English-domiciled entity, before the end of July 1895. The Camden Syndicate then sold 300 acres of the land, three small mines, and some rights to the Smelting Company of Australia, for £50,000 in cash and 250,000 fully-paid £1 shares. That transaction secured the Camden Syndicate a controlling interest in the new smelting company, before the remaining 250,000 shares were offered to the public in London. Much of the cash component of the land sale was used to pay off the original mortgage debt to Osborne, according to the evidence given to the 1898 select committee, by the Illawarra Harbour and Land Corporation's company secretary, Frank Jarvis. The party who was originally in debt to Osborne was, logically, one or more of the 'Great Dapto Syndicate' who had bought the land from Osborne, in July 1888—essentially, de Wolf, Armstrong, and Fink— although the debt liability may have been assumed by one of their various corporate structures.

The common major shareholders of the three companies and the generous revaluations of the Lakeland Estate strongly suggest that the two transactions leading to the formation of the smelter company, were yet again what is now known as related party transactions. A newspaper correspondent—one who supported the harbour scheme—wrote, in March 1897, "although it is not generally known that the Camden syndicate, which formed the Smelting Company of Australia, is a creation of the Illawarra Harbour and Land Corporation, such is the case".

The members of the Camden Syndicate included Andrew Armstrong (c.1842—1921), Benjamin Josman Fink (1847–1909)—a financier and land speculator, from Melbourne— John Howell (1833–1910)—an experienced and well-known mine manager and smelting expert, with financial interests in various mines—and Thomas Andrew de Wolf (d. 1903). All four were residing in Australia in 1890, but two subsequently relocated to London; Fink following the spectacular collapse of his finances in 1892, and de Wolf from around 1894. Fink had been a director of Mercantile Finance Company. As his Melbourne-based property empire collapsed, Fink was able to transfer various sizable assets to his wife Catherine. His reputation was damaged as a consequence, since others bore the cost of his financial problems.

Around the time that the new smelter was nearing completion, an attempt was made to sell 288 sub-divided allotments by "The Illawarra Harbour and Land Corporation, Limited, Sydney, and The Illawarra Harbour and Railway Company, Limited, London". The subdivision was first advertised in December 1896. It was stated to be the 'first subdivision' and the site of "the nucleus of a model city". Advertisements emphasized the proximity to the smelting works and the buoyant prospects for the smelter and coal mines, but made no mention of the port or harbour, except for the word "Harbour" in the two companies' names. The land was adjacent to the smelting works on the southern side of Kanahooka Road; it was styled as "Illawarra City".

A report of the auction held on 15 March 1897, to sell the lots was that, "The attendance was good, but bidding was anything but spirited". Only twenty-four lots were reported as being sold. It seems to have been the last land sale by the company, but it was not yet the end of the port scheme.

=== Final years of the port scheme ===
John Howell became the first general manager of the smelter, as well as managing director of Smelting Company of Australia. As late as February 1898, he was still stating—at least publicly—a confident expectation that the deepening of the lake bed for the new harbour would be completed within twelve months. Howell resigned, in May 1898, to pursue his private mining interests.

The Camden Syndicate—having achieved its aim to establish the smelting company and fold the assets it owned into it—resolved on 12 May 1896 to enter voluntary liquidation and wind up its affairs. The Syndicate then immediately reformed as a new entity, Camden Exploration Company, with John Howell as its mining adviser. The relationship between Howell and the new company apparently soured, and in 1899 Howell sued the company for damages for his alleged wrongful arrest under a writ of capias. Camden Exploration appears to have been a financial vehicle for the promotion of gold mining companies, one such—ultimately unsuccessful—mining venture was Mount Kimo Gold Mining, with its mine near Gundagai.

Under the Act passed in 1895, the company had been required to deposit £10,000 with NSW Treasury, by 20 December 1897, as security for completion of the harbour works. The deposit was paid to Treasury around that time. It later emerged that the money had come from the Smelting Company of Australia. That company had acquired 1,000 ordinary shares and 1,000 preference shares of Illawarra Harbour and Land Corporation Limited, in exchange for a £10,000 cash payment and certain guarantees that it provided to the Camden Syndicate, in what was yet another related party transaction.

Select committee hearings were held concerning the Illawarra Harbour and Land Corporation Act Further Amendment Act, in late 1898. There were two separate select committees; one of the Legislative Council, in September–October 1898, and the other of the Legislative Assembly, in December 1898. The select committees struggled to understand the various land transactions, the complex ownership arrangements, the relationship between various interested parties, the apparent lack of progress on the harbour work, and the seeming lack of funds, despite the company involved supposedly being well-capitalised.

Another committee—the NSW Parliamentary Standing Committee on Public Works—looking into a deepwater port for the Illawarra region concluded, also in late 1898, that it would take five to seven years to complete the Illawarra Harbour port; it did not recommend delaying the decision on an alternative artificial harbour at the existing coal port of Port Kembla. The outcome was that the NSW Parliament hedged its bets, passing separate acts that both enabled the Port Kembla harbour works and granted a further time of two years, to complete the Illawarra Harbour scheme. One factor that kept hope for the Illawarra Harbour scheme alive was that, being a private venture, it would be built without cost to the NSW Government, who otherwise would be funding any work at Port Kembla.

In January 1900, two mining leases—including the 'Ocean Steam Colliery'—held by the Illawarra Harbour and Land Corporation were cancelled, due to non-payment of rent.

In April 1900, the Governor of NSW issued a proclamation. It made the depth of dredging 20 feet, below low water, instead of 15 feet, and it granted a further extension of time to complete the harbour works, to a date four years after 3 April 1900. The date by which the company had to complete the port works or forfeit the £10,000 security deposit was 3 April 1904.

John Howell's successor as General Manager of the Smelting Company of Australia, Ernest Ludwig Adolph Weinberg (1855–1925), resigned in April 1901, to become general manager and chief metallurgist of Chillagoe Railway and Mining Company. From around mid-1900, the smelter assets had been under control of Smelter and Harbour Syndicate Limited, which sold them to a newly floated London company, Smelting and Refining Company of Australia, in exchange for 150,000 6% preference shares in that company. The new company's board did not include any of the Camden Syndicate members; one director was its 'local advisor', Sir Edward Horne Wittenoom (1854 – 1936) . The new company agreed to take over the liabilities of Smelting Company of Australia and the smelter assets on 29 January 1902. The shareholders of Smelting and Refining Company of Australia only finally ratified the purchase, in April 1902.

The new management assumed control of the smelter during May 1902. An immediate priority of the new company was obtaining agreement to lower rail freight rates and wharfage fees for New South Wales ores landed in Sydney. Once these reduced rates were achieved, there was an increase in the amount of ore arriving at the smelter by rail. The old company, Smelting Company of Australia subsequently resolved to enter voluntary liquidation, in July 1902.

The dredged channel across Lake Illawarra and the wharves at Elizabeth Point were not constructed, no coal was ever shipped, and the mine and jetty scheme effectively was abandoned in 1902. There seems to no official announcement of that outcome, but in early 1903, one report described the port scheme as being, "hopelessly dormant, if not dead".

== Aftermath ==
An artificial harbour—the Outer Harbour—was constructed progressively, by extending breakwaters at Port Kembla, between 1901 and 1937. The southern breakwater was constructed first; it already extended to 1000 feet and its end was in 26 feet deep water, by late 1902.

The only parts of the Illawarra Harbour port scheme that were ever used were the land where the Dapto Smelting Works was situated, and the part of the railway that provided a connection to the smelter and its sidings. The crossing of the South Coast line—Illawarra Crossing—closed in July 1902, and was removed, leaving only a set of points, three exchange sidings, and the segment of the private railway toward the smelter in use. The crossing had never carried a train, other than the contractor's trains used in construction of the line.

The smelter, which by then was owned by Smelting and Refining Company of Australia, closed in March 1905. The Illawarra Harbour and Land Corporation's railway was then no longer used at all, except by Australian Smelting Company, during 1907, for relocating various parts of the Dapto Smelting Works to a new site at Port Kembla. By August 1908, the 6½ mile private railway had been closed officially, and 29 chains of it already had been dismantled. When the Wongawilli Colliery was bought by C & G Hoskins, in 1916, that company built a new branch railway, which crossed the old line, by just building over it. A section of the old line was refurbished and connected to the Wongawilli branch, and then used for a time, between 1924 and 1935, by South Kembla Colliery. What remained of the old private railway was later lifted, probably around 1938. In late 1938, an old bridge built by the company was blown up, as a military training exercise.

The sum of £10,000 lodged with the Colonial Secretary, in December 1897, as security for the completion of the Illawarra Harbour port scheme, was forfeited, following the formation of the Carruthers ministry in August 1904. In October 1906, solicitors for the company demanded the return of the money, threatening legally action, which apparently never took place. In 1908, Mark Morton moved a motion to have a select committee inquire into the matter, but it was defeated, overwhelmingly by, 38 to 16 votes. The company was still trying, unsuccessfully, to have the £10,000 returned, in 1910 and 1911.

The Illawarra Harbour and Land Corporation lingered on, without ever being wound up, it seems. Major protagonists in the events had died—Thomas Andrew de Wolf, unexpectedly, in April 1903, A. B. Chippindall, also unexpectedly, in September 1903, Benjamin Fink in 1909, and Andrew Armstrong in 1921—before the company was struck from the companies' register on 31 May 1940.

Robert Amos still held his mortgage over what remained of the Lakelands Estate, in September 1904, and he apparently took possession of the land. He advertised the sale of eleven farms on a portion of the land, by an auction to be held on 10 December 1904. After his death, in December 1905, the remaining land stayed in the hands of the trustees of his estate, being gradually sold; one portion of 72 acres became a 'coursing ground'. There was another attempt to sell land there in 1919. Some land still remained in family hands, around 1927.

The company itself did still own some land on what had been the Lakelands Estate, but when sued for unpaid council rates in 1919, "the defendants did not appear". A map, from 1919, shows some land north of the smelter site as being owned by the Camden Syndicate.

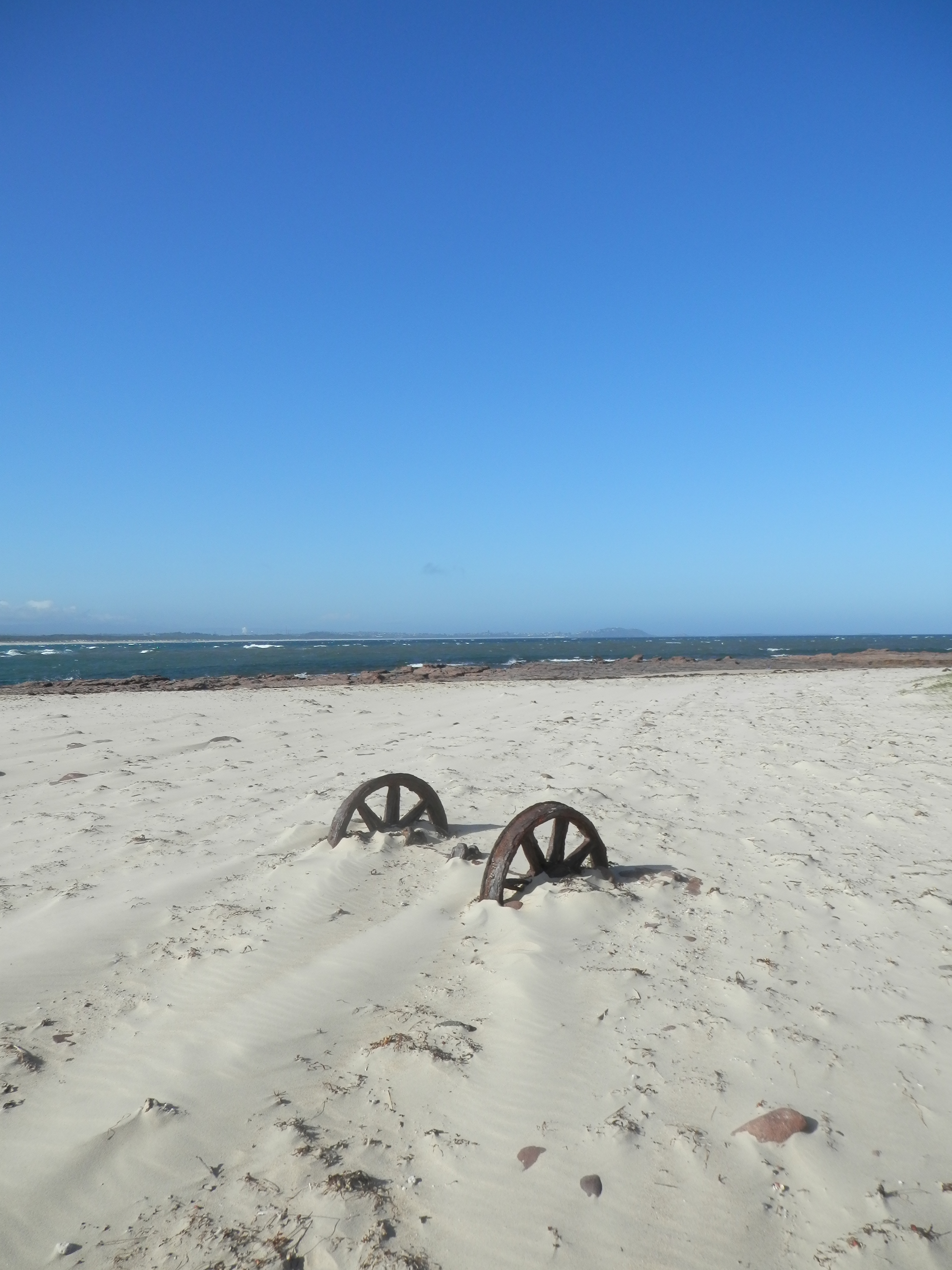
One of the sets of railway wagon wheels near Windang Island (2015)

Two parcels of land "said to be in the possession of the Illawarra Harbour and Land Corporation" were resumed by Wollongong City Council, during the 1970s. Attempts were made to gain title to three separate plots of the former company's land in Dapto, under Squatters' Rights, in 1965, 1968, and 1975. The company was no longer in existence, to oppose the claims to title over the land.

The entrance to Lake Illawarra still requires dredging, to keep it open for small craft and to maintain water quality within the lake. At times, it has closed completely due to an accumulation of sand.

== Remnants ==
Although much of the former Lakelands Estate has been developed, the intended site for the wharves remained open land in 2025. Some remnants of the long-closed smelter still exist.

There are some rusted rail wagon wheels, used in construction of the original breakwater, near Windang Island, and some of the partially-constructed 'tie bar' to the island still exists, but has been damaged by storms. Aside from these relics and some traces of its old railway line corridor and earthworks, nothing remains of the port scheme.
