= John Howell (mining engineer) =

Canadian-American mining engineer working in Australia

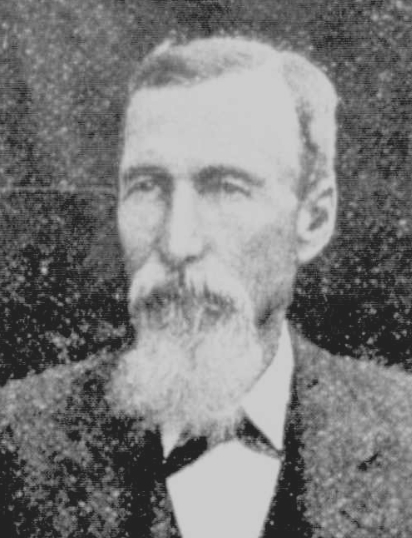
John Howell (c.1901)

John Howell (1833–1910), Canadian-born, naturalized-American mining engineer and mining industry figure, who worked in Australia from 1889. He was well known for his expertise in mining and smelting. The various ventures with which he was associated, in Australia, included, mines at Broken Hill, Dapto Smelting Works, Conrad mine, and several gold mines. Howell, New South Wales, is named after him.

== Early life ==
Howell was born in Canada and became an American citizen. An 1883 description of him, at around 50 years of age, as being "our old Nevada youth of sober, steady habits", suggests that he moved to Nevada as a relatively young man.

== Career ==
=== United States of America ===
He invented a furnace for treating the silver-lead ores of Nevada. He used this invention in two ventures of his own.

Howell, backed by "Boston capitalists", set up Howell Smelting and Mining Co., in Yavapai County, Arizona, in 1883. It was located at Lynx Creek, 12 miles south-east of Prescott, and it smelted ore from the Belle mine.

Howell was one of those who set up the company that built the Reno Smelting Mill and Reduction Works, about a mile from Reno, Nevada, on the Truckee River. It used his invention, a Howell chloridizing-furnace, as well as a ten-stamp mill, and a water-jacket furnace for smelting lead. It began operation around the end of 1886.

=== New Zealand ===
During 1888, Howell moved to the North Island of New Zealand, where he managed the Te Aroha gold mine. He refurbished the battery there, restarting operations in July 1888. The mine had insufficient supplies of suitable ore to feed the large treatment plant, and outcome was unsuccessful. Howell's involvement had been at the behest of an Australian investor in the mine, W.R. Wilson, who was a director of Broken Hill Proprietary.

=== Australia ===
==== Broken Hill ====
Instead of returning to America from New Zealand, Howell came to Broken Hill to be the general manager of the British Broken Hill mine, in 1889. While at that mine, Howell had erected an experimental furnace and successfully smelted sulphide ores.

From 1890 to 1895, Howell was the general manager of the Broken Hill Proprietary and Block 10 mines. It was Howell who successfully implemented W.R. Wilson's vision of open cut mining at the Proprietary mine, in an effort to reduce mining costs. Mining the open cut also reduced the weight of burden on the underground workings, which was carried by massive timbering. Faced with a miners' strike in 1892, Howell terminated the employment of all of the unionised workforce, and replaced them with contracted workers, from the Melbourne firm of Baxter & Sadler. He used these new workers for open-cut mining at the top of the lode, successfully, despite their being less skilled than the previous underground miners. Howell is reported to have boasted that, as a result of the changes, "we have extracted 22,000 tons more of ore, with just under 40% less men”. One of his otherwise salutary obituaries would opine that "as a manager he was a little on the weak side. He would rather side-step trouble than combat it, and probably that was why at the time of the 1892 strike he went away to Melbourne on business, and remained away till the worst of the trouble was over." Howell's actions aroused great animosity from trade unions toward BHP, but broke the power of unions at the Broken Hill mines, a situation which persisted until the Broken Hill mining strike of 1919-20.

Mining the open cut would inevitably exhaust the remaining reserves of oxide ores at the Proprietary mine, leading to a view that the mining would end sooner rather than later. Howell recommended smelters that could treat the vast reserves of sulphide ore. That approach greatly extended the life of the mine. He was general manager at the time that BHP acquired lead smelters at Port Pirie, from British Broken Hill, in 1892. The Proprietary mine already had smelters at Broken Hill, but over time would move all smelting operations to Port Pirie. It was also during his time as general manager that the company completed a reservoir at Stephens Creek, in 1892, reducing the vulnerability of the Broken Hill mines to drought.

Beginning in 1891, John Howell, Uriah Dudley (1852 – 1909)—manager of the Umberumberka mine at Silverton—and others held discussions and meetings, at Broken Hill, about forming an association of mining engineers. The inaugural meeting of the Australian Institute of Mining Engineers (later Australasian Institute of Mining and Metallurgy), with 200 members attending, was held in Adelaide during April 1893. John Howell became its provisional president and later was one of its two first vice-presidents, with F. Danvers Power. Uriah Dudley its secretary. Howell served as the mining companies' representative on a board of inquiry into the prevalence of lead poisoning in the silver-lead mines at Broken Hill, during 1892-93.

==== Other mines and smelters ====
After he left Broken Hill, Howell was a director of various mining companies, including gold mines in Western Australia and the Overflow Mine at Bobadah. He was also retained by British-owned company, Howell's Consolidated Goldmines, to select and buy Australian gold mines for the company, one of which was the Prince of Wales mine, at Reno—named after Reno, Nevada, where Howell once had a smelter—near Gundagai.

He was the managing director of the Kalgurli Mine in Western Australia, and acted as consultant engineer to the North Kalgurli Mine. In these ventures, he was associated with David Lindsay (1856 – 1922).

Howell was the first managing director of Smelting Company of Australia, which built, Dapto Smelting Works, a smelter at what is now Kanahooka, near Dapto, until May 1898. Howell had been member of the Camden Syndicate, promoters and controlling shareholders in the smelting venture. As the first managing director of Smelting Company of Australia, during the years that the Dapto Smelting Works were designed and constructed—and as a member of the Camden Syndicate—he had a major influence on the smelter's design and its business model. The smelter closed in March 1905, due in a significant part to the failure to construct the Illawarra Harbour port scheme—leaving the smelter entirely reliant upon rail transport—but also due to competition with other smelters for ore to treat and financial difficulties.

From 1896, he was mining advisor to another venture, Camden Exploration Company, formed after a reconstruction of the Camden Syndicate. The relationship between Howell and that company apparently soured; in 1899, Howell sued the company for damages for his alleged wrongful arrest under a writ of capias. Camden Exploration appears to have been a financial vehicle for the promotion of gold mining companies, one such—ultimately unsuccessful—mining venture was Mount Kimo Gold Mining and its mine near Gundagai.

In late 1899, Howell bought the site of the Clyde Smelting and Chlorination Works on a bank of Duck River at Clyde. It was reported that he planned to erect a large smelter there, but this apparently did not eventuate.

==== Conrad mine ====
Howell was known for his fascination with solving difficult metallurgical problems, and was an acknowledged expert in smelting of complex ores. He established and managed the Conrad mine, on a mining claim that he bought in 1897. The ore deposit was a complex one, containing silver, lead, copper, tin, zinc and arsenic; although a rich deposit, its complex nature had defeated previous attempts to smelt the ore. The mining village that grew up near that mine was named Howell, after him. It is probable that the Conrad mine was named after one of Howell's grandsons, the then newly-born Conrad George Howell Blakemore (1897—1976).

During the years of its initial operation, from 1898 to 1913, despite some changes in ownership, management of the Conrad mine largely remained in the hands of John Howell and his extended family. After John Howell became ill, during 1901, the mine was managed briefly by his son-in-law, George Blakemore, until Blakemore became the mine manager of the Great Cobar mine, later in the same year. Howell remained manager of the mine until at least the second half of 1903, when he succeeded in smelting stannite. Howell's other son-in-law, Brian Charles Besley, managed the mine, from at latest August 1904, with two interruptions, up to the time that the mine closed.

Long after the Howell family's involvement, the Conrad mine was refurbished, from 1948. It briefly produced ore again, between 1955 and 1957.

== Later life, family and death ==
After his official involvement with the Conrad Mine ended, Howell continued to be involved in mining in the New England region. From 1904, he had interests in tin sluicing operations, including a lease, near Tingha, that he held together with his son in law, B.C. Besley. Howell and his wife left Australia, around 1904, to reside in Los Angeles.

Howell and his wife, who went by the name 'Lizzie', had two daughters, both born in America, Sarah Marion Howell (1870—1904) and Dura Maude Howell (1871—1957). Sarah Marion married Brian Charles Besley (1864—1949) and Dura Maude, known as Maude, married George Henry Blakemore (1868—1941).

Howell's son-in-law, George Blakemore, was the son of a mine manager and had worked first as an assayer and then managed furnace operations, at Broken Hill, before he married Dura Maude Howell. Thereafter, he worked in ventures associated with his father-in-law, until he became manager of the Great Cobar. Subsequently, he became an important mining industry figure, particularly in the region around Cobar.

Howell's eldest daughter, Sarah Marion, died at Inverell in 1904, aged 34, leaving three young children. She was buried in Inverell cemetery. Howell's son-in-law, C.B. Besley, remarried in 1910, and afterwards had another two children. Unlike Blakemore, Besley did not have a mining-industry background. Before coming to manage the Conrad mine, he owned and lived at Mootwingee Station, north of Broken Hill, and was part owner and manager of a meatworks. He sold Mootwingee in 1902, moving to Sydney. After the Conrad mine closed, in 1913, he bought a rural property, at Graman, where he lived until 1929. He was living near Boneshaw when he died, in 1949, but was buried in Inverell cemetery.

Howell died at Denver, Colorado, on 12 November 1910, aged 77 years, having failed to regain his strength after surgery he had on 2 November 1910. Howell's wife had died a few years earlier. They were survived by their one living daughter, Dura Maude, and six Australian grandchildren.

== Inventions and patents ==
- Chloridizing roasting furnace for silver-lead ore
- A steam generator heated by smelter slag (with Edgar Arthur Ashcroft)
- Method of recovery of tin and other metals from stannite
- Improvements in the treatment of sulphate solutions of copper, iron, and zinc (with George Blakemore)
- Improvements in grinding and amalgamating pans

== See also ==
- Howell, New South Wales
- Conrad mine
