= Conrad mine =

Abandoned mine at Howell, New South Wales, Australia

Coordinates: 29°57′16.8″S 151°01′29.6″E

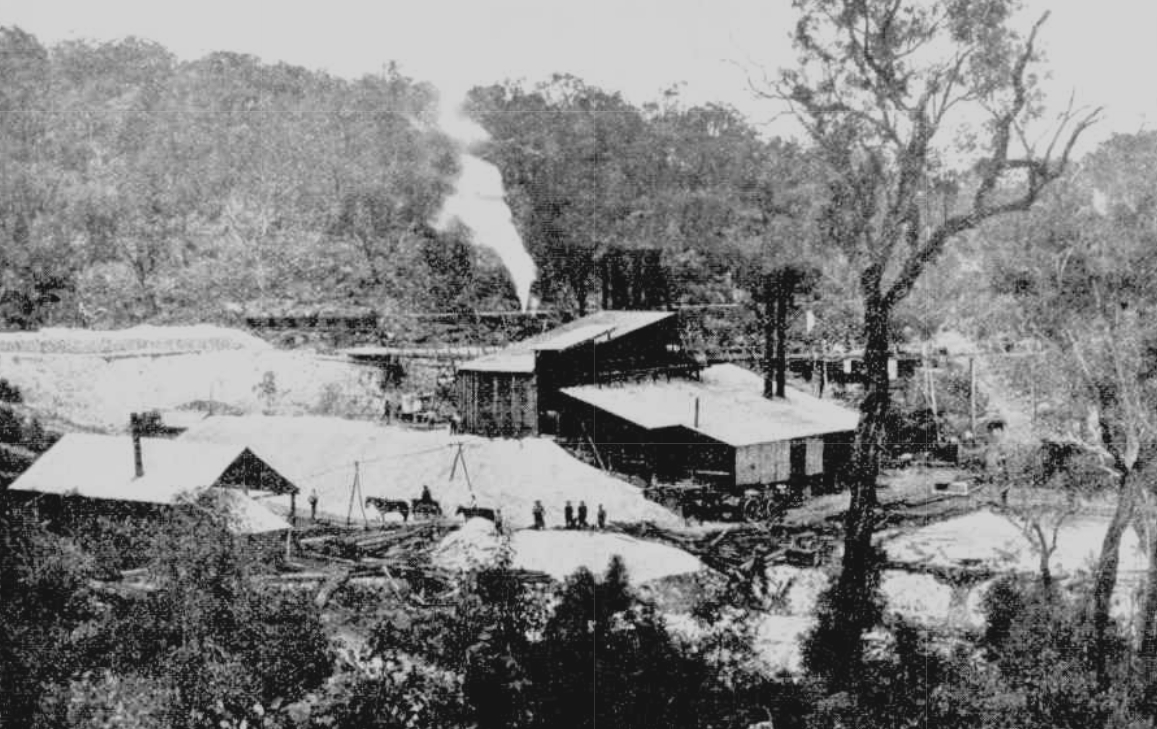
Conrad mine looking south-east (1901)

Conrad mine was a silver and base metals mine at the locality of Howell, on the western slopes of the Northern Tablelands, within the New England region of New South Wales, Australia. The mineral deposit that was exploited by the Conrad mine was a complex ore body, containing silver, lead, zinc, tin, arsenic, and copper ores, with some gold as well. From 1906, the Conrad mine's operations also included the workings of the adjacent King Conrad mine. The ore body, primarily, was worked for its silver content, but other metals and minerals were also produced. The mine was operated, between 1898 and 1913, with two interruptions, and from 1953 to 1957. It produced over 3,500,000 ounces of silver. The mine was well known as a source of rare mineral specimens.

== History of operations ==
=== Discovery and early mining ===
The presence of silver in the area had first been noticed in 1888. Small scale mining took place, but expectations of a silver boom were dashed when it was found that much of the complex ores could not be smelted, even after being taken at great expense to the smelter at Newcastle. Initially, miners extracted only the purest ores from shallow workings. The deposits in the area near Bora Creek were described in Government Geologist Edward Pittman's 1901 work, The Mineral Resources of New South Wales. The deposit consisted of a rich but complex lode, with quartz gangue, intruding into surrounding granite rock. The edges of the lode carried areas of rich silver-lead ore, and mineralisation was also dispersed throughout the quartz. Pittman noted that the Cockle Creek smelter did not accept ores from Bora Creek for smelting due to the presence of stannite.

=== Early operations (1897—1899) ===
The first deposit that would be exploited commercially at scale was found in 1890. In 1897, the mining lease was bought by John Howell (1833—1910), and it become the Conrad mine. It is probable that the Conrad mine was named after one of Howell's grandsons, Conrad George Howell Blakemore, born in 1897.

Howell was intrigued by the problem of processing the valuable but complex ores. An unusual feature of the deposit was that it contained almost entirely sulphide ores, with almost no oxide ores. Government Geologist, Edward F. Pittman, wrote regarding the deposit that, "probably no similar combination of valuable metals on a large scale has ever been worked before". When Howell had a 100 foot deep shaft sunk, in 1898, the feasibility of mining the ore body was proven. Early reports of the new mine stated that the lode was four feet six inches wide and that a ton of the ore contained 170 ounces of silver, as well as its lead content. However, it would take, until 1912, to completely solve the problem of recovering an optimal amount of the valuable content of the complex ore.

By mid-1899, there were two large mines operating in the area. The first was Howell's mine, which had become known as the Conrad mine, and the other was Alwell's claim, which became the King Conrad mine. By August 1899, there was a third mine, the Bora Creek Extended, later to be known as the 'South Blocks', 'Conrad South Blocks' or 'Conrad South' mine. The mines were all on the same line of lode and each become owned by a separate listed company.

The opening of the mines lead to the formation of a mining village, named Howell, after John Howell. The main street of Howell was Conrad Street, and it continued from the village to site of the Conrad mine.

=== Conrad Silver Lead Mining Company (No Liability) (1898—1903) ===
A company, Conrad Silver Lead Mining Company (No Liability), was formed in August 1898. The authorized capital of the company was £25,000 in £1 shares, paid to 10%. Subscribers were John Howell, his wife 'Lizzie' Howell, Howell's daughter, Maude Blakemore, son-in-law George Blakemore, and three others; Mary P. Adams, H. Edwin Moore, and Richard Festus O'Rourke, who was nominated as manager of the venture. From January 1899, O'Rourke was Vice-Consul of the United States of America in Sydney and he was also secretary of Howell Consolidated Gold Mines, another venture associated with Howell. The new company seems to have acquired the mine, from John Howell, at a value of £6,000.

At the time that the company was floated, Howell had not long resigned as general manager of the Smelting Company of Australia, the company that owned and operated the Dapto Smelting Works.

Howell's approach to processing the complex ore of the Conrad mine was to separate the component minerals, by gravity separation, into fractions that could be successfully smelted, and subsequently further refined. In 1901, the concentrator plant was reported to produce one ton of concentrates and slimes from every three to four tons of run-of-mine ore. The capacity of the mill was reported to be around 280 tons of ore per week.

The mined ore was first thrown onto a 'grizzly'. Coarser material was hand picked and the richer lumps processed by a Blake rock crusher. After crushing that ore, together with all the ore that passed through the 'grizzly', was crushed in a set of Cornish rolls, and then passed to a trommel. Coarse material from the trommel was recycled through the Cornish rolls and trommel. The fines of ore that passed through the trommel were treated in May jigs fitted in four compartments; No. 1 compartment produced galena concentrate; No. 2 produced mispickel (arsenopyrite) and lead concentrates; No. 3 produces copper and mispickel concentrates; No. 4 produces copper concentrate. The concentrates from No.3 compartment were recycled through the jigs, to further separate the mispickel and copper concentrates. The tailings from the jigs were treated in Wilfley vanners, while the slimes pass from the jigs to settling tanks, with the overflow from settling tanks collected in the dam.

=== King Conrad mine (1899—1904) ===
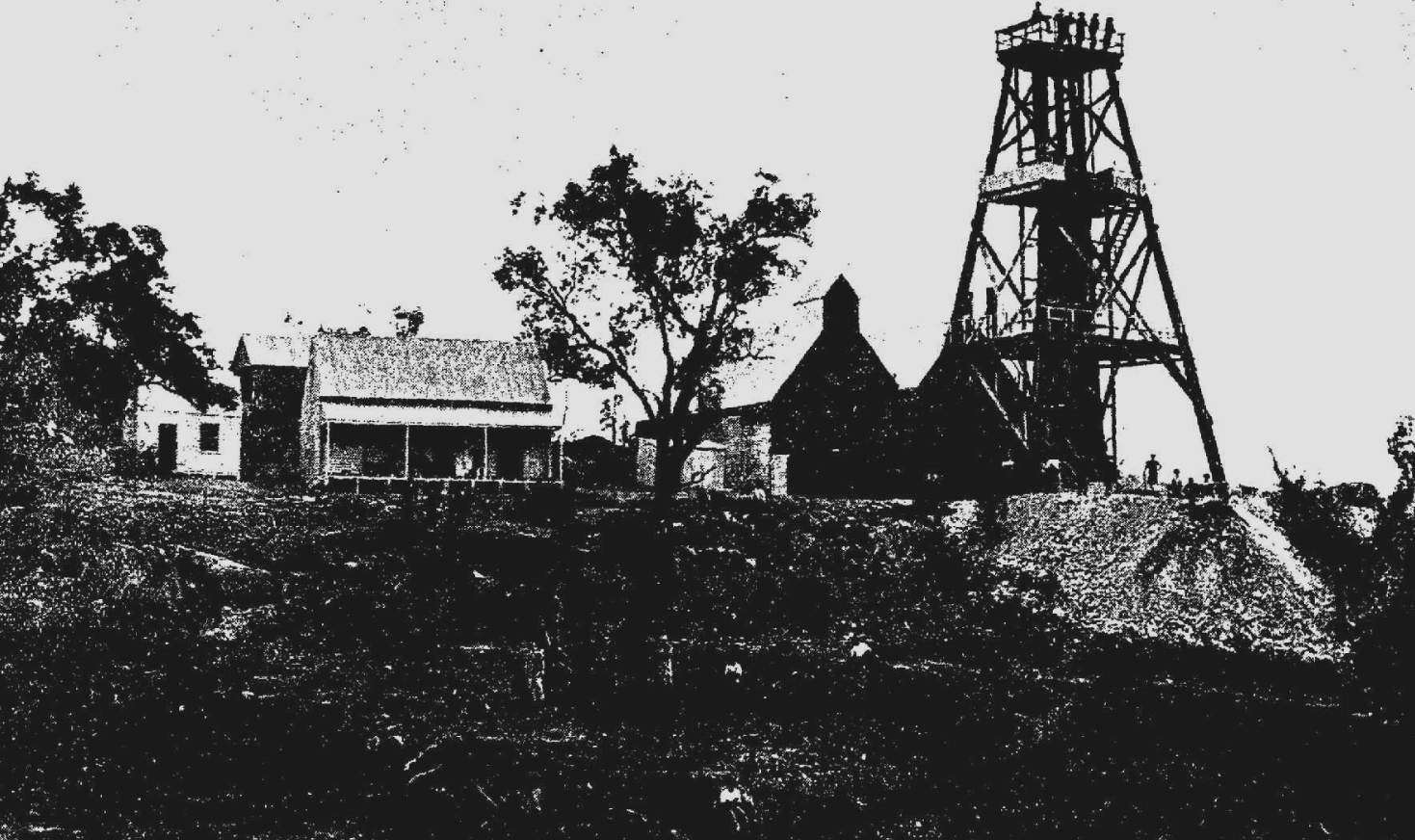
King Conrad mine (1901)

A mining lease adjacent to the Conrad mine's lease, was taken up by a local prospector, Peter Alwell, and became the King Conrad mine. Alwell and his partners sold the King Conrad to a Melbourne syndicate, for £60,000, in April 1900.

By December 1900, there was a well-equipped mine and concentrator under construction. The first meeting of new company held in June 1901 was optimistic about the future of the mine.

The mine started its mill in February 1902. By that time, the mine was down to 400 feet. The King Conrad used a similar approach to that used by the Conrad mine, separating the minerals by gravity separation.

By July 1902, the King Conrad company had run out of capital, and the mine was idle. A petition was made to wind up King Conrad Silver and Lead Mining Company in August 1902, and the company went into liquidation, in September 1902. There was an unsuccessful auction of its leases and assets, in January 1903; the company owed £12,000 to Union Bank of Sydney, as mortgagee.

By late 1902, it was apparent that the King Conrad mine would not survive alone, and rumours circulated that its mining operations would be combined with those of the adjacent Conrad mine. However, that combination would not to happen, until 1906, although the moves to do so were underway by 1904. In August 1903, there was talk of work in the King Conrad mine resuming under a new company. In November 1903, it was reported that six men were employed there making a drive toward the Conrad mine workings.

During late 1904, an English syndicate began working the King Conrad mine. H. Edwin Moore took over management of the mine, during the 12 month option. He also managed the adjacent properties of Consolidated Conrad Silver Mines. In August 1905, the syndicate extended their option to purchase the mine. The same syndicate also held an option to purchase over the properties of Consolidated Conrad Silver Mines.

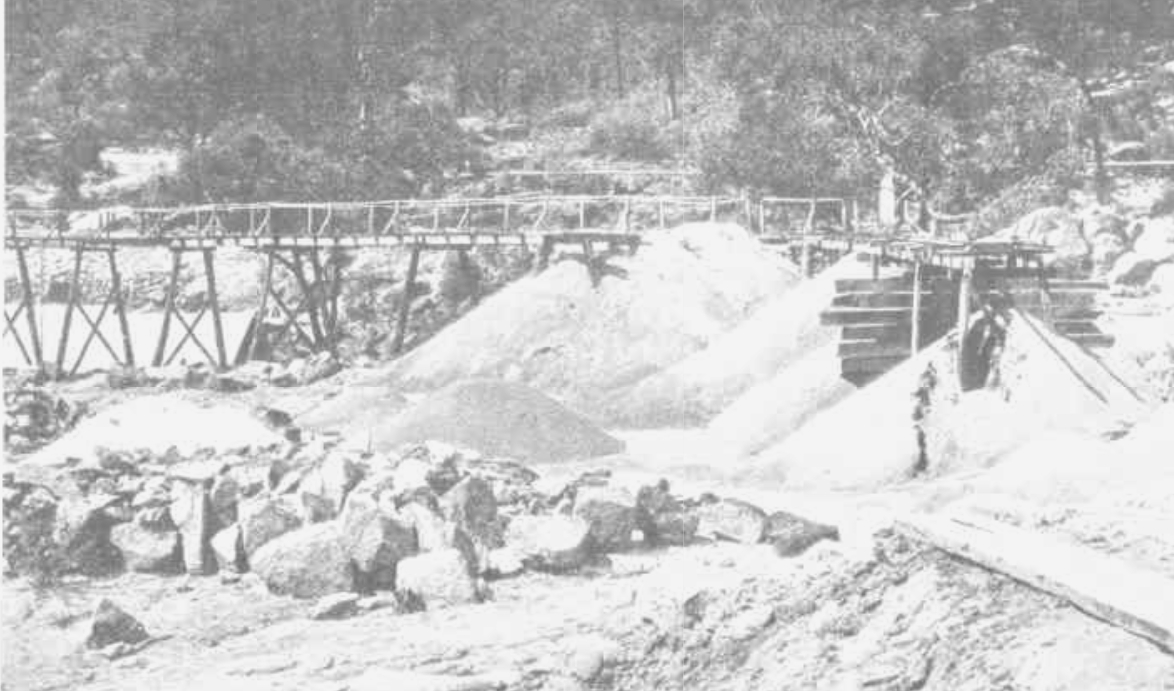
Stockpile of stannite at Conrad mine (1901).

=== The problem of stannite (1900—1903) ===
As mining progressed, more stannite was found, some in massive ore form, but also diffused through the other ores. That became a particular problem, as no smelter wanted stannite—a hitherto rarely found copper-tin-iron sulphide mineral, Cu_{2}FeSnS_{4}—and other metallic ore concentrates containing stannite were penalized by smelters, basically by not paying the mine for any of their valuable tin content. Stannite ore later caused the failure of another mine, the Tolwong Mine, on Shoalhaven River, near Bungonia.

At first the stannite was stockpiled, while Howell worked on a solution for a method of recovering valuable tin metal from the stannite. Wilfley tables were added to the concentration process, and Howell experimented with smelting the stannite in a water jacket furnace, at the mine site. He achieved success in mid 1903.

Howell's method was to smelt the stannite-rich ore and thus separate it into two salable products; an argentiferous copper matte—containing over 60 per cent copper and 300 ounces of silver per ton—and a tin-lead metal alloy—55% tin and 45% lead—which was cast into tin-lead bullion. There was a market for such materials, which could be refined further. Smelting lead ore to metal is a reduction reaction, whereas production of copper matte involves an oxidisation of the sulphide ore. Howell stated that the lead-tin was recovered from the ore, as a first step, but a smelting process that involves both reduction and oxidizing reactions was a remarkable achievement.

Any gold in the ore—and there was a very small amount present—would also end up in the matte, with the copper and silver. A refinery would first convert the matte to impure metallic 'blister copper'. The next stage of refining would be to separate the copper from the gold-silver, by electrolytic refining, producing pure 'cathode copper'. The remnant sludge was than converted to dore bullion, an alloy of gold and silver, which could be refined further.

By 1903, John Howell was around 70 years old, and his mine manager son-in-law, George Blakemore, was fully occupied in far away Cobar. The Howell family were trying to dispose of their interests in the Conrad mine and management responsibility, and seeking new investors and management to take it over. With the problem of the stannite ore appearing to have been resolved, the mine seemed to have a bright future, albeit with more capital needed. However, in 1906, doubts would emerge about whether the problem of treating the complex ore had really been solved completely.

=== Consolidated Conrad Silver Mines (1903—1905) ===
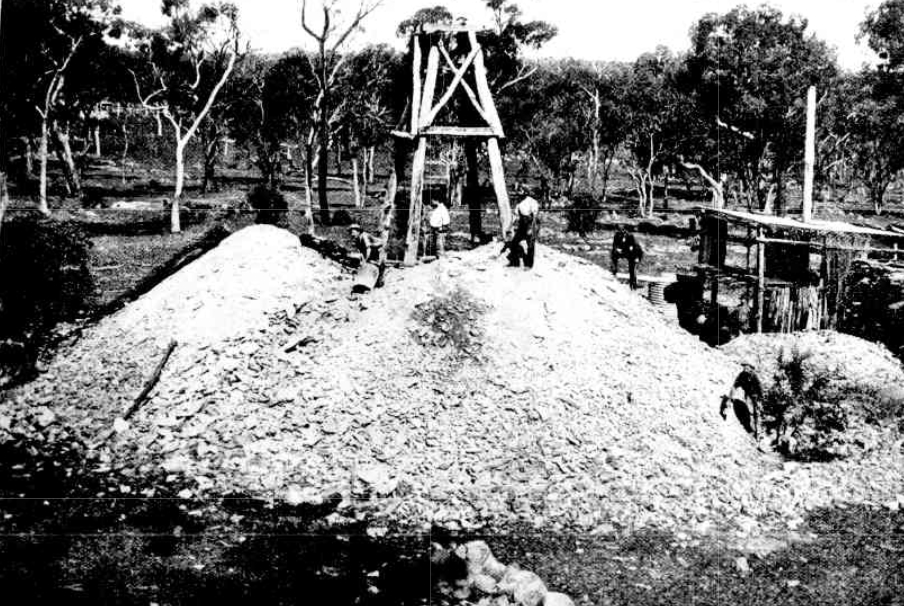
Bora Creek Extended mine (1901)

The original Bora Creek Extended mine, was in an area known as 'The South blocks', it was said to be located around two miles southward from the Conrad lease, but that distance appears to have been overstated. By 1903, it seems that it had ceased to operate, but was referred to as the Conrad South Blocks mine, or just Conrad South mine.

A new company, Consolidated Conrad Silver Mines, was floated in January 1903. It had authorized capital of £125,000—as 125,000 shares of £1 each, but 25,000 of the shares were reserved for a future issue—and working capital of £10,000. The new company took over the properties of the Conrad mine, the Conrad South Blocks mine, but not the King Conrad mine.

In February 1903, the company was setting up new smelter and dam, and had restarted the existing concentrator plant of the old Conrad company.

By late 1904, the properties of Consolidated Conrad Silver Mines and the neighbouring King Conrad mine were both under option to an English syndicate, which would become Conrad Stannite Mines Limited. Management of both mining properties was taken over by H. Edwin Moore, in late 1904.

=== Conrad Stannite Mines Limited (1906—1908) ===
By 1906, the operations of the King Conrad mine and those of the neighbouring Conrad mine properties had been consolidated, under the ownership of Conrad Stannite Mines Limited. The two mine's workings were connected by drives at the 200 and 400 foot levels. Thereafter, the two mines were worked as a single operation. A masonry dam, which still exists, was constructed during 1906, at 'Snake Gully', on Borah Creek, as was a new water jacket furnace for smelting stannite ore and tin-rich slag. Lead-silver ore, which had been separated from the stannite rich ores, was sent for smelting to the Cockle Creek smelter.

From 1908, the mine produced white arsenic, White arsenic was used in those times to poison prickly pear infestations, with only partial success, before the Cactoblastis cactorum moth was introduced from South America. Before white arsenic was captured from furnace off-gases, the poisonous compound had been released to the environment, and had killed some vegetation in the vicinity of the mine.

A report from the mine in July 1906 noted that most of the efforts of the company were devoted to developing the mine. It noted that, "Under the circumstances the local people are somewhat at a loss to understand what object the management has in view. They cannot appreciate the apparent disinclination of the company to enter upon a more vigorous policy of ore extraction and treatment. Although there is a large body of mineral, its complexity, owing principally to the variation in its contents of different metals, makes It a very difficult matter to treat profitably, and there is a local belief that the problem of how it should be handled has not been satisfactorily solved as yet."

In January 1908, after a fall in metal prices, the company reduced the wages of miners by 4d. per shift. Mine workers were locked out, as a consequence of their refusal to accept the wage reduction. The dispute was settled in January 1980, and operations had resumed by February 1908, when a miner, J. Pike, was seriously injured there in a rockfall. However, in February 1909, British investors in the company were expressing concern that the earnings were far less than had been expected. It seems that mining operations effectively ceased soon afterwards.

=== Conrad Silver Mines Ltd. (1909—1913) ===
The Conrad reopened in December 1909, under a new company, the Conrad Silver Mines, Ltd., with capital of £20,000 (or £30,000); the old company had £375,000 capital. The new company had the benefit of the mine development paid for by the old company. The new company had a Sydney-based board of directors. Three shifts began working the smelters, with 150 tons of ore per day being treated. The new company had been put together by C.B. Besley.

In 1912, largely through the efforts of the mine's chemical analyst, A.S. Winter, the last of the difficulties of treating the Conrad mine's stannite ore—dealing with the lead-tin alloy—was finally overcome.

=== Managers (1898—1913) ===
During the years of its initial operation, from 1898 to 1913, despite the changes in ownership, management of the mine largely remained in the hands of John Howell and his extended family. After John Howell became ill, during 1901, the mine was managed briefly by his son-in-law, George Blakemore, until he became the mine manager of the Great Cobar mine. Howell remained manager of the mine until at least the second half of 1903, after he succeeded in smelting stannite. Howell made a visit to America, around August 1903, leaving the Conrad mine under the management of Edgar Arthur Ashcroft. Howell's other son-in-law, Brian Charles Besley, managed the mine, from at latest August 1904, with two interruptions, up to the time that the mine closed.

H. Edwin Moore was in charge of the Consolidated Conrad and King Conrad Mines, by late 1904, in readiness for what became Conrad Stannite Mines acquisition of those assets. Like John Howell he was an American, and he had been one of the original investors in the Conrad mine, in 1898. As the first manager of the luxurious Australia Hotel, in Sydney, from 1890 to 1900, he was an unusual choice to manage the mines. He had returned to America in 1900, but apparently was back in Australia in 1904. It is likely that he was a close associate of the Howell family.

=== Accidents and fatalities (1898—1913) ===
There were at least three miners who died as a result of mine accidents at the Conrad mine. In November 1906, a timber man, George Morris, was injured by "small stone", which fell upon him; he walked home afterwards, appearing not seriously injured, but died on the following morning. On 9 April 1910, a miner Joseph Dillon, was killed in a rockfall. He was buried at Howell General Cemetery. On 27 July 1911, Ernest Foster died, also in a rockfall.

At least two miners died as a result of accidents in the workings of the King Conrad mine. On 23 December 1900, Donald Duff was struck on the back of the head by a rock that had fallen from the surface, he died on the following day without regaining consciousness. On 26 March 1908, Thomas Gagan (or Gagin) was killed when five tons of ore fell from the roof onto him.

=== Closure and aftermath (1913—1948) ===
In March 1913, the mine was closed, after a dispute over how mine workers should be paid—by day labour or contract—at a time when the silver price had already begun to fall. B.C. Besley warned that adoption of day labour wages would make the Conrad mine uneconomic, and when he lost the argument he closed the mine.

In January 1914, the mining leases and plant were put up for sale by tender. Equipment and buildings of the mine were sold at auction, over two days in June 1914. After its closure, the mine was worked by locals on a small scale, during and after the First World War, but eventually it filled with groundwater and became inaccessible.

The loss of 250 mining jobs had an immediate effect on Howell. Buildings were demolish and removed, or in some cases burned down in fires. Nonetheless, a much-diminished small village persisted. After closure of the school in 1942, by the late 1940s, the village had almost disappeared. It was described in November 1948 as "A mere handful of buildings, now reaching the ramshackle derelict state, are all that remains of a lively community."

The last manager of the mine, B.C. Besley, bought the mining leases, from the liquidator of the Conrad Silver Mines Limited, and he still held the leases in 1939. He sold an option over the mine leases in that year, but there was no revival of the mine at that time.

== Reopening and final closure (1949—1952) ==
Exploration at the old mine recommenced around 1949. During this phase, the original head frame with some additional buttressing was reused.

The Conrad mine reopened in 1953, and was later owned by Broken Hill South, which invested in a new mineral processing plant. The Conrad mine was impacted by a fall in metal prices, poor ore grades, and high production costs, and mining ceased on 27 December 1957. Its plant was dismantled during 1958-1959, but some remnants were left at the site, such as the headframe.

There was a small revival of the village, after development work commenced on the Conrad mine during 1949, although most of the workers resided at Tingha. In November 1951, the village escaped destruction by a bushfire. The closure of the Conrad mine in 1957, resulted in the abandonment of the village and the removal of twelve workers' cottages that had been erected there around 1949.

== Subsequent activity ==
=== Ore recovery (1966) ===
During 1966, some ore was obtained from the dumps near the Allwell shaft. The material that had been left in the dump had been hand-picked, without use of mechanical separation, and still contained ore. The Allwell shaft was located to the south-east of the King Conrad shaft.

=== Exploration work (2003—2006) ===
Between 2003 and 2007, the Conrad mine site, including the area covering Conrad mine, King Conrad mine, Moore Shaft and Davis Shaft, was subject to exploration work, with silver being the main target. As late as 2021, the old mine was of interest for potential mining. The work has not resulted in any renewal of mining.

== Contamination, mine site remediation, and remnants ==
A legacy of mining is the contaminated Conrad mine site, and consequent contamination of Borah Creek, downstream of the Conrad mine site, and Maid's Creek, downstream of its confluence with Borah Creek. Both Borah and Maids Creeks are part of the catchment of Copeton Dam, but fortunately there is little effect on the dam's water quality. The mine site is managed under the Legacy Mines program of NSW Resources.

In October 1913, soon after the Conrad mine closed, a resident of Copeton noted that pollution from the mine site was affecting the water quality in the Gwydir River, killing fish in the river for five miles below the confluence of Maids Creek. It had been identified, as early as 1922, that water from the Conrad mine contained dangerous levels of arsenic and needed careful handling. Significant environmental impacts from the site were identified during the 1970s. Off-site environmental impacts make the site one of the highest-risk sites in the Derelict Mines Program database.

Despite remediation work and capping of tailings dumps being carried out, the creek water and sediments were highly contaminated, in 2017—exceeding guidelines, both onsite and downstream of the mine—by contaminants carried in mine water flow and leachate from tailings dumps. A slightly acidic pH of 6 is considered normal for streams in the area, but extraordinarily acidic pH values—between 2 and 4—have been recorded on Borah Creek near the mine site. The contamination is exacerbated by the presence of insoluble arsenic compounds, as well as the metallic and acid contamination that can be expected from a base metal mine site.

Apart from the abandoned mine sites of the Conrad and King Conrad mines, there is a dam on Borah Creek, near to the former village's site, in what was once known as Snake Gully. Peter Allwell, who in 1895 found the ore deposit that became the King Conrad mine, lies in the largely forgotten cemetery of the ghost mining village of Howell. There is little else left to show that the village ever existed.

== See also ==
- John Howell (mining engineer)
- Howell, New South Wales
