= Chuck Courtney =

Chuck or Charles Courtney may refer to:

- Chuck Courtney (actor) (1930–2000), actor who starred in low-budget Westerns and dramas of the 1950s, 1960s and 1970s
- Chuck Courtney (golfer) (born 1940), American golfer
- Charles E. Courtney (1849–1920), American rower and rowing coach
- C. F. Courtney (Charles Frederick Courtney, died 1941), English metallurgist

== See also ==
- Charles Courtney Curran (1861–1942), American painter
- Charles Courtenay (disambiguation)
