= Jones Branch =

Jones Branch may refer to:

- Jones Branch (Marshyhope Creek tributary), a stream in Sussex County, Delaware
- Jones Branch (Crooked Creek), a stream in Missouri
- Jones Branch (One Hundred and Two River), a stream in Missouri
- Jones Branch (South Fabius River), a stream in Missouri
