= Uriah Dudley =

Australian politician

Uriah Dudley FIAME (c. 1852 – 8 February 1909) was a mining engineer, inventor and mine manager in Broken Hill, New South Wales and in Western Australia. He was secretary, Mine Managers Association of Broken Hill from 1890 and general secretary of the Australasian Institute of Mining and Metallurgy from its foundation in 1893 to 1897.

== Career ==
Dudley was manager of the Sydney Rockwell syndicate's mine known as "Wright's" in Broken Hill from March 1888 to 1889, when he was employed as manager of the Umberumberka silver-lead mine near Silverton. While there he was an active member of the community, teaching geology, mineralogy, mining, metallurgy and physics at the Silverton Technical School, was elected Mayor of Silverton and appointed to the Silverton licensing court in 1891. That same year he was elected president Silverton Chess Club.

Beginning in 1891, Dudley—while manager of the Umberumberka mine at Silverton— John Howell, and others held discussions and meetings at Broken Hill, about forming an association of mining engineers. The inaugural meeting of the Australian Institute of Mining Engineers (later Australasian Institute of Mining and Metallurgy), with 200 members attending, was held in Adelaide, during April 1893. John Howell became its first provisional president, and Dudley its secretary.

Early in 1895 he was appointed manager of the chloridizing plant at the Proprietary mine, then in November took over management of the Golden Bar gold mine, Coolgardie. He left Coolgardie in August 1896 after publishing optimistic reports of further finds but having no working capital to develop the mine. From March to September 1897 he managed the Golden Rhine at Menzies, Western Australia.

He was in 1899 manager of the White Rocks Silver Mine Ltd. at Emmaville, New South Wales.

In 1901, he was appointed manager of the Emperor gold mine at Day Dawn. In 1902, he was appointed JP for the Murchison district of Western Australia secretary of the Day Dawn Chamber of Mines, and in 1904 licensing magistrate.

In 1904, he left for England, where he suffered a paralytic stroke, and returned to New South Wales, where he died.

== Patents ==
Dudley was granted patents for several inventions, including in 1898 an improved continuous flow centrifugal dryer.

== Recognition ==
Dudley was elected to the Liverpool Geological Association, in 1893.

In 1896 he was elected vice-chairman of the North of England Institute of Mining and Mechanical Engineers, West Australian branch.

His portrait is included in the AIMM website gallery.

== Family ==
He was married to Emma (c. 1855 – 10 January 1916). Their only son, Charles Dudley (born 1880), drowned after his canoe capsized at Glenelg beach on 25 December 1895.
