= Jones Branch (South Fabius River tributary) =

Stream in Shelby County, Missouri, U.S.

Coordinates: 39.93631°N 91.87589°W

Jones Branch is a stream in Shelby County in the U.S. state of Missouri. It is a tributary of South Fabius River.

Jones Branch has the name of the local Jones family.

== See also ==
- List of rivers of Missouri
