= Jones Branch (Crooked Creek tributary) =

Stream in the US state of Missouri

Coordinates: 37.876433°N 91.407091°W

Jones Branch is a stream in Crawford County in the U.S. state of Missouri. It is a tributary of Crooked Creek.

Jones Branch was named after Sam Jones, an early citizen.

== See also ==
- List of rivers of Missouri
