= Jones Creek (South Dakota) =

Stream in South Dakota, U.S.

Coordinates: 45°38′40″N 103°18′57″W

Jones Creek is a stream in the U.S. state of South Dakota.

Jones Creek has the name of a pioneer hunter.

== See also ==
- List of rivers of South Dakota
