= Jones Creek (Mohawk River tributary) =

Stream in Oneida County, New York state

Location
- Country: United States
- State: New York

Physical characteristics
- Mouth: Mohawk River
  - location: Whitesboro, New York
  - coordinates: 43°08′01″N 75°16′26″W
  - elevation: 407 ft (124 m)
- Basin size: 1.15 mi^{2} (3.0 km^{2})

Jones Creek is a left-bank tributary (stream) that flows into the Mohawk River in Whitesboro, New York.
