= Edgar Arthur Ashcroft =

Electrical engineer and metallurgist (1864–1938)

Edgar Arthur Ashcroft (5 September 1864 – 24 August 1938) was an Australian electrical engineer who developed an electrolytic process for extracting zinc metal from its sulphides.

== History ==
Ashcroft was born in Sunderland, England, a son of George Ashcroft and his wife Sophia, née Davey. After qualifying as a mechanical and electrical engineer, he was brought out to Australia by Broken Hill Proprietary Ltd to install an electric lighting plant at its Broken Hill facilities. While there, he and John Howell developed a steam generator using slag from the smelters as a source of heat.

He was impressed with the vast quantities of zinc sulphide tailings at the mines, regarded as waste due to the expense and complexity of existing methods of extracting zinc metal from the ore. Collaborating with one Dr. Carl Schnabel of Clausthal, Germany, he developed a wet electrolytic method of extracting the metal, which he patented in 1894. He left BHP and in 1895 founded the Sulphide Corporation (Ashcroft Process) Limited with a capital of £1,100,000, with which it purchased Ashcroft's patents and the Broken Hill Central Mine. In 1897, Ashcroft and the corporation set up the world's first electrolytic zinc works, at the Cockle Creek Smelter, near Newcastle, New South Wales. The process failed to live up to expectations however. The problems involved in up-scaling had been minimized, and the benefits exaggerated. Despite major modifications under general managers Randolph Adams and from 1897 C. F. Courtney, the process was deemed a failure and the plant largely dismantled. The Sulphide Corporation continued in the business of refining zinc ore, but reverted to the roasting method.

Ashcroft returned to England amid controversy, and with James Swinburne continued experimentation, but despite being based on sound scientific principles, commercial success eluded them.

Ashcroft retired to Ancrum House, Roxburghshire, Scotland, and died in nearby Polton, survived by his wife Irene, née Dulier.

=== Postscript ===
Sulphide Corporation Ltd. went into voluntary liquidation in 1950, and was taken over by Sulphide Corporation Pty. Ltd., created for the purpose, a wholly owned subsidiary of Consolidated Zinc.

== Memberships ==
- Australasian Institute of Mining Engineers
- (London) Institution of Mining and Metallurgy
