= C. F. Courtney =

English metallurgist

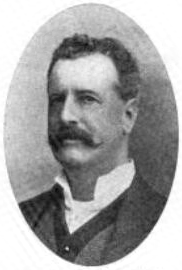
- Born: Charles Frederick Courtney; 23 November 1856; Islington, England
- Died: 27 September 1941 (aged 84); London, England
- Occupation(s): Metallurgist, mining engineer
- Spouse: Marion Dorothy Tattersfield

Charles Frederick Courtney (23 November 1856 – 27 September 1941) was an English-Australian metallurgist, manager of the Sulphide Corporation, a mining and chemical manufacturing company in Australia.

== Early life and education ==
C. F. Courtney was born in Islington on 23 November 1856. He was trained as a civil engineer in England

== Career ==
Courteney was employed with the Fairbairn Engineering Co. (perhaps William Fairbairn & Sons).

He had also worked as engineer for the Manchester Corporation.

He worked on the Tharsis Sulphur and Copper Company's works in Tharsis, Spain, for 14 years.

He was brought out from England to replace Randolph Adams as manager of Ashcroft's process at the Central Mine, Broken Hill, only recently taken over by the Sulphide Corporation. He arrived in Adelaide aboard Orizba in April 1897, and at Broken Hill in company with the Melbourne chairman J. S. Reid on 23 April. Adams had been at the Central Mine for 5 1/2 years under three different owners, and was returning to the US. The new facility at Cockle Creek, near Newcastle, had just been brought into operation under Ashcroft's direction.

Ashcroft's process for reducing zinc ore by electrolysis was abandoned as uneconomical, and around the same time an unrelated process, magnetic separation, was introduced to improve ore yield. The company became a major producer of sulphuric acid and superphosphate.

Courtney became general manager for Australia of the Sulphide Corporation Ltd. in 1903, resident in Melbourne, with a home "Granlahan" on Toorak Road, South Yarra; James Hebbard was his successor. In September 1922 Courtney left Melbourne to take up the position of the corporation's managing director in England. He resigned in 1940 due to ill health, and died in London on 27 September 1941.

== Inventor ==
- Improved magnetic separator (with Robert Butterworth, also of Broken Hill) 1899

== Author ==
- Masonry Dams from Inception to Completion: Including Numerous Formulae, Forms of Specification and Tender, Pocket Diagram of Forces, Etc.; For the Use of Civil and Mining Engineers
- The Extraction of Silver, Copper and Tin (Contributor) This book is available as a facsimile of the 1896 original, published by Kerby Jackson.

== Family ==
Courtney married Marion Dorothy Tattersfield (15 July 1852 – 1 September 1932); their son Guy Courtney married Elsie May Poole on 24 June 1913.
