= Related-party transaction =

Business transaction between connected parties

In business, a related-party transaction is a transaction which takes place between two parties who hold a pre-existing connection prior to the transaction. An example is how a dominant shareholder may benefit from making one of their companies trade with another at advantageous prices. Related party transactions can be a reason for a Type II agency relationship (conflicts among controlling and non-controlling shareholders), as they are not necessarily in the best interest of minority shareholders.

In commercial law, special regulations may apply restricting related-party transactions, such as Part 2E of Australia's Corporations Act 2001, which requires companies to seek approval from their members for such a transaction to take place.

International Financial Reporting Standard IAS 24 requires companies to disclose related-party transactions in their financial statements.

== Academies (England) ==
In England, there are restrictions and notification requirements in place regarding related-party transactions entered into by Academy Trusts. An online reporting process for declaring or seeking approval is in place. Academies must seek approval from the Education and Skills Funding Agency (ESFA) before they undertake any related-party transactions valued over £20,000. A review of related-party transactions for the 2012–2013 academic year identified 1,350 related party transactions involving 976 trusts. The vast majority of these were compliant with relevant guidance protecting public funds (the Academies Accounts Direction), but transactions at 17 trusts were found to be irregular or improper.
