= Cockle Creek Smelter =

Former smelter in New South Wales, Australia

Coordinates: 32°56′52″S 151°37′34″E

Cockle Creek Smelter was a zinc and lead smelter located at the northern end of Lake Macquarie near Boolaroo in Newcastle, New South Wales. The smelter was built in by the Sulphide Corporation in 1896 and the first attempts to refine zinc using the Ashcroft Process began in 1897 but that process was abandoned shortly after due to technical difficulties.

The plant was subsequently adapted to smelt Lead using blast furnace technology. The smelter produced large quantities of Zinc, Lead and sulfuric acid during its life. The Cockle Creek Smelter was one of the Hunter regions first major industrial site and its operation contributed to the economic growth of New South Wales and Australia.

Other materials were produced at the smelter to fill the need as required such as Cement, Superphosphate and compounds for explosive manufacture for the war effort in World War I and World War II.

A rail connection was made from the plant to the Newcastle line on 16 July 1896. The smelter closed in September 2003, since it had become uneconomic.

The land has since been remediated, and now houses a Costco warehouse as well as a housing estate.

== Environmental issues ==
The operation of the Pasminco smelter for over a century resulted in soil contamination of surrounding areas such as Boolaroo, Argenton and Speers Point by lead and other heavy metals. During the last decades of its operation local opposition to the pollution produced by its activities began to develop but was stymied by skillful public relations which emphasized the economic benefits which accrued to the local community. Following cessation of its operations due to insolvency and appointment of the insolvency practitioner Ferrier Hodgson as voluntary administrator in September 2001 under the Corporations Act 2001 there was environmental remediation of the site of smelter and nearby properties with some buyouts and teardowns; aid in removing 5 centimeters of contaminated soil was extended to 18 adjoining landowners with contamination of 2,500 parts per million or more of lead. This partial cleanup was signed off on by the state government which in 2008 released Pasminco from a 1995 requirement that adjoining properties with lead levels above 600 parts per million be remediated, substituting a much less stringent "lead abatement strategy" (There is no mechanism in Australia analogous to the Superfund mechanism in the United States). Much of the soil in the surrounding area remains hazardous waste, however, and could not be deposited in a local tip. Pasminco was restructured in 2002 by Ferrier Hodgson, its voluntary administrator, as Zinifex. Zinifex was merged into OZ Minerals, then purchased by the Chinese state-owned China Minmetals, which then, with Australian participation, formed Minerals and Metals Group. The successor in interest to Pasminco has apparently been able to avoid continuing legal liability by virtue of skillful legal structuring of the transaction transferring the interest. As of 2014 a total of $670 million remained in the hands of Ferrier Hodgson, Pasminco's administrator which, on the basis of completion of the cleanup, is slated to be paid to its creditors.
