= Reno, New South Wales =

Locality in New South Wales, Australia

Reno
- Town
- Interactive map of Reno
- Coordinates: 35°01′21″S 148°03′01″E
- Country: Australia
- State: New South Wales
- LGA: Cootamundra-Gundagai Regional Council
- Location: 385 km (239 mi) WSW of Sydney; 169 km (105 mi) WNW of Canberra; 7.8 km (4.8 mi) NW of Gundagai
- Established: 1900

Government
  - State electorate: Cootamundra
  - Federal division: Riverina

Population
  - Total: 131 (2021 census)
- Postcode: 2722
- County: Clarendon
Localities around Reno
Burra Burra	Burra Creek	Coolac
Nangus	Reno	Tucker Box
Tumblong	Gundagai	Gundagai

Reno is a rural locality in the Cootamundra–Gundagai Regional Council local government area of the Riverina region, of New South Wales, Australia. There was once a gold mining village of the same name. For many years, until at least 2016, the locality was known as Jones Creek. Its population at the 2021 census was 131.

== Location ==
Reno is located immediately to the north-west of Gundagai. The locality consists of parts of the valleys of two creeks, Jones Creek and Back Station Creek, both right-bank tributaries of the Murrumbidgee River, and the three ranges of hills that border the two creek valleys.

The area now known as Reno lies within the traditional land of Wiradjuri people.

== Name ==
The locality of Reno takes its name from the former mining village. In turn, the mining village was named after the city of Reno, Nevada, the early growth of which was boosted by being the rail junction for Virginia City and vast silver and gold deposits of the Comstock Lode. The former name of the locality, Jones Creek, refers to one of the watercourses that flows through it.

== History ==
=== Gold mining ===
==== Prince of Wales gold mine ====
The main gold mine in the area was the Prince of Wales gold mine. It was operated together with another mine known as the Sybil mine. Bought by a London syndicate, Howell's Consolidated Gold Mines, in 1896, with the aim of a major expansion, by mid 1900, the mine was employing 350 men. From mid 1898 to around 1900, the manager of the mine was George Henry Blakemore, who was also the General Manager of Howell's Consolidated Gold Mines. Herbert Hoover, a future US President, worked for a time as a young mining engineer at the Prince of Wales mine.

There were stamper batteries, in total thirty stamper heads. Near the mine entrance were a poppet head, 55 feet high, winding machinery, sawmill, farrier's shop, the stamper batteries, and the manager's residence.

The mine being atop a hill, water was pumped from Jones Creek, at 2,000 gallons per hour, 870 feet uphill, to the higher of two dams. From there, any excess water overflowed into the lower dam. Water was pumped from the lower dam to another excavated dam that fed the stamper batteries. A fourth dam was reserved for the domestic water supply. The mine itself also needed pumping out to keep some levels dry enough for mining.

In 1899, the main haulage shaft was 300 feet deep. From there, a separate shaft, with ladder access, descended to the 500 foot level. The mine was pumped out using a steam pump, at the bottom of the main shaft, where there was also a steam winch, used to lift from the 500 foot level to the 300 foot level. A well at the bottom of the main shaft, at 300 foot level, was used to capture seepage and to condense steam exhausted by the two steam engines. The well was the site of a horrendous death by scalding, in September 1899, when a platman accidentally stepped into an open lift compartment and fell a short distance, into the well of hot water.

The large steam engine, powering all thirty stamper heads, had serious damage in July 1900, resulting in no gold production for around six weeks, while parts were obtained from James Martin in Gawler, South Australia. At around the same time, the mine installed a second-hand air compressor, to power rock drills, and extended its main shaft to 500 feet in depth.

In October 1900, the Prince of Wales mine was the scene of a remarkable survival. Samuel Lecount, on the day after he had been married, fell into the shaft, from the 300 foot level of the mine. After he had fallen around 80 feet, his leg became entangled in a knocker line (a rope used for signalling in mine shafts, prior to electrical signalling), tearing his calf and exposing the bone in his leg, but saving his life. In 1921, he died in another fall, this time of 400 feet, down a shaft, at the Mount Boppy mine, at Canbelego.

Reportedly, the amalgamation gold recovery process that was used left a significant proportion (20% to 25%) of the gold in tailings, and was inefficient compared to more modern methods, such as the cyanide process. After producing nearly £100,000 worth of gold—another source says £122,000—the London-based directors took a decision to close the mine and sell it and its equipment. The mine closed in October 1902, after five years of operation, but mining by tributers continued. An auction failed to attract any bids, but later negotiations for its sale took place and the mine was sold. A Mr Edquist processed the rich tailings, using the cyanide process, from around 1902 to at least early 1907.

Shares in the Prince of Wales mine were floated in Melbourne in August 1904, with plans to commence operation using the 10-head stamper battery that remained at the site. The mine reopened in December 1904. At the time of reopening, there were reportedly 80,000 tons of tailings, with a significant gold content, which were sold off separately to the mine and its equipment. The renewed operation was brief; the company could not pay its debts, and its lease and assets were sold at auction in March 1906. In the meantime, the tailings had been treated, using the cyanide process, by a Mr Wilkinson, formerly of Barmedman.

By June 1911, the mine had been closed for six years and was once again in the hands of tribute miners. In 1916, it was reported that the equipment of the 500 foot deep mine was still there, but the support timbers were rotting. Remnants of the machinery of the Prince of Wales gold mine still existed in 1982.

==== Long Tunnel mine ====
There was another rich gold mine, the Long Tunnel Mine, at the southwestern end of the modern-day locality. Gold mining in that area dates from 1883, but reef mining operations began in October 1894. Originally known as the Long Flat mine, it was renamed the Long Tunnel mine, around 1897, after a 400 yard tunnel had been driven into the hillside to allow easier access quartz reef at the 180 foot level. During this period the mine was owned by George Rice, discoverer of the reef, and James Robinson, the owner of the land upon which the mine was situated, the Kimo estate. Some very rich patches of reef were found, including a ton of quartz that yielded £1,000 worth of gold.

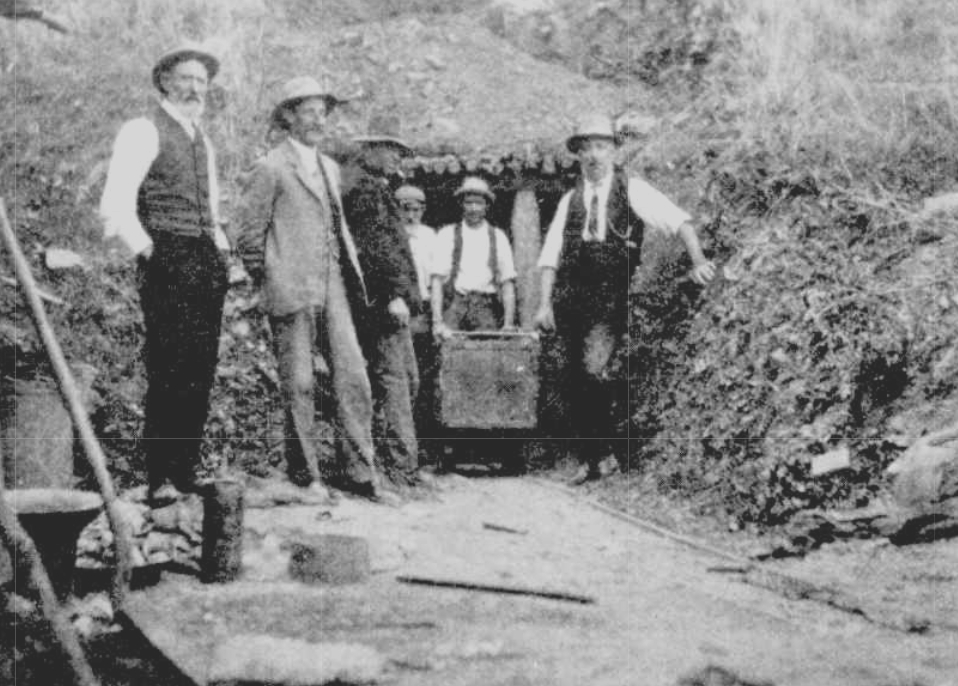
Syndicate members at entrance to the Long Tunnel mine (1911).

The mine closed around 1900, and the mining lease eventually lapsed. In 1910, it was reopened, by a syndicate, including James Robinson and some local Gundagai businessmen, but not George Rice. The two original partners had fallen out, after Robinson had planned to take out a new mining lease over the mine, on his own. Rice and some local businessmen became aware of that plan, formed a syndicate, and obtained the new lease first. However, circumstances later forced Rice to sell his share, and the highest bidder was none other than Robinson. By May 1911, miners were extracting rich gold-bearing quartz. Rice, already in poor health, died at the end of August 1912, a pauper, with his funeral being paid by the shareholders of the mine. An observer at the time noted that the mine had been "practically worthless" when Rice owned it, but "Now the gold is coming out of it in pieces so pure that dynamite won't burst the quartz".

The mine was sold to another syndicate, Long Tunnel Mining Company, in 1917. It closed again around 1925, and was in the possession of receivers from January 1926. The mine last reopened, after it was bought by a local syndicate at the beginning of the 1930s. It continued to operate until around 1941, when its last manager, Harry Kenny, died. The final end of the mine came in November 1942, when its equipment and buildings were sold.

The mine's name lives on in modern-day Long Tunnel Road, which ends near the old mine site, which is also near the headwaters of Long Tunnel Creek.

==== Johnston's Hill ====
A company, Mount Kimo Gold Mining, was floated in London, in 1897, to expand a gold mine at Johnston's Hill. The location of the mine was west of the Prince of Wales mine. £160,000 was raised in the capital, and a significant processing plant was being established at the mine, together with a settlement of around 200 people. A road was constructed to Johnson's Hill, beginning at the crown of the hill leading to Reno.

The mine was a disappointment and it was closed before much of its new and expensive equipment had been erected. The now long-forgotten mine is noteworthy for the transport of its huge 21-ton 8-cwt boiler. It had taken around seven weeks to move the boiler the eight or so miles from Gundagai to the mine, as its weight damaged bridges and ploughed roads along the route, delaying progress. Then, in 1901, the boiler was hauled, from the mine back to Gundagai, by a team of 32 bullocks, two horses and seven men, on a specially designed 'trolley', taking only eight days. Once in Gundagai, the boiler was sent by rail to the ironworks of William Sandford at Lithgow.

A small but rich mine, at Johnston's Hill, was the Turn of the Tide mine. It was first owned by its discoverer, Roberts, and a Gundagai grocer, Corbett. In February 1897, 146 oz 17 dwt of gold was produced from 11 tons 8 cwt of ore. It employed around 18 men. The reef was discovered around December 1896. It was being mined by tributers, by the end of 1898, still producing 3 oz to the ton. It was still in production, from 1906 to at least 1915, being operated, by Collingridge.

=== Mining village of Reno ===
A mining village, named Reno, was established near the Prince of Wales gold mine. The village was laid out in 1900, and was proclaimed on 28 August 1900. The village site was in a saddle, and was on the northern side of the road to Gundagai. That road, modern-day Reno Road, where it passed through the village site was officially known as Prince Street. Modern-day Long Tunnel Road branches off further along Reno Road, about 1.7 km north-west by road from where the village stood. The mine and its surface installations were to the south, on the other side of a mine water supply dam that was constructed on Bushman's Daughter's Gully.

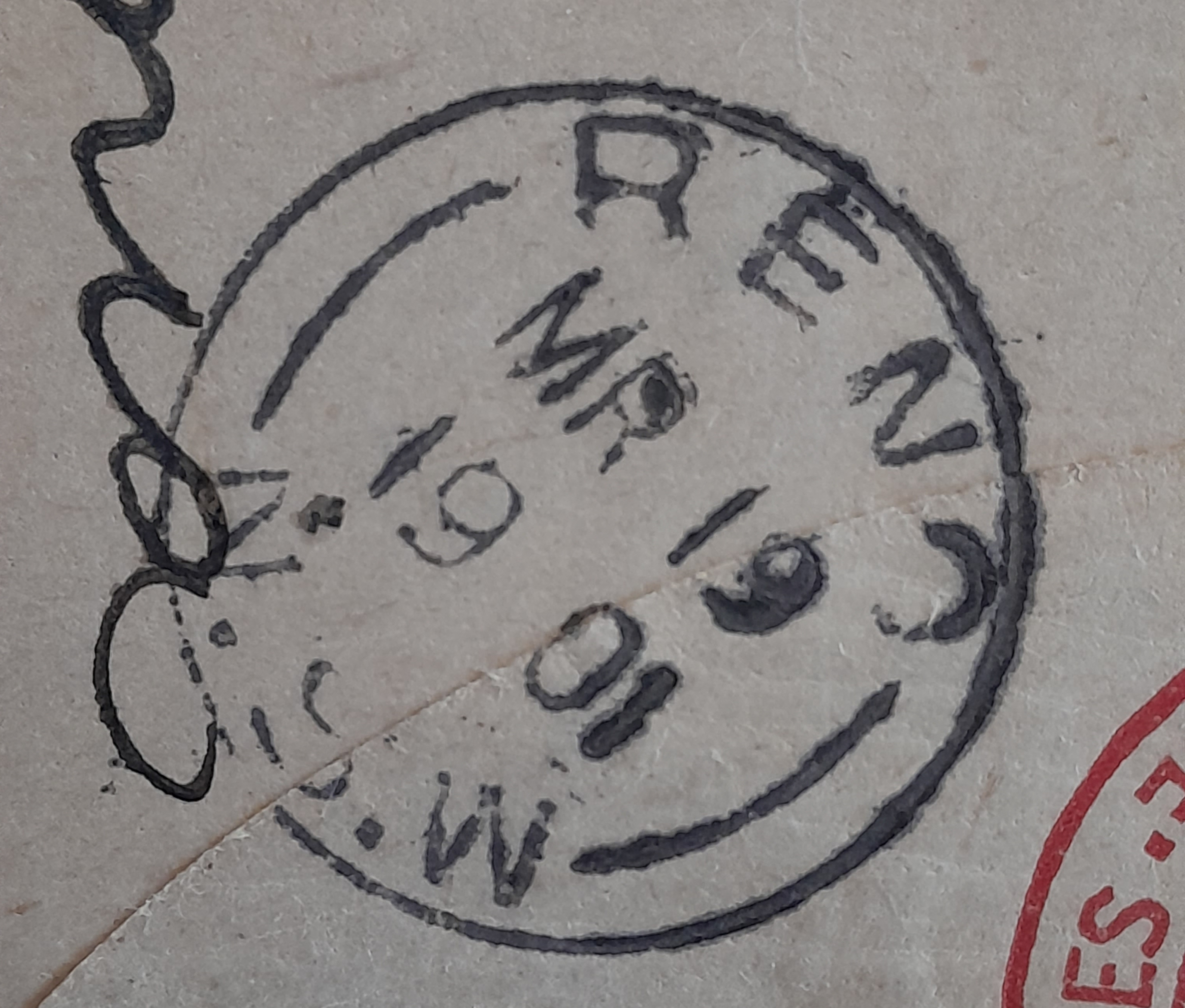
Postmark of Reno

Before the proclamation there had already been an informal settlement there, a 'mining camp'; the population in 1899 was around 700, and reached 1,200 in 1900. A school opened in April 1900, and had 90 pupils that year. A hotel known as the Prince of Wales Hotel opened, in May 1899; it was situated at the corner of Howell and Barton streets in the newly-surveyed village. As well as the hotel there were shops, including a general store, bakery, butcher, and chemist (pharmacy). The post office opened in August 1898, and the village had a telegraph connection, via a line to Gundagai post office, from late September 1899.

There was a Catholic church, Sacred Heart, and a Catholic school. An old Salvation Army hall, from Gundagai, was relocated to Reno, for use by Anglicans and Wesleyans.

Predating the hotel was a venue known as 'the Kimo Workingmen's Club', which achieved some notoriety, apparently as a means to circumvent liquor licensing laws; its building was eventually replaced by a drapery shop in 1901. There was also another 'club' known as the 'Prince of Wales Workingmen's Club', which had similar aims. Reno had a two-room police station, from 1899, with one constable, whose first task was reported to have been "sorting out 'undesirables'."

Gundagai medical practitioner and noted amateur photographer, Dr Charles Louis Gabriel, took a number of photographic images at Reno, around 1900. The images reveal that, while the mine buildings were typically robust industrial buildings for the time, the shops and dwellings of the village and its immediate surroundings were of primitive construction, being slab huts with corrugated iron or tree bark roofing. The hotel was a substantial building; the land upon which it was built was the only allotment in the village that was ever taken out as a freehold. The public school stood on dedicated land, immediately to the south-east of the area covered by the village plan. The mining company provided a Literary Institute, situated close to the mine, which had a reading room; William Lyne agreed to be its patron.

The early end of large scale gold mining at the Prince of Wales mine, compounded by Reno's relatively close proximity to the larger town of Gundagai, resulted in the rapid decline and eventual complete disappearance of the village. The police station had closed by the end of 1905. The post office closed in April 1910. The hotel was still trading in 1907, but the hotel building was being used as a private residence, when it was destroyed by fire in March 1911. By June 1911, all that remained of the village was the public school, one dwelling, a church, and the mine buildings. The school had only one teacher and around 16 children in 1917; it closed in October 1921. The church buildings were sold in October 1923, presumably for demolition or relocation. In August 1928, the Lands Board leased the, by then, nearly-deserted 40 acre village site, for use as a poultry farm. The design of the village was cancelled in January 1931.

It took until November 1967 to revoke the dedication of the school land, by which time "Reno" was no longer used to describe the locality; the old school name appeared in inverted commas in the notice. The former village's name once again became used for the locality only after 2016.

== Present Day ==
The locality is predominantly rural. The land is mainly used for grazing, with some cropping on the alluvial flats of the Jones Creek valley.

A dam, at the side of the hill upon which the Prince of Wales mine once stood, although now altered, is a remnant of gold mining.
