= Howell, New South Wales =

Locality and ghost town, in New South Wales, Australia

Howell
- Town
- Interactive map of Howell
- Coordinates: 29°56′46.4″S 151°01′52.2″E
- Country: Australia
- State: New South Wales
- LGA: Armidale Regional Council
- Location: 566 km (352 mi) N of Sydney; 30 km (19 mi) SSW of Inverell; 112 km (70 mi) NW of Armidale

Government
  - State electorate: Northern Tablelands
  - Federal division: New England
- Elevation: 750 m (2,460 ft)

Population
  - Total: 31 (2021 census)
- Postcode: 2360
- County: Hardinge
- Parish: Mayo
Localities around Howell
Copeton	Auburn Vale	Gilgai
Lake Copeton	Howell	Tingha
Bundarra	Stanborough	Stanborough

Howell is a locality, on the western slopes of the Northern Tablelands, within the New England region of New South Wales, Australia. There was once a mining village of the same name, now a ghost town. Much of the effective western boundary of the locality is part of the shoreline of Lake Copeton, as a portion of the locality is now inundated. Howell is mainly forested, with some land cleared for agriculture.

The area now known as Howell lies on the traditional lands of Kamilaroi people.

The name Howell also is applied to an endangered ecological community, Howell Shrublands in the New England Tableland and Nandewar Bioregions, based on distinctive natural vegetation. It is characterised by low shrubs, in particular Babingtonia densifolia and Homoranthus prolixus. However, the mix of species at sites varies considerably over time, including when all shrub species may be absent, resulting in a natural grassland, or when some eucalypts and cypress pines may be present, forming a low open shrubby woodland.

== History ==
=== Name ===
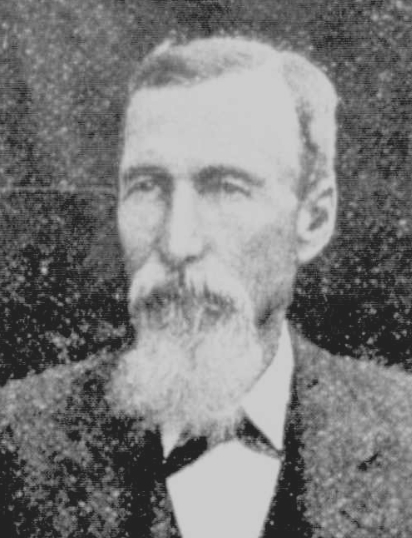
John Howell (c.1901)

The modern-day locality of Howell takes its name from the former mining village, which was named after John Howell (c.1833—1910). He was a Canadian-born naturalized-American mining engineer and mining industry figure. Howell came to Broken Hill to be the general manager of the British Broken Hill mine, in 1889. From 1890 to 1895, Howell was the general manager of the Broken Hill Proprietary and Block 10 mines. Howell was also a director of various mining companies, including gold mines in Western Australia and the Overflow Mine at Bobadah.

After he left Broken Hill, Howell was the first managing director of Smelting Company of Australia, which built, Dapto Smelting Works, a smelter near Dapto, until May 1898.

He then established and managed the Conrad mine, on a mining claim that he bought in 1897. The mining village that grew up near that mine was named Howell, after him. It is probable that the Conrad mine was named after one of Howell's grandsons, Conrad George Howell Blakemore.

Prior to the proclamation of the village, the area was known as Bora Creek, after the name of a watercourse, now spelled Borah Creek. Apparently, the name Bora Creek continued in use, alongside Howell for a period. (Borah Creek is coincidentally also the name of another modern-day locality, which is closer to Manilla.)

=== Mining ===
==== Silver and base metals ====
The presence of silver in the area had first been noticed in 1888. Small scale mining took place, but expectations of a silver boom were dashed when it was found that much of the complex ores could not be smelted, even after being taken at great expense to the smelter at Newcastle. Initially, miners extracted only the purest ores from shallow workings.

The first deposit that would be exploited commercially at scale was found, in 1890, and its mining lease was bought by John Howell in 1897. Howell was intrigued by the problem of processing the valuable but complex ores, stating that, "probably no similar combination of valuable metals on a large scale has ever been worked before". When Howell had a 100 foot deep shaft sunk, in 1898, the feasibility of mining the ore body was proven, but it would take until 1912 to completely solve the problem of recovering an optimal amount of the valuable content of the ore.

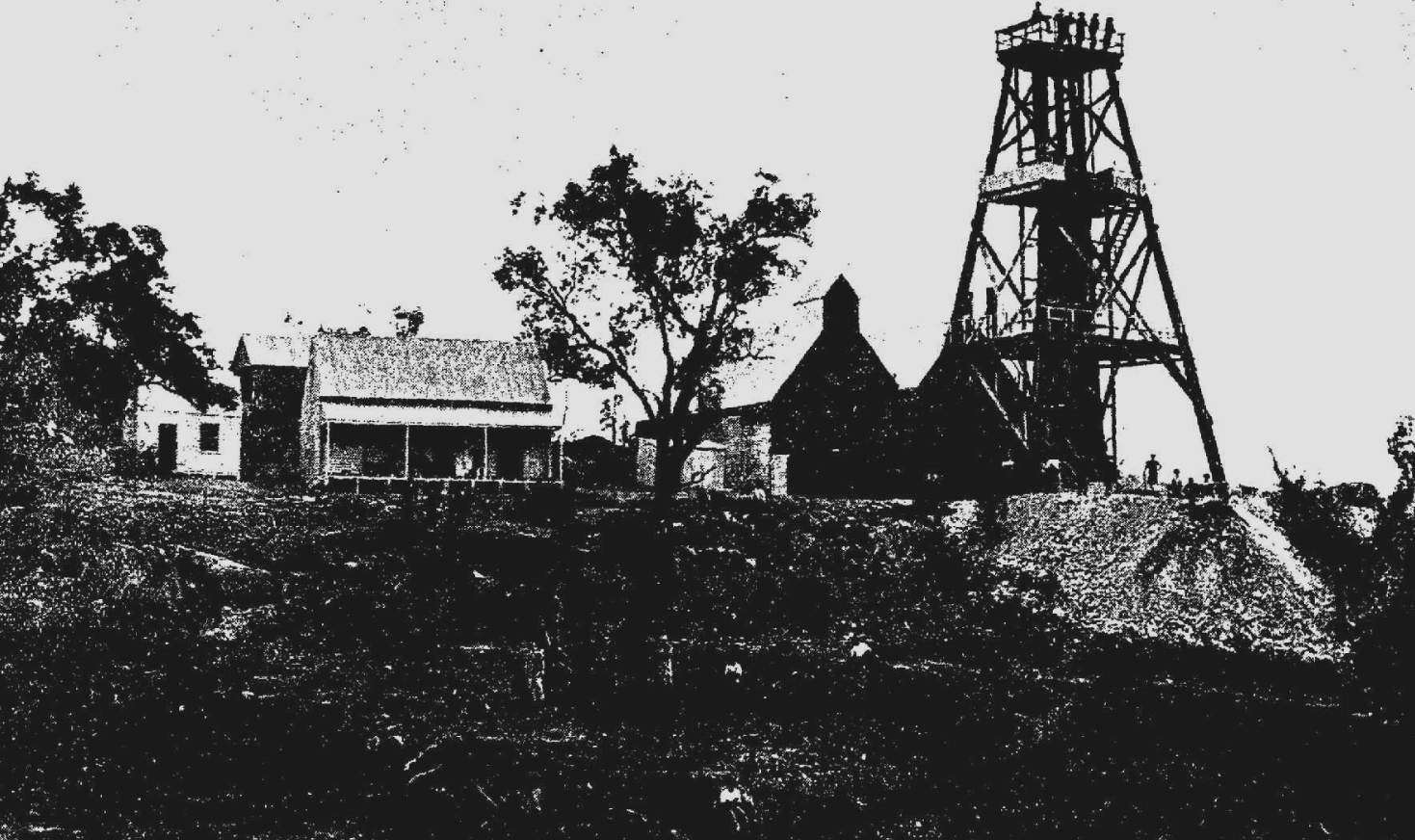
King Conrad mine (1901)

By mid-1899 there were two large mines operating in the area. The first was Howell's mine, which became known as the Conrad mine, and the other was Alwell's claim, which became the King Conrad mine.

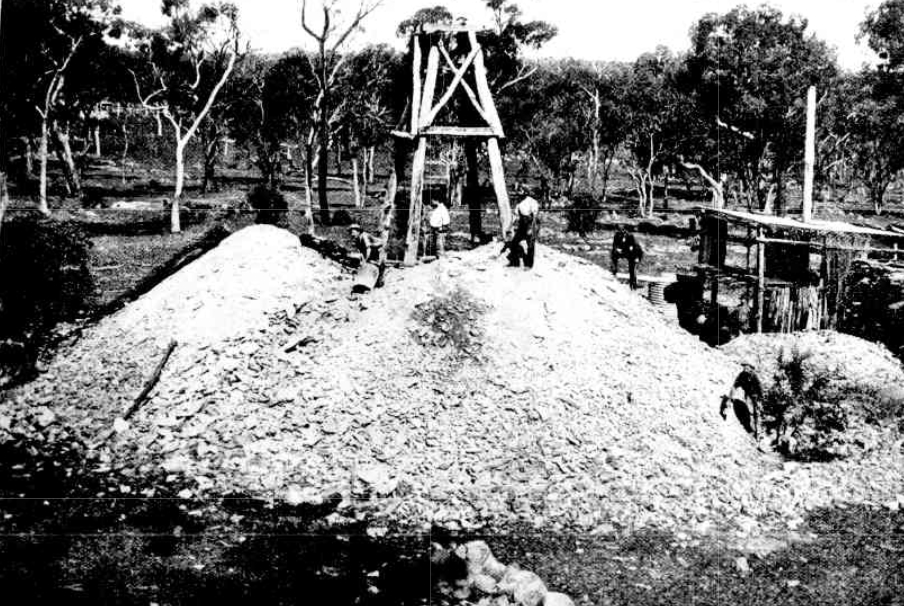
Bora Creek Extended mine, 1901

By August 1899, there was a third mine, the Bora Creek Extended, in an area known as 'The South blocks', which reportedly was located around two miles southward from the Conrad lease.

The three mines were all on the same line of lode and each become owned by a separate listed company.

==== Alluvial diamonds and tin ====
At the headwaters of Bora Creek (now spelled Borah Creek), which are in the modern-day locality of Howell, there were mining leases for alluvial diamonds, where alluvial tin was also obtained. In August 1899, the area was already being explored for diamonds, when a rich find of diamonds and tin was made on Bora Creek, and extensive operations began in the area.

==== Conrad mine ====
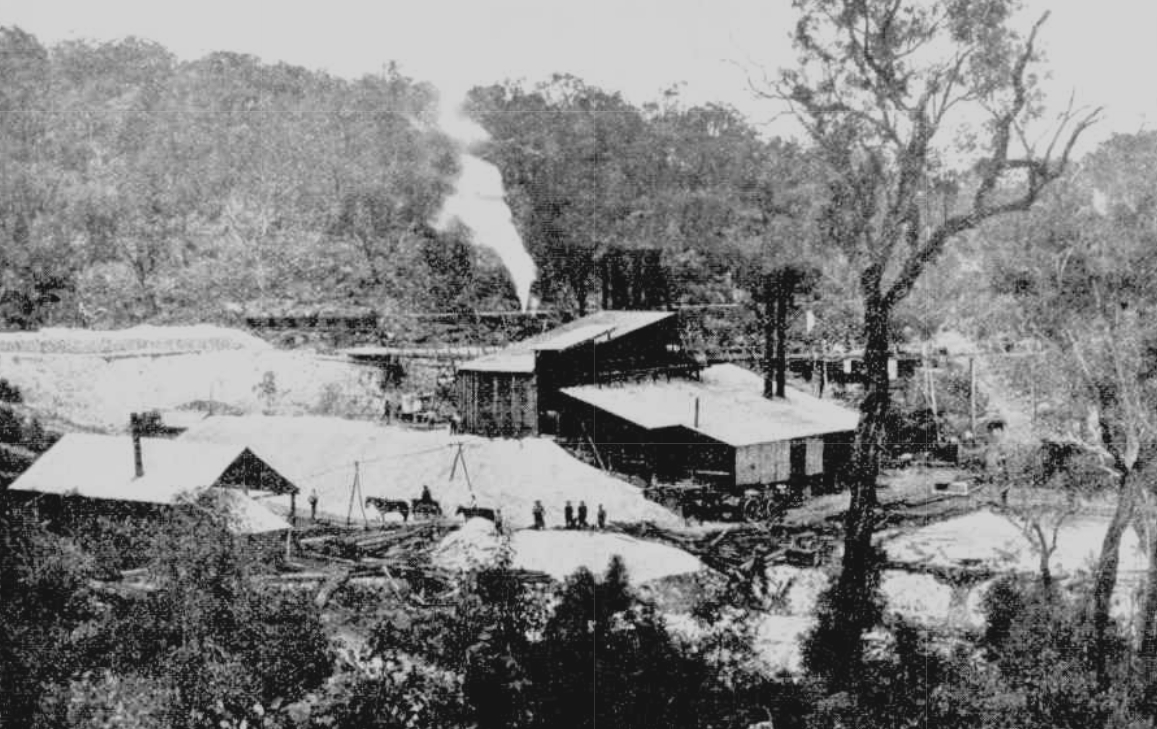
Conrad mine, looking south-east (1901)

The mineral deposit that was exploited by the Conrad mine was a complex ore body, containing silver, lead, zinc, tin, arsenic, and copper ores, with some gold as well. The ore body, primarily, was worked for its silver content. It was operated, between 1898 and 1913, with two interruptions and changes in ownership structure, and from 1949 to 1957. It produced over 3,500,000 ounces of silver. However, other metals and minerals were produced; lead in the form of galena and later as silver-lead and lead-tin bullion, copper in the form of copper matte, and arsenic (then called 'mispickel') first as arsenopyrite and later as white arsenic.

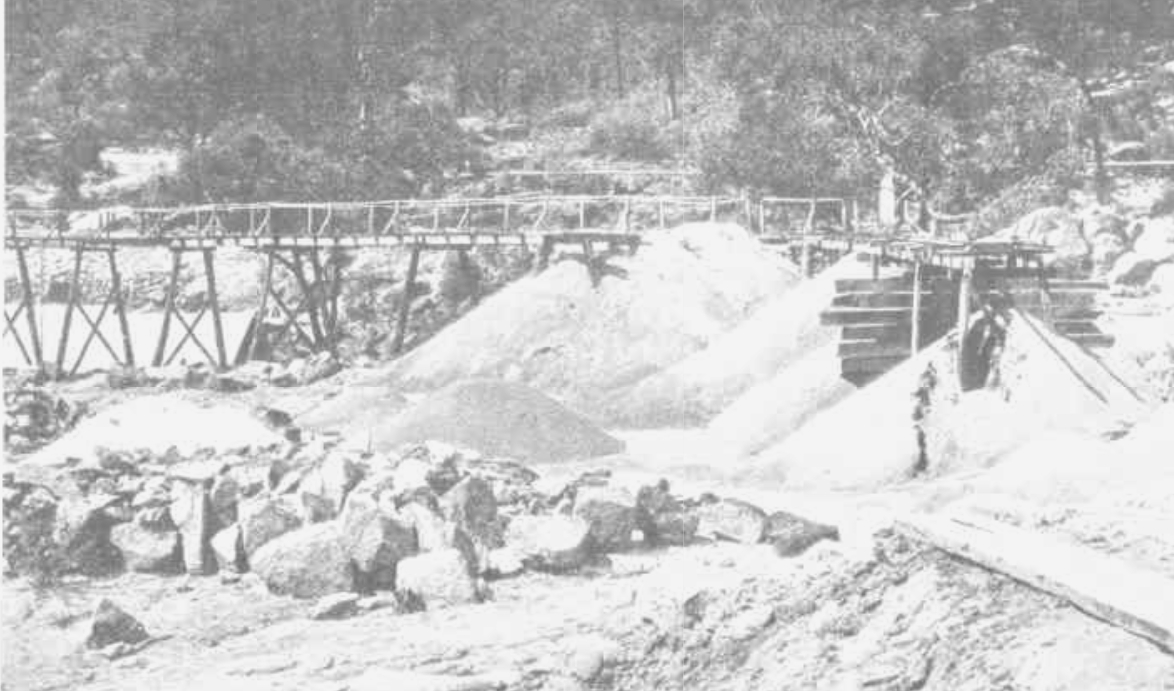
Conrad mine, stannite stockpile (1901)

Although tin is valuable, in 1900, when mining encountered significant amounts of stannite—a hitherto rare complex sulphide ore of copper and tin, Cu_{2}FeSnS_{4}—treating it and other base metal ores that contained some stannite became a serious issue for the mine. Initially, the stannite was stockpiled, awaiting the implementation of a suitable process. The problem was partially solved by John Howell, around 1903—the mine began producing lead-tin bullion—but only completely solved, in 1912, not long before the mine's first lengthy closure.

From around 1904, a drive had connected the Conrad mine to other workings at a winze under the Moore shaft, which lay to the south-east along the same line of lode.

By 1906, the operations of the Conrad mine and the neighbouring King Conrad mine had been consolidated, under the ownership of Conrad Stannite Mines Limited. The two mine's workings were connected by drives at the 200 and 400 foot levels. Thereafter the two mines were worked as a single operation.

From 1908, the mine produced white arsenic, which was used in those times to poison prickly pear infestations, with only partial success, before the Cactoblastis cactorum moth was introduced from South America. Prior to capturing the white arsenic from furnace exhaust gases, the poisonous compound had been released to the environment, and it had killed some of the vegetation in the area near the mine smelter.

In March 1913, the mine was closed, after a dispute over how mine workers should be paid—by day labour or contract—at a time when the silver price had already begun to fall. During 1913, the plant was dismantled and sold off. After its closure, the mine was worked by locals on a small scale, during and after the First World War, but eventually it filled with groundwater and became inaccessible.

Exploration and development at the old mine recommenced around 1949. The first lead concentrates were shipped in December 1955. The Conrad mine was impacted by a fall in metal prices in 1957, poor ore grades, and high production costs. Mining ceased on 27 December 1957. Its plant was dismantled during 1958–1959, but some remnants were left at the site, such as the headframe.

The mine was well known as a source of rare mineral specimens. The area remains of interest for mineral exploration.

=== Mining village ===
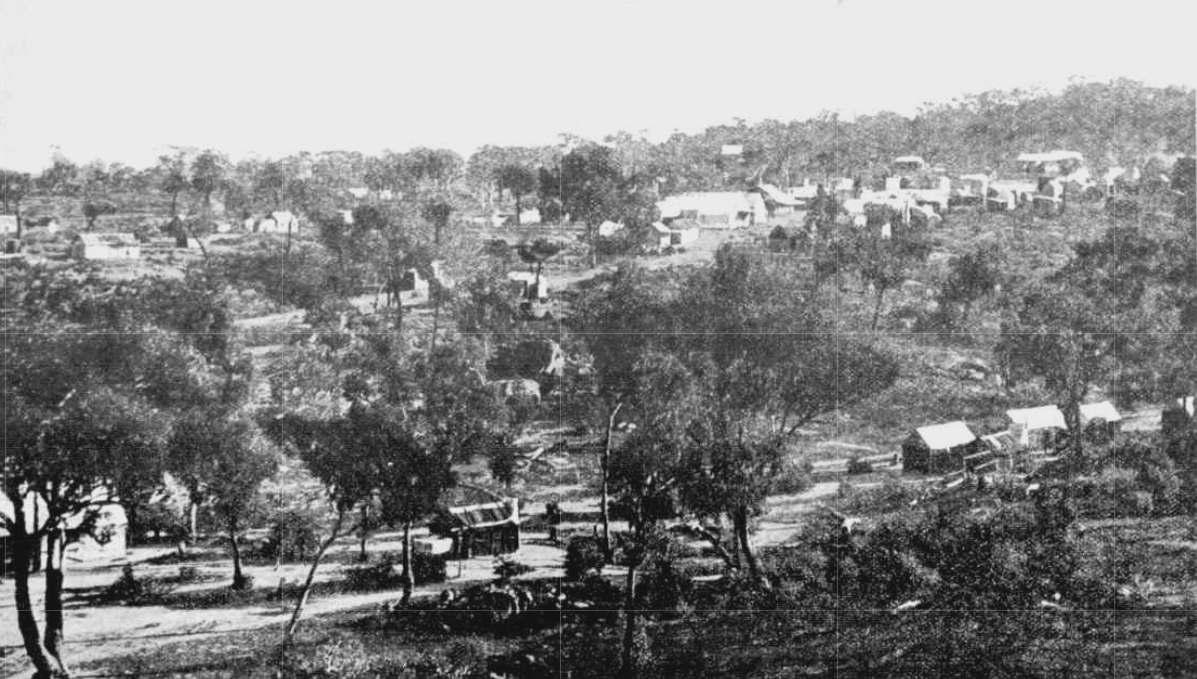
The village, then known as Bora Creek, in April 1901, around the time when it was proclaimed and named Howell.

==== Foundation and population growth ====
The village of Howell was proclaimed in April 1901, although the mining settlement, using the name Bora Creek, already existed by then. It dated from around the time that mining work commenced in 1898, and, by 1901, already had 176 dwellings and a population of 570.

In August, 1903, the population of the village was reported to be around 800. By late 1903, there was also a separate 'calico town' of tents, at the diamond mining area near the headwaters of Bora Creek. By 1912, the population was around 1,000.

==== Heyday ====
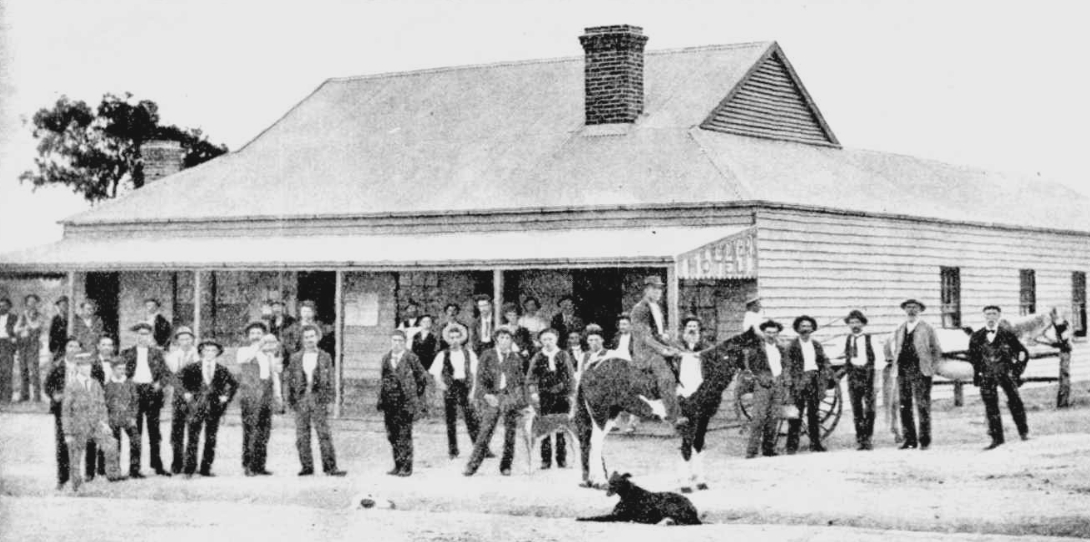
Goodyer's 'Bora Creek Hotel', the smaller of Howell's two hotels (1901)

Although most of its miners' dwellings were made from impermanent makeshift materials, such as timber slabs, bark, corrugated iron, and white-washed hessian fabric, the village's other buildings gave it an appearance of permanence.

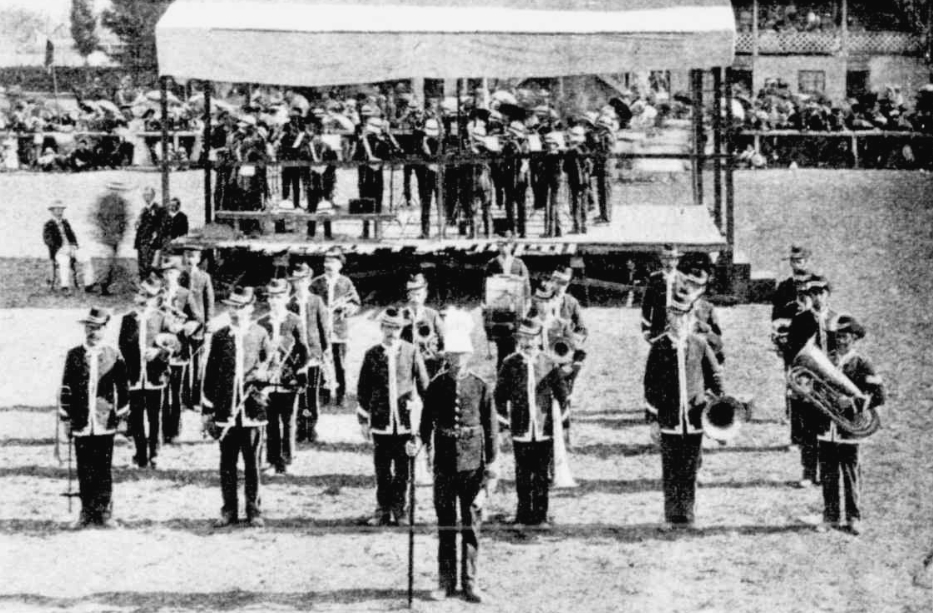
Howell's brass band at Inverell (1907)

Conrad Street, the 100 foot wide, partially cobbled main street of the village was the beginning of a road that led to the Conrad mine, which lay beside Bora Creek. In the other direction, Conrad Street became the road to Inverell, and branching from it was another road to Inverell, which is now blocked by the waters of Lake Copeton.

At opposite ends of the long main street, stood the village's two hotels; Goodyer's 'Bora Creek Hotel' and what was known as 'the top hotel'—officially the Conrad Hotel—a two storied brick structure, including a billiard hall, barber's shop, and 23 bedrooms. There was a large public hall for dancing and other events, and a school of arts building with a library. The village had three stores, two bakers, two butchers, boxing hall and gym, newsagent, and blacksmith. In 1911, the village had a doctor.

Allwell Street was the beginning of the road to the King Conrad mine, which was to the north-west of the Conrad mine and slightly downstream on Bora Creek. Church Street was the site of the village's three churches; a Church of England, Wesleyan (Methodist) Church, and Catholic Church. Near where Church Street joined Conrad Street, stood the public school, which opened in March 1900. Until July 1901, the school was called Conrad, then became known as Howell. The school already had 147 children attending in 1901, and a new school building was erected in 1902.

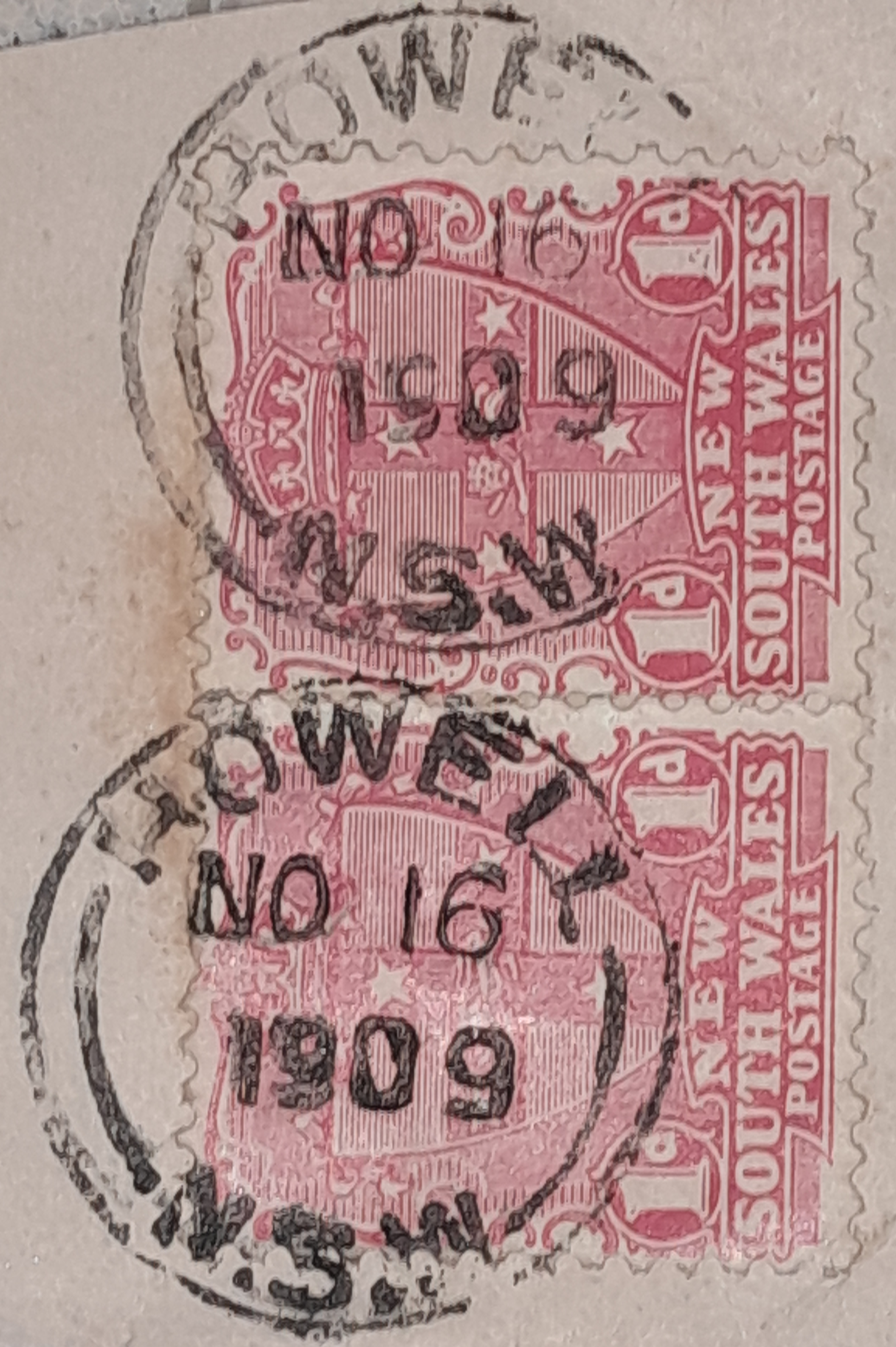
Postmark

In 1901, a brick police station, lock up, and residence were built in Argent Street, followed by a courthouse in 1902. The post office, which had been known as Bora Creek, also became called Howell, in July 1901.

The village had a sportsground—used for cricket, football, and athletic competitions—and a jockey club that hosted regular race meetings, at the village's racecourse. The village had a brass band that participated in 'B-grade' competitions. It even had a short-lived newspaper, The Bora Creek Digger. The paper had relocated from nearby Boggy Camp, where it had been known, during 1899, as the Boggy Camp Tingha and Bora Creek miner. Published every second day, in 1900–1901, the newspaper apparently even survived for a while after its proprietor received a six-year prison sentence for "forging and uttering", while awaiting yet another trial for perjury.

==== Decline and disappearance ====
The loss of 250 jobs, when the Conrad mine closed in March 1913, had immediate consequences for the mining village of Howell. Soon after the mine closed, a work gang of ethnic-Chinese demolished or relocated many of the village's houses and shops, selling them for reuse in nearby towns. Equipment and buildings of the mine were sold by an auction, over two days in June 1914. The items sold included the mine manager's house, built by the last manager of the mine, which sold for £40, a fraction of its original cost. Other buildings fell to ruin.

The declining village sent men to the First World War. The roll of honour from Howell's public school lists 54 names, nine of whom died. Although the school remained open, a classroom was removed and re-erected at Tingha, during 1918.

The licensee of the Bora Creek Hotel applied for a licence renewal in January 1918, but was only granted a final one year's renewal, to allow the sale of the licence and its transfer elsewhere. The licensing inspector had objected to the renewal, because the building was old and dilapidated, and he stated that the police had not insisted on repairs only because they knew that the business could not bear the cost. Howell was described as "practically deserted". In early February 1919, the hotel's furniture, stove, baths and cooking utensils were put to an auction sale.

Over its life, the village suffered greatly from fires. In March 1904, the Catholic church burned down, under suspicious circumstances. In December 1904, the assay office at the Conrad mine burned down. In February 1908, a fire destroyed one of the village's stores and its stock, all insured. However, the worst ones occurred during the years of the village's decline; a series of unexplained fires, starting in the early hours of the morning, which seem to have destroyed buildings that were insured but were never rebuilt.

In the early hours of the morning of 27 January 1915, a fire of unknown origin destroyed the village's post office, courthouse, and Holsted's general store. The village's Court of Petty Sessions and Warden's Court had been abolished only a month earlier. On 30 January 1915, only a few days after the earlier fire, a vacant house was destroyed in a fire, once again in the early hours of the morning and without apparent cause. In June 1929, the Conrad Hotel, the last hotel in the village, was delicensed; its fully furnished, two-storey building—the most substantial building in Howell—was destroyed by fire, during the early hours of 27 January 1930, almost to the hour, fifteen years after the large 1915 fire. It was insured.

Despite protests, the police station closed in November 1934 and, in the following year, the building was demolished and relocated to Inverell.

The public school closed in October 1942, when the population of the surrounding area was 40 to 50. The village's literary institute building replaced the school, as the polling place for the 1944 shire elections, and was still a polling place for the 1954 Australian federal election. The post office seems to have remained open, and it was operating in 1947. In 1948, the Methodist church building was put up for sale by tender, separately to its land, and faced demolition and removal.

Howell was described in November 1948 as, "A mere handful of buildings, now reaching the ramshackle derelict state, are all that remains of a lively community." Also in 1948, a judge observed that Howell's cemetery had not been used for many years and had a growth of "green timber". Although the cemetery had some use, even in the heyday of the village and more so thereafter, the remains of many Howell residents were interred at the cemetery at Inverell—possibly at least in part because of its proximity to the nearest hospital.

There was a small revival of the village, after development work commenced on the Conrad mine during 1949, although most of the workers resided at Tingha. In November 1951, the village escaped destruction by a bushfire. Howell still had its post office, in mid 1952 and its school of arts building, in mid 1954. The closure of the Conrad mine in 1957, resulted in the abandonment of the village and the removal of twelve workers' cottages that had been erected there around 1949.

==== Remnants ====
There is little left to show that the village ever existed. There is a dam on Borah Creek, near to the village site, in what was once known as Snake Gully. A road, still known as Conrad Street where it passes through what was once the village of Howell, leads to the abandoned site of the Conrad mine. Some vehicle tracks in the area follow the routes of former streets of the village, including Sharpe, Argent, and Allwell Streets.

Howell Road, was once a route to Inverell, but it now ends abruptly at the shore of Lake Copeton; a now inundated section of the road's route runs through the submerged site of a village, Copeton, originally called Boggy Camp, which once stood on the left bank of Copes Creek, where diamonds were mined. Before it flows into the lake, Copes Creek forms the northern boundary of the modern-day locality of Howell.

Howell has a cemetery, which is located to the east of the former village's site. There are at least three headstones there, being those of; Joseph Dillion, a miner who was accidentally killed in the Conrad mine, in 1910; Mary Ann Clarke, a 42-year-old woman, who died at Howell, in 1902, after giving birth to a daughter and receiving what was found to have been inadequate medical care; and Joseph Gribble, a 92-year-old man who died at Howell in 1911. It is known that other burials occurred there, from at latest April 1902 to at least as late as April 1933. One of those interred there was Peter Allwell, who in 1895 found the ore deposit that became the King Conrad mine. The public road to the cemetery was proposed to be closed, in 1970, but its former route is still partially discernible in aerial views. Access to the cemetery now requires crossing privately owned land.

The Howell public school's First World War roll of honour is now at the Sports and Recreation Club in nearby Tingha. The court records of Howell were not lost in the courthouse fire of 1915, and are kept in the State Archives of New South Wales.

== Contamination and environmental impact ==
A legacy of mining is the contaminated Conrad mine site, and consequent contamination of Borah Creek, downstream of the Conrad mine site, and Maid's Creek, downstream of its confluence with Borah Creek. That contamination is exacerbated by the presence of insoluble arsenic compounds, as well as the metallic and acid contamination that can be expected from a base metal mine site.

In October 1913, soon after the Conrad mine closed, a resident of Copeton noted that pollution from the mine site was affecting the water quality in the Gwydir River, killing fish in the river for five miles below the confluence of Maids Creek. It had been identified, as early as 1922, that water from the Conrad mine contained dangerous levels of arsenic and needed careful handling. Significant environmental impacts from the site were identified during the 1970s.

Despite remediation work and capping of tailings dumps being carried out, the creek water and sediments were highly contaminated, in 2017—exceeding guidelines, both onsite and downstream of the mine—by contaminants carried in mine water flow and leachate from tailings dumps. Both creeks are part of the catchment of Copeton Dam, but fortunately there is little effect on the dam's water quality. The mine site is managed under the Legacy Mines program of NSW Resources. Off-site environmental impacts make the site one of the highest-risk sites in the Derelict Mines Program database.
