= List of acts of the Parliament of Victoria from 1961 =

This is a list of acts of the Parliament of Victoria, Australia for the year 1961.

== 1961 ==
Short title, or popular name	Citation	Royal assent
Long title
Employers and Employés (Attachment of Wages) Act 1961 or the Employers and Employees (Attachment of Wages) Act 1961	No. 6740	11 April 1961
An Act to amend Section Sixty-one of the Employers and Employés Act 1958. (Note: Employers and Employés Act 1958 (No. 6242))
Ripon Peace Memorial Hospital Trust Act 1961	No. 6747	18 April 1961
An Act to vary the Objects of a Certain Trust relating to a Fund raised to establish a Hospital at Beaufort.
Janet Clarke Hall Act 1961	No. 6752	18 April 1961
An Act to make Provision with respect to the Incorporation of Janet Clarke Hall and the Transfer thereto of Certain Property and Funds, and for other purposes.
Statute Law Revision Act 1961	No. 6759	26 April 1961
An Act to revise the Statute Law.
Constitution Act Amendment (Electoral) Act 1961	No. 6764	26 April 1961
An Act to amend Part V. of The Constitution Act Amendment Act 1958, (Note: Constitution Act Amendment Act 1958 (No. 6224)) to repeal Division One of Part VI. of that Act, and for other purposes.
	No. 6772	26 April 1961
An Act to apply out of the Consolidated Revenue the sum of Eleven million two hundred and thirty-seven thousand eight hundred and twenty pounds to the service of the year One thousand nine hundred and sixty-one and One thousand nine hundred and sixty-two
	No. 6773	26 April 1961
An Act to apply out of the Consolidated Revenue the sum of Four hundred and fifty-three thousand four hundred and twenty-seven pounds to the service of the year One thousand nine hundred and sixty and One thousand nine hundred and sixty-one.
	No. 6774	2 August 1961
An Act to apply out of the Consolidated Revenue the sum of Thirty-four million seven hundred and sixty-one thousand three hundred and thirty pounds to the service of the year One thousand nine hundred and sixty-one and One thousand nine hundred and sixty-two.
Game (Black Swans) Act 1961	No. 6775	11 October 1961
An Act to amend Section Thirty-five of the Game Act 1958. (Note: Game Act 1958 (No. 6258))
	No. 6784	25 October 1961
An Act to apply out of the Consolidated Revenue the sum of Twenty-four million four hundred and thirty-six thousand nine hundred and sixty pounds to the service of the year One thousand nine hundred and sixty-one and One thousand nine hundred and sixty-two.
Agricultural Colleges (Leases) Act 1961	No. 6786	31 October 1961
An Act to amend the Agricultural Colleges Act 1958. (Note: Agricultural Colleges Act 1958 (No. 6194))
United Lutheran Church Incorporation Act 1961	No. 6787	31 October 1961
An Act to Incorporate the United Evangelical Lutheran Church in Australia Victoria District.
North Geelong to Fyansford Railway Deviation Act 1961 (repealed)	No. 6792	31 October 1961
An Act to authorize the Construction of a Deviation on the North Geelong to Fyansford Railway. (Repealed by Transport Act 1983 (No. 9921))
Apprenticeship (Amendment) Act 1961	No. 6793	8 November 1961
An act to amend the Apprenticeship Act 1958. (Note: Apprenticeship Act 1958 (No. 6199))
Forests (Wood Pulp Agreement) Act 1961	No. 6796	28 November 1961
An Act to ratify validate approve and otherwise give effect to an Agreement between the Minister of Forests, the Forests Commission and Australian Paper Manufacturers Limited with respect to Supplies of Pulpwood from State Forests for the Purposes of the Industry of Manufacturing Wood Pulp.
R.S.L. Welfare Trust Fund Act 1961	No. 6799	28 November 1961
An Act to authorize the Variation of the Trust upon which certain Funds are held for the Members for the time being of the Victorian Branch of The Returned Sailors', Soldiers' and Airmen's Imperial League of Australia and for other purposes.
Zinc Corporation, Limited Act 1961	No. 6800	28 November 1961
An Act to authorize The Zinc Corporation, Limited to become a Company deemed to be incorporated in Victoria, to preserve the Identity of the Company so incorporated with The Zinc Corporation, Limited an existing Company within the meaning of the Companies Act 1948 (Note: Companies Act 1948 (11 & 12 Geo. 6. c. 38 (UK))) of the United Kingdom, and for other purposes.
University (Officers) Act 1961	No. 6802	5 December 1961
An Act to amend the University Act 1958 (Note: University Act 1958 (No. 6405)) in relation to the Appointment of Pro-Vice-Chancellors and Deans of Faculties.
	No. 6807	5 December 1961
An Act to apply out of the Consolidated Revenue the sum of Four million four hundred and sixteen thousand five hundred and ninety-five pounds to the service of the year One thousand nine hundred and sixty and One thousand nine hundred and sixty-one.
Disposal of Uncollected Goods Act 1961	No. 6815	12 December 1961
An Act to authorize the Disposal of Goods accepted in the Course of a Business for Repair or other Treatment but not redelivered and for Purposes connected therewith,
Water Supply Loan Application Act 1961 (repealed)	No. 6820	12 December 1961
An Act to sanction the Issue and Application of Loan Money for Works and other Purposes relating to Irrigation Water Supply Drainage Sewerage Flood Protection and River Improvement, and for other purposes. (Repealed by Treasury Legislation (Repeal) Act 2005 (No. 73 of 2005))
Co-operation (Amendment) Act 1961	No. 6824	12 December 1961
An Act to amend Sections Thirty and Sixty-one of the Co-operation Act 1958. (Note: Co-operation Act 1958 (No. 6225))
Motor Boating Act 1961	No. 6832	12 December 1961
An Act to make Provision for the Registration of Motor Boats and for the Control of Boating on Victorian Waters and for other purposes.
Companies Act 1961	No. 6839	19 December 1961
An Act to consolidate and amend the Law relating to Companies.
Constitution Act Amendment Act 1961	No. 6840	19 December 1961
An Act to amend The Constitution Act (Note: Constitution Act 1855 (19 Vict.)) and The Constitution Act Amendment Act 1958, and for other purposes.
Rural Finance and Settlement Commission Act 1961 (repealed)	No. 6846	19 December 1961
An Act to constitute a Rural Finance and Settlement Commission and to transfer thereto the Powers Functions Duties and Obligations of the Soldier Settlement Commission and the Rural Finance Corporation, and for purposes connected therewith. (Repealed by Rural Finance Act 1988 (No. 44 of 1988))
Town and Country Planning Act 1961 or the Town and Country Planning (Miscellaneous Provisions) Act 1961 (repealed)	No. 6849	19 December 1961
An Act to consolidate and amend the Law relating to Town and Country Planning. (Repealed by Prostitution Control Act 1994 (No. 102 of 1994))
	No. 6850	19 December 1961
An Act to apply a sum out of the Consolidated Revenue to the service of the year ending on the thirtieth day of June One thousand nine hundred and sixty-two and to appropriate the Supplies granted in this and the last preceding Session of Parliament.
Bread Industry (Legal Proceedings) Act 1961	No.	
Building Societies (Amendment) Act 1961	No.	
Cancer (Amendment) Act 1961	No.	
Children's Welfare (Appeals) Act 1961	No.	
Church of England (Greensborough Land) Act 1961	No.	
Civil Aviation (Carriers' Liability) Act 1961	No.	
Clean Air (Sub-committees) Act 1961	No.	
Co-operative Housing Societies (Amendment) Act 1961	No.	
Commercial Goods Vehicles (Tow Trucks) Act 1961	No.	
Crimes (Breath Test Evidence) Act 1961	No.	
Crown Leases Act 1961	No.	
Dandenong Lands Act 1961	No.	
Distribution of Population (Joint Committee) Act 1961	No.	
Dog Act 1961	No.	
Education (Amendment) Act 1961	No.	
Entertainments Tax (Amendment) Act 1961	No.	
Evidence (Children) Act 1961	No.	
Exhibition (Borrowing Powers) Act 1961	No.	
Fisheries (Commercial Council) Act 1961	No.	
Game (Amendment) Act 1961	No.	
Gas and Fuel Corporation (Borrowing) Act 1961	No.	
Grain Elevators (Borrowing) Act 1961	No.	
Health (Dangerous Substances) Act 1961	No.	
Health (Proprietary Medicines) Act 1961	No.	
Heidelberg and Toolamba Lands Exchange Act 1961	No.	
Home Finance (Amendment) Act 1961	No.	
Housing (Amendment) Act 1961	No.	
Housing (Commonwealth and State Agreement) Act 1961	No.	
Housing (Home Builders' Account) Act 1961	No.	
Juries (Amendment) Act 1961	No.	
Juries (Fees) Act 1961	No.	
Labour and Industry (Women's Hairdressing) Act 1961	No.	
Land (North-West Mallee Settlement Areas) Act 1961	No.	
Land (Unused Roads and Water Frontages) Act 1961	No.	
Land Tax (Exemptions and Rates) Act 1961	No.	
Landlord and Tenant (Amendment) Act 1961	No.	
Legal Aid Act 1961	No.	
Legal Profession Practice (Amendment) Act 1961	No.	
Legal Profession Practice (Further Amendment) Act 1961	No.	
Limitation of Actions (Recovery of Imposts) Act 1961	No.	
Local Authorities Superannuation (Amendment) Act 1961	No.	
Local Government (Municipal Assistance Fund) Act 1961	No.	
Local Government (Streets and Abattoirs) Act 1961	No.	
Marine (Amendment) Act 1961	No.	
Medical (Amendment) Act 1961	No.	
Melbourne and Metropolitan Board of Works (Yarra River) Act 1961	No.	
Milk and Dairy Supervision (Amendment) Act 1961	No.	
Milk Pasteurization (Licences) Act 1961	No.	
Mines (Aluminium Agreement) Act 1961	No.	
Mines (Explosives) Act 1961	No.	
Money Lenders (Amendment) Act 1961	No.	
Motor Car (Amendment) Act 1961	No.	
Motor Car (Insurance Surcharge) Act 1961	No.	
Municipal Association (Amendment) Act 1961	No.	
Pawnbrokers (Amendment) Act 1961	No.	
Police Offences (False Reports to Police) Act 1961	No.	
Police Offences (Pinball Machines) Act 1961	No.	
Police Regulation (Amendment) Act 1961	No.	
Portland Harbor Trust (Quarrying) Act 1961	No.	
Property Law (Loans to Minors) Act 1961	No.	
Prostitution Act 1961	No.	
Public Works Committee (Special Exemption) Act 1961	No.	
Public Works Interim Loan Application Act 1961	No.	
Public Works Loan Application Act 1961	No.	
Racing (Bookmakers' Course Agents) Act 1961	No.	
Racing (Off-course Doubles Totalizators) Act 1961	No.	
Railway Loan Application Act 1961	No.	
Railways (Funds) Act 1961	No.	
Railways (Permanent Service) Act 1961	No.	
Road Traffic (Parking on Railway and Municipal Property) Act 1961	No.	
Sheep Owners Protection Act 1961	No.	
St. Kilda (Goldsmith and Shelley Streets) Land Act 1961	No.	
Stamps (Amendment) Act 1961	No.	
Stamps (Further Amendment) Act 1961	No.	
State Accident Insurance Office Act 1961	No.	
State Forests Loan Application Act 1961	No.	
Superannuation (Railway Service) Act 1961	No.	
Tourist (Amendment) Act 1961	No.	
Town and Country Planning (Amendment) Act 1961	No.	
Transport Regulation (Compensation) Act 1961	No.	
Transport Regulation (Term of Office) Act 1961	No.	
Valuation of Land (Amendment) Act 1961	No.	
Water (Ballarat Water Commissioners) Act 1961	No.	
Water and Sewerage Authorities (Proceedings and Finances) Act 1961	No.	
West Melbourne Market Land (Amendment) Act 1961	No.	
Wormbete Land Act 1961	No.	

== Sources ==
- "1961 Victorian Historical Acts". AustLII.
