= List of acts of the Parliament of Victoria from 1962 =

This is a list of acts of the Parliament of Victoria, Australia for the year 1962.

== 1962 ==
Short title, or popular name	Citation	Royal assent
Long title
Railways (Thomson River Bridge) Act 1962	No. 6852	3 April 1962
An Act to divest the Railway Bridge over the Thomson River near Walhalla from The Victorian Railways Commissioners and to vest the said Bridge in the President Councillors and Ratepayers of the Shire of Narracan, and for other purposes.
Business Names Act 1962	No. 6853	3 April 1962
An Act to consolidate and amend the Law relating to Business Names and for other purposes.
National Parks Act 1962	No. 6858	11 April 1962
An Act to reserve certain Lands of the Crown as Sites for National Parks and to declare the Lands so reserved to be National Parks under the National Parks Act 1958 (Note: National Parks Act 1958 (No. 6326)) and for other purposes.
	No. 6859	11 April 1962
An Act to apply out of the Consolidated Revenue the sum of Thirty-five million two hundred and seventy-four thousand seven hundred and ninety pounds to the service of the year One thousand nine hundred and sixty-two and One thousand nine hundred and sixty-three.
Standard Insurance Company Limited Act 1962	No. 6862	16 April 1962
An Act relating to Claims against and Liabilities incurred by the Standard Insurance Company Limited in respect of Contracts of Insurance under Division One of Part V. of the Motor Car Act 1958 (Note: Motor Car Act 1958 (No. 6325)) and in relation to Policies of Accident Insurance or Indemnity against Awards of Compensation under the Workers Compensation Act 1958, (Note: Workers Compensation Act 1958 (No. 6419)) and for other purposes.
Administration and Probate (Amendment) Act 1962	No. 6866	16 April 1962
An Act to re-enact with Amendments Section Eighty-six of the Administration and Probate Act 1958. (Note: Administration and Probate Act 1958 (No. 6191))
Statute Law Revision Act 1962	No. 6867	16 April 1962
An Act to revise the Statute Law.
Tottenham to Brooklyn Railway Construction Act 1962 (repealed)	No. 6868	2 May 1962
An Act to authorize the Construction of a Line of Railway from Tottenham to Brooklyn. (Repealed by Transport Act 1983 (No. 9921))
Constitution Act Amendment (Postal Voting) Act 1962	No. 6875	2 May 1962
An Act to amend Division Fifteen of Part V. of, and the Thirteenth and Fourteenth Schedules to, The Constitution Act Amendment Act 1958. (Note: Constitution Act Amendment Act 1958 (No. 6224))
Stock (Artificial Breeding) Act 1962 (repealed)	No. 6877	2 May 1962
An Act to provide for the Control and Regulation of the Artificial Breeding of Stock. (Repealed by Livestock Disease Control Act 1994 (No. 115 of 1994))
Unclaimed Moneys Act 1962	No. 6879	2 May 1962
An Act to consolidate and amend the Law providing for the Payment of Unclaimed Moneys into the Consolidated Revenue and to the Receiver of Revenue in Melbourne.
	No. 6882	2 May 1962
An Act to apply out of the Consolidated Revenue the sum of One hundred and twenty-six thousand nine hundred and fifty-four pounds to the service of the year One thousand nine hundred and sixty-one and One thousand nine hundred and sixty-two.
Subordinate Legislation Act 1962	No. 6886	8 May 1962
An Act relating to Subordinate Legislation and for other purposes.
Probate Duty Act 1962	No. 6890	15 May 1962
An Act to consolidate and amend the Law relating to Probate Duty, and for other purposes.
	No. 6892	1 October 1962
An Act to apply out of the Consolidated Revenue the sum of Twenty-three million nine hundred and sixty-one thousand two hundred and fifty-five pounds to the service of the year One thousand nine hundred and sixty-two and One thousand nine hundred and sixty-three.
Agricultural Colleges (Financial) Act 1962	No. 6896	19 October 1962
An Act to amend Section Nine of the Agricultural Colleges Act 1958 (Note: Agricultural Colleges Act 1958 (No. 6194)) and for other purposes.
Railways (Yallourn Tracks) Act 1962 (repealed)	No. 6899	30 October 1962
An Act to authorize The Victorian Railways Commissioners to operate Train Services upon certain Railway Tracks constructed on Land belonging to the State Electricity Commission of Victoria at Yallourn, and for other purposes. (Repealed by Transport Act 1983 (No. 9921))
Adult Education Act 1962	No. 6904	7 November 1962
An Act to amend Section Sixty-six of the Education Act 1958. (Note: Education Act 1958 (No. 6240))
Agricultural Education (Continuation) Act 1962	No. 6914	20 November 1962
An Act relating to Agricultural Education.
Foreign Judgments Act 1962	No. 6916	20 November 1962
An Act to make Provision for the Enforcement in Victoria of Judgments given in the United Kingdom or in other Countries (whether Commonwealth Countries or not) which accord Reciprocal Treatment to Judgments given in Victoria, for Facilitating the Enforcement in other Countries of Judgments given in Victoria, and for other purposes.
Administration and Probate (Family Provision) Act 1962	No. 6920	20 November 1962
An Act to amend the Administration and Probate Act 1958 (Note: Administration and Probate Act 1958 (No. 6191)) to enable proper Provision to be made out of the Estate of a Person dying intestate for the Maintenance and Support of his Dependants and for other Purposes.
Returned Servicemen's Badges Act 1962	No. 6921	20 November 1962
An Act to amend the Returned Servicemen's Badges Act 1956, (Note: Returned Servicemen's Badges Act 1956 (No. 5948)) and for other purposes.
Home Finance Act 1962	No. 6933	27 November 1962
An Act to re-enact with amendments the Law relating to the Provision of Moneys and to the Execution of Guarantees by the Treasurer of Victoria to encourage the Building and Purchase of Dwelling-houses.
Water Supply Loan Application Act 1962 (repealed)	No. 6934	27 November 1962
An Act to sanction the Issue and Application of Loan Money for Works and other Purposes relating to Irrigation Water Supply Drainage Sewerage Flood Protection and River Improvement, and for other purposes. (Repealed by Treasury Legislation (Repeal) Act 2005 (No. 73 of 2005))
	No. 6936	27 November 1962
An Act to apply out of the Consolidated Revenue the sum of Thirteen million eight hundred and ninety-nine thousand one hundred and seventy-five pounds to the service of the year One thousand nine hundred and sixty-two and One thousand nine hundred and sixty-three.
	No. 6948	4 December 1962
An Act to apply out of the Consolidated Revenue the sum of Three million and twenty-two thousand three hundred and sixty-three pounds to the service of the year One thousand nine hundred and sixty-one and One thousand nine hundred and sixty-two.
Queen's College Land Act 1962	No. 6949	11 December 1962
An Act to authorize the Registered Proprietors of the Land occupied by Queen's College to transfer Portion thereof by way of Gift to Trustees for St. Hilda's College a College affiliated to the University of Melbourne, and for other purposes.
Glenaladale National Park Act 1962	No. 6952	11 December 1962
An Act relating to the Establishment of a National Park in the Parish of Glenaladale and for other purposes.
Young Women's Christian Association of Australia Incorporation Act 1962	No. 6953	11 December 1962
An Act to incorporate the National Board of the Young Women's Christian Association of Australia, to provide for the Vesting in that Body of certain Property, and for other purposes.
Country Fire Authority (Amendment) Act 1962	No. 6956	18 December 1962
An Act to amend the Country Fire Authority Act 1958, (Note: Country Fire Authority Act 1958 (No. 6228)) and for other purposes.
Constitution Act Amendment (Statute Law Revision Committee) Act 1962	No. 6960	18 December 1962
An Act to amend Division Five of Part VI. of The Constitution Act Amendment Act 1958.
Statute Law (Further Revision) Act 1962	No. 6961	18 December 1962
An Act to revise the Statute Law.
Parliamentary Contributory Superannuation Act 1962	No. 6968	18 December 1962
An Act to establish a Parliamentary Contributory Superannuation Fund and for other purposes.
Zinc Corporation, Limited (Amendment) Act 1962	No. 6969	18 December 1962
An Act to amend The Zinc Corporation, Limited Act 1961. (Note: Zinc Corporation, Limited Act 1961 (No. 6800))
Adoption of Children (Property) Act 1962	No. 6971	18 December 1962
An Act to amend Section Eight of the Adoption of Children Act 1958 (Note: Adoption of Children Act 1958 (No. 6192)) as to the effect of the making of Adoption Orders upon the devolution of Property.
Building Contracts (Deposits) Act 1962	No. 6973	18 December 1962
An Act for the Regulation of certain Building Contracts and for incidental purposes.
Sale of Land Act 1962	No. 6975	18 December 1962
An Act to make Provision with respect to the Sale of Land, to amend the Local Government Act 1958, (Note: Local Government Act 1958 (No. 6299)) the Transfer of Land Act 1958, (Note: Transfer of Land Act 1958 (No. 6399)) the Town and Country Planning Act 1961, (Note: Town and Country Planning Act 1961 (No. 6849)) and for other purposes.
	No. 6977	18 December 1962
An Act to apply a sum out of the Consolidated Revenue to the service of the year ending on the thirtieth day of June One thousand nine hundred and sixty-three and to appropriate the Supplies granted in this and the last preceding Session of Parliament.
Bairnsdale (Unimproved Rating Poll) Act 1962	No.	
Bank Holidays (Saturday) Act 1962	No.	
Barley Marketing (Amendment) Act 1962	No.	
Beaufort Lands Act 1962	No.	
Boilers Inspection (Amendment) Act 1962	No.	
Brighton (Cramer-street) Land Act 1962	No.	
Cancer (Facilities) Act 1962	No.	
Children's Welfare (Assistance) Act 1962	No.	
Children's Welfare (Reception Centres) Act 1962	No.	
Co-operative Housing Societies Act 1962	No.	
Coroners (Medical Expenses) Act 1962	No.	
Country Roads (Amendment) Act 1962	No.	
County Court (Amendment) Act 1962	No.	
County Court (Judges) Act 1962	No.	
Crimes (Detention) Act 1962	No.	
Dog (Registration Discs) Act 1962	No.	
Dried Fruits (Expenses and Finances) Act 1962	No.	
Education (School Committees) Act 1962	No.	
Entertainments Tax (Partial Abolition) Act 1962	No.	
Evidence (Amendment) Act 1962	No.	
Fisheries (Noxious Fish) Act 1962	No.	
Forests (Amendment) Act 1962	No.	
Forests (Further Amendment) Act 1962	No.	
Friendly Societies (Amendment) Act 1962	No.	
Fruit and Vegetables (Amendment) Act 1962	No.	
Game (Black Swans) Amendment Act 1962	No.	
Geelong Waterworks and Sewerage (Amendment) Act 1962	No.	
Grain Elevators (Borrowing Powers) Act 1962	No.	
Health (Amendment) Act 1962	No.	
Health (Sampling of Foods) Act 1962	No.	
Housing (Home Builders' Account) Act 1962	No.	
Housing Advances and Loans (Improper Commissions) Act 1962	No.	
Housing Advances and Loans (Procuration Fees) Act 1962	No.	
Judges' Pensions Act 1962	No.	
Justices (Amendment) Act 1962	No.	
Kerang (Alexandra Park) Land Act 1962	No.	
Kew and Heidelberg Lands (Amendment) Act 1962	No.	
Land (Industrial Grants) Act 1962	No.	
Land (Special Grants) Act 1962	No.	
Land Tax (Exemptions and Rates) Act 1962	No.	
Licensing (Temporary Restaurant Licences) Act 1962	No.	
Local Authorities Superannuation (Equipment and Services) Act 1962	No.	
Local Government (Amendment) Act 1962	No.	
Local Government (Further Amendment) Act 1962	No.	
Marine (Board Membership) Act 1962	No.	
Marine Stores and Old Metals (Corporations) Act 1962	No.	
Marriage (Property) Act 1962	No.	
Melbourne and Metropolitan Board of Works (Borrowing Powers) Act 1962	No.	
Melbourne and Metropolitan Board of Works (Government Guarantee) Act 1962	No.	
Melbourne Cricket Ground Act 1962	No.	
Melbourne Harbor Trust (Port of Melbourne) Act 1962	No.	
Melbourne Harbor Trust Lands Act 1962	No.	
Mildura Irrigation and Water Trusts (Amendment) Act 1962	No.	
Milk and Dairy Supervision (Amendment) Act 1962	No.	
Milk Board (Amendment) Act 1962	No.	
Poisons Act 1962	No.	
Police Regulation Act 1962	No.	
Portland Harbor Trust (Borrowing Powers) Act 1962	No.	
Probate Duty (Reduction) Act 1962	No.	
Public Works Committee (Special Exemption) Act 1962	No.	
Public Works Loan Application Act 1962	No.	
Racing (Amendment) Act 1962	No.	
Racing (Anzac Day) Act 1962	No.	
Racing (Dog Racing Control Board) Act 1962	No.	
Railway Loan Application Act 1962	No.	
Railways (Industrial Awards) Act 1962	No.	
Registration of Births Deaths and Marriages (Amendment) Act 1962	No.	
Revocation and Excision of Crown Reservations Act 1962	No.	
Road Traffic (Recovery of Penalties) Act 1962	No.	
Road Traffic (Traffic Control Items) Act 1962	No.	
Sale of Human Blood Act 1962	No.	
Second-hand Dealers (Amendment) Act 1962	No.	
Sewerage Districts (Polls) Act 1962	No.	
Shrine of Remembrance Site (Trustees) Act 1962	No.	
Soil Conservation and Land Utilization Act 1962	No.	
Stamps (Amendment) Act 1962	No.	
State Forests Loan Application Act 1962	No.	
Superannuation (Pensions) Act 1962	No.	
Superannuation (Railway Service) Act 1962	No.	
Supreme Court (Interest on Judgments) Act 1962	No.	
Supreme Court (Registrar) Act 1962	No.	
Tattooing Act 1962	No.	
Teaching Service (Residences) Act 1962	No.	
Trustee (Mortgages) Act 1962	No.	
Trustee (Variation of Trusts) Act 1962	No.	
Trustee Companies (Amalgamation) Act 1962	No.	
Weights and Measures (Amendment) Act 1962	No.	

== Sources ==
- "1962 Victorian Historical Acts". AustLII.
