= Broken Hill South =

Defunct Australian mining company

Broken Hill South Limited was an Australian silver, lead and zinc mining company with mines at Broken Hill, New South Wales.

It is not to be confused with Broken Hill South Blocks, which was acquired by Lakeview Consols in 1905 and Zinc Corporation in 1911.

== History ==
In September 1885 a prospectus was issued for the formation of a company called Broken Hill South Silver Mining Company Limited with paid-up capital of £100,000 and rights to purchase Mineral Lease blocks 5, 6, 7, and 8, totalling 149.5 acres (60.5 ha) adjacent BHP's celebrated property, their intention being to exploit them sequentially. (Bartels, Kelly, Johnson, Septimus Stephen MLA, Weston) but was fully subscribed a week earlier.

Broken Hill South Silver Mining Company (No Liability) was registered in 1893.

They had leases on Blocks 7 and 8, a total of 69 acres (28 ha) along the line of lode, adjacent the Zinc Corporation's lease.

The company was liquidated 1918 in order to be re-formed as Broken Hill South Limited. By the end of 1939 over 10 million tons of ore had been extracted, refined and the concentrate sent to Broken Hill Associated Smelters at Port Pirie.

Two significant executives may be mentioned, William Wainwright and Andrew Fairweather, each being mine manager at "The Hill" before becoming General Manager of the company.

The company was part of the informal alliance of three mining companies, with North Broken Hill and Zinc Corporation, that was known as the Collins House Group.

In 1973, the company changed its name to BH South Limited. In 1980, BH South Limited was taken over by Western Mining Corporation (WMC), with CTB Nominees (an affiliate of Commonwealth Bank) holding a 16 per cent stake and small shareholders 4 per cent. WMC then sold some of the BH South assets to CRA, in exchange for CRA shares. The remainder of the company's assets, those not wanted by WMC, were liquidated in 1983.
