= Alexander Anderson Stewart =

Scottish-born Australian engineer, industrialist and company director (1874–1956)

Sir Alexander Anderson Stewart KB
- Born: 31 May 1874; Aberdeen, Scotland
- Died: 6 May 1956 (aged 81); East Melbourne, Victoria, Australia
- Resting place: Brighton General Cemetery, Melbourne
- Occupations: Engineer; industrialist; company director
- Known for: Founding figure of Australia’s industrial gases industry; first chairman of Commonwealth Industrial Gases (CIG)
- Board member of: Commonwealth Industrial Gases (chair); Cuming, Smith & Co.; Commonwealth Fertilisers and Chemicals; Australian Fertilizers; Industrial Chemicals Ltd / ICIANZ; Broken Hill South; Dunlop Australia; Triton Gold Mines; BHAS; Burma Corporation; Metal Manufacturers
- Spouses: Grace Mary Cuming (m. 1900; deceased); Sybil Mary Vera Nunn (m. 1935)
- Awards: Knight Bachelor (1937)

Sir Alexander Anderson Stewart (31 May 1874 – 6 May 1956) was a Scottish-born Australian engineer, industrialist and company director. After emigrating to Victoria in 1898 he rose to prominence in heavy industry, pioneering the commercial production of oxygen and acetylene and becoming the inaugural chairman of Commonwealth Industrial Gases (CIG). A leading Collins House Group director, he held senior roles across fertilisers, chemicals and mining, and was a long-serving office-bearer at The Alfred Hospital, where he was treasurer (1932–42) and president (1942–52). He was knighted in 1937 for services to industry and public life.

== Early life and engineering training ==
Stewart was born at Aberdeen, Scotland, on 31 May 1874, and educated at Robert Gordon's College. He was apprenticed as a mechanical engineer and obtained further practical experience in England before emigrating to Victoria in 1898.

== Engineering and industrial career ==
Settling in Melbourne’s west, Stewart became chief engineer at the Michaelis Hallenstein tannery at Footscray. In 1903 he went into partnership with William Fyvie as Fyvie & Stewart, engineers and contractors, later trading as Alex. Stewart & Co.

Recognising opportunities in industrial gases, Stewart secured German patents and plant designs and, with British Oxygen interests, helped form the Commonwealth Oxygen Company in 1911. In 1935 a reorganisation and merger created Commonwealth Industrial Gases (CIG), of which Stewart was the first chairman. Through these ventures he was central to establishing oxygen and acetylene manufacture for Australian industry and medicine.

== Company directorships and Collins House ==
Following the death of his father-in-law James Cuming (1835–1911), Stewart joined the board of Cuming, Smith & Co. He later held directorships (often chairing committees) with Commonwealth Fertilisers and Chemicals, Australian Fertilizers, Industrial Chemicals Ltd (subsequently ICI in Australasia), Dunlop , and Broken Hill South, among others. He moved within the Collins House Group business network.

== Public service and philanthropy ==
Stewart served on federal wartime industrial and munitions panels during the Second World War. He was treasurer of The Alfred Hospital (1932–42) and president (1942–52), and sat on the Felton Bequest committee. His portrait by Max Meldrum reflects his public prominence.

== Honours ==
Stewart was appointed a Knight Bachelor in 1937 in recognition of his services to industry and public affairs.

== Personal life ==
On 16 February 1900 Stewart married Grace Mary Cuming, daughter of industrialist James Cuming (1835–1911).

== Death ==
Stewart died at East Melbourne on 6 May 1956 and was buried in Brighton General Cemetery, Melbourne.

== Legacy ==
Stewart’s engineering entrepreneurship helped establish the Australian industrial gases sector and consolidated key fertiliser and chemical enterprises. His hospital and philanthropic work, particularly at The Alfred and through the Felton Bequest, were significant 20th Century contributions, and support his standing as a civic leader.
