= Collins House Group =

Former informal company grouping in Melbourne, Victoria, Australia

The Collins House Group was an informal alliance of largely Anglo-Australian companies, which shared an office building, Collins House, at 360-366 Collins Street, Melbourne, from 1911 until 1951. The building gave the group its name. The most significant of these companies were three mining companies, Zinc Corporation, North Broken Hill and Broken Hill South, whose operations began at Broken Hill. The companies had interlocking business relationships and were influential in Australian business and politics during the 20th century. Companies in the group shared a common pool of directors, shared ownership of subsidiaries, and shared relationships with financial backers. According to historian Geoffrey Blainey, Collins House was "the most influential group of financiers in Australia between the wars and that period was its heyday".

== Collins House ==
Collins House. in 1918 (National Library of Australia)

The building that gave its name to the Collins House Group, stood at at 360-366 Collins Street, Melbourne. It was constructed in 1911 and owned, until 1960, by the Baillieu family. It was built by Eggleston & Oakely with consulting design by Walter Burley Griffin. The building had extensive additions in 1914, and it was said that the building "with its extension will have the largest ofllce accommodation of any building in Australia."

The base of the building was of trachyte from Bowral, NSW, the facade of Wangaratta stone, a granite with low mica content, paving of white Sicilian marble, with red marble from Orange, NSW. The building was in three parts; the front made of stone, the middle made of reinforced concrete, and the rear made entirely of brick. All floors were ferro-concrete. The building had a golf practice green on its roof, by late 1916. The building was further extended in 1925.

During the construction of Collins House, John Monash was the Superintending Engineer. His firm, Reinforced Concrete and Monier Pipe Construction Company, took a suite of nine rooms in the new building.

It was demolished in 1974, and replaced with the building that now occupies the site, which was upgraded in 2017. The original Collins House is not to be confused with the modern-day building of the same name, Collins House, at 464-466 Collins Street, Melbourne.

== The companies ==
=== Common factors ===
A number of companies had their Australian headquarters in Collins House. Although many were in similar or related lines of business, in mining, smelting or chemical technology, not all were part of the informal alliance known as the Collins House Group. For example, the Mount Lyell Mining & Railway Company, used the building, but was not part of the Collins House Group.

Another common factor of early Collins House Group of companies was an origin associated with Broken Hill. However, the most prominent of the Broken Hill mining companies, Broken Hill Proprietary (BHP), had its headquarters elsewhere on Collins Street, and was never a member of the group. The only readily apparent linkage between the original companies in the group was that they had directors who were relatives or business associates, and the companies had offices in Collins House.

Some Collins House companies were registered in the United Kingdom, and their boards—representing largely British shareholders—resided and met in London. For such companies, Collins House was an Australian address, and was used as an office for local management, local subsidiaries, and service companies.

=== Emerging grouping - before Collins House building to outbreak of war ===
The name Collins House Group was only ever informal, but the name could not have been applied, before the original building was completed in 1911.

Companies that were considered to be earliest parts of the emerging Collins House Group (CHG) were:

- Zinc Corporation (1905) (*+*) - Floated by founders of the CHG
- North Broken Hill (NBH) (Mine founded in 1895, in CHG after reconstruction of North Broken Hill Mining Co., in 1905)

To which were later added, in the year indicated:

- Amalgamated Zinc (De Bavay's) (AZDB) (1909) - Formed to apply de Bavay's process at Broken Hill
- Australian Smelting Corporation (ASC) (from 1907 to 1909 only) - A unsuccessful company that attempted to build a smelter at Port Kembla
- Y-Water Tin Company (c.1907) - A tin mine at Emmaville, using hydraulic mining
- Hampden Cloncurry Copper Mines Ltd, a copper mine at Kuridala; in GHC from around 1910. The mines closed in 1920.
- Adelong Gold Estates (1912) - A gold dredging company on Adelong Creek at Grahamstown.
- Barrier South Limited (1915) - A company formed by the reconstruction of the British-owned Broken Hill South Extended, in 1913
- Broken Hill Associated Smelters (BHAS) (1915) - formed after CHG companies bought part of BHP's interest
- Broken Hill South Limited (BHS) (Mine founded in 1885, it was holding meetings meeting at Collins House by 1912, but was not fully-controlled by CHG until after reconstruction of Broken Hill South Silver Mining Co., in 1918

In 1913, E.L. Bailieu and Lionel Robinson became directors of Mount Morgan Gold Mining Co (MMGM) after a large share transfer. MMGM was never fully-controlled by CHG, but its subsidiary company Electrolytic Refining & Smelting would eventually become part of CHG.

=== Other CHG companies ===
The name Collins House Group seems have been applied from around 1924, at latest.

Three mining companies were added to the during the 1930s, to what was then already known as the Collins House Group:

- Gold Mines of Australia (GMA) (1930) (+)
- Western Mining Corporation (WMC) (1933)
- New Broken Hill Consolidated Limited (NBHC) (1936) (+*)

There was also a financing vehicle, known as Gold Exploration and Finance Co. of Australia Ltd (GEFCA), established in 1934, which held large shareholdings in WMC and GM, and raised its funding mainly from London-based South African mining interests

Other mining companies, which were CHG subsidiary companies, were:

- Central Norseman Gold Corporation (1935) - WMC subsidiary running development and operation of the Central Norseman gold mine
- Gold Mines of Kalgoorlie (Aust.) Ltd (1934) - It took over a block of leases adjoining the Lake View and Star leases at Kalgoorlie.(+)
- Kalgoorlie Southern Gold Mines NL (1950) - It acquired a lease south of the main Kalgoorlie field.
- Central Victoria Dredging Co. NL (1947) - It bought some assets of Victoria Dredging Co., paying by issuing new shares.
- Shale Oil Investigation Pty. Ltd. (1930) - A company formed to take over the oil shale mine and plant at Newnes; it was short-lived.
- Cobar Mines Proprietary Limited (1957) - An exploration and mine development company working on old leases in the Cobar region of NSW.

Downstream processors that were also considered to be part of the Collins House Group—in some instances jointly-owned by two or more of the other CHG companies, or were partly-owned—were:

- Broken Hill Associated Smelters (BHAS) (1915) - formed after CHG companies bought part of BHP's interest
- Zinc Producers Association Pty Ltd (ZPA) (1916) - A company to handle zinc concentrate (see WW1) for ref.
- Electrolytic Zinc Company of Australasia (EZ) (1916)
- British Australian Lead Manufacturers (1918)
- Barrier Roasters Pty Ltd (1918) - a company that roasted zinc concentrate to produce calcinates to feed the electrolytic process
- Commonwealth Red Lead and Litharge Co. Ltd.,(1927 - 28)- a company that produced red lead pigments and lead oxide for batteries.
- Electrolytic Refining and Smelting Co. (E.R. & S) (Founded in 1907, but part of CHG from 1928, after the liquidation of Mount Morgan mine)
- Imperial Smelting Corporation (ISC) (1929), which took over National Smelting Company, operator of the smelter at Avonmouth, England.
- Austral Bronze (1928)
- Australian Aluminium (1936)
- Broken Hill Corporation, Ltd. (1948) - a subsidiary of NBC and ISC formed to take over Sulphide Corporation, and its Cockle Creek Smelter

Service companies that were considered part of the CHG were:

- E. L. & C. Baillieu (pre-dates CHG) - Melbourne-based stockbrokers , the principals were two brothers of William Baillieu.
- Lionel Robinson, Clark & Co. (pre-dates CHG) - London-based stockbrokers (+)
- Govett, Sons & Co. (pre-dates CHG) - London-based stockbrokers (+)
- Minerals Separation Limited (1903) - Assignee of key 1905 patent for froth flotation, later bought rights to 1912 differential flotation patent(+)
- Minerals Separation and De Bavay's Processes Australia Pty Ltd (1912) - Jointly-owned Australian subsidiary of Minerals Separation and AZ
- Edward H. Shackell & Co., later Secretariat Pty Ltd - Provided services of company secretaries and managers to CHG companies
- Pavey, Wilson & Cohen - Lawyers who acted for CHG companies, with offices in Collins House
- Arthur Robinson & Co. - Lawyers who acted for CHG companies, with offices in Collins House
- Fyvie and Stewart, later Alex Stewart & Co. - Consulting mining engineers, with offices in Collins House.
- Globe Pty Ltd (1919) - a company that bought timber for the mines
- Western New South Wales Electric Power Pty. Ltd (WNSWEP) (1930) - supplier of electricity and compressed air to the mines at Broken Hill

Industrial offshoots of CHG companies were

- Commonwealth Aircraft Corporation (CAC)
- Tasmanian Paper Pty. Ltd. (1926) - a precursor to APPM
- Associated Pulp & Paper Mills (APPM)
- Metal Manufactures (MM) (1928), a manufacturing offshoot of E.R & S.
- Cable Makers Australia (CMA) (1940), an offshoot of MM
- Austral Standard Cables (ASC), an offshoot of MM

Other associated companies were:

- Imperial Chemical Industries of Australia and New Zealand (ICIANZ) - Linked to CHG by Somerset family, and Alexander Anderson Stewart.
- Carlton & United Breweries (CUB) - Linked to CHG via Cohen and Baillieu family connections.
- Myer Emporium - Its founder, Sidney Myer (1878 – 1934) was married to W.L. Baillieu's niece (Myer's second wife).
- The Herald & Weekly Times (HWT) - Linked to CHG via a Baillieu family connection.
- Melbourne Electric Supply Company (MESC) - Linked to CHG via W.L. Baillieu and W.M. Hyndman; taken over by SECV in 1930.
- Dunlop Rubber - Linked to CHG via a Baillieu family connection, and Alexander Anderson Stewart.
- Yarra Falls (textiles) - Linked to CHG via Baillieu, Robinson and Hordern family (Hordern related to Baillieu by marriage).
- Felt and Textiles of Australia, later known as Feltex Carpets - Linked to CHG via Walter Massy-Greene.
- Australian Knitting Mills - Linked to CHG, via G.H. Robinson, its director and later chairman, who was a brother of W.S. Robinson.
- Burmah Mines Ltd (+) - Linked via F.A.Govett, at one point Zinc Corporation owned a third of its shares.

Entities that were not incorporated as companies but in which the Collins House companies participated were:

- Broken Hill Mine Owners' Association
- Broken Hill Mining Managers' Association - Employers counterpart to the Barrier Industrial Council
- Broken Hill Co-operative Coal Association (1923)

(+) Denotes a company registered in the United Kingdom.

(*+*) Denotes a company originally registered in Victoria, which changed its domicile to the United Kingdom and subsequently again to Victoria.

(+*) Denotes a company originally registered in the United Kingdom, which changed its domicile to the Victoria.

== People ==
=== People associated with the companies ===
Some of the people associated with the Collins House Group were connected by a familial relationship, by marriage, or by personal friendship, and others had close business relationships. Individuals with a significant involvement in the Collins House companies were:

- William Lawrence Baillieu (1859 – 1936) - Known as W.L. Baillieu and 'Big Bill', former real estate auctioneer, later investor and financier
- Lionel Robinson (1866 – 1922), Mining stockbroker, and principal of Lionel Robinson, Clark & Co. (*+)
- William Sydney Robinson (1876 – 1963), Known as W.S. Robinson, younger brother of Lionel Robinson, originally a journalist (*+*)
- Francis Algernon Govett (1858 – 1926) - Financier, Govett, Sons & Co. stockbrokers, chairman and managing director of Zinc Corporation (+)
- Herbert Hoover (1874 – 1964) - Later 31st US president, while working with Bewick, Moreing & Co. and up to 1914, he was an associate of W.L. Baillieu, F.A. Govett, Lionel Robinson, and W.S. Robinson
- William Clark (c. 1868 – 1948) - Principal of Lionel Robinson, Clark & Co. (*+)
- Edward Lloyd ('Prince') Baillieu (1867–1939) - Brother of W.L. Baillieu, stockbroker, and director of Minerals Separation and Yarra Falls
- Colin Fraser (1875 – 1944) - New Zealand born mining engineer, involved from 1911. He was the effective head of CHG in the 1930s.
- William Moody Hyndman (1855 – 1926) - Director of NBH, BHS, BALM, ZC, ZPA, and also MESC and CUB
- Wilfred Deakin Brookes (1906 – 1997) - Chemist and manager at APPM, later director of Western Mining Corporation
- Montague Cohen (1855 – 1931) - Lawyer, partner of Pavey, Wilson & Cohen, director of Amalgamated Zinc and later of Electrolytic Zinc
- Harold Edward Cohen (1881 – 1946) - Son of Montague Cohen, and lawyer; he was a director of EZ and chairman of APPM
- Edward Cohen (1912 – 2011) - Son of Harold Cohen, lawyer and director, later chairman of EZ, ER &S, APPM and CUB
- Alexander Anderson Stewart (1874 – 1956) - Consulting mining engineer, and director of CHG companies
- William Alexander Stewart (c.1890 – 1927) - Mining engineer, son of Alexander Stewart, married into Ballieu family, director of CHG companies
- Molesworth Richard Greene (1827–1916) - Grazier, from 1889 a director and later chairman of Broken Hill South
- Robert Horne (1871 – 1940) - British lawyer and politician, later chairman of Zinc Corporation.(+)
- John Romaine Govett (1897 – 1956) - Son of Francis Govett, and chairman of Zinc Corporation after the death of Robert Horne (+)
- John Lynne Wharton ( c.1869 – 1923) - Colleague of W.L. Baillieu, managing director of Amalgamated Zinc, a director Electrolytic Zinc and Mount Morgan G.M, chairman of Met, al Manufactures, Y-Water Tin Co.,Adelong Gold Estates, and Hampden Cloncurry
- Walter Massy-Greene (1872 – 1952) - Politician, also chairman of APPM, and director of many CHG and other companies
- William Alexander Watt (1871 – 1946) - Politician, who later held directorships of GHG companies
- Arthur Robinson (1872 – 1945) - Brother of Lionel and W.S. Robinson, lawyer, state and federal politician, director of BALM and other companies
- Herbert Gepp (1877 – 1954) - Chemist, later general manager of Electrolytic Zinc, then senior public servant, later general manager of APPM.
- Lindesay Clark (1896 – 1986) - Engineer with Gold Mines of Australia, then technical managing director of WMC, and from 1952 its chairman, chairman of BHS also a director of other CHG companies.
- Henry St John Somerset (1875 - 1952) - Metallurgist, manager at BHAS, general manager, later managing director, of EZ and director of BHAS
- Henry Beaufort Somerset (1906 – 1995) - Son of H. StJ. Somerset, managing director of APPM and director of BHAS
- Auguste de Bavay (1856 – 1944) - Brewer and chemist, inventor of de Bavay's flotation process used by Amalgamated Zinc, and director of EZ
- Fleury James (Jim) Lyster (1872 – 1948) - Mill manager who developed a commercially-viable differential flotation process for Zinc Corporation
- Edward Herbert Shackell (1868 – 1932) - W.L. Baillieu's brother-in-law, principal of Edward H. Shackell & Co., and director of CHG companies
- Clive Latham Bailieu (1889 – 1967) - W.L. Baillieu's son, son-in-law of William Clark, director of EZ, chairman of Dunlop, eventually a baronet(*+)
- William Edward Wainwright (1873–1959) - Mine manager, later general manager of BHS. He was succeeded by Andrew Fairweather
- Andrew Fairweather (1882 – 1962) - Director of BHS, EZ, ER & S, and WNSWEP, during the period following Colin Fraser's death
- Hugh Gerner Brain (1890 – 1976) - Acted as company secretary for many CHG companies, later a director of CMA and Austral Bronze, and joint managing director of Metal Manufactures.

Politicians who never held directorships of CHG companies, but who are considered to have been close to people from the Collins House Group and generally shared their political views were:

- Robert Menzies (1894 – 1978) - Member of House of Representatives, Prime Minister of Australia, 1939 – 1941 and 1949 – 1965.

(+) Denotes person who was residing in England.

(*+) Denotes person who had been previously residing in Australia, before relocating to England.

(*+*) Denotes person who had been previously residing in Australia, before relocating to England, but subsequently returned to Australia.

Some people associated with the Collins House Group companies

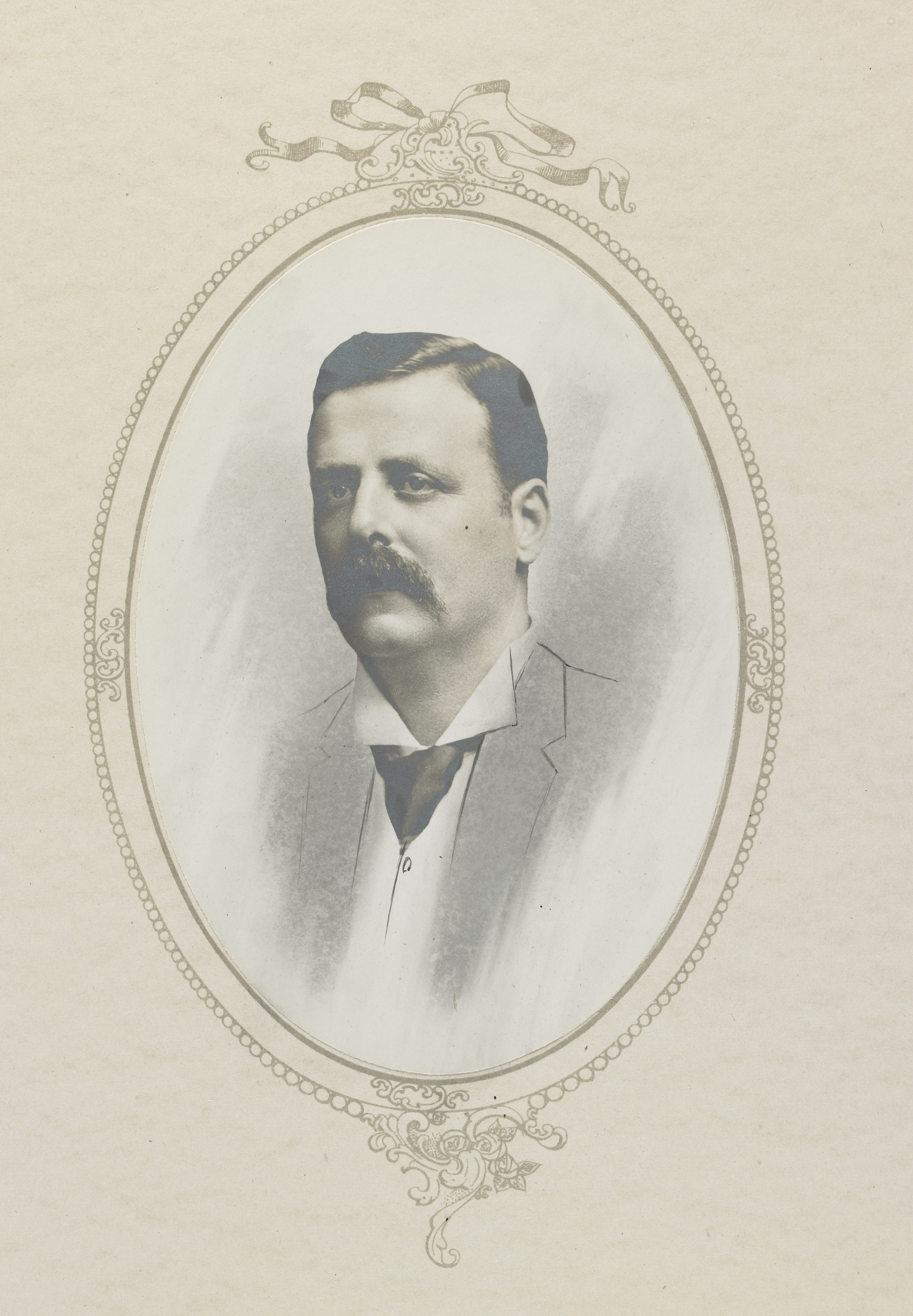
W.L. Baillieu (c.1909)

W.S. Robinson (c.1934)

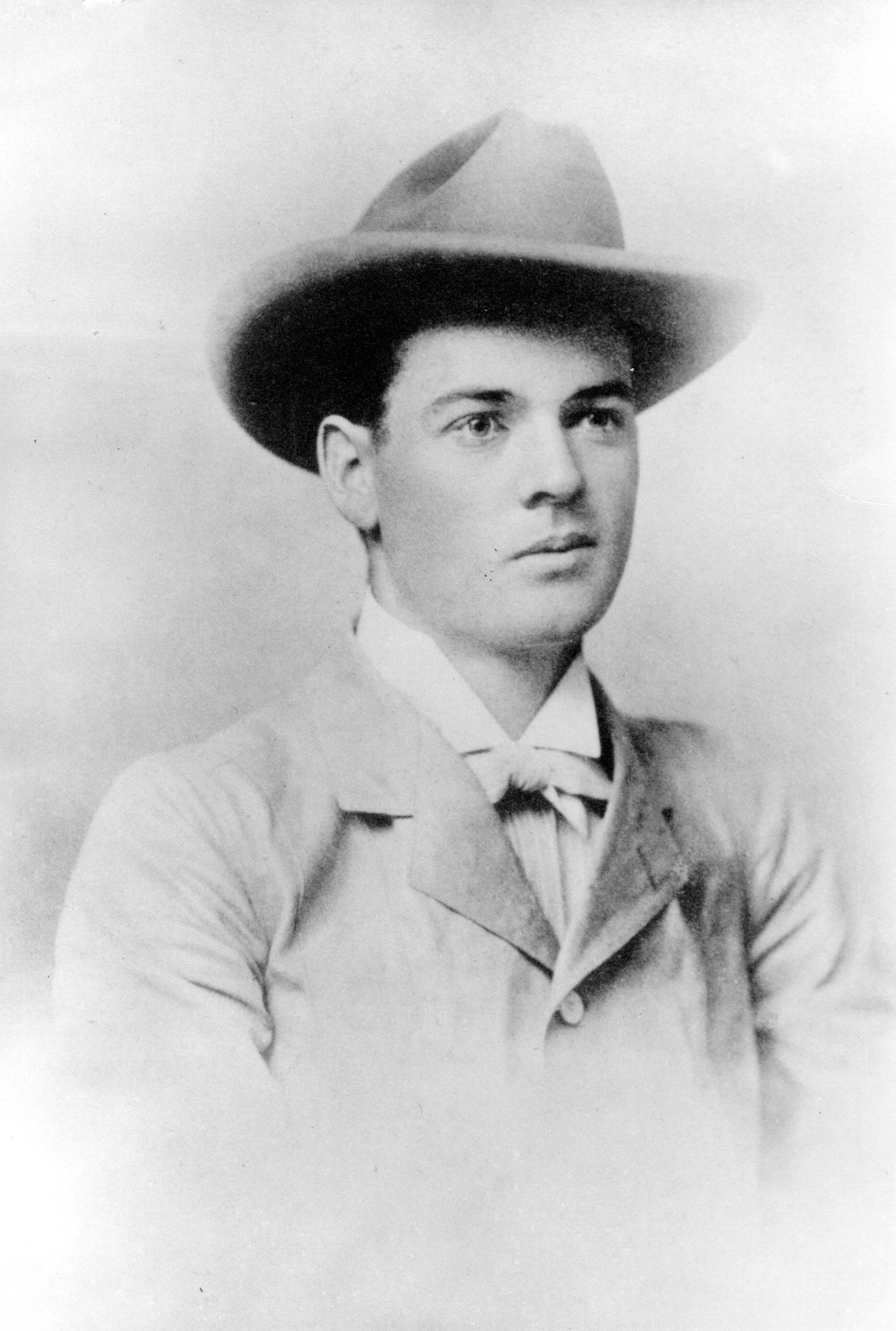
Herbert Hoover (1898)

Colin Fraser (1938)

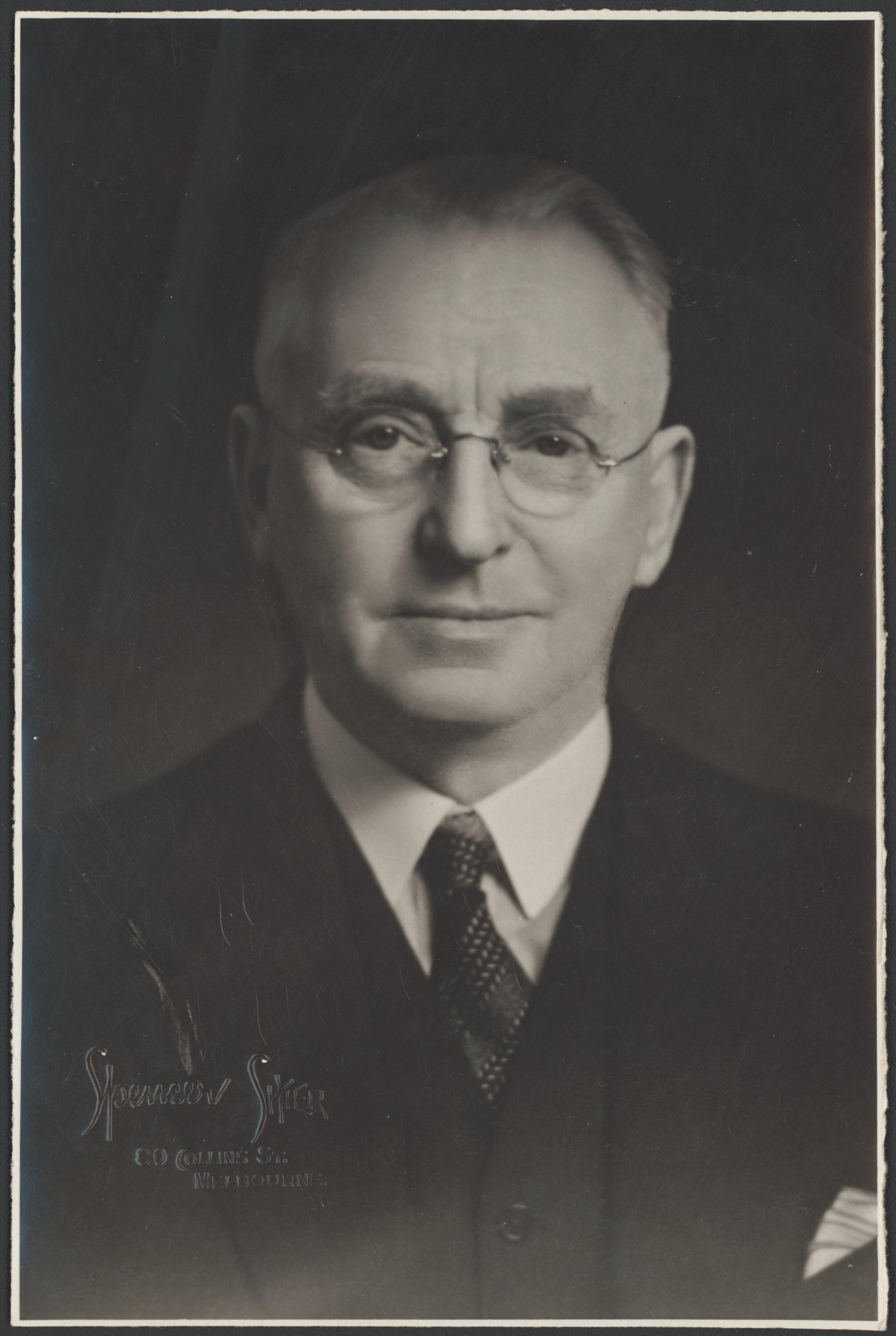
Walter Massy-Green (1938)

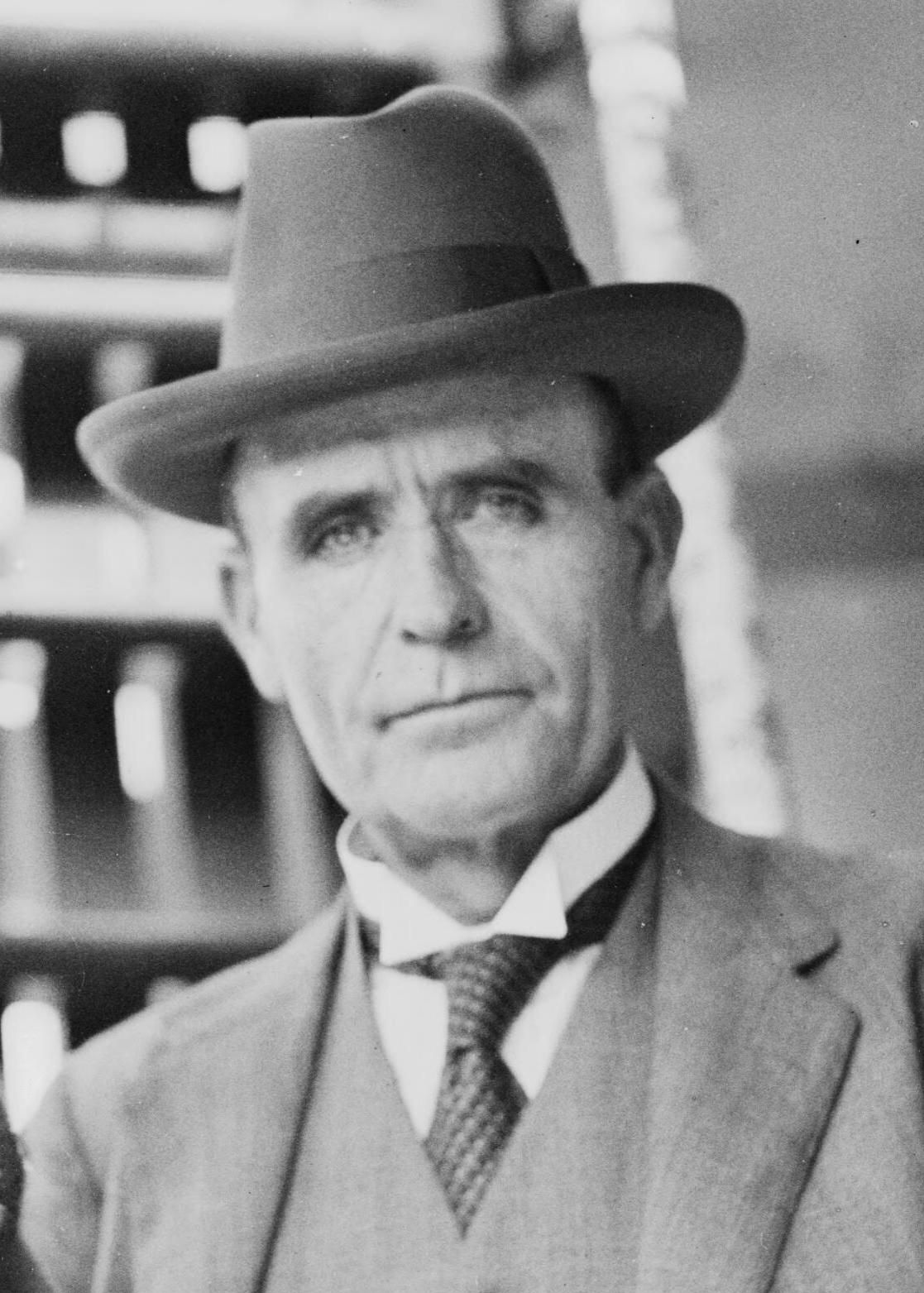
William Watt (1930s)

Herbert Gepp (c.1930)

Montague Cohen (c.1928)

F.A. Govett (c.1910)

J.R. Govett (1928)

Alexander Stewart (1928)

Henry St John Somerset (1928)

John Lynnne Wharton, c.1923

Lindesay Clark (c.1938)

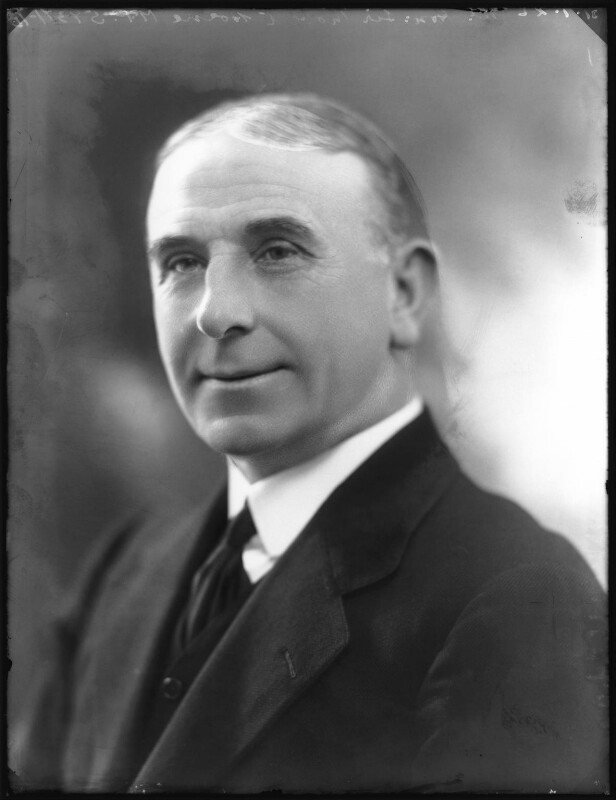
Robert Horne (1922)

Molesworth Green (1906)

Harold Edward Cohen (c.1939)

Edward Cohen (c.1970)

Henry Beaufort Somerset (c.1965)

Auguste de Bavay, in old age

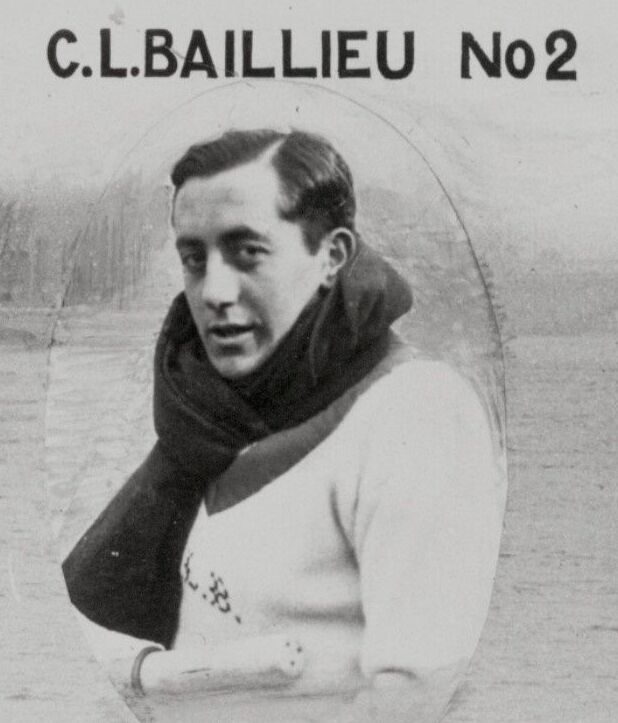
Clive Baillieu, as a rower (1913)

W.M. Hyndman (date unknown)

Andrew Fairweather (c.1935)

Edward Shackell (c.1932)

=== Members of Parliament ===
A number of people associated with the Collins House Group also had political careers, the period of which sometimes overlapped with their periods as directors of Collins House Companies.

==== Australian parliaments ====
William Lawrence Baillieu (1859 – 1936) was a member of the Victorian Legislative Assembly, from 1901, later serving as Minister of Public Works and Health. He also served as leader of the Legislative Council, until 1917. Baillieu retired from politics in 1922.

Arthur Robinson, a brother of Lionel and W.S. Robinson, was elected to the House of Representatives, in 1903, for the Free Trade Party. representing the largely rural electoral division of Wannon. He was described, by his own brother, as 'a dyed in the wool conservative'. Retiring from federal politics in 1906, he then became a member of the Victorian Legislative Council. He led business interests successfully opposing the Essential Services referendum of 1926. He failed in an attempt to reenter federal politics, as a candidate of the Nationalist Party, in 1929.

Walter Massy-Greene (1872 – 1952) joined the newly created Federal Liberal League in 1909. At the 1910 federal election, he was elected to the Division of Richmond with the support of small farmers. He joined the parliamentary Liberal Party and soon became known for his attacks on the Fisher government's financial legislation. Massy-Greene retained his seat at the 1913 election, which saw the Liberals win a one-seat majority in the House of Representatives. He was appointed as party whip by Prime Minister Joseph Cook.

William Alexander Watt (1871 – 1946) had been a member of the Victorian Legislative Assembly. He served two terms as Premier of Victoria, before entering federal politics, as a member of the House of Representatives, at the 1914 federal election, when he defeated the ALP candidate, John Curtin, in the safe Liberal seat of Balaclava.

In 1917, following the Australian Labor Party split of 1916, the Liberal Party and the National Labor Party formed a coalition and Massy-Greene and Alexander Watt both became members of the resultant Nationalist Party, which took government.

Massy-Green served as an Honorary Minister in charge of matters relating to price-fixing, then as Minister for Trade and Customs, later Minister for Health, then Minister for Defence. He was defeated by a Country Party candidate, in 1923, but was appointed as a Nationalist Party Senator, for New South Wales, in 1923, and served to the 1925 election. He was elected to the Senate, from July 1926, and remained a Senator, until his retirement in 1938.

In March 1918, Watt was appointed as Treasurer. After Prime Minister Billy Hughes left Australia for London, Watt was the acting prime minister, until Hughes returned from the Versailles peace conference in August 1919. During this period he also had the portfolio of Trade and Customs. For his service as acting prime minister, Watt was appointed to the Imperial Privy Council in the 1920 New Year Honours. He was the Speaker of the House of Representatives from 1923 to 1926.

==== British parliament ====
Robert Horne was elected as Member of Parliament (MP) for Glasgow Hillhead in 1918. He served under Prime Minister David Lloyd George as Minister of Labour between 1919 and 1920, as President of the Board of Trade between 1920 and 1921 and as Chancellor of the Exchequer between 1921 and 1922. Although never again serving in a ministerial role, he remained in parliament until 1937. He was Chairman of Zinc Corporation Limited, among other directorships.

== Early years (1904 - 1913) ==
=== Origins ===
The origins of the group lay in the revival in Australia mining that began with overcoming four major obstacles; settling upon where to smelt base metal ores, solving the so-called 'sulphide problem', the development of commercially-viable 'froth flotation', and realisation of a means of profitable recovery of zinc metal from zinc ore, especially when accompanied by lead ore. All of these problems had been present in the Broken Hill mines, as the mining moved from the upper 'oxide' zone and into lower levels with sulphide ores. Once all these problems had been solved, a tantalising investment opportunity would arise, and that circumstance was close to arising, by the mid 1900s.

In the two decades before the outbreak of the First World War, British investors were seeking opportunities outside the United Kingdom. A few, such as the Sons of Gwalia mine in Western Australia, were long-lived, fabulous earners, were highly remunerative. However, some eventually were financially unsuccessful. Confidence in Australia, as a destination for investment, had been badly damaged, due to the huge losses associated with the Melbourne land boom and the subsequent Australian banking crisis of 1893.

The challenge was to obtain access to a workable minerals separation technology and apply it, using British capital funding, to the investment opportunities that were arising at the Broken Hill mines.

=== Context ===
Australian base metal mines in the 1890s faced a dilemma over where and how to smelt their ore. The dilemma could be stated in simplistic terms as, 'bring the fuel to the ore or the ore to the fuel'. Essentially, it was a choice between smelting ore at the mine site or at a port or coastal location, especially one near coal mines.

During the early 1890s, the mines at Broken Hill were encountering massive quantities of lead-silver-zinc sulphide ore at deeper levels; that type of ore was more difficult to treat profitably, a metallurgical conundrum referred to as 'the sulphide problem'. It appeared that no one process would be a suitable solution, but instead a combination of processes might be effective. The cost of a specialised smelting plant at a mine site was not economic for smaller mines, especially if the ores needed prior 'wet treatment' using chemicals, such as sulphuric acid, and large volumes of water. In the later half of 1895, reportedly, there was only limited treatment of sulphide ores, in Australia, with much of it being shipped overseas. It was the 'sulphide problem' that first led to BHP diversifying from mining and led to Newcastle steelworks.

John Howell, a Canadian-born American mining engineer and mine manager who worked at Broken Hill, had established an experimental smelter there and successfully smelted sulphide ore, in 1891, although recovery of the zinc content remained a problem. He was general manager at the Proprietary (BHP) mine, when BHP acquired lead smelters at Port Pirie, from British Broken Hill, in 1892. The Proprietary mine already had smelters at Broken Hill, but over time would move all its smelting operations to Port Pirie. Howell was later a key figure in the ultimately unsuccessful Dapto Smelter, and was an early exponent of 'bringing the ore to the fuel'.

The simple ore concentration methods of the 1890s—manual 'picking' and gravity separation—resulted in large amount of gangue material in ore destined for smelting. When smelted, the gangue was separated as slag. Water jacket furnaces were capable of handling large volumes of slag; that made mine site smelting of lower-grade ore seem more viable, provided the mine had a long-enough expected life to justify the capital cost of a smelting operation and the ore was suitable. It was not until the following decade that the development of the froth flotation process, would emphatically alter the balance away from the mine site smelting. Separation using flotation, at the mine site, produced high-grade ore concentrates, with much less gangue content, making it more economic to 'bring the ore to the fuel', or to sell the concentrates to an overseas smelter.

Another problem was dealing with ores that contained both lead and zinc sulphides. Early flotation methods could not separate these ores. Lead could be recovered by early flotation methods, but the zinc remained in the tailings. It would take the development of 'differential flotation', to allow both the zinc and lead sulphide minerals to be separated and recovered using the same process.

Edgar Arthur Ashcroft, an electrical engineer working at Broken Hill, struck by the huge stocks untreated zinc sulphide there, patented an electrolytic process to recover zinc, in 1894. When scaled to an industrial level, at Cockle Creek Smelter, in 1897, it did not meet expectations. The process was subsequently replaced by a more conventional lead smelter. It did, however, point to a future path for zinc metal production.

=== The founders ===
W.L. Baillieu, a land agent and auctioneer, a former participant in the Melbourne land boom, and Lionel Robinson, a mining broker, were well-connected to the City of London financial markets, a suitable circumstance to arrange finance for and investment in mining and smelting ventures in Australia. With Robinson's younger brother, William Sydney Robinson, initially, their efforts focused on the financial reconstruction of North Broken Hill and Broken Hill South mining companies, the floating of Zinc Corporation, and reconstruction of a short-lived venture known as Australian Smelting Corporation.

=== Beginnings of Collins House companies at Broken Hill (1900 - 1913) ===
==== North Broken Hill ====
W.L. Baillieu took a controlling interest in the Victoria Cross mine at Broken Hill in 1900. In 1904, that company was taken over by the North Broken Hill Mining Co., and Baillieu won a place on the North Broken Hill board, in 1904.

==== Zinc Corporation - a shaky start ====
W.L. Baillieu and W.S. Robinson, floated Zinc Corporation in 1905. The initial objective of the company was to process stockpiles of tailings at Broken Hill. The initial capital raising was for £350,000. By October 1905, the company had secured nearly two million tons of zinc rich tailings, from the Block 10, Broken Hill South, Block 14, and British Broken Hill companies. The company also contracted to take around another 5 to 6 million tons of tailings, over a period of years, from Broken Hill South, Block 14, and British mines. The company expected to produce around 900,000 tons of zinc, 350,000 tons of lead, and 22,000 ounces of silver.

Zinc Corporation had among its directors two leading mining engineers of the time, Herbert Hoover and C.S. Hertzig, and the backing of mining management firm, Bewick, Moreing & Co., W. L. Baillieu and W. S. Robinson were also directors. At this stage of its life, the company was not a public company—all scrip was underwritten by the members of a syndicate— and it was registered in Melbourne.

A problem for the new company was that, in 1905, flotation technology—upon which the viability of the venture depended—was still new and immature. Zinc Corporation mentioned, in October 1905, that there were five flotation processes under consideration. These were the patented processes of Elmore, Potter, Delprat, Cattermole, and de Bavay. They were probably also aware of the 1905 British froth flotation patent of Sulman, Picard and Ballot, assigned to Minerals Separation., that would be applied at Broken Hill, by Sulphide Corporation.

Until the technology stabilised, Zinc Corporation would face an uncertain future. Zinc Corporation's operations began with the erection of a pilot plant, intended to use the Potter process, near the British mine. It would be used to treat representative parcels of the various different tailings that were under contract. The company produced its first zinc concentrates in April 1906.

By May 1907, the original capital had been exhausted. In June 1907, the company took a £50,000 loan from its London-based shareholders, and its chairman, W.L. Baillieu, was in negotiation to postpone payments for tailings that it was contracted to take. It was the London-based stockbroker Francis Algenon Govett's connection to the cash-rich Lake View Consols company—owner of large gold mines in Western Australia—that had saved the Zinc Corporation from an early failure. A meeting of shareholders voted to move the head office of the company to London; it was stated that "although the nominal management was in Melbourne, the policy and the directors came from London, where most of the shareholders now were."

Zinc Corporation then revised its pilot plant, but had still not settled on the final process to be used, in November 1906. However, the Potter process had not worked well enough. F. A. Govett and Bewick, Moreing & Co, then insisted on switching to the Cattermole process, owned by Minerals Separation. However, in September 1907, the company stated that it was trialling the older Elmore process. Govett, by then, was the chairman of Zinc Corporation. Shareholders had lost confidence, and the future of Zinc Corporation appeared dire. It was later stated, by Govett, that,"Zinc Corporation was sitting on the edge of a smouldering financial volcano."

Half of the main plant, described as using using the Elmore process, was finished around mid 1908, and was working well a year later. A first dividend was paid, on preference shares only, in late 1909. For a period, four different flotation processes were in use, by four different companies, in Broken Hill.

In 1910, Zinc Corporation reportedly replaced the Elmore process, with the Sulman-Picard-Ballot patent 'froth flotation' process that was owned by Minerals Separation. The truth was somewhat different; Metals Separation sued Zinc Corporation for patent infringement, claiming that the 'Elmore' process was in fact using their technology, and claiming royalties back to 1907. It was just part of a wave of litigation, as the different players in flotation technology sued and counter sued, over claims of patent infringement. It was the name of the process used by Zinc Corporation that had changed, rather than the process itself. However, Zinc Corporation had by then acquired some hard-won knowledge of flotation technology, and reached an accommodation with Minerals Separation.

Govett was also a connection between Zinc Corporation and the Broken Hill South Blocks company. In 1905, 100,000 newly-issued shares in the Broken Hill South Blocks Company had been acquired by a syndicate, under an option organised by Melbourne stockbrokers E. L. and C. Baillieu. That new major shareholder was in fact the Lake View Consols company, and Govett was also that company's chairman.

In March 1911, the Broken Hill South Blocks Company was considering using Zinc Corporation to treat its zinc ores, under a profit sharing arrangement. Instead, in May 1911, the South Blocks mining property was sold to Zinc Corporation, in exchange for ordinary and preference shares in Zinc Corporation. Zinc Corporation then became a mining company. By the end of 1911, the amalgamated company was profitable.

The longer-term future of Zinc Corporation was assured, by the perfection of a technique for differential flotation, which allowed lead and zinc ores to be separated. Fleury James (Jim) Lyster, mill manager at Zinc Corporation, developed a commercially-viable differential flotation process, around 1911. Lyster's process was patented, in May 1912. His patent was assigned to Minerals Separation, in 1913, for which he received £2,375.

==== Amalgamated Zinc (de Bavay) ====
Auguste de Bavay was a brewer and industrial chemist, regarded as an expert in bacteria and yeasts. He was enticed to work for the Fosters Brewery, by Montague Cohen. He became aware of the development of the Potter-Delprat flotation process to separate minerals, and with the support and encouragement of Cohen and W.L. Baillieu, by July 1904 he had developed his own process. Working in his laboratory at Fosters, he developed a skin or film flotation process, known as de Bavay's process. In that same year, Baillieu became a director of North Broken Hill.

The technique used surface tension to separate the sulphide ore particles, which remained dry (hydrophobic) due to being coated in oil and weak acid. The hydrophobic ore particles formed a floating skin or film over the surface, while the gangue material sank. The provess involved no agitation or airation. The major disadvantage of the process was that it needed relatively large surface area, to make it commercially-viable at scale.

In 1904, in partnership with Cohen and Baillieu, he formed de Bavay's Sulphide Process Co. Ltd, and in September 1905, de Bavay's Treatment Co. Ltd; In October 1908 he was paid £6,583 in cash and shares for his five patents dealing with extraction of zinc sulphide. In 1909, Amalgamated Zinc (de Bavay's) Ltd was established, as a public company, to exploit the process. Broken Hill South contracted its tailings to be processed by the company.

A mill and treatment plant was built on the North Broken Hill lease, near the old Victoria Cross mine shaft, and it treated ore from the North Mine, using the de Bavay process. In 1912, a subsidiary company, Minerals Separation and De Bavay's Process of Australia Proprietary. Ltd. was formed; it was owned partly by Minerals Separation and partly by Amalgamated Zinc (de Bavay).

==== Broken Hill South ====
Broken Hill South had been founded in 1889, as Broken Hill South Silver Mining Company. By 1905, one of its directors was a mining engineer, C.S. Hertzig, who had an association with Bewick, Moreing and Company, and its consultant engineer, Herbert Hoover, who was working with W.S. Robinson and W.L. Baillieu on Zinc Corporation's plans.

In September 1905, Broken Hill South contracted the sale of its dumped tailings, but as a part of that agreement did not disclose the names of the purchasers. Reports of the time linked the deal to a recent visit to Broken Hill, by W.L. Baillieu, Lionel Robinson, and Herbert Hoover. However, in the early years of the emerging CHG, Broken Hill South Silver Mining Company remained an independent company, without CHG directors on its board.

==== Other companies at Broken Hill - Attempted amalgamation of Junction North with NBH ====
Interests associated with the emerging grouping, later Collins House Group, also took up shareholdings in other Broken Hill mining companies with a view to organising financial reconstructions. In October 1905 a newspaper report stated, " An agreement was entered into, to-day under which the directors of the Junction North Company — subject to formal confirmation at a shareholders' meeting— have sold to Messrs. E. L. and C. Baillieu 25,000 shares at 12s. each, together with the option of purchase over an additional 25.000 shares, at a similar price, within six months; the stock to be provided by tlie 'reconstruction of the Junction Nortih Company into an association consisting of 180,000 shares of £1 each, all fully paid up, with a London register. A deposit of £1900 is to be paid forthwith. It is understood Messrs. E. L. and C. Baillieu are acting on behalf of an English syndicate, of which Messrs. Bewick, Moremg and Co. and Mr. Lionel Robinson are the leading members."

It was part of a plan by W.L. Baillieu to amalgamate North Junction with North Broken Hill, but that plan did not proceed, in 1906.

Early 'Collins House' ventures associated with Broken Hill

North nine, Broken Hill, c.1911

South mine, c.1911

Zinc Corporation, pilot flotation plant, 1906.

Amalgamated Zinc (de Bavay's) works, 1911

=== Australian Smelting Corporation (1905 - 1909) - an abandoned venture ===
In August 1905, the shareholders, of Smelting and Refining Company of Australia—owner and operator of Dapto Smelting Works—approved the sale of their assets to Consolidated Nickel Mines and resolved to enter voluntary liquidation. In late 1905, a new company, Australian Smelting Company, was formed to take an option over the assets of Smelting and Refining Company of Australia.

Zinc Corporation had been formed to process accumulated tailings, from the Broken Hill mines, which still contained significant amounts of lead, silver and especially zinc. During 1906, it seemed that there was a tentative agreement to smelt the resulting concentrates, at a new smelter at Port Kembla, to be operated by Australian Smelting Company. In January 1907, Zinc Corporation began to produce concentrates, at Broken Hill, reprocessing around 500 tons of tailings per day. It was envisaged, by that time, that the smelting of those concentrates would be done overseas.

In March 1907, Australian Smelting Company decided upon a capital reconstruction involving debentures. This resulted in the formation of yet another company, Australian Smelting Corporation—but many sources from the time still refer to that company by the old company's name, Australian Smelting Company. Debenture holders in the old company agreed to swap its debentures, with a face value of £80,000, for £65,250 worth of debentures in the new one. Interests with control of concentrates from Broken Hill were to subscribe to both the preference shares and debentures.

Directors of the new company included some figures of the emerging Collins House Group; W.L. Baillieu, William Clark, and their associate Herbert Hoover, of Bewick, Moreing and Co.. Other directors were drawn from boards of North Broken Hill and Broken Hill South. A number of the directors were also directors of Zinc Corporation.

In January 1908, the Australian Smelting Corporation resolved to enter voluntary liquidation, and begin yet another capital reconstruction. That proposed capital reconstruction met with little enthusiasm from investors; it took longer than perhaps was anticipated. It was not agreed, before at earliest November 1908. By then, their partially-implemented plan for an operation at Port Kembla—relocated from the Dapto Smelting Works—had been stopped by a lack of funds.

In early 1908, the North Broken Hill company was grappling with the question of smelting its ores, in Australia rather than in Europe. The dilemma arose because price competition between European smelters had declined, due to the rapidly expanding supply of galena concentrates from Broken Hill. The directors stated that buying the Port Kembla smelter was being considered. An option to buy the assets, with a six-months term, was granted to the Broken Hill South and North Broken Hill companies. However, in May 1909, they decided not to take up the option. It was the final end of Australian Smelting Corporation. Its land at Port Kembla was the site on which Metal Manufactures would later erect their plant.

=== Hampden Cloncurry Copper Mines ===
Brokers associated with the CHG managed a capital raising for Hampden Clonncurry Copper Mines, in 1906, and the company had some CHG figures on its board. Collins House interests seem to have been in control of this venture by 1910, with W.L. Baillieu being its chairman.

=== Outlet to international markets ===
In late 1911, Zinc Corporation were having their lead concentrate from Broken Hill smelted at the Port Pirie smelters, which were owned than by BHP. North Broken Hill and South Broken Hill were still exporting their concentrates for smelting.

Before 1914, despite some English and American competition, three German metal trading companies—Metallgesellschaft AG and Beer, Sondheimer & Co., both from Frankfurt am Main, and Aron Hirsch & Sohn, of Halberstadt—largely controlled the international base metals market. They were known as 'the Trio'. Aron Hirsch & Sohn was particularly important in Australia; it owned a third of Electrolytic Refining and Smelting—with Mount Morgan owning the remainder—and it marketed all of that plant's copper production, as well as most of the lead and zinc produced by the Collins House companies.

== First World War (1914 - 1918) ==
=== The crisis caused by the outbreak of war ===
Prior to the outbreak of the First World War, Germany dominated trade in base metals. Over 80% of Australian silver-lead-zinc concentrates were shipped, either to Germany or German-owned smelters in Belgium, for smelting. Germany imported 90% of the concentrates it processed, from Australia. Figures of the emerging CHG were uneasy with their dependency upon Germany, but earlier schemes to acquire their own smelting capacity—such as Australian Smelting Corporation—had not made financial sense.

The outbreak of a war with the country of its main customer, was a disaster for the Collins House mining companies. Many ships laden with cargoes of concentrates were at sea, bound for Germany, Belgium or Holland loaded with silver, lead and zinc concentrates. Some turned back, or were re-routed to British or neutral ports, but some unloaded cargoes at the neutral port, Rotterdam, well after the war had begun. The Collins House companies were not paid for those shipments, and their cash flow dried up. Even sales to America—then a neutral country—were a problem, because the German companies had influence there. The government did permit some sales of Broken Hill zinc concentrate to America and France, in 1915.

Britain needed lead and zinc for the war effort, but lacked any significant zinc smelting capacity. It could not immediately provide a market to replace the German-owned smelters. Britain in fact had to buy lead and zinc metal at high prices, from the United States. Meanwhile, mining operations at Broken Hill were scaled back, but large stockpiles of concentrates nonetheless began to accumulate, at Broken Hill and Port Pirie.

=== Trading with the enemy allegations, raid on Collins House, and rapprochement ===
The Collins House companies and other mining companies were in a predicament, either face financial ruin or sell cargoes to neutral countries—such as Sweden, Netherlands, or Denmark—in the knowledge that those cargoes could be transshipped to Germany. Billy Hughes, Attorney-General of the incoming Fisher ministry, was dedicated to winning the war, and to eliminating any German influence over the Australian economy and world metals trade.

A suspicion had arisen that some Australian base metals entities were trading with the enemy. There was some evidence that the copper refinery, E.R. & S.—in 1914, not yet part of CHG, and still one third owned by Aron Hirsch & Sohn—had made contracts with Francis Hugh Snow, acting in the capacity as the German company's local agent. He was subsequently acquitted, in May 1915, of a charge of trading with the enemy. The High Court refused leave to appeal, but Snow stood trial again on two charges of trading with the enemy, in late 1915, and was found guilty on the second charge. His conviction was quashed on a technicality, in 1916. Nonetheless, the High Court was again involved, in late 1918, and this time ordered a new trial. Snow was eventually convicted, in September 1919, and gave up his protracted legal fight, paying a £2,000 fine and court costs.

On 8 November 1914, military officers raided the offices of mining companies at Collins House. It was reported that, "the military authorities were desirous of obtaining certain information concerning the disposal of metals the various companies produced, and also information as to contracts entered into by the companies since the war started for the supply of metals."

W.L. Baillieu issued a statement, saying, "The authorities have asked me not to make any statement to the press; therefore at this stage I will refrain from comment on these proceedings, except to say that. I am staggered that it should be thought necessary to take the steps the authorities have done to satisfy themselves that the metal-producing companies concerned have not been acting inimically to the public interest, but the public may rest assured that the companies have nothing to hide. They welcome the fullest investigation into their transactions, and will afford every facility to that end."

The Enemy Contracts Annulment Act, compelling termination of any remaining contracts with German-controlled entities, was passed in May 1915. As its scope also affected powers held individual Australian states, complementary legislation was passed by each of the states.

Collins House figure W.L.Wharton vigorously denied that BHAS and other Broken Hill companies had engaged in disloyal actions.

Initially outraged by Hughes apparent campaign against the mining companies, Baillieu, who preferred negotiation to confrontation, came to understand that Hughes's actual objectives were to end the previous German-dominated industry arrangements and establish a smelting and refining industry in Australia. That presented an opportunity for the Collins House companies. Baillieu and Hughes moved, from being bitter opponents, to being close working allies.

=== The response of the mining companies and push for self-sufficiency ===
==== Broken Hill Associated Smelters ====
The Broken Hill Proprietary Co. (BHP) owned its own smelters at Port Pirie and had marketed its own base metal production. The only other company with its own lead smelter was Sulphide Corporation. After the outbreak of war, BHP offered to smelt lead ore for the other companies at Broken Hill, which allowed those mining companies to remain in operation.

In 1915, BHP opened its Newcastle steelworks, and its Broken Hill operations became less significant to its future. By that time, the Port Pirie smelters had become run down and inefficient, and were in need of more capital. BHP was willing to sell down its smelting interests, and the Collins House companies needed a reliable outlet for their concentrates that was under British Empire control.

In April 1915, North Broken Hill, Broken Hill South, and the Broken Hill Proprietary Company established the jointly-owned Broken Hill Associated Smelters (BHAS), with capital of £750,000. The new venture acquired from BHP, the smelter at Port Pirie, the coke works at Bellambi—it supplied the smelter with coke, shipped from Port Bellambi—and all the existing contracts for smelting. BHP was paid £450,000 (£200,000 in shares in the new company and the rest in cash); each of the three companies owned a third, leaving the Collins House companies in control. W.L. Baillieu and W.S. Robinson were directors. At a somewhat later date, Zinc Corporation bought in for £100,000 bringing Collins House's control to a 5:2 ratio.

Assets of Broken Hill Associated Smelters

Port Pirie smelter, c.1911

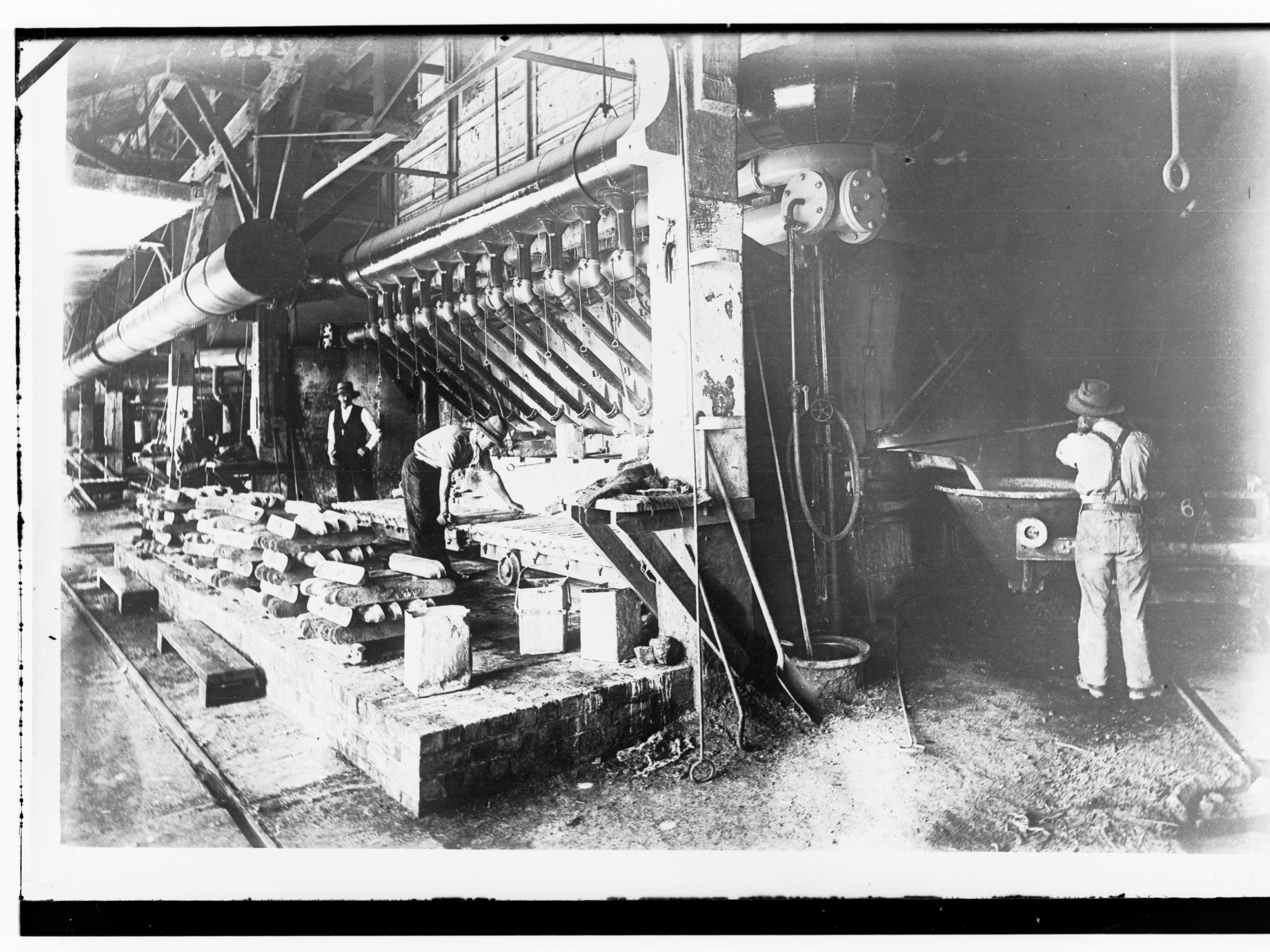
Water jacket furnace smelting lead, c.1915. Ingots are being cast on left and slag is being run off on right.

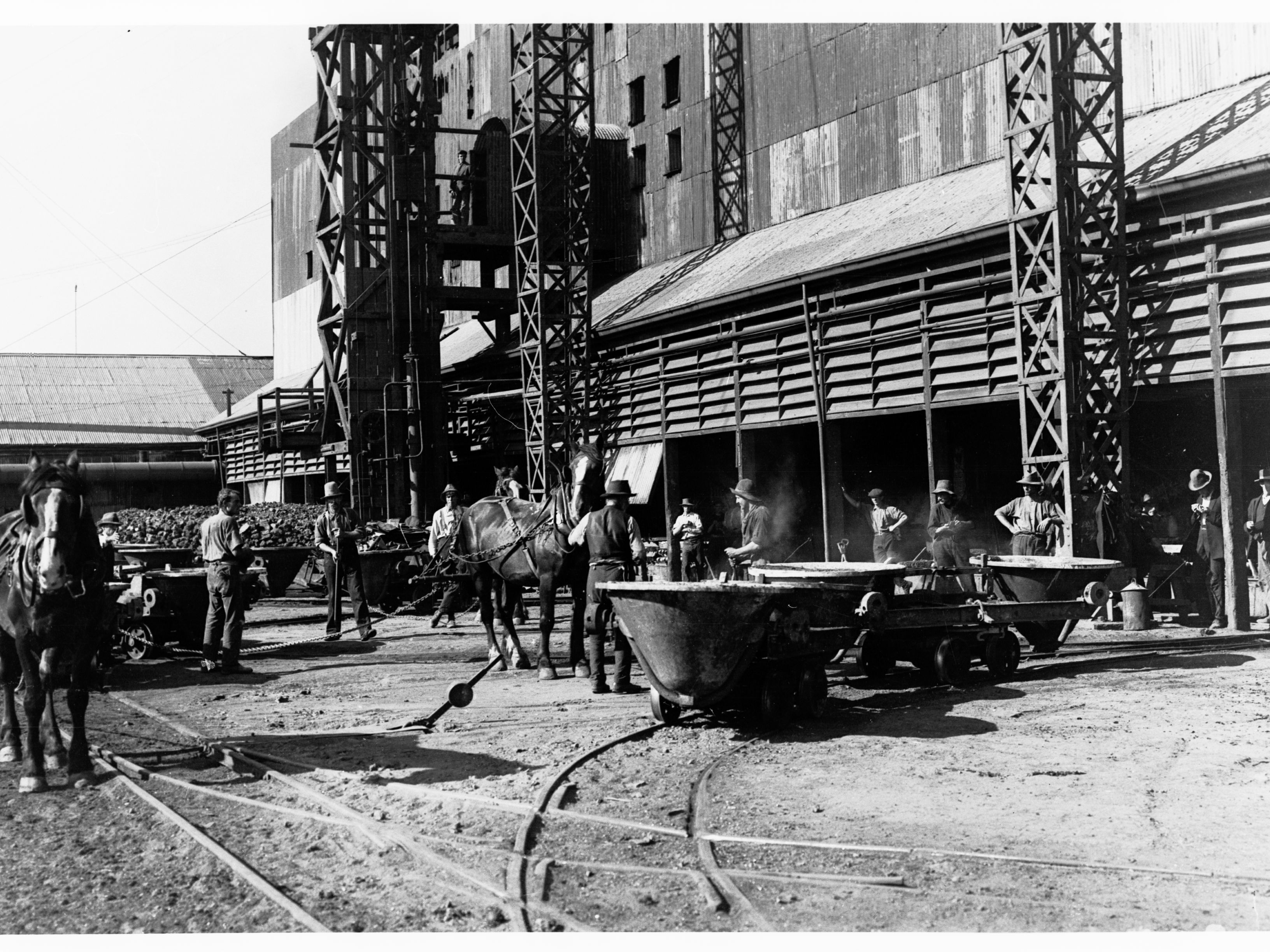
Slag wagons outside the smelter, c.1915

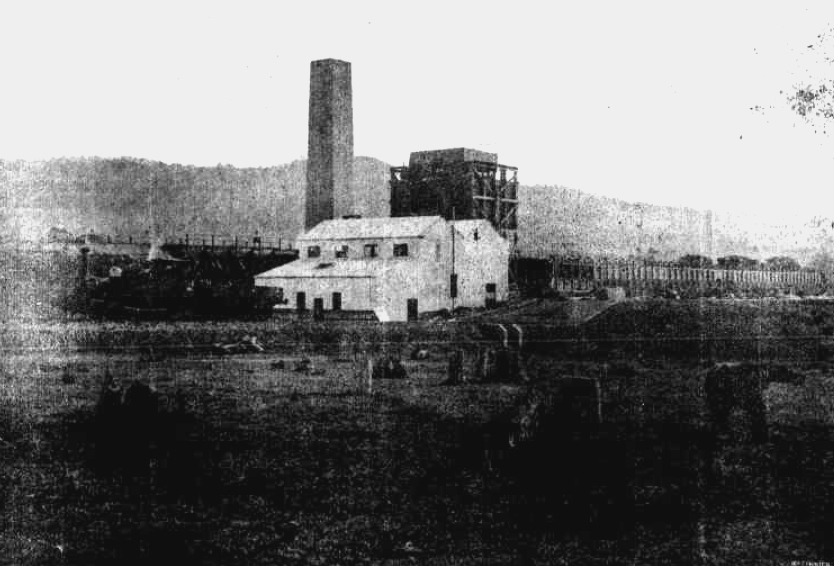
Bellambi coke works, 1903

==== Barrier South Limited ====
Taking advantage of the wartime downturn and its affect on smaller miners, Zinc Corporation began to acquire an interest in Barrier South Limited, in 1915.

==== Hampden Cloncurry copper ====
The mine had an on-site smelter which produced blister copper, which also had a significant silver and gold content that could be recovered by Electrolytic refining at Port Kembla. It was profitable, particularly under the higher wartime copper prices.

Low copper prices and shipping difficulties led to the end of smelting operations at the end of 1920. By 1927, the companies profits were derived from shareholdings in other CHG companies, such as E.R. & S., sale of ore 'at grass', and from tribute mining levies. Collins House figure E.H. Shackell was the liquidator of the company in 1928.

==== Amalgamated Zinc (de Baveys) ====
By mid 1915, Amalgamated Zinc (de Bavey) had severed its contact with its only then customer, the German controlled Australian Metals Company, which held a contract to buy all AZ's zinc concentrate production, until 31 December 1919. Its managing director Herbert Gepp travelled to America, during 1915, to find new outlets for its zinc concentrates.

In 1917, North Broken Hill commissioned its own mill and treatment plant using the Minerals Separation 'froth flotation' process. Deprived of a major source of material to treat, the Amalgamated Zinc plant ceased operation on 5 April 1917. Later, the South mine continued to supply the de Bavey works, but the final closure of the plant occurred in 1925, when the land on which it stood was needed for mining activity.

The company, Amalgamated Zinc, effectively became a holding company within the Collins House Group. Amalgamated Zinc, no longer involved at Broken Hill, focused instead on the island state of Tasmania. It took up a large shareholding in Electrolytic Zinc.

==== Beginnings of Electrolytic Zinc ====
Metallurgist James Hyndes Gillies invented an electrolytic process for the treatment of zinciferous ores and between 1904 and 1907, took out a series of patents in America, Europe, Mexico, and Australasia. He set up an experimental plant in Melbourne, and then floated the Complex Ores Co. in 1908. He proposed to set up a full-scale works in Tasmania, using hydro-electric power. A subsidiary of Complex Ores, Hydro-Electric Power and Metallurgical Co. Ltd was founded, in January 1911, and Gillies raised capital in London.

Work began on the hydroelectric scheme in 1910, but the venture was in financial trouble by the end of 1912. In May 1914, Gillies sold the partially-built hydroelectric scheme to the Tasmanian government. The Tasmanian government continued work on the project, including the Waddamana Hydro-Electric Power Station, which was entered service in 1916. However, the planned consumer of its power had been lost, and an opportunity existed to set up an electrolytic zinc works in Tasmania. Gillies would live to see his scheme implemented by others, and using someone else's electrolytic zinc process.

Electrolytic Zinc Company of Australasia Ltd was founded in mid 1916. The new company's board included figures from the emerging Collins House Group. It planned to erect an electrolytic Zinc plant in Tasmania, using American technology, which had been identified by Herbert Gepp. In 1916, a contract for the supply of power was signed with the Tasmanian government. A pilot plant was established in 1917. The first unit of the new plant, at Risdon, was operating by January 1918, producing zinc from concentrates produced at the Amalgamated Zinc (De Bavay's) plant in Broken Hill.

One of the few, albeit brief, connections between a Collins House Group company—Electrolytic Zinc—and Mount Lyell Mining and Railway Company, was that Mount Lyell took EZ shares in payment for its Read-Rosebery mine, in Tasmania. Their shares were later offered to EZ shareholders.

==== Zinc Producers Association ====
In March 1916, a new company, Zinc Producers Association Pty Ltd, was incorporated, The original founding registered shareholders were just two Collins House figures, Montague Cohen and J. L. Wharton, with one share each. The company had a nominal capital of £100,000 in 100,000 shares of £1 each, which would be allocated to participating companies, in proportion to their historic production levels of zinc concentrate.

A newspaper article at the time described the purpose of the new entity, "Practically the Australian output of zinc concentrates— estimated at from 400,000 to 450,000 tons per annum— will be 'pooled' upon the basis of the value of the concentrates produced by each individual company. For instance, a company which produces,' say, 49 per cent, zinc concentrate will receive 'a larger monetary return than a company producing a 46 per cent, zinc concentrate. The capital employed by the Zinc Producers' Association is entitled to receive a dividend of up to 10 per cent, per annum. The profits of the organisation will be divided among its individual members — the companies specified above—upon co-operative lines."

Described as a 'central organisation', it was an incorporated form of a domestic sellers' cartel that controlled the output of zinc concentrates from Australian mines. Its formation was necessary, primarily to replace the German companies, 'the Trio', as an outlet for zinc concentrates, but had a secondary purpose of ensuring that the zinc concentrate was marketed to Allied countries only, under an arrangement referred to as the Empire trade scheme, a policy strongly advocated by the Australian government under Billy Hughes. So, unlike the classic sellers' cartel, which has some ability to influence prices by reducing competition or constraining supply, it entered a long-term contract, to sell the entire output to the British Government, which would only expire in June 1930.

The companies pooling their outputs of zinc concentrates under this arrangement included companies of the Collins House Group—Amalgamated Zinc (De Bavay's), Zinc Corporation, Broken Hill South, North Broken Hill—and its downstream processors—Broken Hill Associated Smelters, Electrolytic Zinc—other Broken Hill mining companies—Broken Hill Proprietary, Sulphide Corporation, Block 10, Block 14, British Broken Hill!, Junction North, Broken Hill Junction—but also the Mount Lyell Mining & Railway, with mines in Tasmania, and even a non-Australian zinc producer—one allied to CHG—Burmah Corporation.

==== Further cooperation with the Australian and British Governments ====
The National Smelting Company was established in England, in 1917, to take over zinc smelting operations at Avonmouth and expand capacity. It was owned by the British Government. This was done in coordination with the Australian government and would process the zinc concentrates being supplied to it under the British Government's contract—to expire 10 years after the end of the war—with the CHG-controlled Zinc Producers' Association.

== Collins House and its emerging public image (1919 - 1924) ==
Collins House opened in 1911. Its name did not enter the public's imagination initially. That began to change in the early 1920s. Melbourne was already the financial capital of Australia, and up to 1927, also its political capital.

=== Shareholder meetings and board meetings ===
Collins House became the venue for shareholder meetings and board meetings, both of CHG companies and other companies that made use of the facilities of the building. That meant that the name 'Collins House' appeared regularly in newspapers, in reports of the meetings.

=== Collins House and the Broken Hill strike of 1919 - 1920 ===
In 1892, before the CHG became mine owners at Broken Hill, there had been a bitter mining strike, at the end of which the unions had been defeated, and their power effectively broken. By 1919, circumstances were quite different and the miners' union at Broken Hill made demands for greater pay and improved conditions.

During the year long Broken Hill mining strike of 1919 - 1920, Collins House became the venue for conferences between the national leadership of unions and mine management representing the Broken Hill mine owners. It also became the site for tribunals working on industrial relations matters, not connected to Broken Hill, such as a dispute between shipowners and marine engineers, in 1920.

=== Stockbrokers, company floats, shares issues, and underwriting ===
The stockbrokers associated with the Collins House Group made commissions from share floats and issues of shares, which usually were made by public offers, in both London and Melbourne. It had been E. L. and C. Baillieu (in Melbourne) and Lionel Robinson, Clark, and Co (in London) that were behind the formation of Zinc Corporation, and F.A. Govett became its saviour in 1907. Thereafter, new floats and issues for CHG companies were a source of income to those interests.

As an example, Amalgamated Zinc (De Bavay's) Limited was floated, in 1909, it was stated that, "The issue (says the "Argus") is subject to a brokerage of 3d. per share, for all shares applied for by brokers, as well as to an underwriting commission of 5 per cent. to Messrs. E. L. and C. Baillieu and their co-underwriters, Mr. F. A. Govett, Messrs. Lionel Robinson, Clark, and Co., and Mr. W. R. Robinson."

The different companies of the Collins House Group and their interlocking ownership arrangements made it easier to raise money for floating new jointy-owned companies. The combined weight of the CHG was similar to BHP, but its companies, in theory at least, remained multiple independent entities.

The same circumstance allowed share issues for one company's acquisition of new assets to be offered to shareholders of other CHG companies, increasing the prospect of a successful capital raising. As an example, when Electrolytic Zinc bought the Mount Read and Rosebery mines in 1920, new Electrolytic Zinc shares were "offered for subscription to the shareholders of the constituent companies in the following proportions, viz.: Amalgamated Zinc (De Bavay's) Liimited, 360,000 shares, North Broken Hill Limited, 180,000 shares; Broken Hill South Limited, 180,000 shares; Zinc Corporation Limited, 180,000 shares."

=== Involvement in politics and political influence ===
==== Free trade vs. protection ====
The issue of protection against imports was the principal political division of late 19th-century Australia. In New South Wales, almost alone of the Australian colonies, there was widespread support for free trade. A growing force was the Labor Party; it somewhat favoured protection, as a means to maintain relatively high wages, but also advocated nationalisation of major industries, complicating its policy toward private enterprises. With Federation, in 1901, tariffs and duties between the colonies were abolished and the matter of import protection became one for the new Commonwealth of Australia to decide at a national level. The first election resulted in a Protectionist minority government in the new Australian House of Representatives, and the national policy thereafter favoured protection, for many decades.

The Collins House Group championed private enterprise, and opposed changes in the law which advanced the cause of organised labour. However, unusually among Melbourne-based business organisations, Collins House mining companies favoured free trade.

Protection of urban manufacturing and other secondary industries tended to result in higher wages levels, generally, including for miners and others working in unprotected, export-oriented primary industries. That had three effects; first it made exports less competitive, in the global market and so potentially reduced market share—perhaps even to the extent of affecting a mine's viability—second, it lowered mining companies' profits, due to the higher proportion of such revenue as remained going to wages; and third, protective tariffs increased costs to mining companies of mining machinery and consumable items used in mining, whether imported or not. By 1927, Australian tariffs were higher than any country, with the exception of the United States.

Base metal and other commodity export prices collapsed just before the Great Depression. The Scullin government increased tariffs, a move strongly opposed by Collins House interests. The Lyons UAP government of 1931, reduced tariffs for imported equipment used by the mining industry. Collins House interests subsequently made large investments in gold mining and in exploration and mine development at Broken Hill.

==== Collins House as a bastion of capitalism and plutocracy ====
Following the successful Bolshevik Revolution in Russia, there had been an upsurge in left-wing political activity in Australia. Two outcomes of this upsurge were the founding of the Communist Party of Australia , in 1920—with a Marxist-Leninist ideology —and there were attempts by another group, Industrial Workers of the World—known as IWW, or by opponents 'the Wobblies' —to sign up members taken from existing trade unions, including miners. IWW in Australia was associated with another political party, Socialist Labor Party, which followed theories of De Leonism. More significantly, the mainstream Australian Labor Party became more socialist in its outlook, adopting an official policy known as the socialist objective, in 1921.

Left wing organisations attempting to influence public opinion had newspapers, and those papers began to use the name of Collins House as a synonym for monopoly capitalism and its political influence. In a 1924 article, titled "Collin's House - A Centre of Australian Capitalism.- How the 'Interlocking' System Works"—quoting information from Smith's Weekly—The Worker's Weekly opined, "From 'Smith's Weekly' of March 1, much is learned regarding Australia's leading capitalists, whose offices are situated at Collin's House, Melbourne. This article is very illuminating in the manner it shows how the same men have controlling interests in the big industrial concerns of Australia. It has been estimated that 1,000 millionaires control the world at the present time, and probably 100 wealthy men to-day dominate Australian Capitalism."

The article that had been quoted by The Workers Weekly, from the mainstream paper, Smith's Weekly stated, "To-day, Collins House is the most powerful financial group in Victoria — possibly in Australia; It is a nerve centre, whose vibrations affect the pulse of business and investment in every State of the Commonwealth. No one can become a Collins House tenant whose credentials do not hear the hallmark of financial stability. Thus there is maintained an aristocracy of wealth which breathes the rarified atmosphere of the dizzy heights:, where dwell the Baillieus, the Robinsons, the Frasers, and the Kellys, and others, whose word is law in the Money Market."

The name 'Collins House' entered the public lexicon, less due to any efforts of the occupants of the building and more through those of their critics.

== Heyday during the inter-war years (1919 - 1939) ==
=== Electrolytic Refining & Smelting ===
The Electrolytic Refining and Smelting Company of Australia Ltd (ER & S) was two thirds owned by Mount Morgan and one-third owned by Aron Hirsch & Sohn, a large German company and one of 'The Trio'. It operated a copper smelter and refinery at Port Kembla, fed largely from the Mount Morgan gold and copper mine, but also from other miners such as Mount Lyell and the CHG-controlled Hampden Cloncurry.

In 1913, E.L. Bailieu and Lionel Robinson became directors of Mount Morgan Gold Mining Co, after a large share transfer, giving CHG some influence over Mount Morgan. Mount Morgan increased its share of ownership in ER & S, as a result of the expropriation of the German-owned shares in 1916. The liquidation of Mount Morgan assets, when the mine closed in 1928, left Collins House interests in full control of ER&S.

Also in 1928, ER & S lost the supply of blister copper from Mount Lyell, which established its own electrolytic refinery, using hydroelectric power. ER &S did continue to process copper from Mount Morgan, once that mine reopened, under new ownership. CHG companies would not mine significant amounts of copper until the 1960s.

=== Electrolytic Zinc ===
In 1920, Electrolytic Zinc bought, by means of an issue of shares, "the Hercules, Primrose, and other mines and plant, situated near North Dundas, Tasmania."

The plant at Risdon was completed by the beginning of 1923, and was designed to consume the full 30,000 horsepower (22.38 MW) of electricity, which had been contracted from the Tasmanian government. It was designed to treat over 100,000 tons of concentrates annually, producing 40,000 tons of zinc, with some lead and silver as by products. Another by product was 30,000 sulphur, in the form of sulphur dioxide, from which was produced sulphuric acid.

=== Broken Hill ===
==== First consolidation of the Broken Hill mines (1923 - 1931) ====
North Broken Hill took over British Broken Hill Pty.Ltd, in 1923, the Junction mine, in 1929, and the Junction North mine, in 1931..The Junction North mine had previously taken over the Pinnacles mine, in 1918.

==== 'Round Table' wage fixing ====
A unique aspect of industrial relations at Broken Hill was what was known the Round Table wage bargaining system. It withdrew the companies and employees—represented by the Barrier Industrial Council—from the direct purview of the NSW state arbitration system, in 1925. The companies presented there case using the accounts of their companies, which they showed to the unions. The two parties then agreed upon the wage rates and conditions that would then apply in the mines.

An outcome was relative industrial peace, at Broken Hill, and special conditions that applied only to the mines there. By 1927, Broken Hill miners' had a 35-hour week of five working days, at a time when other Australian metalliferous miners still worked a 44-hour week.

=== Port Pirie smelter ===
It was reported in January 1926 that BHP had sold its remaining share of Broken Hill Associated Smelters Proprietary Limited to North Broken Hill, Broken Hill South, and Zinc Corporation. As part of the same deal, BHP's production of lead concentrates would still be smelted at Port Pirie, and BHP would continue to supply iron ore as flux to the smelter. Now totally controlled by the three Collins House Group companies, BHAS made a large expansion of the plant.

=== Gold mining companies - GMA and WMC (1930s) ===
The beginning of the Great Depression is usually held to be the Wall Street crash of 1929. However, Australia was already experiencing the effects of declining export income, and higher unemployment, after the decision to return the pound sterling to the gold standard—the Australian pound was pegged to the pound sterling—in 1925. That decision left both currencies overvalued, but was more or less immediately damaging to the Australian economy.

In 1929, Australia left the gold standard, resulting in a devaluation of the Australian pound relative to the pound sterling. Britain later devalued the pound sterling against gold in 1931, when it too abandoned the gold standard, increasing the gold price in both British and Australian currencies. Various currency pegs of the Australian pound to sterling applied, until December 1931, when the Australian government set a rate of £A 1 to 16 shillings sterling. The US abandoned the gold standard in 1933, but the official U.S. Government gold price was increased from US$20.67 to US$35 in 1934.

W.S. Robinson had foreseen the relative rise in the price of gold that would result from currency devaluations, as the world economy entered the Great Depression. In 1930, he established a syndicate in London that became Gold Mines of Australia (GMA), which developed some gold mines in eastern Australia. The syndicate also held some options and large gold exploration reservations, in Western Australia. It was planned to explore these using new techniques such as aerial surveys and scientific assessments, and for that purpose Western Mining Corporation Limited (WMC) was incorporated, in Melbourne, in 1933. Colin Fraser was foundation chairman of both new organisations, GMA and WMC.

There was also a financing vehicle, known as Gold Exploration and Finance Co. of Australia Ltd (GEFCA), established in 1934, which initially held large shareholdings in the new companies—95% of WMC and 62% of GMA—and which raised its funding mainly from London-based South African mining interests.

These developments were part of a general revival of the Australian gold mining industry. Apart from the mines of the Collins House Group, the revival included the reopening of the Mount Morgan mine, as an open cut, under new ownership, and the reopening of the Occidental gold mine, as the New Occidental Mine.

Moving into the reviving gold mining industry was a shrewd and timely move for the Collins House Group; its base metals companies faced falling prices and volumes, as the Great Depression resulted in base metal markets being oversupplied.

=== International cartels ===
==== Lead cartel ====
A meeting was held in London, in September 1928, to form a lead cartel, under the chairmanship of Robert Horne, "a leading figure in the affairs of Zinc Corporation". Among the matters considered was "whether it was desirable to attempt to regulate supplies of the metal to the market." The view at that time seems to have been that production and consumption were in balance. In any case, the attempt to create a lead cartel failed. The lead cartel agreement was revived in 1938, when Colin Fraser went to London for negotiations.

==== Zinc cartel ====
The contract between Zinc Producers Association and the British Government, under which the government committed to buy the entire output of zinc concentrate from Australian mines, was due to expire on 30 June 1930.

A zinc cartel was established in 1931, with only limited success, because it broke down in 1934. The cartel agreement was renewed in 1936.

=== Imperial zinc smelters ===
In 1929, interests associated with the Collins House Group bought the assets of the National Smelting Company. It was reconstructed as the Imperial Zinc Smelters, and became a company of the CHG.

=== Shale Oil - a short-lived venture (1930 - 1931) ===
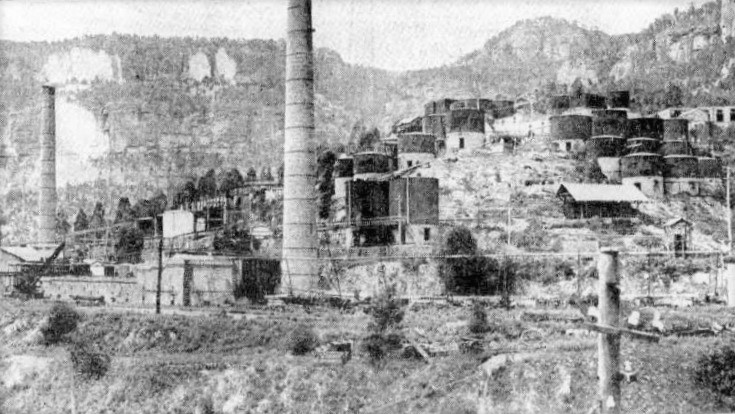
Remnants of the shale oil works at Newnes, c.1931

In 1928, four years after the closure of the oil shale mine and shale oil works at Newnes in New South Wales, its last mortgagee owner, John Fell, was reported as declaring, "I tried hard enough to succeed, and if anyone thinks they can do so they are welcome to try", and that, "Newnes is as dead as Julius Caesar". Fell built a new oil refinery at Clyde, in Sydney, in 1925, and reused some material and equipment, from Newnes and Torbane, in its construction.

In July 1930, Fell sold Commonwealth Oil Corporation's assets at Newnes, the refinery and the railway, to the companies in the consortium of the Broken Hill Associated Smelters. The new owners set up a company, Shale Oil Investigations Proprietary Limited, and expended around £6,000. That attempted revival came to nothing, after a decision of the new owners to abandon the project, in January 1931.

=== W.L. Baillieu bows out (1932 - 1936) ===
In 1932, W.L. Baillieu's mental health had collapsed. Beset by symptoms described as "physical restlessness, loss of memory, uncharacteristic indecision, and irrational fears — including a belief that he was insolvent", he was unable to work. He retired from most of his roles. By the time of his death, in England in 1936, Baillieu was no longer a force within Collins House. His son Clive Baillieu became a director of Zinc Corporation.

=== New Broken Hill Consolidated (1936) ===
In mid 1936, Zinc Corporation established a new company, New Broken Hill Consolidated Limited, by the financial reconstruction of another entity known as Barrier South. The new company acquired the southern blocks leases from Zinc Corporation.

=== Associated Paper and Pulp Mills ===
Amalgamated Zinc was wound up in 1938, once APPM was established.

== Second World War ==
H.V. Evatt (second from left), in London, c.1941.W.S.Robinson is on the right.

By the outbreak of the Second World War, in 1939, the Collins House companies were better placed than they had been at the outbreak of the First World War. Australia had been selling significant amounts of zinc and lead to Asian customers. Japan became an enemy in December 1941, and Japanese submarines entered coastal waters and the seas lying between Australia and her allies.

=== Collins House and the war effort ===
The government set up the Commonwealth Minerals Committee, and Colin Fraser and Lindesay Clark became committee members.

In 1944, W.S. Robinson, took a house in Red Hill in Canberra, where he stayed while he acted as a wartime adviser to the Curtin government.

=== Second consolidation of the Broken Hill mines (1940 - 1943) ===
In 1930, the Broken Hill Proprietary Mine closed. It reopened in 1936, but closed again in 1939. By then, its owner, BHP. was the operator of two steelworks; its own at Newcastle and the one that it acquired by the merger with Australian Iron & Steel, in 1935, at Port Kembla. It was also in the process of planning a third, the Whyalla Steelworks. BHP was leaving Broken Hill behind and that circumstance, and other mine closures, triggered a second consolidation of the remaining mineral deposits at Broken Hill.

North Broken Hill took over the Block 14 mine, in 1942. Broken Hill South purchased the worked out leases of the Sulphide Corporation, in 1940, and the leases of the Block 10 and BHP companies, in 1943. After that, virtually all the Broken Hill mining field was controlled by Collins House companies.

Zinc Corporation would later purchase the remaining assets of the Sulphide Corporation, in 1948.

== After the War ==
=== Politics ===
After the end of the war, with the triumph of the Soviet Union in Eastern Europe and the beginnings of the Cold War, there was an upsurge in socialist and Communist activity in Australia. The Collins House Group was a frequent subject of left-wing and Communist-controlled newspapers.

In 1944, The Australian Worker, reported a parliamentary debate, in which Arthur Caldwell had labelled Robert Menzies as a ventriloquist's doll for Collins House. The newspaper, Labor Call, invoked the name of Collins House in relation to the funding of the Liberal Party of Australia, in 1946. Tribune opined in 1948, "the real rulers of Australia today are the Wealthy Men of Collins House. Twenty men, sitting inside that building, dictating to millions of ordinary Australians — it sounds too fantastic to be true. But when twenty men have the control of iron and steel, base metals, banks, newspapers, radio, coal, gas, chemicals, beer, textiles, rubber, glass, insurance, trustees, pastoral firms and a few odd things like real estate and felt hats thrown in — then there is no fantasy about it. These men own Australia, they own you and me." In 1949, The Workers' Star, accused Collins House of being behind the distribution of "vicious red-bating comics" to children. In 1961, Tribune still included Collins House among the ranks of 'monopoly capitalists'.

In 1949, Robert Menzies attempted to ban the Communist Party of Australia, but he lost the Australian Communist Party ban referendum, in 1951. Left-wing advocates, for the 'No' case, attacked the influence of Collins House over the Menzies government and the 'Yes' case.

Paradoxically, as Collins House became the centrepiece of such criticism by left wing opponents of capitalism, the informal alliance of Collins House companies was itself beginning to decline.

== Demise of the Collins House Group ==
=== Changes (1944 - 1949) ===
Collaboration within the Collins House Group companies declined, after its heyday of the 1930s, dependent as it was on close personal working relationships of its founders. Key personalities of the informal Collins House alliance retired or had already died.

After 1932, W.S. Robinson and—especially so—Colin Fraser became the dominant personalities in the group. Colin Fraser died in 1944, aged 69, and by then W.S. Robinson was also in his late 60s.

The individual companies of the Collins House alliance, in the absence of their founders' harmonious working relationships, began to operate increasingly to their own priorities. Production from the old North and South Broken Hill mines was eclipsed by that from Zinc Corporation's newer mine, the New Broken Hill Consolidated, altering the relative balance between the three surviving original companies of the group.

In 1949, the board of Zinc Corporation was still dominated by people from families with a strong connection to Collins House; Robinson, Govett and Bailieu. However, even the second generation of the original CHG families were nearing the end of their working lives. It would be the then dominant Zinc Corporation, which would be first to separate from Collins House.

=== Consolidated Zinc (1949 - 1961) ===
In 1949, Zinc Corporation merged, with a downstream zinc processor—another CHG associate—Imperial Smelting Corporation, both becoming subsidiaries of the new Consolidated Zinc Corporation Limited. In 1950, the Imperial plant at Avonmouth started using an efficient smelting technique,known as the Imperial process. It could produce both lead and zinc metal, and allowed the recovery of such copper that may be present, as a dross.

In 1951, the newly-merged Zinc Corporation moved its Australian headquarters to another location, 95 Collins Street. The move is generally regarded as the end of the Collins House Group, but the individual companies still existed. Having achieved the merger, W.S. Robinson retired, in 1952; he had been the last of the founders of the original Collins House companies still working.

=== Changes in domicile (1961 and 1971) ===
Collins House companies that were registered in the United Kingdom changed their domicile to the State of Victoria; Zinc Corporation, by the Zinc Corporation, Limited Act 1961 (No. 6800 (Vic)) and the Zinc Corporation Act 1962 (10 & 11 Eliz. 2. c. vi (UK)) and New Broken Hill Consolidated Limited, by the New Broken Hill Consolidated Limited Act 1971 (No. 8110 (Vic)) and the New Broken Hill Consolidated Limited Act 1971 (c. xxvi (UK)).

=== Conzinc Rio Tinto (1962) ===
Consolidated Zinc had built up substantial financial resources, but failed to develop suitable new mining projects. The Rio Tinto Company was in a complementary position, having substantial development opportunities, but not enough financial resources. The merger of the two companies, in 1962, effectively took Consolidated Zinc completely out of the Collins House orbit. The main subsidiary of the merged entity, Conzinc Rio Tinto of Australia (CRA), would eventually become Rio Tinto.

=== Later years of Broken Hill South (1950 - 1980) ===
Broken Hill South reopened the Conrad mine at Howell—a complex ore body containing silver, lead, zinc, tin, arsenic, and copper ores, with some gold—but its life was short (from 1953 to the end of 1958), due to low metal prices. In the late 1950s, Broken Hill South attempted to revive copper mining in the Cobar region, with mixed success, using its subsidiary Cobar Mines Proprietary Limited. Its exploration of the old Great Cobar mine had no commercial outcomes, but, in 1966, many years of previous work resulted in the reopening of the long-dormant CSA Mine.

In 1972, the Broken Hill South operations in Broken Hill closed. Other companies have since worked its former leases.

=== End of Broken Hill South (1980 - 1983) ===
In 1980, Broken Hill South Limited (BHS) was taken over by another CHG company, Western Mining Corporation (WMC), with CTB Nominees (an affiliate of Commonwealth Bank) holding a 16 per cent stake and small shareholders 4 per cent. WMC then sold some of the BHS assets to CRA, in exchange for CRA shares. The remainder of the BHS assets—those not wanted by WMC—were liquidated in 1983.

=== Associated Pulp and Paper Manufacturers (1983 - 1993) ===
The company had been established with its shareholders including a number of Collins House companies—Broken Hill South Ltd., Electrolytic Zinc Co. of Australasia Ltd., North Broken Hill Ltd., and Zinc Corporation Ltd—and Australian Glass Manufacturers. In February 1983, it was successfully taken over by North Prospecting Pty Ltd., a subsidiary of North Broken Hill Holdings. In 1993, the company was sold to Amcor. The large paper mill at Burnie closed in 2010.

=== Electrolytic Smelting & Refining (1965 - 1995) ===
After 1947, ER & S was jointly owned by Broken Hill South and North Broken Hill. In 1965, Mount Lyell closed its refinery, and once again began shipping concentrates to ER & S at Port Kembla. The plant also took concentrates from the reopened CSA Mine near Cobar. Ownership changes in other CHG companies left ER & S within the CRA group. CRA sought partners for the venture. In 1990, Furukawa bought 30% and Nissho-Iwai 10%, and the company became known as Southern Copper. Although new investment was made, persistent environmental problems and other issues affecting profitability—it was only one third the size of the Mount Isa Mines smelter—resulted in the Port Kembla plant closing in 1995.

=== Consolidation of lead-zinc operations and Pasminco (1984 - 2002) ===
In 1984, Electrolytic Zinc was taken over by another CHG company, North Broken Hill. In 1988, Conzinc Rio Tinto (CRA), North Broken Hill and Peko-Wallsend, merged their lead-zinc mining and smelting operations into a new company Pasminco. Since CRA and North Broken Hill owned BHAS jointly, the BHAS smelter at Port Pirie too became part of Pasminco, as did another smelter, Cockle Creek Smelter. Since North Broken Hill owned Electrolytic Zinc, Pasminco also received the Risdon zinc works, in Tasmania. The Avonmouth zinc smelter in the UK also became one of Pasminco's assets. It sold the Avonmouth smelter to MIM, in 1993.

Pasminco took on large amounts of debt—to acquire and develop the Century Mine and in taking over of Savage Resources—but afterwards faced falling metal prices and poor hedging outcomes. In 2001, it entered voluntary liquidation, leaving only a tax loss for its shareholders. After the remediation of the Cockle Creek site was completed, Pasminco's creditors received 22 cents in the dollar, in 2014.

In March 2002, Pasminco's Broken Hill mining operations were sold to Perilya Limited, which itself was taken over by Chinese interests, in 2013, and delisted. The Port Pyrie smelter—for a time the largest lead smelter in the world—and the Risdon zinc works subsequently passed first to Ziniflex and then to Nyrstar.

=== Western Mining Corporation - growth, diversification, and Olympic Dam (1952-1993) ===
Western Mining Corporation had been exclusively a gold mining company. However, from the 1960s, WMC became a diversified mining company, in its own right, under its chairman, from 1952 to 1974, Lindesay Clark. While continuing to mine gold, WMC expanded its operations into nickel mining, smelting, refining, marketing and exploration, aluminium, base metals exploration, talc, and uranium, oil and natural gas exploration.

In 1975, WMC discovered the large polymetallic deposit known as Olympic Dam. and In 1993, it bought bought BP's 49% share and took total control of the mining project.

=== North Limited ===
North Limited evolved from North Broken Hill, after its merger with Peko-Wallsend. in 1988. By 2000, while North was a widely diversified resource company, iron ore assets represented 44% of its value and investing to begin production at the new West Angelas iron ore mine iron in the Pilbara was the company's major focus. However funding had also been committed to increase production at the Iron Ore Company of Canada and the Northparkes copper and gold mine.

=== End of the remaining Collins House companies (2000 - 2002) ===
North Limited was taken over by Rio Tinto, in 2000—after a protracted on-market takeover dual, with Anglo-American. That left only Western Mining Corporation of the main companies of the former Collins House Group. Like North, Western Mining developed into a large diversified resources company but had a focus on one major asset, the Olympic Dam copper, gold and uranium deposit.

A 2002 article in the Australian Financial Review viewed the sale, to BHP, of WMC Resources—the final form of Western Mining Corporation—in that year, as constituting the final end of the Collins House Group, and marking "the end of a key chapter in Australia's corporate history".

=== Tidying up the paperwork ===
Minerals Separation was finally dissolved, as an inactive company in the UK, in March 2021. Broken Hill Associated Smelters Proprietary Limited was compulsorily deregistered, in June 2024.

== Legacy ==
The smelters at Port Pirie and the zinc works at Risdon, are still in operation, in 2026, both operated by Nyrstar. Mining of lead-zinc ore continues at Broken Hill, albeit by others, after over 140 years. Production continues at the Olympic Dam mine, now owned by BHP. The CSA mine. near Cobar, that was reopened by Broken Hill South, still operates under newer owners, as does the NorthParkes mine, once owned by North.

The large Rio Tinto mining house includes parts of the old Collins House companies. It includes iron ore mining leases originally held by North Limited, once know as the Robe River deposits.

The Collins House Group and its connected companies diverted some of the wealth obtained from mining toward large investments in Australian manufacturing; although most of that legacy is now lost, manufacturing was an important factor in the economy of 20th Century Australia.

The stockbroker E.L & C. Bailieu survived, until 2020, when it was sold to another broker.

Otherwise, the Collins House Group companies are just a part of Australia's mining and industrial history.

== Sources ==
- Richardson, Peter (1987). "The Origins and Development of the Collins House Group, 1915-1951". Australian Economic History Review. 27 (1): 3–29. doi:10.1111/aehr.271001.
- Ralph, Gilbert (2004). "The Broken Hill – Collins House Connection: Mining Personalities" (PDF). Journal of Australasian Mining History. 2: 198–221.
