= Consolidated Zinc =

Consolidated Zinc was an Australian mining company from 1905 to 1962. It was one of the informal alliance of companies that was known as the Collins House Group.

== History ==
The company's initial operations focused on extracting zinc from mine tailings of the Broken Hill Ore Deposit in Broken Hill, New South Wales, Australia. The company was founded in Melbourne on 9 September 1905 as the Zinc Corporation Limited, to exploit residual zinc concentrations with an estimated value of $12 million in the six million tons of mine tailings deposited from mining activities over the previous 20 years. Key figures involved in the effort included William Baillieu and William Sydney Robinson. Also involved was future President of the United States, then a mining engineer working for Bewick, Moreing and Company, Herbert Hoover, who inspected the tailing dumps in the group's investigations prior to formation of the company. Other investors in the new company were Clark & Robinson (William Clark, Lionel Robinson and Company) and Arthur Terrell.

They established concentrating mills at Broken Hill in 1905 and 1910, and in 1906 an associated sulphuric acid manufacturing plant whose first manager was Herbert Gepp.

In 1911 they expanded into primary mining activities with the purchase of Broken Hill South Blocks, constructing underground mines and mining for zinc, lead, silver and gold in the Broken Hill area.

In 1949, Zinc Corporation merged with the Imperial Smelting Corporation to become Consolidated Zinc. In 1953, Haddon King became chief geologist.

Over time, the company built up substantial financial resources but failed to develop suitable new mining projects. This led to a merger in 1962 with the Rio Tinto Company, a company who found itself in a complementary position of having substantial development opportunities but not enough financial resources with which to pursue them. The resulting company, known as The Rio Tinto – Zinc Corporation, and its main subsidiary, Conzinc Riotinto of Australia, would eventually become today's Rio Tinto.
