= Colin Fraser (mining) =

New Zealand mining engineer and executive

Sir Colin Fraser (14 May 1875 – 11 March 1944) was a mining engineer and executive in New Zealand and Australia.

== History ==
Fraser was born in Coromandel, New Zealand, a son of mine manager John Cameron Fraser and his wife Elizabeth Stuart Fraser, née McKay. He studied geology part-time at Auckland University while on the staff of the Bank of New Zealand, graduated M.Sc in 1906 and entered the service of the N.Z. Government as mining geologist 1905–1911.

He was associated with William Sydney Robinson in London as an employee of Robinson, Clark & Co, consulting mining engineers 1911–1914, when he was involved in tin mines in Cornwall and nickel mines in Canada.

He next took a commission from the Mount Morgan Gold Mining Co. to make a geological examination of some of its properties in Australia. He was next associated with W. L. Baillieu in developing Broken Hill's non-ferrous production capability for wartime needs. He was appointed to the Advisory Panel on Industrial Organisation and served as Director of Materials Supply in the Munitions Department, and as chairman of the Commonwealth Minerals Committee.

As joint managing director (with W. L. Baillieu? W. S. Robinson?) from 1915, then chairman, of Broken Hill Associated Smelters (founded by Baillieu and Robinson) he was largely responsible for the expansion of that company's works in Port Pirie, South Australia. He was also involved in the establishment of the electrolytic zinc refinery at Risdon, Tasmania.

He served on the boards of many prominent Australian businesses, including:

- Associated Pulp and Paper Mills
- Australia Aluminium Co.
- Australian Fertilisers Pty Ltd (NSW and Vic)
- Austral Bronze Co Ltd (NSW)
- British Australian Lead Manufacturers Pty Ltd (NSW)
- Broken Hill South (chairman)
- Central Norseman mining
- Commercial Union Assurance Co Ltd (UK)
- Commonwealth Aircraft Corporation
- Dunlop Rubber (Vic and NSW)
- Electrolytic Refining and Smelting Co Ltd (NSW)
- Gold Mines of Australia (Vic and Qld)
- Imperial Smelting Corporation Ltd (UK)
- Metal Manufacturers Pty Ltd (NSW)
- Mount Coolon Gold Mines (Qld)
- New Broken Hill Consolidated
- North Broken Hill
- Taranaki Oilfields (managing director)
- Triton mining
- Victoria Gold Dredging Co.
- Western Gold Mines (WA)
- Western Mining Corporation Ltd (WA)
- Western NSW Electric Power Pty Ltd
- Zinc Corporation Ltd (NSW and UK)

Fraser was a council member, Australasian Institute of Mining and Metallurgy for 25 years, and president in 1923.

He was a member of, and for seven years Australia delegate to the (British) Institution of Mining and Metallurgy

He was fifteen years a board member of the Australian Mines and Metals Association and president from 1932 for 12 years.

He was a member of the Melbourne Club, Australian Club and Athenaeum Club of Melbourne and the Union Club of Sydney.

He was knighted in 1935.

He died at his home "Whernside", Albany Road, in Toorak, Victoria after a short illness, survived by Lady Fraser and two daughters. His remains were cremated at the Spring Vale Cemetery.

Following his death Andrew Fairweather was appointed to the board of Broken Hill South.

== Family ==
Colin Fraser married Canadian Mary Helen MacNamara on 20 March 1913 in London and settled in Melbourne. They had two daughters:

- daughter (3 October 1916 – )
- Dorothy Jean Stewart Fraser (26 January 1921 – 22 November 1984)
