= W. E. Wainwright =

William Edward Wainwright (3 January 1873 – 3 May 1959), commonly referred to as W. E. Wainwright, was a mine manager in Broken Hill, New South Wales, Australia.

== History ==
Wainwright was born in London, the son of schoolmaster Edward Harley Wainwright ( – 26 April 1919), and his wife Maria Wainwright, née Brooks. In 1879 they left for Adelaide where E. H. Wainwright had accepted a position as Third Master of Prince Alfred College.

In 1883 he left "Princes" for rival St Peter's College as a replacement for Science master A. H. Highton. His decision to change schools may have been related to his religion: Wainwright was an Anglican. He served at St Peter's for 22 years, resigning in 1906.

Wainwright was educated by private tuition and was successful in the 1888 University examinations. He enrolled with the School of Mines in 1890, achieving excellent grades in the first year but missing a continuing scholarship through a change in criteria relating to technical drawing. He graduated with an Associate Diploma in 1892; with Charles John Whillas (1874–1945) the second and third to gain this recognition (Wainwright's was in Metallurgy; Whillas and (in the previous year) L. W. Grayson's being in Mining). In 1894 his paper on mining theory was given a pass mark by examiner Captain H. R. Hancock of Kadina giving him that second Diploma. That same year Wainwright was appointed assistant manager of the Ivanhoe gold mine, Kalgoorlie, Western Australia, where he was in charge of the battery, which he held for two years before taking a similar position at the newly established Queen Margaret mine, Coolgardie.

In 1898, he joined the Broken Hill South company and was put in charge of the metallurgical department in 1900, and effected an immediate increase in the percentage of valuable metal extracted. He had been appointed surface manager only a few months when a serious rockfall below the 500 ft level killed six men and left others trapped. With the resignation of underground manager Samuel Mayne (c. 1855–1933) in 1903, Wainwright was made general manager of the mine and of the company in 1918.

In July 1920, Wainwright was transferred to the company's head office in Melbourne, and retired on 30 June 1937. Andrew Fairweather (1882–1962) succeeded him on both occasions.

He died at his home in Caulfield, Victoria and his remains were cremated.

== Other activities ==
- Wainwright was hon. secretary. Broken Hill Mining Managers' Association 1906–1915.
- Wainwright was vice-president of Australasian Institute of Mining & Metallurgy 1916–18 and elected president in 1919 and again in 1930. He led the Australia delegation to the 1930 Empire Mining Congress in 1930. He served as vice-president again in 1916–18, 1933, 1934 and received that body's Mines Medal in 1937.

== Family ==
Edward Harley Wainwright (4 March 1841 – 26 April 1919) married Maria? Marian? Brooks ( – ) in England, left for Adelaide 1879, taught at Prince Alfred College, St Peter's College. Elected 1883 to the Royal Society (SA branch).

- William Edward Wainwright (1873–1959), subject of this article, married Emily Constance Goode (1873 – 22 August 1953), daughter of Henry Abel Goode on 27 October 1900. their two daughters and three sons included:

- daughter (19 August 1901 – )
- John Harley Wainwright (1911– )
- William Harley Wainwright ( – 21 January 1977) He was head metallurgist, BHP and life member, Australasian Institute of Mining and Metallurgy. He retired to Victor Harbor, where he died.

- Florence Wainwright ( –1963) married John George Kelly (1859–1947) eldest son of Dr. Alexander Charles Kelly (1811–1877). of Tintara fame, on 5 November 1907
- Charles Leonard Wainwright ( 1879 – ) married Gladys Kirk Thomlinson/Tomlinson ( – ) on 4 June 1912 in Seaton Carew. He was assistant manager of the Sulphide Corporation works in that town.
- Cpl. Edward Harley Wainwright (15 November 1881 – 26 January 1918) studied Electrical Engineering at the School of Mines, died while doing war work at Vickers Ltd, Crayford, UK

Charles Wainwright (1846 – 31 March 1903) married Annie Brooke (c. 1849 – 12 February 1881) in England and emigrated to Australia, possibly on the same ship as his brother. He married again, to Emma Brook ( – 4 October 1924) (both of Kidderminster, England) on 6 January 1888. He joined Education Department in 1879, was headmaster of public (State) schools Narracoorte, Eudunda, and Murray Bridge.

- John William Wainwright (27 November 1880 – 1948)
- Annie Wainwright (1889 – )
