= North Limited =

Former Australian mining and resources company

- Traded as: ASX: NBH
- Industry: Mining
- Founded: 1888
- Defunct: 30 August 2000
- Fate: Acquired by Rio Tinto
- Headquarters: Melbourne, Australia
- Key people: Malcolm Broomhead (CEO)
- Products: iron ore, lead, zinc, silver, uranium, wood fibre, copper, gold
- Website: www.north.com.au

North Limited was a diversified mining and resources company. Although based in Australia, its operations eventually extended to six continents. By the late 20th century the company had become the fourth largest iron ore exporter in the world with expansion underway which would have made it equal third. Its biggest asset was a majority stake in Robe River, a major miner of the Pilbara iron ore deposits of Western Australia and the world's lowest cost producer of iron ore.

== History ==
The company was formed in 1888 as North Broken Hill Silver Mining to exploit the rich silver, lead and zinc deposits at Broken Hill in western New South Wales, the name was shortened to North Broken Hill in 1905. Production at the original North Broken Hill mine wound down and it finally closed in 1993.

It was one of the informal alliance of companies that was known as the Collins House Group.

However over the years the company had diversified into other mining provinces. In 1988 they took over Peko-Wallsend, changing its name to North Broken Hill Peko Limited, then North Limited in 1994. At Broken Hill the company had been known as 'North' to distinguish it from other miners in the area such as Broken Hill South and The Broken Hill Proprietary. The nickname continued long after the company's focus had moved away from Broken Hill, so the new name just formalized what the company had always been known as.

By 2000, while North was a widely diversified resource company, iron ore assets represented 44% of its value and investing to begin production at the new West Angelas iron ore mine in the Pilbara was the company's major focus. However money had also been committed to increase production at the Iron Ore Company of Canada and the Northparkes copper and gold mine..

== Takeover ==
Like its peer Western Mining, North developed into a large diversified resources company with a focus on one major asset. In the case of Western Mining it was the Olympic Dam copper, gold and uranium deposit, for North it was Robe River Iron.

In 2000 a bidding war for North broke out when Rio Tinto launched a hostile takeover at $3.80 a share. This was topped by an Anglo American bid of $4.20, Rio Tinto responded with a successful offer of $4.75 per share. The company was delisted and after the takeover, Rio Tinto integrated most of North's assets into its own operations, but sold others such as the Northparkes.

== Assets ==
In 2000 when it was taken over, North's major assets were:

- Robe River Iron Associates. A large, low cost iron ore miner in the Pilbara, Western Australia, 53% interest
- Iron Ore Company of Canada, an iron ore miner in Labrador, 56.1% interest
- Zinkgruvan, a zinc miner in Sweden, 100% ownership
- Energy Resources of Australia, a uranium producer in the Northern Territory, 68.4% interest
- Northparkes copper and gold mine in New South Wales, 80% interest
- Bajo de la Alumbrera mine a large copper and gold producer in Argentina, 25% interest
- North Forest Products. Tasmanian producer of plantation woodchips (3.3. million tons annually, and 43% of Australian exports) 100% ownership
- Golden Valley Joint Venture, Kanowna Belle Gold Mine, 50% interest
- Peak Hill Joint Venture gold mine, 33.33% interest
- The company was also exploring resource deposits in Australia, Indonesia, Ivory Coast, Peru, Mexico and the United States

Previously North had owned many mines and companies. Some of them were:

- North Broken Hill silver lead and zinc mine
- Warman slurry pumps
- Former Peko zinc assets, mostly those acquired from EZ Industries, Tasmania that were merged with Rio Tinto assets and spun off to form Pasminco in 1988
- Emu Bay Railway on the West Coast of Tasmania
