= Andrew Fairweather =

Australian mine manager in NSW

Andrew Fairweather (31 May 1882 – 4 May 1962) was an Australian mine manager in Broken Hill, New South Wales.

== History ==
Fairweather was born in Adelaide, son of marine engineer Andrew Abercrombie Fairweather (1855–1940) and his wife Cecilia Russell Fairweather née Leason (1851–1895), who married in 1879.

James Leason (c. 1821 – 29 July 1908) arrived in SA aboard Trafalgar March 1850 with daughters Clara and Emma, wife Emma and new baby having died en route. Leason then married Cecilia Wilson (c. 1823 – 10 March 1910), had another ten children; Cecilia Russell Leason being the first. Leason took over "St James farm" at The Reedbeds in 1859 and prospered. He moved to Lillimur, Victoria (near Kaniva) in October 1877.

Fairweather was educated at LeFevre's Peninsula Primary School and Port Adelaide High School, winning a scholarship in December 1895 which took him to Way College in 1896, from which institution he gained an entrance scholarship to Adelaide University, graduating BSc in 1901. He had his first experience in a working mine was underground at the Broken Hill Central mine, operated by the Sulphide Corporation, then in July 1904 was appointed to the underground technical staff of the Broken Hill South mine, eventually becoming underground superintendent. When general manager W. E. Wainwright moved to Melbourne in March 1920, Fairweather took over his responsibilities as mine superintendent. In 1932, he notoriously predicted the imminent exhaustion of the Broken Hill deposits and refused to waste shareholders' money on further exploration. In 1937, he succeeded Wainwright as general manager of Broken Hill South Ltd, and retired to the family home, Prescott Terrace, Rose Park, South Australia in 1944.

He was president of the Broken Hill Mine Managers' Association from 1935 to his retirement in 1944.

He was a longtime member of the Australasian Institute of Mining & Metallurgy and elected its president in 1932. In 1945, he was awarded its bronze medal.

He was a faithful servant of the company, but respected by workers and the Unions for his honest dealing with the men and concern for their welfare.

== Other activities ==
Fairweather served as director of

- Broken Hill South Ltd 1944 following the death of Sir Colin Fraser (c. 1874 – 11 March 1944).
- Electrolytic Zinc Co. of Australasia Ltd from 1947
- Electrolytic Refining & Smelting Co. of Australia Pty Ltd from 1946
- Western New South Wales Electric Power Pty Ltd from 1944

He relinquished each of these positions in 1954

== Family ==
Frederick Fairweather (7 December 1826 – 27 May 1906) married Mary Abercrombie (6 July 1818 – 1899) in Ireland in 1851, emigrated to South Australia aboard Woodstock, arrived July 1851.

- Frederick James Fairweather (26 July 1852 – 22 April 1938) married Rebecca Rachel Ingram (1849 – 14 September 1886) on 24 February 1875. He married again, to Cordelia Caroline Oates Gribbin ( – c. 18 May 1948) on 18 November 1886

- James Cromwell Fairweather (1891–1968) married Nellie Milton Byrne on 19 November 1913, separated 1933, divorced 1942

- Charles Alexander Fairweather (1854 – August 1943) married Ellen Jewell ( – ) on 24 March 1882
- Andrew Abercrombie Fairweather (1855 – 11 September 1940) married Cecilia Russell Leason (1851 – 15 March 1895) on 22 February 1879. He married again, in 1896, to Alice Louisa Kelly (c. 1856 – 7 March 1941)

- Cecilia Wilson Fairweather (1879– ) married William Stanway in 1899
- Horace Abercrombie Fairweather (1881–1969) married Hilda Marian Vardon (1886–1959) on 12 April 1911. Hilda was only daughter of Joseph Vardon.

- Hugh Vardon Fairweather (1912– ) married Gladys "Glad" Gall (1915– ) on 1 July 1939

- Andrew Fairweather (31 May 1882 – 4 May 1962) married Emily Edna Symes (1880–1966) in 1907. Tgeir children include:

- Edna May Fairweather (1911–1992) married Kenneth Symes Porter (1910– ) on 16 January 1937
- Frank Lancelot Fairweather (1918– ) married Ruby Myrtle Jolly (1917–2004) on 31 October 1942

- Mary Phyllis Fairweather (1886– ) married Spencer John Moore ( – ) in 1920

- Mary Fairweather (15 December 1856 – ) married William Milroy Crawford ( – ) in 1882
- James Isaac Fairweather (1858–1944) married Lavinia Rosetta Sellar ( –1913) in 1890
- Ellen Angel Fairweather (1860– ) married William Milroy McGill ( – ) in 1889
- Francis Fairweather (1861– ) married Mary Jones ( – ) in 1892
