= William Sydney Robinson =

Australian businessman, industrialist, and diplomat

William Sydney Robinson FAA (1876–1963), was an Australian businessman, industrialist, and diplomat. He founded Western Mining Corporation in Australia in 1933.

He was an admirer of Winston Churchill.

== See also ==
- Collins House Group
