= Gibraltar Hill =

Gibraltar Hill may refer to:

- One of five hills and mountains in Australia:
  - Gibraltar Hill (Bungendore, New South Wales)
  - Gibraltar Hill (Williamsdale, New South Wales)
  - Gibraltar Peak (Canberra), located within the Tidbinbilla Nature Reserve in the Australian Capital Territory
  - Gibralter Hill, located near Grahamstown, New South Wales
  - Mount Gibraltar, located between Bowral and Mittagong, New South Wales
- A peak located in Antarctica
  - Gibraltar Peak

== See also ==
- Gibraltar
