= Robert Amos (contractor) =

Construction contractor in New South Wales, Australia

Robert Amos (c.1832—1905) was a construction contractor in New South Wales, Australia. The contracts that he completed were for civil engineering works, especially railway lines and bridges. Most of his work was under contract to New South Wales Government Railways while under the management of Commissioner for Railways, Charles Goodchap, and Engineer-in-Charge, John Whitton. He was in partnership, under the name Railway Contractors, with his brother Alexander Amos and Alexander Kerr, until January 1875. From 1875 to September 1889, he was in partnership with his brother Alexander Amos, using the name A. and R. Amos, and thereafter he contracted on his own.

Based on his age at death, he was born around 1832. His parents were Alexander and Catherine Amos. He had an older sister, Janet, and an older brother Alexander.

It was Amos's brother Alexander Amos who began contracting in the 1850s, in Melbourne, mainly erecting public buildings and carrying out bridge and road works. The company moved its focus, around 1868, when an opportunity became available in New South Wales, construction of a part of the Main North railway line. Amos joined his brother and Alexander Kerr in a partnership for that work. Kerr had managed construction of the Lithgow Zig Zag, for the contractor Patrick Higgins, and later, as a contractor, would build the Main North line from Scone to Murrurundi and parts of the North Coast railway line.

After ending the partnership with Kerr, the two Amos brothers formed a partnership as A & R Amos, and carried out construction contracts on new railway lines between 1874 and 1889, after which the two brothers fell out over money and the partnership was terminated. He had fallen out with Alexander over money in 1889. Their partnership had never been formalized. Their dispute eventually went to arbitration, following which Robert Amos was awarded a payment.

== Works ==
=== Railway Contractors (Amos, Amos & Kerr) until 1874 ===
- Main North railway line, section from Muswellbrook to Scone

=== A. & R. Amos (Amos Brothers) - 1875-1889 ===
- Main Northern railway line, 'short North' sections from Homebush to Hawkesbury River, Hawkesbury River to Gosford, and Gosford to Waratah.
- Main Northern railway line, section from Tamworth to Uralla
- Main Southern railway line, sections from Yass to Cootamundra and Cootamundra to Wagga Wagga.
- Main Western railway line, section from Dubbo to Nyngan.
- Murrumbidgee river railway bridge, Wagga Wagga, erected iron bridge made by P. & W. McClellan & Co., Glasgow, and built wooden trestles.
- Breakwater and relocation (from Blackwattle Bay) and re-erection of first lifting bridge on Swansea Channel, the entrance to Lake Macquarie
- A large sawmill at Jordon's Crossing (now Bundanoon)
- Trachyte quarry on the western side of Mount Gibraltar at Bowral

=== Robert Amos - after 1889 ===
- Illawarra Harbour and Land Corporation, private railway
- Smelting Company of Australia, private railway to Dapto Smelting Works

== Death and family ==
Amos was living at 'Braeside', Victoria Street, Darlinghurst, when he died on 7 December 1905, aged 73, already a widower. He was buried in a private family cemetery on his property, at Cairn Hill, Bundanoon, with his wife. Nearby is the grave of his brother Alexander and his sister Janet. Amos Lane, Bundanoon, which runs to Cairn Hill, is named after him.

He was survived by two sons, Alexander and Robert, and at least two daughters. Two of his daughters married brothers named Anderson, and one, Jean Cairns Amos (1868—1928) became Lady Anderson when her husband, Robert Anderson (1865—1940), was knighted. She was an early female graduate of University of Sydney, (BA, 1890), an advocate for women's and children's welfare and women's education, and she held high office in the National Council of Women. Amos was also survived by his brother and former business partner, Alexander Amos (d.1915).
