= Woodlawn Wind Farm =

Wind farm in New South Wales, Australia

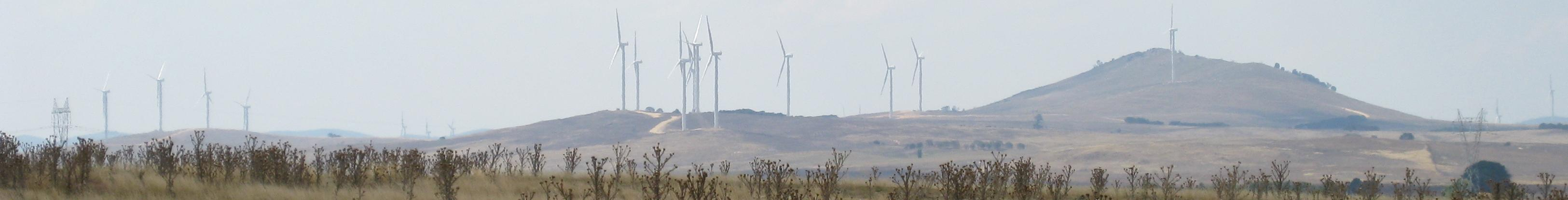
- Country: Australia
- Location: Near Bungendore, New South Wales
- Coordinates: 35.084°S 149.62°E
- Status: Operational
- Commission date: Late 2011
- Construction cost: A$115 million
- Owner: Infigen Energy
- Operator: Infigen Energy

Wind farm
- Type: Onshore
- Hub height: 80 metres (262 ft)
- Rotor diameter: 88 metres (289 ft)

Power generation
- Units operational: 23 × 2.1 MW
- Make and model: Suzlon Energy S88
- Nameplate capacity: 48.3 MW

External links
- Website: www.infigenenergy.com

The Woodlawn Wind Farm is a wind farm located near Bungendore, New South Wales. It is part of the Capital Renewable Energy Precinct, along with nearby Capital Wind Farm and the Woodlawn Bioreactor.

Woodlawn Wind Farm was owner and operator Infigen Energy's sixth Australian wind farm. It is a 48.3 megawatt wind farm with 23 turbines. The energy produced by the wind farm can power around 32,000 average Australian households per year, saving over 138,000 tonnes of greenhouse gas emissions per year.

== Location ==
The Woodlawn Wind Farm is near Tarago and Bungendore, adjacent to Capital Wind Farm.

== Timeline ==
The New South Wales Minister for Planning issued Conditions of Approval for the project on 4 October 2005.

Infigen announced it had issued a notice to proceed with the construction of the wind farm on 28 June 2010.

The wind farm achieved practical completion on 17 October 2011.

== Run with the Wind fun run ==
Run with the Wind is a community fun run amongst the wind turbines at the Woodlawn Wind Farm. Held every year on a Sunday morning sometime in October or November since 2012, the fun run is hosted as a wind farm open day by the owner-operator of the wind farm, Infigen Energy. Net proceeds from tickets sales go to the local community groups and volunteers.

Since 2013 the event runs two races: a 5 km and a 10 km race. In 2012, 2013 and 2014 the 10 km race was won by and Australian Olympian runner Martin Dent.

== Funding ==
To help fund the construction of the wind farm, Infigen Energy signed a A$55 million project finance debt facility agreement with Westpac. It is thought that this is the first project financing of a merchant wind farm in Australia.

The total project cost was A$115 million.

== See also ==
- Wind power in Australia
- List of wind farms in New South Wales
