= Gibralter Hill =

Hill in New South Wales, Australia

- Location within New South Wales

Highest point
- Elevation: 522 m (1,713 ft)
- Prominence: 17
- Coordinates: 35°16′34″S 148°03′24″E

Gibralter Hill (also known as Gibraltar Hill) is a hill near Grahamstown, New South Wales, Australia.

== Gold mining ==
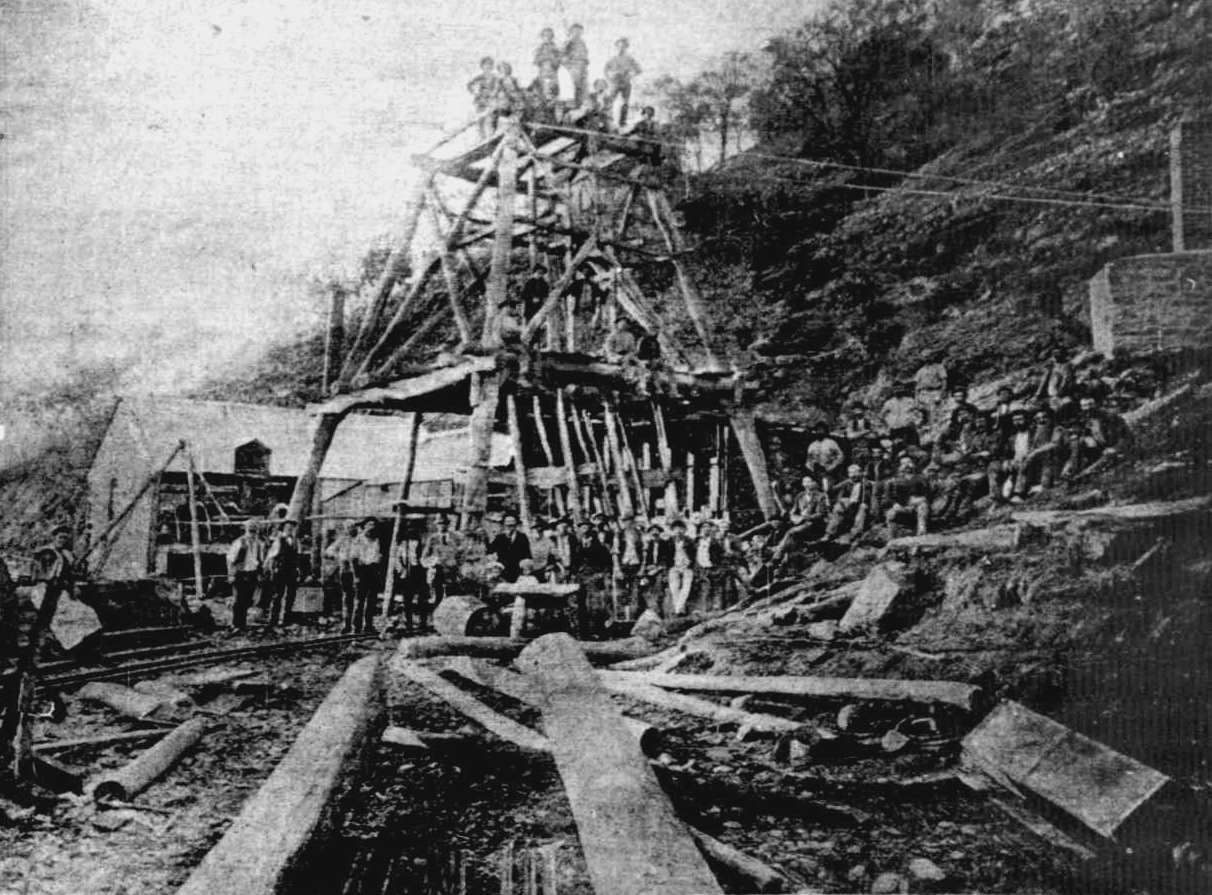
Gibraltar Mine, c.1897

In one week in April, 1864, almost 550 ounces of gold were mined from Gibralter Hill, a yield of more than 58 ounces per ton of ore. In 1893 the Gibraltar Gold Mining Company exhibited gold ore from the hill at the World's Columbian Exposition in Chicago yielding a net of 6 ounces of gold per ton.

In 1894 the Gibraltar Hill Company took 656 tons of ore from the hill, which yielded 2090 ounces of gold. In 1895 more than 1500 ounces of gold were mined from the hill by the Gibraltar Gold Mining Company; by this time the yield was still 5 ounces per ton of ore.

The mine was bought by English interests, with capital of £300,000, in 1896, and greatly expanded. £500,000 worth of gold was won before the grades declined and the company ceased mining, in 1901. The mine then continued to be worked, on a small scale, by tribute miners. The company resumed operations in December 1907, but the mine was closed by 1916.

== See also ==
- Gibraltar Hill (disambiguation)
- Mount Gibraltar
