= Gibraltar Hill (Williamsdale, New South Wales) =

- Location within New South Wales

Highest point
- Elevation: 1,129 m (3,704 ft)
- Coordinates: 35°33′54″S 149°10′04″E

Geography
- Location: Monaro region, New South Wales, Australia

Gibraltar Hill is a hill in the Monaro region, near Williamsdale in New South Wales, Australia.

== Murrumbidgee to Googong Water Transfer pipeline ==
The Murrumbidgee to Googong Water Transfer pipeline passes through the Gibraltar Range (also known as the Gibraltar Pass), south of Gibraltar Hill. Construction of the 13 km (8.1 mi) pipeline began in 2008 and was completed in 2012.

== See also ==
- Mount Gibraltar
- Gibraltar Hill (disambiguation)
