= Gibraltar Hill (Bungendore, New South Wales) =

Hill in New South Wales, Australia

- Location within New South Wales

Highest point
- Elevation: 887 m (2,910 ft)
- Coordinates: 35°15′54″S 149°29′04″E

Geography
- Location: Capital region, New South Wales, Australia

Gibraltar Hill is a hill in the Capital region near Bungendore in New South Wales, Australia.

== Location and characteristics ==
Gibraltar Hill is situated 3.8 kilometres (2.4 mi) east of Bungendore, New South Wales, Australia. The Capital Wind Farm at Bungendore is visible from the hill, and, according to Australian naval officer Stacey Porter, the view makes "a really nice outlook".

== History ==
In 1840, Jackey Jackey created a hide-out on the hill overlooking Bungendore.

The hill has an authority ID of NSW20217.

== Geology ==
The hill is oval in shape and is made of igneous rock. Granite mined from the hill was used in the construction of buildings in the town of Bungendore.

== See also ==
- Mount Gibraltar
- List of mountains of Australia § New South Wales
