= Butmaroo =

Butmaroo is a locality near Bungendore, New South Wales. Butmaroo Homestead was occupied by the early European colonists in the region and the name may have originated in the small endangered macropod Butmaroo which used to be common in the area.
