= Bungendore =

Town in New South Wales, Australia founded 1837

- Town
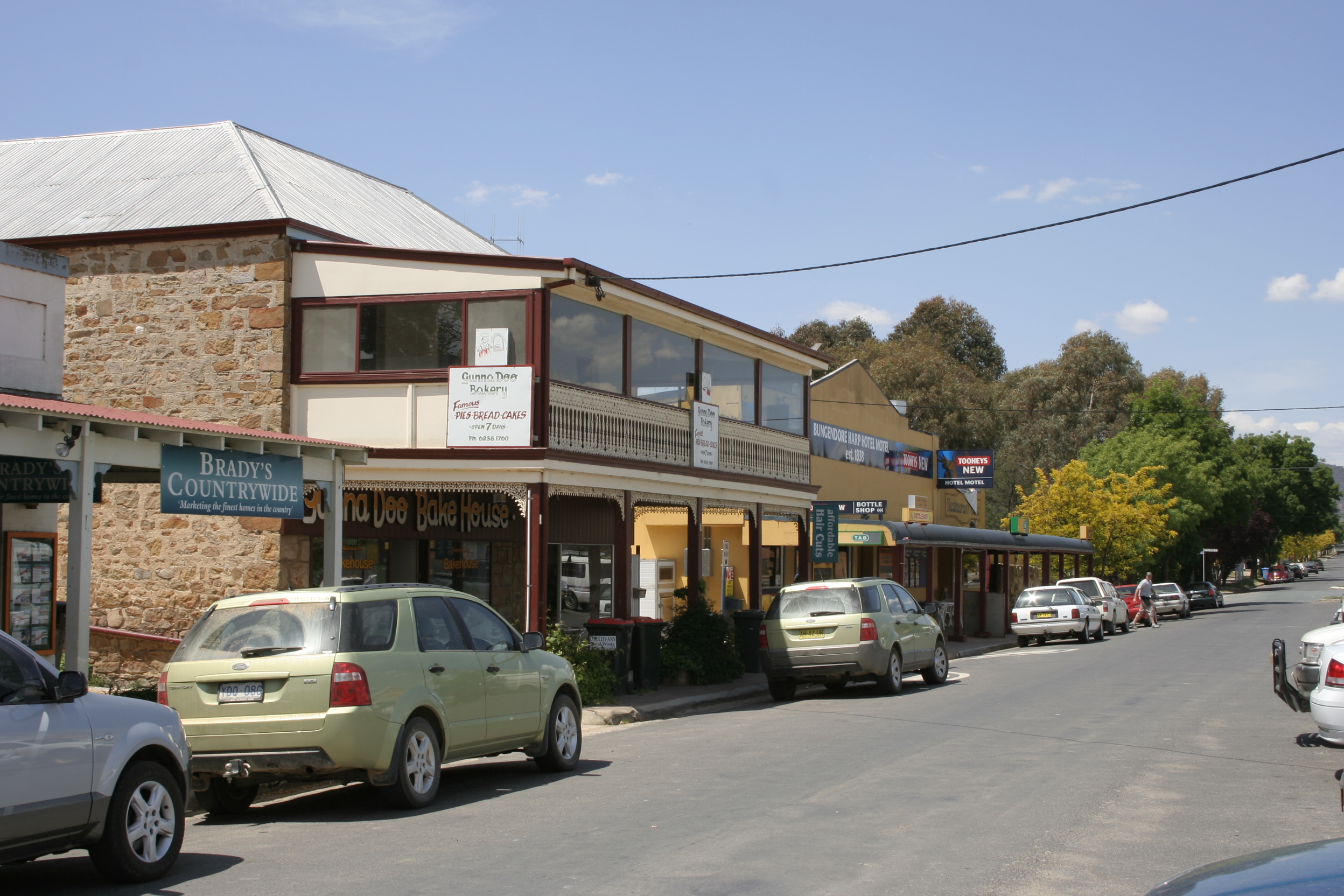
- Gibraltar Street

- Coordinates: 35°15′0″S 149°27′0″E
- Country: Australia
- State: New South Wales
- LGA: Queanbeyan-Palerang Regional Council
- Location: 38 km (24 mi) E of Canberra; 70 km (43 mi) SW of Goulburn; 26 km (16 mi) E of Queanbeyan; 112 km (70 mi) NW of Batemans Bay; 267 km (166 mi) SW of Sydney
- Established: 1837

Government
  - State electorate: Monaro
  - Federal division: Eden-Monaro
- Elevation: 700 m (2,300 ft)

Population
  - Total: 4,745 (2021 census)
- Postcode: 2621
- County: Murray
- Parish: Wamboin; Currandooly
- Mean max temp: 19.6 °C (67.3 °F)
- Mean min temp: 6.4 °C (43.5 °F)
- Annual rainfall: 622 mm (24.5 in)
Localities around Bungendore
Bywong	Lake George	Mount Fairy
Wamboin	Bungendore	Mulloon
Kowen	Hoskinstown	Palerang

Bungendore is a town in the Southern Tablelands Region of New South Wales, Australia, in Queanbeyan-Palerang Regional Council. It is on the Kings Highway near Lake George, the Molonglo River Valley and the Australian Capital Territory border. It has become a major tourist centre in recent years, popular with visitors from Canberra and some of it has heritage protection. It has expanded rapidly in recent years as a dormitory town of Canberra.

== History ==
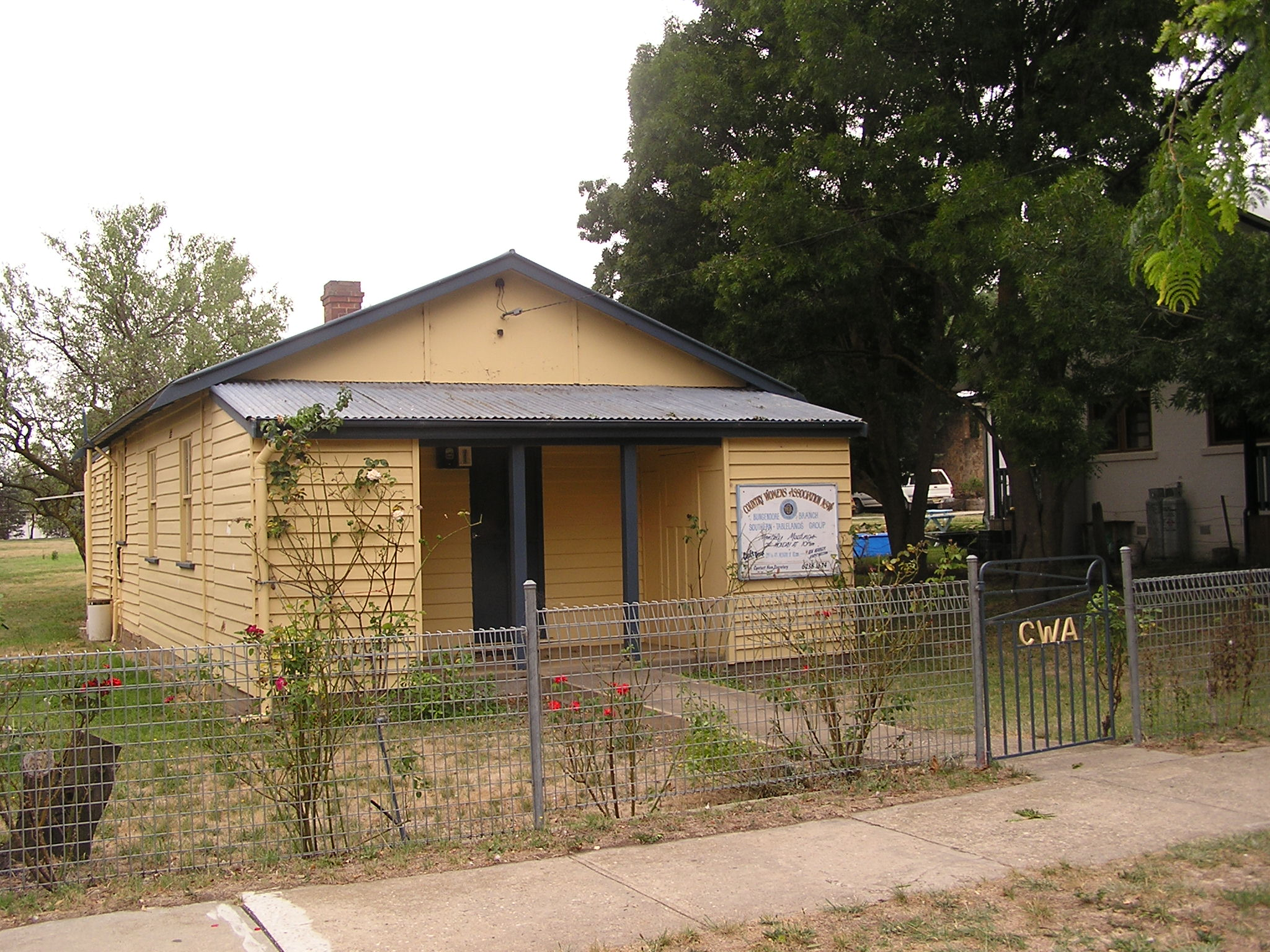
Country Women's Association

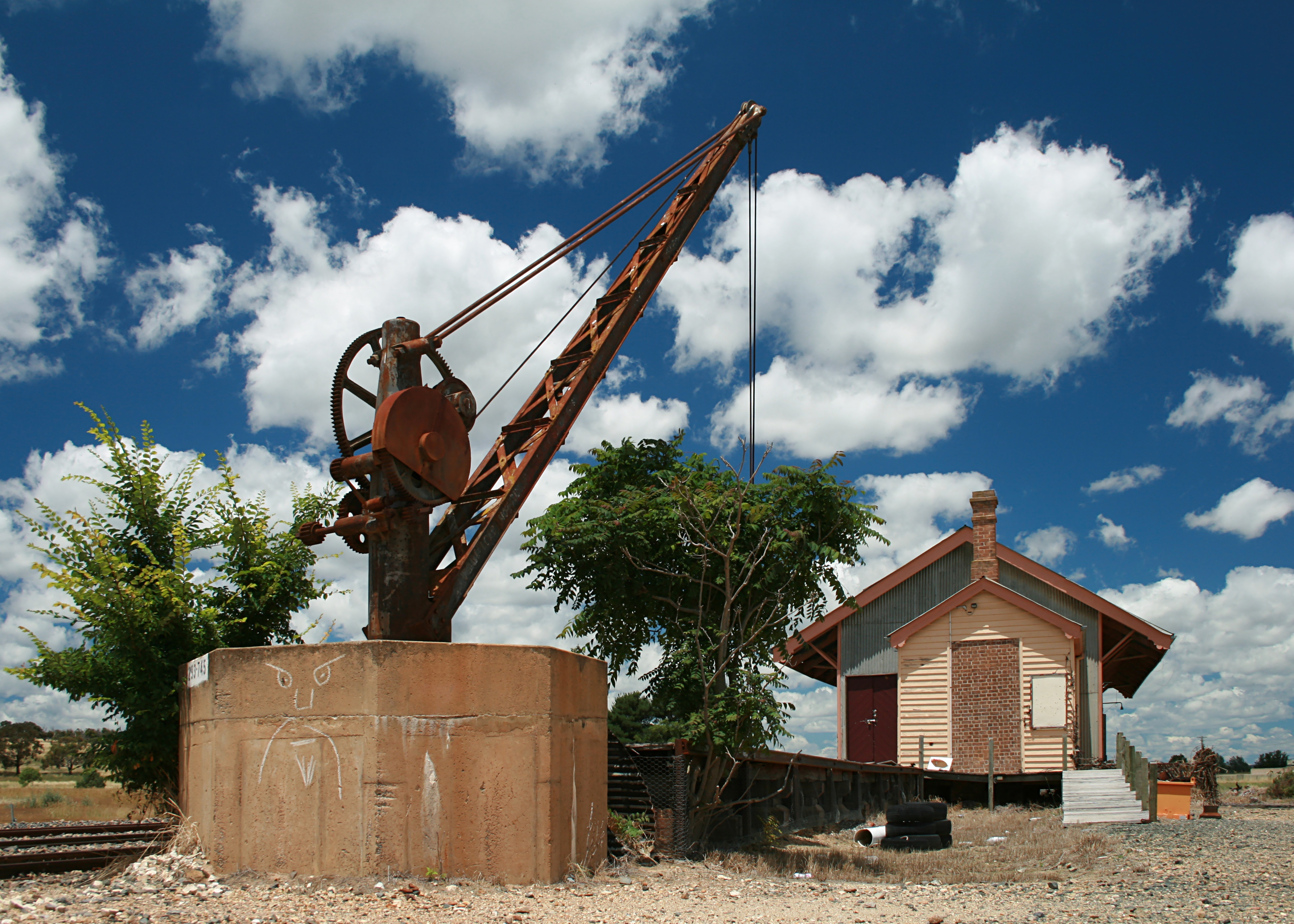
A disused rail loading platform and crane in Bungendore

Prior to European settlement, the area was occupied by the Ngarigo people, whose northernmost lands extended to the southern shore of Lake George and around the base of the steep escarpment lying to the west of what is now Bungendore.

The first Europeans in the vicinity were members of the exploratory party of Dr Charles Throsby in 1820, who, along with Hamilton Hume, also originally explored the Braidwood area. In 1824, botanist and explorer Allan Cunningham passed through Bungendore. A year later, the first European settlers arrived. The mail service to Bungendore was introduced in 1837, enhancing the importance of the village and contributing to the proclamation of Bungendore as a "town" in the same year. Also in 1837, the surveyor James Larmer laid out the Georgian-influenced grid town plan of Bungendore.

By 1848, 30 people populated the seven buildings in the town of Bungendore. The first post office was built in Bungendore in 1840, an Anglican church c 1843, and the Bungendore Inn in 1847. The latter became a Pooley and Malone staging post. By 1851, the population was 63. The 1850s saw at least two other hotels established. A flour mill was built in 1861, St Mary's Roman Catholic Church and two denominational schools in 1862, the courthouse in 1864 and a public school in 1868. In 1866, local crops grown were recorded as being wheat, oats, barley and potatoes.

When the railway arrived on 4 March 1885, the town began to grow more quickly. The town remained a railhead until the line reached Queanbeyan in 1887. New buildings appeared rapidly, such as churches, the courthouse/police station, two schools and the post office. The 1880s proved a boom period for the town and the population increased from 270 in 1881, to 700 by 1885. By then, Queanbeyan was emerging as the major town in the area. Bungendore was proclaimed a village for a second time, in 1885, as a consequence of the Crown Lands Act 1884.

In 1894, gold was discovered at Bywong. In 1901, a site known as "Lake George", just to the north of Bungendore and adjacent to Lake George, was proposed as the site for the nation's capital city. This did not eventuate, as the drawcard of Lake George failed to impress the visiting Commissioners of the time.

By 1909 rabbit trapping had become an extremely valuable industry in the area around Bungendore. The town itself had a rabbit-freezing plant that employed 14 workers and over 250 trappers. In the year ending 31 July 1909, over 1.5 million rabbits were frozen at Bungendore.

In 1992 journalist Ian McPhedran wrote that Bungendore's locals and business sector had developed a method of community cooperation superior to most other Australian small towns.

On 29 January 2017 at the Werriwa Wiener Dash, an event held as part of the annual Bungendore Show, Bungendore set the record for the most number of dachshunds in one place outside of a Dog Show with 154 dachshunds in attendance.

== Heritage listings ==
Bungendore has a number of heritage-listed sites, including:

- Gibraltar Street: Bungendore railway station
- St Philip's Anglican Church

== Population ==
At the 2021 census, there were 4,745 people in Bungendore. 83.5% of people were born in Australia. The next most common country of birth was England at 4.8%, and 2.5% identified as Aboriginal and/or Torres Strait Islander. 92.7% of people spoke only English at home. The age distribution is similar to the rest of the country, with the same median age of 38 years. The median household income was $2,922 per week, compared to the national median of $1,746. The most common responses for religion were No Religion 44.7%, Catholic 23.0% and Anglican 15.9%.

== Geography ==
Bungendore is quite near a hill known as Gibraltar Hill. and is located close to the Great Dividing Range where it traverses the Butmaroo Range, some 10 km to the East, not far from the Butmaroo Homestead.

Bungendore experiences a relatively sunny and dry oceanic climate (Cfb), similar to nearby Goulburn and Canberra. Bungendore's location in a broad valley surrounded by the peaks of the Great Dividing Range to the east often protects the town from inclement weather such as severe thunderstorms, and heavy rainfall arriving from the Tasman Sea. Light showers or drizzle falling on and east of the Great Dividing Range typically fails to reach the town centre; rural districts to the immediate east, north-east and south-east of Bungendore receive significantly more rainfall. Bungendore is also affected by the strong rain shadow cast by the Brindabella Range, which blocks most precipitation arriving from the west and southwest. Persistent cloud cover and drizzle is rare in Bungendore due to these rain shadows. Most of Bungendore's significant rainfall is therefore derived from systems originating in the northwest. Rain bearing systems from the northwest are most common during negative phases of the Indian Ocean Dipole and consequently occur in late winter and spring. During positive phases of the Indian Ocean Dipole, northwesterly rain bands are uncommon and drought usually prevails as in most of SE Australia, though is made especially acute in Bungendore due to the presence of the aforementioned rain shadows. Rainless or near rainless months usually occur at least once per year in Bungendore, most commonly in April–June when the subtropical ridge is usually overhead.

Rainfall can also be enhanced during La Nina phases in the Pacific, however, Bungendore's poor exposure to easterly rain events weakens this correlation somewhat.

Strong Indian Ocean Dipole events aside, Bungendore receives most of its annual rainfall from thunderstorms, which can often be locally severe due to Bungendore's location near the Great Dividing Range.

Squall line thunderstorms originating from the Riverina commonly affect Bungendore from October–March and occasionally outside of these months during strong cold fronts. Stronger events occasionally result in flash flooding in the town centre and damaging to locally destructive winds. Weaker pulse thunderstorms rarely form over Bungendore due to its valley location, however, thunderstorms forming on the ranges to the south often become severe over the Molonglo River valley and track towards the town, generally maintaining or increasing their severity. Hailstorms in Bungendore are less common than in Canberra, though almost always occur with these strong storms tracking from the south. Severe storms arriving from the west or northwest generally decrease in intensity once over the Lake George Escarpment, an exception being the aforementioned organised squall lines.

Tornadoes have been documented in the surrounding area; a notable event occurred at nearby Forbes Creek in January 2016. Supercells regularly form on the Tallaganda Ranges to the east and south-east of Bungendore, however usually move away from town due to the prevailing westerly steering winds. These storms occur as a result of a wind boundary between moist, cooler Tasman Sea air and hotter, drier continental westerlies. The Tallaganda Ranges have several peaks above 1300 m ASL, more than sufficient altitude to initiate deep convection. The southerly position of the Tallaganda Ranges also assists supercell development due to the presence of stronger wind shear. Similar storms also occur on the eastern fall of the Monaro region to the south, with supercell tornadoes even more frequent than in the Bungendore district.

Bungendore is situated in the SE Australian temperate grasslands biome, with a significant remnant grasslands community extant in the Turallo Nature Reserve to the south of town. These grasslands exist due to strong cold air drainage and relatively low rainfall.

Warm to hot summer days are often tempered by afternoon and evening easterly breezes, though the onset in Bungendore is later than in nearby Braidwood. Average maximum temperatures usually reach the mid to high twenties from December to March. Severe heatwaves can occasionally affect Bungendore, since the town is far enough inland to escape the moderating effect of the Tasman Sea. These heatwaves usually occur coincident with a blocking high pressure system in the Tasman Sea, and are most common from late December to mid February. Mid to late January is the warmest time of year on average, similar to most centres in SE Australia. Minimum temperatures in the summer months are usually comfortable thanks to regular easterly breezes, and lower dewpoints compared to the nearby coast. Radiational cooling is efficient in calm, cloudless conditions on account of Bungendore's valley location.

The Southeast Australian foehn often affects Bungendore. These strong to occasionally gale force westerly winds are most common in late winter and early spring when the subtropical ridge is at its northernmost position, allowing strong cold fronts and mid latitude westerlies through. Strong westerly winds are especially common during deep negative Southern Annular Mode phases; when they occur in the warm season, fire danger significantly increases. Bungendore's position in the lee of the Lake George escarpment and also in the lee of the Brindabella Range can enhance these winds (via the rain shadow wind effect). The often sunny conditions present in Bungendore in a westerly stream also increases mean wind speeds, since the temperature gradient between Bungendore and the surrounding ranges increases. Strong westerly winds can also result from low pressure systems centred in Bass Strait and Tasmania, independent of cold fronts. Foehn like conditions also occur in strong S-SW winds, with higher maxima and significantly cooler minima relative to altitude, similar to that experienced in Cooma in a NW wind.

Frost is common from late April to mid October whenever conditions are clear and calm; frost is less common during wetter climatic conditions such as during La Nina and negative Indian Ocean Dipole phases. Frost days are decreasing due to climate change and the resulting predominance of mild humid easterly winds, which increase nocturnal cloud cover. Snow occasionally falls, though usually only in the form of light flurries and rarely settles. Settled snow is somewhat more common on the Lake George escarpment at 800–900 m elevation, and in the foothills of the Great Dividing Range to the east of town. The incidence of snowfall has decreased dramatically in recent years as with other sub-alpine districts in NSW.

== Capital Wind Farm ==
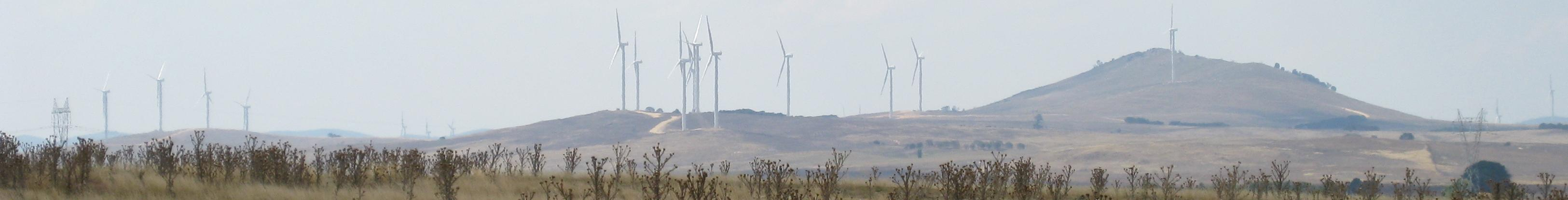
Capital Wind Farm, north of Bungendore

In 2008, following some community concerns the Capital Wind Farm was established north of Bungendore along Lake George. It is a 140.7 megawatt wind farm with 67 turbines. From 2011 to 2020, it ran at an average of 27.88% capacity factor, with a corresponding annual generation of 343.66 GWh.

== Media ==
=== Television ===
Bungendore receives five free-to-air television networks relayed from Canberra that broadcast from the Black Mountain.

- ABC
- SBS
- Seven
- WIN Television (Nine)
- Southern Cross 10

=== Radio ===
Due to proximity to the ACT, radio stations from Canberra can be received at local strength, such as ABC Radio Canberra on 666 AM, Hit 104.7 on 104.7 FM, 2CA on 1053 AM/105.7 FM and QBN FM, a community based station which broadcast from Queanbeyan on 96.7 FM

Goulburn radio stations GN FM and Eagle FM (Australia) can also be received at fair strength in Bungendore. 88.9 Braidwood FM can also be received in some parts of the town, though its signal strength is attenuated by the Great Dividing Range to the east. Cooma radio stations XL FM and Snow FM can also be received in most parts of town, owing to a clear signal path between Bungendore and Mount Roberts near Bredbo with minimal terrain blockage.

=== Newspapers ===
The local newspapers are The Queanbeyan Age and Regional Independent Bungendore which was established in 2015. The Regional Independent is a free, independent, community newspaper only serving within the Queanbeyan-Palerang local government area that is printed fortnightly.

== Transport ==
=== Railways ===
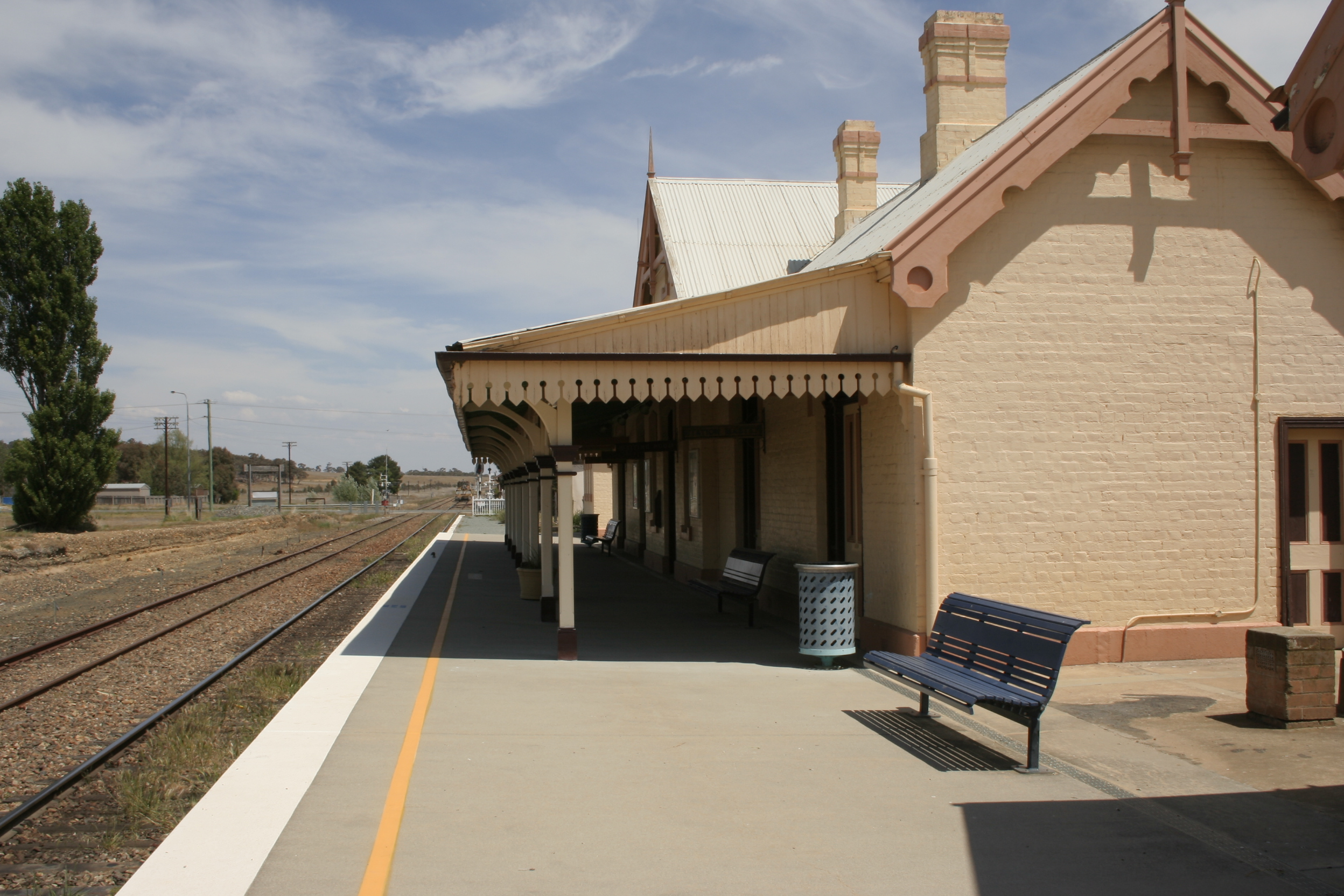
Bungendore railway station, used in the filming of The Year My Voice Broke and the Mick Jagger version of Ned Kelly

Bungendore railway station is served by three daily NSW TrainLink Xplorer services in each direction operating between Sydney and Canberra.

=== Air ===
The nearest major airport is Canberra Airport which is approximately 32 km (30 minutes drive) west of Bungendore.

=== Roads ===
The Kings Highway which links Canberra to Batemans Bay and the South Coast passes through Bungendore. The town also lies on Main Road 92, a series of rural roads between Canberra and Nowra that provide the most direct route between the capital and Jervis Bay Territory.
