= Robert Anderson (Australian general) =

Australian general and businessman

Sir Robert Anderson
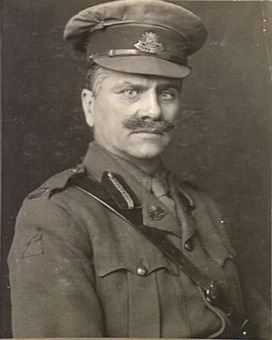
- Brigadier General Robert Anderson c. 1916
- Born: 6 August 1865; The Mint, Sydney, New South Wales
- Died: 30 December 1940 (aged 75); Double Bay, New South Wales
- Military career
- Allegiance: Australia
- Branch: Australian Army
- Service years: 1886–1918
- Rank: Brigadier General
- Commands: AIF Headquarters London (1916–17)
- Conflicts: First World War
- Awards: Knight Commander of the Order of St Michael and St George; Mentioned in Despatches; Order of the Nile (Egypt)

Brigadier General Sir Robert Murray McCheyne Anderson, KCMG (6 August 1865 – 30 December 1940) was a successful Sydney businessman and Australian Army officer. He served as head of the London-based Administrative Headquarters for the Australian Imperial Force during much of the First World War, finishing the conflict as a brigadier general.

== Early life and business career ==
Anderson was born on 6 August 1865 in The Mint, Sydney, the son of a policeman. After attending Sydney Grammar School, he worked at the Bank of New Zealand. Initially working in New Zealand, he was made manager of a branch of the bank upon his return to Sydney.

Anderson was a member of the militia, having been commissioned as a second lieutenant in 1886. He was later promoted to lieutenant in 1891. However, the day after being promoted to captain in April 1894, he resigned his commission although remained in the reserves.

Anderson later worked in local government from 1897 to 1900, firstly as Sydney's treasurer and then as town clerk. He then turned his hand to commerce and entered partnership in Allen Taylor & Company, a timber and shipping merchant. Successful in this endeavour, he was later a royal commissioner on the sugar industry.

== First World War ==
In 1915, Anderson provided advice on the re-organisation of the paymaster's branch of the Defence Department, struggling to cope with the expansion of the military as a result of the war, and which was subsequently implemented by the Minister of Defence, George Pearce. He also reported on the management of certain government departments.

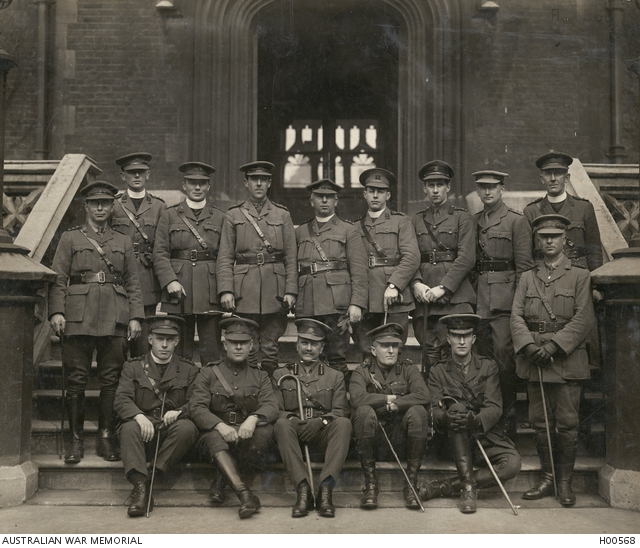
Group portrait of officers of administrative headquarters, taken on the occasion of the departure from England of Brigadier General Robert M. Anderson, pictured here in the middle of the front row, London, May 1917.

Late that year, Anderson was appointed deputy quartermaster general of the Australian Imperial Force (AIF), then based in Egypt. Brought in to implement business practices to the organisation of AIF logistics, he was made a colonel and successfully improved supply arrangements and established rest camps for soldiers on leave. When the AIF shifted to the Western Front in 1916, he relocated to London as commander of the Australian Administrative Headquarters. Within a few months, he had re-negotiated the supply and accounting arrangements then in place with the War Office for maintaining and supplying the AIF.

Anderson's work in this capacity was such that by the end of the year, he had been promoted to brigadier general and recommended for appointment as a Companion of the Order of St Michael and St George by the AIF commander, General Sir William Birdwood. His award was duly gazetted in January 1917, and within a few months, he was appointed Knight Commander of the Order of St Michael and St George. His work in London completed, Anderson returned to Australia in late 1917, with stops in Egypt and France. In 1918, he chaired a commission in New Zealand on defence department expenditure.

== Later life ==
After the war, Anderson advised the Government of New South Wales in relation to financial and commercial matters. He was also an advisor to the Commonwealth treasury. He gradually became an important part of the business community in Sydney, becoming involved as a chairman or director in a number of businesses. His wife, Jean—daughter of Robert Amos—whom he married in 1891, gradually became seriously ill and died in December 1928. Anderson himself died at his home on 30 December 1940, survived by seven children.
