= Alexander Amos =

Construction contractor in New South Wales, Australia

Alexander Amos (c.1831—1915) was a construction contractor in Victoria and New South Wales, Australia, and in New Zealand. The contracts that he completed were for civil engineering works, especially railway lines and bridges. Commencing as a contractor, in Victoria, in the 1850s, he was subsequently in partnership, under the name Railway Contractors, with his brother Robert Amos (c.1832—1905) and Alexander Kerr, until January 1875. From 1875 to September 1889, he was in partnership with his brother Robert Amos, using the name A. and R. Amos, and built a number of railway lines in New South Wales. Most of his work was under contract to New South Wales Government Railways while under the management of Commissioner for Railways, Charles Goodchap, and Engineer-in-Charge, John Whitton.

Based on his age at death, he was born around 1831. His parents were Alexander and Catherine Amos. He had an older sister, Janet, and a younger brother, Robert.

== Career in Australia ==
Amos arrived in Melbourne, aboard the ship Golden Age, in February 1854, and set up a business as a carpenter and builder, in what was then Stephen St, Melbourne, now known as Exhibition Street. His premises were in the block between Collins Street and Flinders Lane. He carried out joinery work such as making window sashes, doors, mantlepieces and other items needed for houses. He began to take on small contracts for public works, around early 1855, but by the end of the following year had won at least two contracts for entire public buildings in towns in Victoria. By 1859, he had taken on civil engineering works, such as erection of timber bridges and road construction.

A timber milling business was set up on the Goulburn River, east of Echuca, around 1865, using the name Alexander Amos and Company, but it was actually a partnership between Alexander Amos and others. Under the name Alexander Amos and Company, he was in a partnership with John Taylor, until February 1868.

Amos moved the focus of his business activities, in 1868, when an opportunity became available in New South Wales, the construction of a part of the Main North railway line. Amos joined his brother, Robert Amos, and Alexander Kerr in a partnership, known as Railway Contractors, to win and carry out that work. Neither Amos brother had prior experience in railway construction, but Kerr had managed construction of the Lithgow Zig Zag, for the contractor Patrick Higgins, Later, as a contractor in his own right, Kerr would build the Main North line from Scone to Murrurundi and parts of the North Coast railway line.

After ending the partnership with Kerr, the two Amos brothers formed a partnership as A & R Amos, and carried out construction contracts on new railway lines between 1874 and 1889, after which the two brothers fell out over money and the partnership was terminated.

In 1881, the Amos brothers had acquired a quarry site at Bowral and set up a quarry to extract trachyte for railway ballast. In 1890, a portion of the land was compulsorily acquired, for £1,500, by the Railway Commissioners, who then extracted stone for ballast from it. The South Coast railway reached Bombo in 1887, and the railways acquired a quarry there. Their Bowral quarry closed in 1892. In 1893, Robert Amos transferred his interests in the land to Alexander, who then took the Railway Commissioners to court seeking compensation, valuing the land at £209,800. He won the case, obtaining title to the land once again and was also compensated for the value of the stone that had been extracted from it by the railways.

It is notable that Amos did no further work on railways, after the Amos brothers made a large claim against the government, in 1890, and later Alexander Amos was embroiled in the dispute over the Bowral quarry site. Around the same time, there were major changes in management at the New South Wales Government Railways; Commissioner for Railways, Charles Goodchap, retired in 1888, and Engineer-in-Charge, John Whitton, in 1890. Amos did make an offer, in 1892, to construct the railway between Narrabri and Moree, and stated that he would accept payment in government bonds paying 4% interest. However, it seems that the offer was not taken up, and his days as a railway construction contractor were over.

== Works ==
=== Alexander Amos ===
- Courthouse at Dunolly (not the current courthouse building)
- Gold Office and Sub-Treasury at Castlemaine

=== Alexander Amos & Company ===
- Various bridge and road construction work in Victoria
- Timber mill near Echuca, in partnership with John Taylor

=== Railway Contractors (Amos, Amos & Kerr) c.1868 - 1874 ===
- Main North railway line, section from Muswellbrook to Scone

=== A. & R. Amos (Amos Brothers) - 1875-1889 ===
- Main Northern railway line, 'short North' sections from Homebush to Hawkesbury River, Hawkesbury River to Gosford, and Gosford to Waratah.
- Main Northern railway line, section from Tamworth to Uralla
- Main Southern railway line, sections from Yass to Cootamundra and Cootamundra to Wagga Wagga.
- Main Western railway line, section from Dubbo to Nyngan.
- Murrumbidgee river railway bridge, Wagga Wagga, erected iron bridge made by P. & W. McClellan & Co., Glasgow, and built wooden trestles.
- Breakwater and relocation (from Blackwattle Bay) and re-erection of first lifting bridge on Swansea Channel, the entrance to Lake Macquarie
- A large sawmill at Jordon's Crossing (now Bundanoon)
- Trachyte quarry on the western side of Mount Gibraltar at Bowral

=== Alexander Amos - 1889 and later ===
- Deepening of entrance to Lake Macquarie and construction of training walls.

== Family, later life, and death ==
Amos does not seem to have married, and was predeceased by his brother Robert, who died in 1905. He had fallen out with Robert over money in 1889. Their partnership had never been formalized. Their dispute eventually went to arbitration, following which Robert was awarded a payment.

Following his career as a contractor, Amos became involved in grazing. Amos had acquired a number of grazing properties, including in the Northern Territory. He also had the parcel of land at Bowral, later subdivided into 22 allotments. He was very wealthy by the time of his death.

Alexander Amos died, at his home on Kirribilli Point, on 6 August 1915, aged 84 years. He was buried in a private family cemetery, on what had been Robert Amos's property at Cairn Hill, Bundanoon, in the same plot as his sister, Janet, who died in 1907. Nearby is his brother Robert's grave. Soma Ave, Bowral takes its name from Amos, spelled backwards, and runs past the former site of his quarry.
