= Mount Gibraltar Trachyte Quarries Complex =

Former quarry in Australia

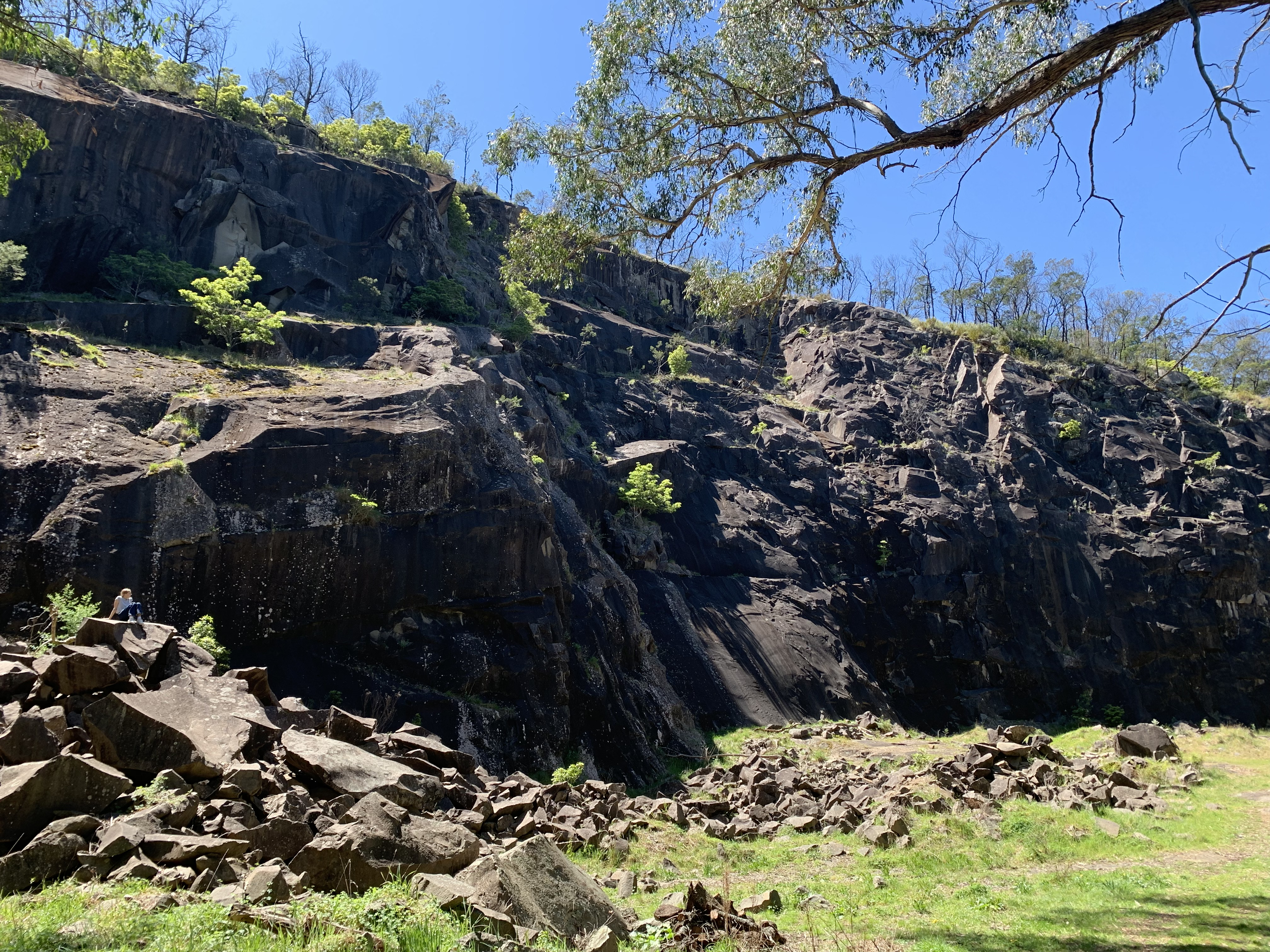
- Overgrown cliff face of Quarry C

- Location within New South Wales Location within Australia
- 34.4643°S 150.4286°E
- Location: Oxley Drive, Bowral, Wingecarribee Shire, New South Wales, Australia

History
- Built: 1886–1986

Site notes
- Owner: Telstra Corporation; Wingecarribee Shire Council

New South Wales Heritage Register
- Official name: Mount Gibraltar Trachyte Quarries Complex; The Gib
- Type: state heritage (complex / group)
- Designated: 2 December 2013
- Reference no.: 1917
- Type: Reserve
- Category: Parks, Gardens and Trees

Mount Gibraltar Trachyte Quarries Complex, also known as the Bowral quarries and The Gib, is a heritage-listed former stone quarry on Mount Gibraltar at Oxley Drive, Bowral, Wingecarribee Shire, New South Wales, Australia. It was worked from 1886 to 1986, providing stone blocks from the igneous rock (both trachyte and syenite) for significant public buildings, monuments, and other uses, both locally and further afield, including overseas. The complex was listed on the New South Wales State Heritage Register on 2 December 2013.

== History ==
Quarrying commenced in the Mount Gibraltar area following the opening of the railway in 1867. William Chaker commenced operations at the site in 1885 at the top of Cliff Street when he opened the NSW Trachyte Stone Quarrying Company (Quarry D). The "Gibraltar Rock Quarries" were opened by Messrs Leggat and Company in 1886. John Leggat supplied the Bowral Trachyte piers for the Hawkesbury River railway bridge, his last major project before going broke, still the largest scale use of the stone.

By 1888 Loveridge and Hudson, who had been quarrying poorer quality stone at Quarry A at the top of Oxley Street, took over Chaker's quarry. Notable builders of the period, they had blocks quarried for buildings such as the Equitable Life Building (George Street, Sydney) the Australasia Bank (corner of Martin Place, Sydney) and the anchor blocks for the Hampden Bridge in Kangaroo Valley.

By 1890 the Pope family was quarrying blocks (Quarry C leased from John Thompson) of which the largest was 9 tons 7 hundredweight; these became part of a gate pillar for Centennial Park (Sydney). The blocks were often taken out by rail from a specially constructed siding in Bowral. The quarries also provided local building stone and several quarries provided kerb stones and tramway supports for local towns as well as Sydney.

In 1881 the Amos Brothers acquired Quarry E on the western face of Mount Gibraltar, along Soma Avenue (Amos spelt backward). By 1888 they were producing stone for railway ballast. In 1890 the government resumed part of their land and opened the Government Ballast Quarry (Quarry F). This closed after 2 years and after a court case, Alexander Amos got back the land that had been resumed.

The NSW Government quarry on the Mittagong side supplied rock to a crusher via a double light rail system. There were a great many quarrymen and stonemasons working at the time, some living in poor circumstances in temporary dwellings on top of the mountain. There were many accidents and the men formed the "Berrima District Workmen's Accident Relief and Endowment Fund" as a result.

As early as 1894 the government geologist E. F. Pittman urged the use of Bowral Trachyte "for any important building in which permanence might be desired. The "trachyte" may, for all practical purposes, be regarded as indestructible". When Edwards Raht chose the Bowral material for 350 George Street (Equitable Building) he compared it to Cologne Cathedral saying it would last for not a hundred years but a thousand.

In 1906, geologist and later Antarctic explorer Douglas Mawson published a paper about the geology of the area, in particular the aegirine in the syenite igneous rocks. This remained the only scientific study of the minerals in the rocks until a University of Wollongong honours student wrote a paper about the pegmatite veins in the rocks in 2004.

The trachyte was described in 1915 as being "very solid. Its weight-carrying capacity is equal to most of the known granites". The use of Bowral Trachyte by Sydney City's engineers as a hard rock to replace crumbling sandstone kerbs and gutters was thought to be the catalyst which if not initiated, certainly spurred The Gib's development; the use as a building material came later. Perhaps without the quarry's' successes in developing and serving a market for hard rock, the stone's potential as a superb building material might never have been realised. It was thus used extensively in late 19th century Sydney for facades but also for foundations, flagging and for bridge piers, notably in the Hawkesbury (Brooklyn) Bridge. In 1914 trachyte was sent to London and Scotland. The stone was used locally for monuments, public works and private buildings. The columns of the Queen Victoria Building are made from Bowral Trachyte and were turned on the Abernethy and Co Stonemason's Lathe, which is also listed on the State Heritage Register. At least 16 structures constructed using Bowral Trachyte are listed on the SHR.

At his death in 1915, Alexander Amos owned most of the northern and western sides of the mountain. The administrators of his estate sold the summit site to Joshua Stokes, on behalf of the Bowral Municipal Council, for a future reserve while the lower portions were subdivided for housing.

During the depression the Minister for Local Government, Eric Spooner, visited Mount Gibraltar, announcing that 60,000 pounds would be made available for relief work. By 1936 the new road and lookouts on Mount Gibraltar were completed. The following year Spooner had plans prepared for the development of parking and picnicking areas on the site. As in earlier periods these workers camped onsite, creating another depression "Struggletown".

The purchase of land for a reserve by Joshua Stokes led to him losing public office for a perceived waste of public money. It was not until after World War II that the local Council implemented a programme of expanding Stokes' original 59 acre purchase. Stokes' forethought was not honoured until 1950 by the construction of the John Stokes Memorial on Mount Gibraltar.

By 1973 only Quarry C was active and changes in building methods and materials had reduced the demand for Bowral Trachyte. There were also strong community concerns over the impacts that quarrying was having on the beauty of the site. Additionally, quality of life near to the quarry was an emerging concern with the regular blasting and expulsion of 'Pope's Dust' into the air. Negotiations with F. J. Pope and Sons saw the quarry close down. Ten years later an application was made to quarry stone for the extension of the National Library of Australia in Canberra. In the face of community opposition a deal was struck allowing a small amount of stone to be quarried, but with the remaining active quarry being sold to Council at its completion. The remaining quarrying sites were incorporated into the reserve in 1986.

In 2003 the Department of Public Works removed some loose blocks to repair the steps of the State Library of New South Wales.

The land was neglected until 1995 when a volunteer management committee was formed under the auspices of Wingecarribee Shire Council to "care control and manage the reserve". Weed containment activities have been carried out, subsequently revealing some of the former quarry structures.

The Mount Gibraltar Landcare and Bushcare Group has been involved with structural projects at the site since its inception in 1995, the following projects have been undertaken by the group:

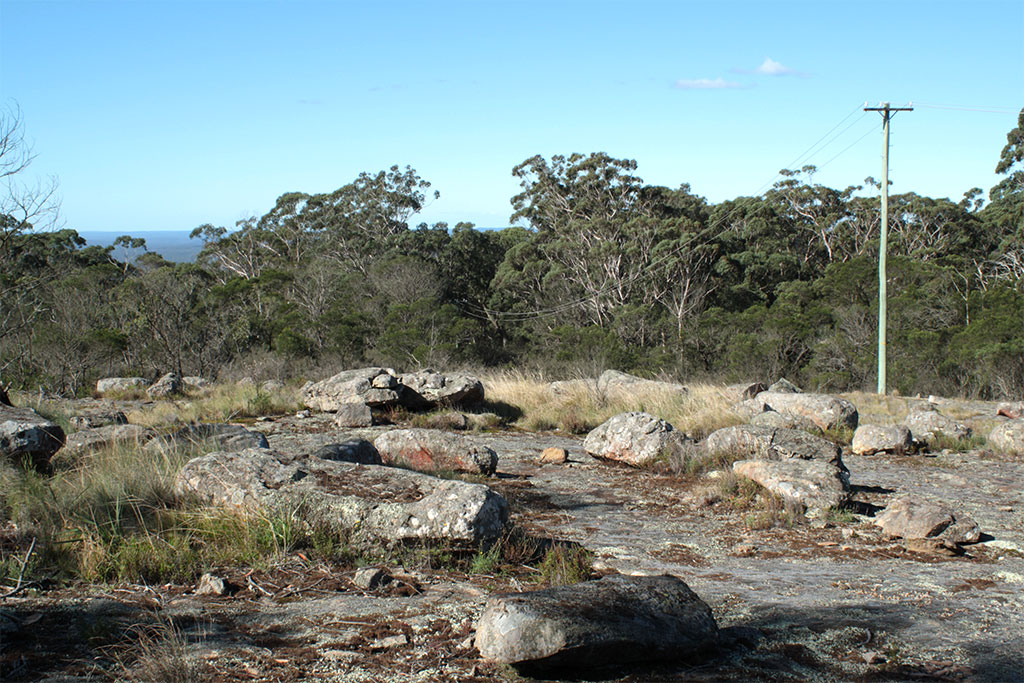
Peak of Mount Gibraltar showing exposed igneous rock platform

- 1995: Inner Bowl Carpark.
- 1996: Bowral Lookout: Steps to Plinth and Paving and Concrete Path to Gents Toilet and Rim Track.
- 1996: Jellore Lookout: Steps and platform.
- 1999: Jellore Lookout: Concrete path to Lookout
- 2000: Jellore Lookout: Entrance wall.
- 2001: Bowral Lookout: Wheelchair Access track.
- 2001: Removed damaged Lions Shelter Shed.
- 2002: Mittagong Lookout: Walls and Path.
- 2003: Bowral Lookout: Walls.
- 2005: Inner Bowl restoration, roof and table.
- 2010: Bowral Lookout: Landscaping.
- 2011: Heritage Quarries Circuit Track.

The quarrying was an integral part of the lives of those living in Bowral with the 4pm event, a huge, dull thud shaking windows and vases. The following description is from Elizabeth Smith, a resident at the time:

We have lived at the very top of Cliff Street in Bowral for forty-six years, in a house built of trachyte for a quarry worker in the 1880s. When we first arrived some blasting in the quarry nearest was still taking place. It seemed quite random, and the explosions came at any time, with no warning. We were finding freshly chipped trachyte rocks in our garden, then one day the explosion was followed by a stone crashing on our roof, and another narrowly missing the pram in which our baby daughter slept. At this my husband rushed up into the quarry to complain, as there were no warning, notices, nets, or anything else being used. He was slightly reassured that they were nearly finished, and I think there was only one more blast before it stopped for good! Following this activity, a large number of huge blocks of trachyte were extracted, but the diamond drill and expansion method were employed, and apart from the noise of the drilling, it didn't worry us at all.

== Description ==
The quarries have created considerable scars in the side of Mount Gibraltar and are most visible from the southern/Bowral side. At close quarters the works cliffs are impressive with walls of up to 50 metres. The site contains rubble which is used from time to time for current projects, e.g. plinths for plaques and landscaping work within the reserve.

The remnants of the site's industrial heritage are present with various items hidden under encroaching weeds, and infrastructure such as road/track ways, loading benches etc. are emerging due to the ongoing weed eradication programme.

Also contained within the Reserve are several stone structures and steps built during the 1930s through a Spooner Unemployment Program. Part of the same program saw the construction of the Scenic Loop Road and an impressive retaining wall on the western side. These structures comprise the following: Stone Stairway; Bowral Lookout Shelter and picnic table: male and female WC building; Inner Bowl Shelter, Oxley View Shelter, ruined shelter on corner of Scenic Loop, Mt Jellore Lookout and shelter, Mittagong Lookout shelter and Joshua Stokes Memorial.

In general the quarry sites are considerably overgrown, although some portion have been cleared. A network of walking trails runs through the reserve. As a result of clearance programs, some artefacts and infrastructure have been recovered, e.g. steps cut into the rock face, machinery, building materials, etc.

The nominated quarries all lie within the Mount Gibraltar Reserve where the rock supports the Endangered Ecological Community of Mount Gibraltar Forest, now regenerating after 15 years of weed removal. Some quarries were reported to be currently infested by weeds as at 26 November 2012. The site is considered to have moderate to high archaeological potential, as evidenced by the recovery of artefacts from beneath vegetation regrowth; sub-surface deposits are highly likely.

=== Quarries at Mount Gibraltar ===
- Quarry A: Loveridge and Hudson 1888
- Quarry C: Rayward, Pope 1889–1979
- Quarry D: Chalker, Loveridge and Hudson 1885–1986
- Quarry E: Amos, Mascot 1894–1962
- Quarry F: Government 1890–1892

== Heritage listing ==
Mount Gibraltar Quarries are significant as purpose built quarries that were used consistently for 100 years of quarrying, from 1886 to 1986. Today there are six distinct quarrying locations regarded as being historically significant. The trachyte quarried there is unique and provided dimension stone for notable buildings throughout NSW and internationally. The quarries were an important aspect of Bowral's industrial history.

The stone is geologically known as microsyenite and was commercial traded as Bowral Trachyte. Bowral Trachyte became popular for kerbing in the later nineteenth and early twentieth century. The use of Bowral Trachyte by Sydney City's engineers as a hard rock to replace crumbling sandstone kerbs and gutters was the very catalyst which if not initiated, certainly spurred The Gib's development.

It was used locally in some quantity, but the bulk of it was exported to Sydney for major city buildings (Challis House, Martin Place; National Mutual Building, George Street; QVB, George Street; ANZAC Memorial, Hyde Park) and major public works (Hawkesbury River Bridge at Brooklyn). These structures have been listed on the State Heritage Register for their architectural, technical and engineering qualities. The trachyte from Bowral and the quarries from which it was extracted are significant for their contribution to the built heritage of the State. The stone from these quarries was used for the commemorative stones for Federation and for the foundation of Canberra and many war memorials.

The ballast quarry was important to the construction of the Great Southern Railway line from Mittagong to Goulburn, in the late 19th century. For a hundred years stonemasons and quarrymen used their remarkable skills for blasting, cutting, trimming, polishing and handling the dense rock. The technologies of the time have technical significance and the quarries, as an entity, formed the basis of social development in Bowral as many families were involved with their operation. It was a major industry for the township of Bowral. An important Spooner depression relief program supported the region by using the stone for improvements on the mountain.

Mount Gibraltar is a volcanic intrusion that cooled in such a way as to form this special rock. 180 million years of erosion have exposed the rock. Mount Gibraltar Microsyenite is the technical term for the stone which was marketed as "Bowral Trachyte" at the time in the belief it would be exempt from Government tax. Bowral Trachyte, has the unique properties of great strength and durability and decorative potential when polished plus accessibility for quarrying. These quarries are of State significance due to the fact that microsyenite of this quality, both aesthetically and functionally, is rare internationally.

The rock was studied by geologists such as Andrew Griffith Taylor, Edgeworth David and Douglas Mawson. Architects such as Walter Liberty Vernon, George Macrae, Edward E. Raht; builders such as John Leggat, Loveridge and Hudson, Amos Brothers, Saunders, Phippard Bros., Melocco Bros. and engineers of the railways, road, bridges and dams made use of the stone.

The Mount Gibraltar Quarries are a significant industrial landscape. Although overgrown, with many elements relocated, the quarries retain many elements of their industrial heritage including; scars of the quarrying that show how the stone was removed (plug and feather technique), machinery and the remains of trackways and tramways.

The Mount Gibraltar Forest is significant due to its rarity, being identified as an endangered ecological community under the NSW Threatened Species Conservation Act and threatened ecological community under the Environment Protection and Biodiversity Conservation Act 1999. The unique geology of the area supports a collection of flora that, as an assemblage, does not exist outside of the Reserve.

Mount Gibraltar Trachyte Quarries Complex was listed on the New South Wales State Heritage Register on 2 December 2013, having satisfied the following criteria:

The place is important in demonstrating the course, or pattern, of cultural or natural history in New South Wales.

It meets this criterion at State level because the quarries were a source of distinctive material for late Victorian to interwar construction of numerous significant public buildings, roads and railways and commemorative structures in NSW and internationally. At least 16 State significant buildings listed on the SHR have been constructed using Bowral Trachyte. This site is significant in the development of the built heritage of NSW.

The quarries supported a major depression relief program which constructed the Scenic Loop road over Mount Gibraltar and the infrastructure of shelters and lookouts for passive recreation in the Reserve. The quarries also supported the construction of the Great Southern Railway which opened the region up for further settlement and tourism and contributed greatly to the economic development of the area.

The place has a strong or special association with a person, or group of persons, of importance of cultural or natural history of New South Wales's history.

The quarries meet this criterion at a local level as they evoke and acknowledge the fraternity of the quarrymen, builders and stonemasons who worked this site and the thousands of people employed in Depression era works programs.

The place is important in demonstrating aesthetic characteristics and/or a high degree of creative or technical achievement in New South Wales.

It meets the criterion at State level because of its ability to demonstrate the skill and industrial technology of the stoneworkers in managing the extremely hard and durable rock. The quarries are able to demonstrate the quarrying techniques and products of the late 19th to late 20th centuries. The technology required to cut and polish the very hard rock was remarkable, as was the ability to handle its weight.

The massive quarry scars also provide an aesthetic component to the landscape of the iconic landmark of Mount Gibraltar. This is the highest point between Sydney and Canberra and is a considerable regional presence. The Mount Gibraltar Reserve is accessible to the public and reflects the character of the rock in its infrastructure.

The place has strong or special association with a particular community or cultural group in New South Wales for social, cultural or spiritual reasons.

It meets this criterion at local level because the quarry is a natural reserve that is utilised by the local community for recreation activities. It is also an important tourist destination, contributing to the economy of the region.

The place has potential to yield information that will contribute to an understanding of the cultural or natural history of New South Wales.

It meets this criterion at State level because there is potential for further understanding of the quarrying industry and the scientific understanding of the unique rock. The quarry represents a potential archaeological resource with the archaeological remnants of the entire quarrying process likely present.

The site provides opportunities to understand study and interpret quarrying and stone finishing techniques of the past.

The ecological community at this site provides an opportunity to further study and understand this community of plants.

The place possesses uncommon, rare or endangered aspects of the cultural or natural history of New South Wales.

It meets this criterion at a State level because the quarries reveal the unique quality of the rock that also supports the natural endangered ecological community of Mount Gibraltar Forest. The Mount Gibraltar Quarries are considered to be exceptionally rare and possibly unique due to the rarity of the materials quarried there, particularly Bowral Trachyte; this material was only extracted from Mount Gibraltar and was a favoured building stone for many impressive buildings in Sydney, statewide and internationally.

The ecological communities on the site have been identified as being rare at both a State and national level.

The site is considered to be rare in a local, State and international context

The place is important in demonstrating the principal characteristics of a class of cultural or natural places/environments in New South Wales.

It meets this criterion at a State level because they are representative of the extraordinary skills of the early industrial era in NSW.

They represent an industrial landscape that contains the remnants of the quarrying process and its impact on the development of the built heritage of NSW.

== See also ==
- Mount Gibraltar
- Bowral
- Southern Highlands
