= Grahamstown, New South Wales =

Grahamstown New South Wales
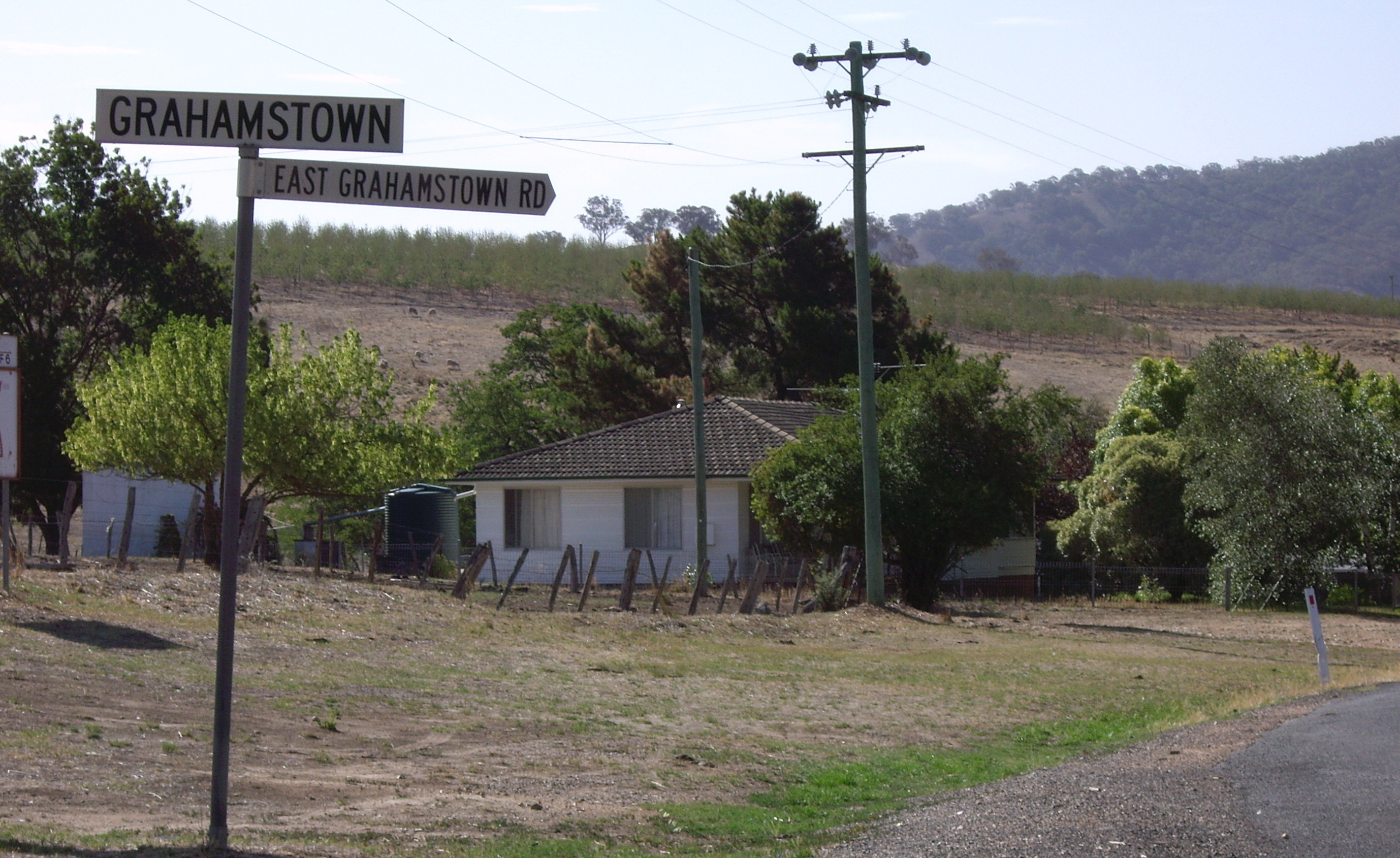
- Grahamstown

- Coordinates: 35°16′S 148°02′E
- Population: 61 (2016 census)
- Postcode(s): 2729
- Elevation: 309 m (1,014 ft)
- Location: 12 km (7 mi) from Adelong; 13 km (8 mi) from Tumblong
- LGA(s): Snowy Valleys Council
- County: Wynyard
- State electorate(s): Wagga Wagga
- Federal division(s): Riverina

Grahamstown is a village community in the central east part of the Riverina and situated about 12 kilometres north of Adelong and 13 kilometres south of Tumblong. At the 2016 census, Grahamstown had a population of 61 people.

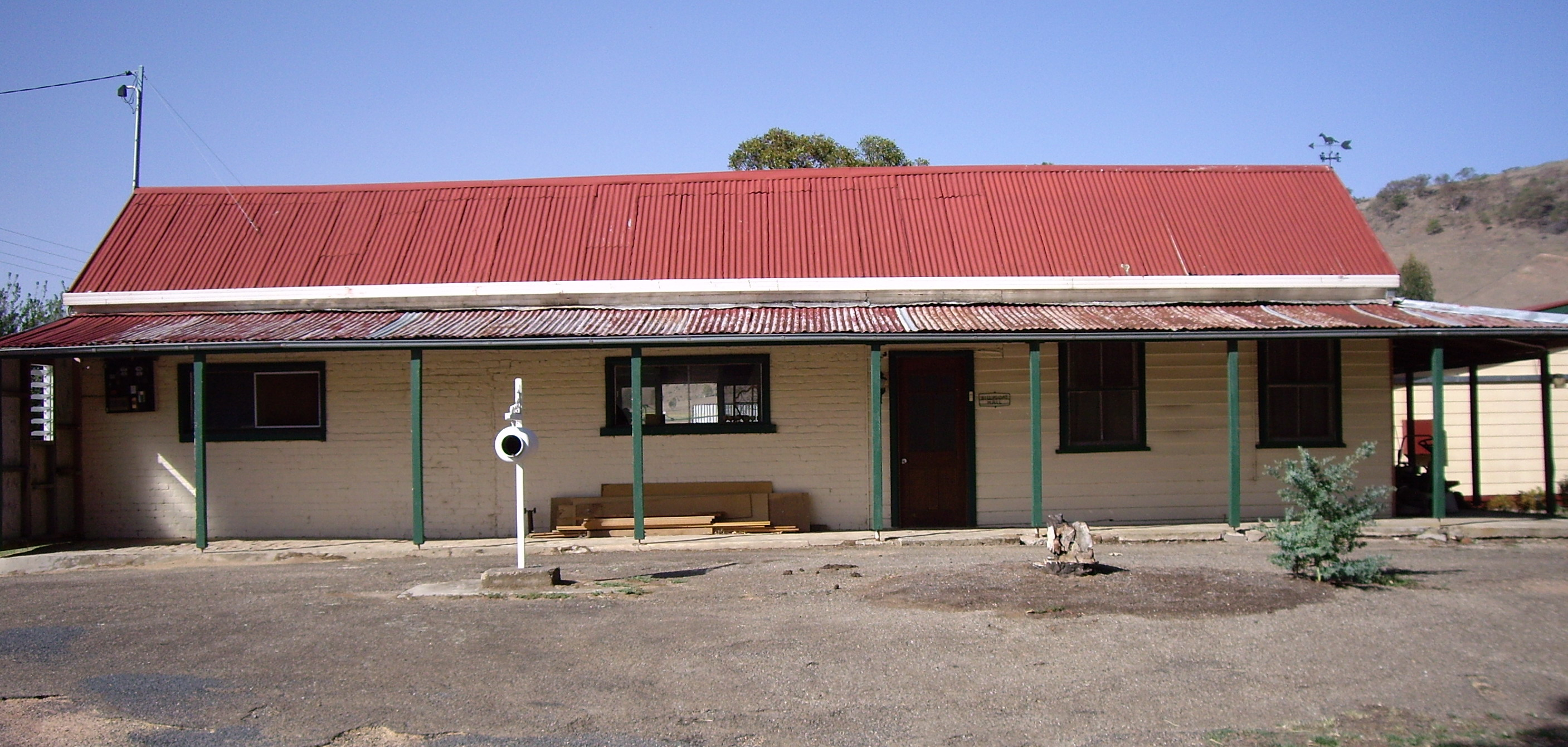
Grahamstown - Billy Goat Hall

Grahamstown consists of a small number of private residences on the Adelong to Tumblong road and the somewhat dilapidated Billy Goat Hall.

The area now known as Grahamstown lies on the traditional lands of the Wiradjuri people.

Gold was mined in the area at Gibraltar Hill and alluvial deposits were mined there by dredge.

Grahamstown Post Office opened on 16 December 1881 and closed in 1981.

== See also ==
- Gibralter Hill
