= Capital Wind Farm =

Wind farm in New South Wales, Australia

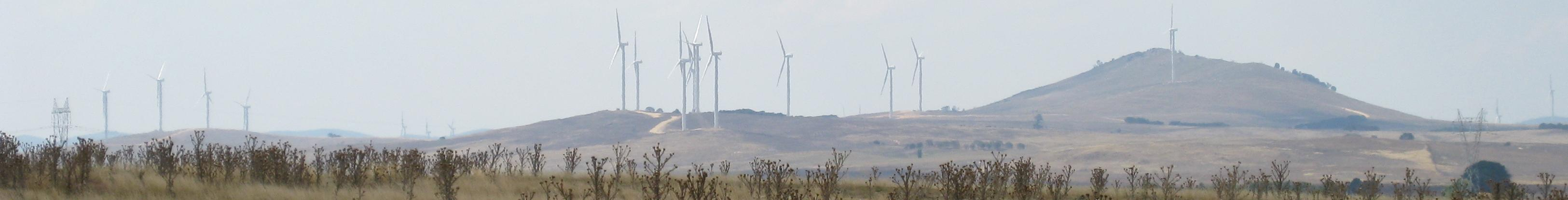
- Country: Australia
- Location: 30 km (19 mi) north east of Canberra
- Coordinates: 35.1458°S 149.5671°E
- Status: Operational
- Construction began: Early 2008
- Commission date: October 2009
- Construction cost: A$370 million
- Owner: Infigen Energy
- Operator: Infigen Energy

Wind farm
- Type: Onshore
- Site usage: Farming
- Hub height: 80 metres (262 ft)
- Rotor diameter: 88 metres (289 ft)
- Site area: 35 square kilometres (3,500 ha)

Power generation
- Units operational: 67 × 2.1 MW
- Make and model: Suzlon S88
- Nameplate capacity: 140.7 MW
- Capacity factor: 27.88% (average 2011-2020)
- Annual net output: 343.66 GWh (average 2011-2020)

External links
- Website: www.infigenenergy.com

The Capital Wind Farm near Bungendore is the largest wind farm in New South Wales. It is part of the 6,000-hectare (15,000-acre) Capital Renewable Energy Precinct, along with nearby Woodlawn Wind Farm and the Capital East Solar Demonstration Plant.

Capital Wind Farm was built by international contractors Suzlon Energy for owner and operator Infigen Energy. Construction began in early 2008, and the wind farm became fully operational in October 2009. It is a 140.7 megawatt wind farm with 67 turbines.

In 2009, the project was expected to have a capacity factor of 35.8%, and thus generate on average 441 GWh of energy per year. However, from 2011 to 2020 it ran at an average of 27.88% capacity factor, with a corresponding annual generation of 343.66 GWh.

== Location ==
The Capital Wind Farm is around 30 kilometres (19 mi) north east of Canberra, just southeast of Lake George and north of Bungendore. It is located in open farming country, with minimal obstructions in the landscape and smooth topography.

== Construction ==
The Capital Wind Farm was built for Infigen Energy by Suzlon Energy. It was constructed as part of the Kurnell Desalination Plant project to offset the power usage of the desalination plant.

"The wind farm has been designed to produce more than enough energy to operate the desalination plant to cover the days when there is less wind. It will increase the supply of wind energy in NSW by over 700%. It is a massive boost to the renewable energy sector and an environmentally sensible way to offset the power needs of the desalination plant."

The wind farm was completed in October 2009 at a cost estimated between A$220 million and A$370 million. It was opened by the Prime Minister at the time, Kevin Rudd, in November 2009.

== People and employment ==
Since the wind farm was established, the population of nearby Bungendore has increased by 24 per cent, which the Clean Energy Council has claimed is because of its proximity to the wind farm.

During the construction of the Capital Wind Farm, 120 people were employed on the project. Over the construction period, about A$10 million went into the local economy, with spending up at the local stores, restaurants and motels. Since construction has finished there are 15 ongoing jobs at the wind farm for service and maintenance.

Some residents who live nearby to the Capital Wind Farm have complained about the noise from the turbines.

== Operations ==
The generation table uses eljmkt nemlog to obtain generation values for each month.

Capital Wind Farm Generation (MWh)
Year	Total	Jan	Feb	Mar	Apr	May	Jun	Jul	Aug	Sep	Oct	Nov	Dec
2011	330,153	24,371	21,017	25,887	21,240	23,053	44,703	40,425	22,345	40,296	24,303	26,351	16,162
2012	297,064	25,062	16,197	18,864	15,830	16,392	21,578	22,961	47,684	33,177	26,195	20,994	32,130
2013	369,658	26,410	22,866	28,609	20,651	27,506	23,714	31,744	55,189	36,148	38,052	30,211	28,558
2014	312,958	27,791	22,841	19,663	16,855	22,254	36,537	41,554	23,722	27,342	25,213	23,440	25,746
2015	318,925	26,954	15,771	27,006	21,545	36,441	15,766	32,011	40,761	21,819	27,091	27,074	26,686
2016	385,739	23,836	21,933	17,217	15,709	52,070	44,241	44,201	30,433	29,154	48,656	30,421	27,868
2017	334,639	25,886	26,918	25,939	14,056	17,714	14,302	42,318	43,217	53,499	22,356	18,283	30,151
2018	362,621	19,263	25,908	29,562	22,220	25,986	31,550	44,886	46,333	29,100	29,319	33,849	24,645
2019	367,982	21,997	24,572	25,353	18,835	30,840	18,624	40,172	41,305	36,338	28,501	42,414	39,031
2020	356,829	31,037	31,876	22,143	34,971	25,757	22,903	22,894	47,482	34,570	31,919	20,649	30,628
2021		27,356	19,614	32,710	20,721	19,174	28,916	41,458	36,184	34,815			

Note: Records date back to 2011.

== See also ==
- Wind power in Australia
- List of wind farms in New South Wales
