= 348–352 George Street, Sydney =

Heritage-listed building in Sydney, Australia

348–352 George Street
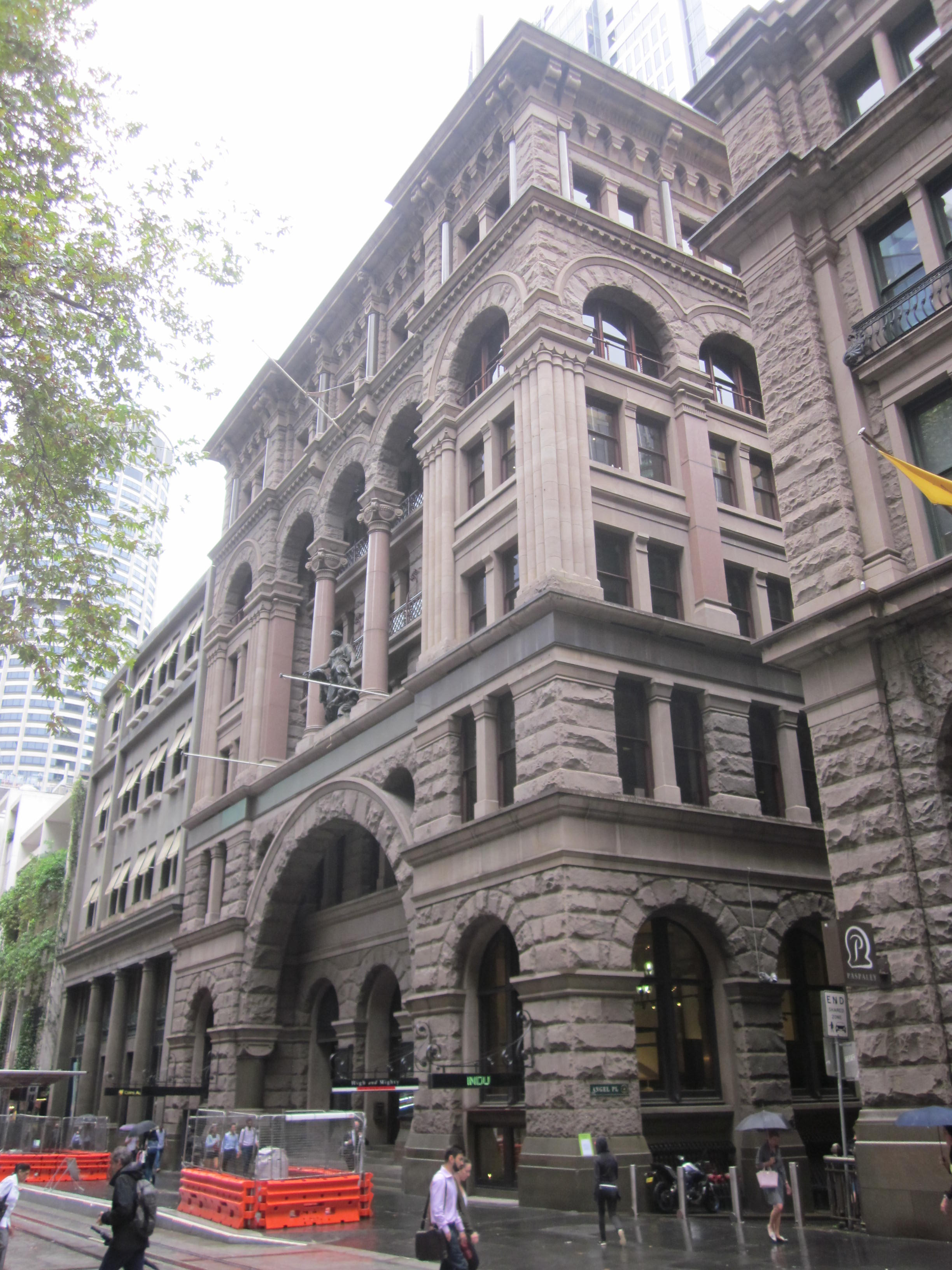
- 348–352 George Street, Sydney, New South Wales

- Location within Sydney Location within Australia
- 33.8669°S 151.2074°E
- Location: 348 - 352 George Street, Sydney central business district, City of Sydney, New South Wales, Australia

History
- Built: 1894

Site notes
- Architect: Edward Raht
- Architectural style: Federation Romanesque

New South Wales Heritage Register
- Official name: National Mutual Building (former); Society General Building; Societe Generale House; Equitable Building; 350 George
- Type: State heritage (built)
- Designated: 2 April 1999
- Reference no.: 234
- Type: Insurance company/building
- Category: Commercial
- Builders: Hudson and Loveridge

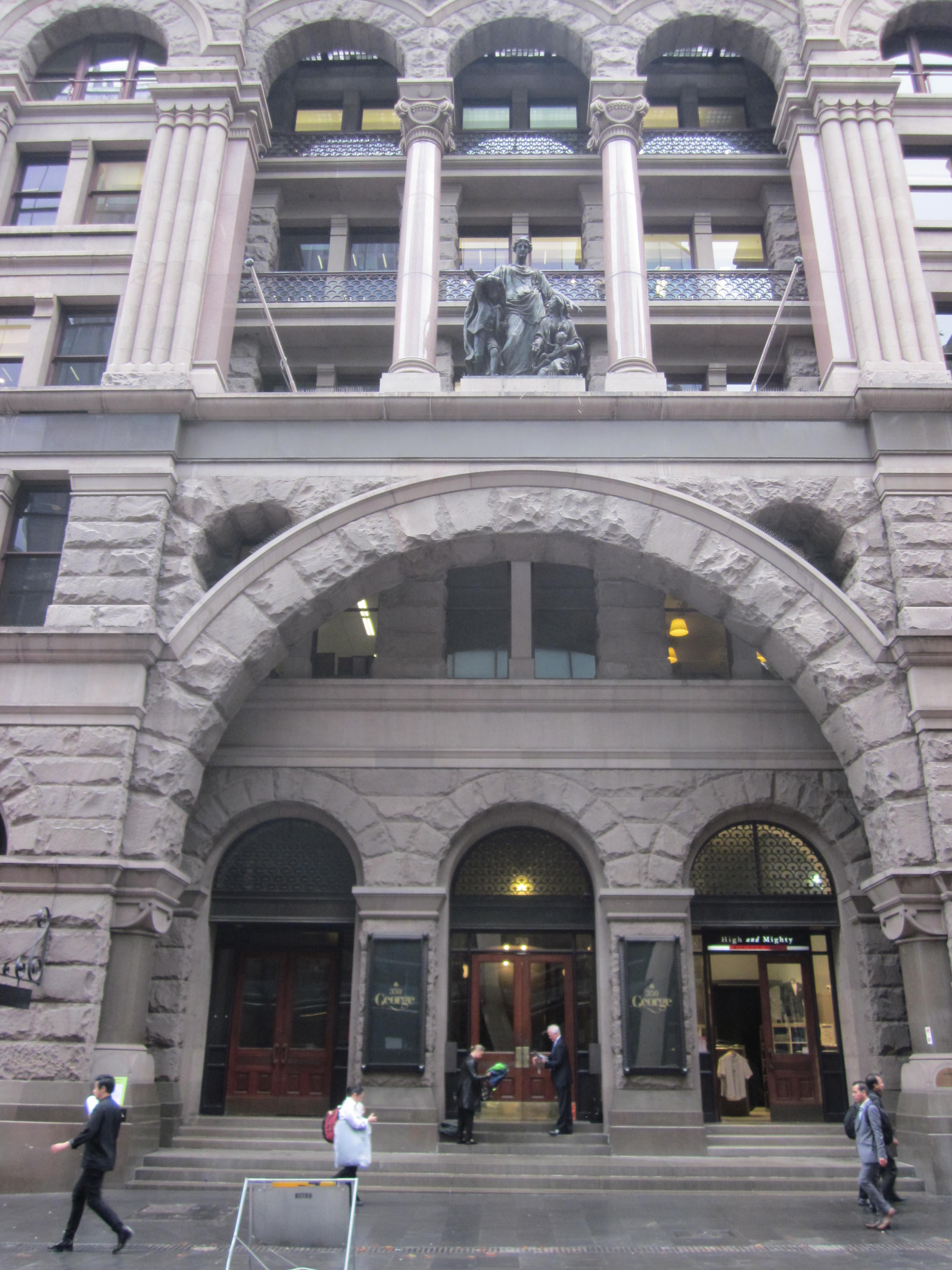
Entrance to 348–352 George Street, Sydney

348–352 George Street, Sydney is a heritage-listed office building located at 348–352 George Street, in the Sydney central business district, in the City of Sydney local government area of New South Wales, Australia. It was designed by Edward Raht and built by Hudson and Loveridge. It is also known as the National Mutual Building (former), Society General Building, Societe Generale House, Equitable Building and 350 George Street, Sydney. The property is privately owned and was added to the New South Wales State Heritage Register on 2 April 1999.

== History ==
The subject land, on the east side of George Street opposite the original Barracks Square had been built upon from the early days of the colony. In 1880 number 348 was occupied by Fraser's Auction Rooms, number 350 by a jeweller and number 352 by Paling's famous Music Warehouse. The backs of the buildings were accessible from Morts Passage (later known as Angel Place) to the south and through an arched right of way to the north. In 1890 a major American insurance company, The Equitable Life Assurance Society of the United States of America, purchased the block containing numbers 348, 350 and 352, and the existing buildings were demolished. The Equitable Life Assurance Society sent out from America their distinguished New York architect, Edward Raht (born in Austria). Raht was noted for his commissions to design prestige buildings for insurance companies and banks. Raht designed the office building around an innovative steel frame, faced with heavy, load-bearing trachyte in the Federation Romanesque style. The trachyte came from the Bowral quarries on Mount Gambier owned by the contractors Loveridge and Hudson. The building was exceptional for its use of trachyte for the entire exterior and not merely for lower stories, arches and columns. It was one of the first buildings to be constructed with external walls entirely of trachyte, which was more commonly used as a decorative stone in combination with other materials. Erected in 1894, the building was an early example in Australia of the influence of the American Romanesque style developed by Raht's countryman, Henry Hobson Richardson, from the 1870s onward. After studying in Paris, Richardson had evolved his own simplified distillation of the Romanesque style and attracted numerous American disciples. The building is also a tangible expression of the expansion of major American companies into the Australian insurance market in the late Victorian period. Raht also designed offices for the Equitable Life Assurance Society of the United States of America in Melbourne in 1892, using the same steel frame and thick stone walls (in this case granite). Raht remained in Australia and designed the Bank of Australasia building at 354-360 George Street in 1904.

By 1898, the pioneer Australian feminist and prominent member of the Womanhood Suffrage League of NSW, Maybanke Anderson (Wolstenholme), was occupying Room 16 on the third floor of the building as the office for her journal, The Woman's Voice. In April of that year, Anderson also established the Women's Federal League as a separate, though related, organisation to the Australasian Federation League. Maybanke Anderson herself became the Women's League's Honorary Secretary. Though the Bathurst People's Convention of 1896 had included a women's organising committee, the League formed by Anderson was the first organisation specifically established to get women to take an active political role in the wider Federation campaign in NSW. However, as women did not have the vote in NSW, the purpose of the League was to urge women to encourage their menfolk to support the federation cause and vote for federation in the referendum scheduled for 3 June 1898. To this end, Anderson printed a circular letter asking women to join the League, to form their own branches of the organisation in each centre of their district and to form small groups of canvassers in each electorate. She intended that the canvassers would visit outlying areas as part of a campaign to urge all men to secure their voter's right and record a vote on the day of the referendum. By early May, Maybanke Anderson had sent out from her office in the then Equitable Building copies of the circular letter to suburban mayoresses, about one hundred wives of country mayors and many other well-known women. For all Anderson's efforts, it is not clear to what extent women supported the Women's Federal League nor to what extent it was effective. There is no indication that any branches of the League were formed in response to her circular, though this may in part have been because of the very short time between the establishment of the organisation and the holding of the referendum. Nevertheless, the League seems to have faded away in the aftermath of the referendum, which failed to secure the required number of votes in favour of federation. A year later, in the lead-up to the second federation referendum, two other women's leagues were formed, one in Sydney known as the Ladies' Federal League and one in the Riverina town of Hay. Neither of these appears to have had any connection with the League founded by Maybanke Anderson in 1898.

The Equitable Building retained its character as an insurance office, passing first to the National Mutual Life Assurance Company and later to the Societe Generale.

== Description ==
The building is a six-storey structure (with basement) which exhibits many of the distinctive features of the Federation Romanesque style. These include rock-faced masonry, a large and strongly modelled semicircular opening at the ground and first floor level, an arcade above and squat masonry columns with Romanesque capitals at the first and top floor levels. The George Street and Angel Place facades feature arcades heavily modelled in Bowral trachyte and marble, mostly in the form of heavily rusticated rock-faced blocks, erected by the stone masonry firm of Hudson and Loveridge.

The less exposed Ash Street facade is in brick relieved by a trachyte base, string-course, window mullions and spandrels. The main George Street entrance is dominated by a huge arch spanning some 13 metres each individual voussoir weighs three tons. The unusual recessed facade above has window balconies on the second, third and fourth floors behind classical columns. Building materials are all of high quality.

The internal structure system is an early example of steel-framed structure for internal load with external load-bearing walls. It consists of masonry walls, cast iron and mild steel columns, beams and joists. The board room is remarkable. The building has a full height atrium around which are the main stair and lobbies, constructed from slabs of marble supported directly off steel frames and serving as both floors and ceilings. The atrium has a decorative ceiling of coloured glass, and the atrium is lined with marble facings and decorative bronze work.

The early lift cars are used in two modern enclosures. It relates to the nearby ANZ Bank also designed by Raht in the same materials and with a similarly heavily modelled facade, but in neo-classical style.

== Heritage listing ==
As at 26 July 2007, the building (1894) is a fine example of the Federation Romanesque style of architecture and as one of the earliest buildings in Australia to show the influence of this American Romanesque style. The building is associated with American architect, Edward Raht, acknowledged at the time for having introduced the Federation Romanesque style to Australia. Raht followed the originator of this style, American architect Henry Hobson Richardson. It was one of the first buildings to be constructed with external walls entirely of trachyte, which was more commonly used as a decorative stone in combination with other materials. It is a source of information about overseas construction techniques at the turn of the century, including terracotta floors and marble slab floors supported directly on steelwork. Constructed for the Equitable Life Assurance Society of the United States of America, the building is also an expression of the expansion of major American companies into the Australian insurance market in the late Victorian period. The building is significant as the site of the business office from which the pioneer Australian feminist and advocate for female suffrage, Maybanke Wolstenholme, ran both her journal, The Woman's Voice, and the Women's Federation League, an organisation she established in April 1898. The League was the first organisation specifically formed to get women to take an active political role in the wider federation campaign in NSW. The building contains a remarkable steel-framed full-height atrium and fine examples of design and craftsmanship in marble, plaster, steel, bronze and glass. The building makes a major contribution to the streetscape of George Street and lower Martin Place.

348–352 George Street was listed on the New South Wales State Heritage Register on 2 April 1999.

== See also ==
- Australian non-residential architectural styles
- National Mutual Life Building, Brisbane
