= Murrumbidgee River railway bridge, Wagga Wagga =

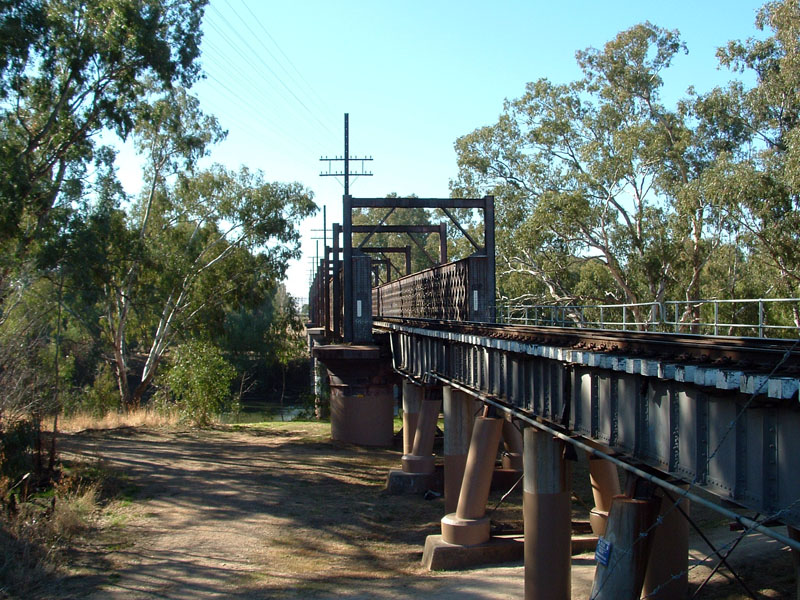
- Original bridge in May 2006
- Coordinates: 35°06′57″S 147°22′58″E
- Carries: Main Southern railway line
- Crosses: Murrumbidgee River
- Locale: Wagga Wagga, Riverina, New South Wales, Australia
- Owner: Transport Asset Manager of New South Wales

Characteristics
- Design: Lattice truss
- Total length: 3,078 metres (10,100 ft)
- Longest span: 4 x 46 metres (150 ft)

Rail characteristics
- Track gauge: 4 ft 8 1/2 in (1,435 mm) standard gauge

History
- Constructed by: Messrs. R. & A. Amos
- Fabrication by: P. & W. McClellan & Co, Scotland
- Construction start: 1871
- Construction end: December 1880
- Opened: 16 January 1881
- Closed: 30 December 2006

Location
- Interactive map of Murrumbidgee River railway bridge, Wagga Wagga

The Murrumbidgee River railway bridge is a former railway bridge that carried the Main Southern railway line across the Murrumbidgee River in Wagga Wagga, Australia. The original bridge, erected in 1881, was replaced in 2006.

== Original bridge ==
The original four span wrought iron lattice truss bridge opened on 16 January 1881. It was the second oldest bridge out of the twelve related wrought iron lattice truss series bridges built in Australia. Each of the four lattice truss spans were 46 metres (150 ft) long which joined onto what was thought to be the longest timber viaduct in Australia. The bridge was considered as of major importance to the history of bridge engineering in Australia.

The spans were manufactured by P. & W. McClellan & Co., Glasgow weighing a combined 790 tonnes (870 short tons). The northern approach was originally built with 215 timber trestles. These were replaced with steel trestles over a four-year period from 1897. The trestles were strengthened in 1994 as part of the One Nation project. By 2000 a 20 km/h (12 mph) speed restriction over the bridge had been imposed.

== Replacement bridge ==
The bridge was removed and replaced with a new concrete bridge during a four-day shut down from 30 December 2006. The wrought iron lattice railway bridge was cut away using oxy cutters. One cut section of the bridge was donated to railway preservation group Tumbarail at Ladysmith. The rest of the bridge was taken to Port Kembla for disposal. The new bridge allowed an 80 km/h (50 mph) speed limit to be introduced.

== Engineering heritage award ==
The bridge received a Historic Engineering Marker from Engineers Australia as part of its Engineering Heritage Recognition Program.

== See also ==
- List of railway bridges in New South Wales
