= Macropod =

Macropod may refer to:

- Macropodidae, a marsupial family which includes kangaroos, wallabies, tree-kangaroos, pademelons, and several others
- Macropodiformes, a marsupial suborder which includes kangaroos, wallabies and allies, bettongs, potoroos, and rat kangaroos

== See also ==
- Macropodia, genus of crabs
- Megapode, chicken-like birds in the family Megapodiidae
