= QBN FM =

Community radio station in Queanbeyan, New South Wales

QBN FM (2QBN)
- Queanbeyan, New South Wales; Australia
- Frequency: 96.7 MHz

Programming
- Language: English
- Format: Community radio

Ownership
- Owner: QBN Inc

History
- First air date: 7 April 2000
- Call sign meaning: Queanbeyan

Technical information
- ERP: 500 watts
- HAAT: 20 m
- Transmitter coordinates: 35.3743°S 149.2154°E

Links
- Website: web.archive.org/web/20130725002920/http://www.qbn967.com.au/

QBN FM 96.7 (call sign: 2QBN) is a community radio station which broadcasts on 96.7MHz from its studios in Crawford Street, Queanbeyan, New South Wales, Australia. The station's staff and presenters are volunteers, and the station operates as a completely non-profit entity.

QBN FM 96.7 has been on air since April 2000 and holds a Community Broadcasting Licence (TCBL). The station is also a full member of the Community Broadcasting Association of Australia (CBAA).

QBN FM plays an array of music including, "Classic Pop and Rock from the 60s till today, Traditional and Contemporary Country, Irish Folk, Nostalgia from the 30s to the 50s, Classical Music" In addition to music, the station features artists local to Australia and abroad.

In 2006 QBN FM was nominated for the award at the 2006 Australian Country Recording Awards. "Australian Country radio Station of the Year"

In 2007, the station was investigated for breaching its community radio license. Complaints included rejecting a number of member applications, discrimination and bad management practices.

In 2010 QBN FM was involved with the promotion of children having a good breakfast at the Karabar High School. This helped to create an awareness of the lack of nutrition children were getting before starting school for the day. This program was a government initiative called "the school breakfast program".

In April 2020, Australian Communications & Media Authority assessed QBN FM's Licence Renewal and decided the licensee had not demonstrated that it had the capacity to provide the service at this time. Following the decision on its long-term licence, QBN FM applied for and has been granted, a temporary community broadcasting licence.
