= Mount Gibraltar =

Mountain in Australia

- Ngunnawal–Gundungurra language: Bowrell
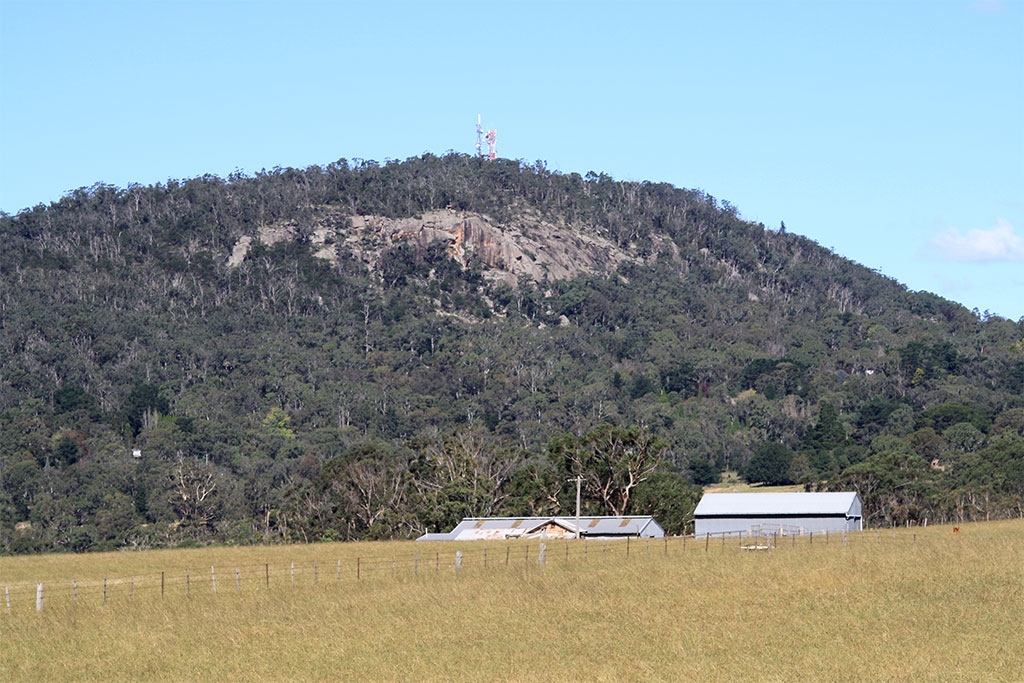
- Mount Gibraltar seen from the west

Highest point
- Elevation: 863 m (2,831 ft)
- Coordinates: 34°27′55.20″S 150°25′41.76″E

Geography
- Location within New South Wales
- Location: Southern Highlands, New South Wales, Australia

Geology
- Rock age: 150 million years

Climbing
- First ascent: (by European), John Wilson, 1798

Mount Gibraltar (Ngunnawal–Gundungurra language: Bowrell) is a mountain with an elevation of 863 metres (2,831 ft) AHD that is located in the Southern Highlands region, between Bowral and Mittagong, in New South Wales, Australia. Further west is Berrima.

== Location and features ==
The mountain is locally known as 'The Gib', and is in the form of a ridge, rather than an obvious conical peak. The western extremity of the ridge is commonly pointed out as the mountain itself. 'The Gib' is primarily a residential area with a large nature reserve at its peak.

The first European to climb the mountain, in 1798, was explorer John Wilson. He learned from local Aborigines the name 'Bowrell', which meant 'a high place'. Surveyor Sir Thomas Mitchell also climbed Mount Gibraltar.

- 'The Gib' is thought to have been formed from a collapsed volcanic core, which pushed through the local Hawkesbury Sandstone beds about 150 million years ago.
- The western slopes were previously the site of a granite quarry which mined the volcanic trachyte; the quarry closed in 1986. The site can be reached by a walking track beginning near Bowral Swimming Pool.
- The peak is 863 metres above sea-level.
- It is part of the range forming the watershed between the Wingecarribee/Wollondilly and Nattai rivers. The range to the north of Mt Gibraltar was formerly called the Merrigong Range and the range to the south-east, the Mittagong Range.
- The peak area includes the Mount Gibraltar Reserve.
- The Reserve was acquired by Alderman Joshua Stokes, in 1919. A large stone construction, bearing a memorial plaque to Stokes, is a feature of the Reserve.
- The Reserve vegetation is a rare remnant of a volcanic soil community. A prominent tree species is Eucalyptus fastigata (Brown Barrel).
- The Reserve has been the subject of a Landcare Bush Regeneration Program since 1994, with the aim of eliminating introduced species such as Privet, Barberry, Ivy, Honeysuckle, Banana Passionfruit, Inkweed and others.
- The Landcare group has also compiled a complete Site Species List.
- 'The Gib' has three lookout points over Bowral and Mittagong.
- On a clear day 'The Gib' can be seen from Echo Point in Katoomba which is approximately 70–80 km away, although many people confuse it with the nearby, conical Mount Jellore.
- On a very clear day the Sydney skyline can be seen.
- The exposed, rocky area of the peak is the site of several telecommunications and broadcasting towers, including Telstra microwave transmission links.
- The residential area of Mount Gibraltar includes some of the most highly priced real estate in the Southern Highlands.

The former Mount Gibraltar Trachyte Quarries Complex was added to the New South Wales State Heritage Register on 2 December 2013.

== Railway ==
The Main South Railway skirts Mount Gibraltar at its western foothills, passing through a tunnel under Evans Street, Bowral. The original tunnel was single track, but it was replaced in the 1920s by a double track tunnel.

== Gallery ==
Mount Gibraltar images

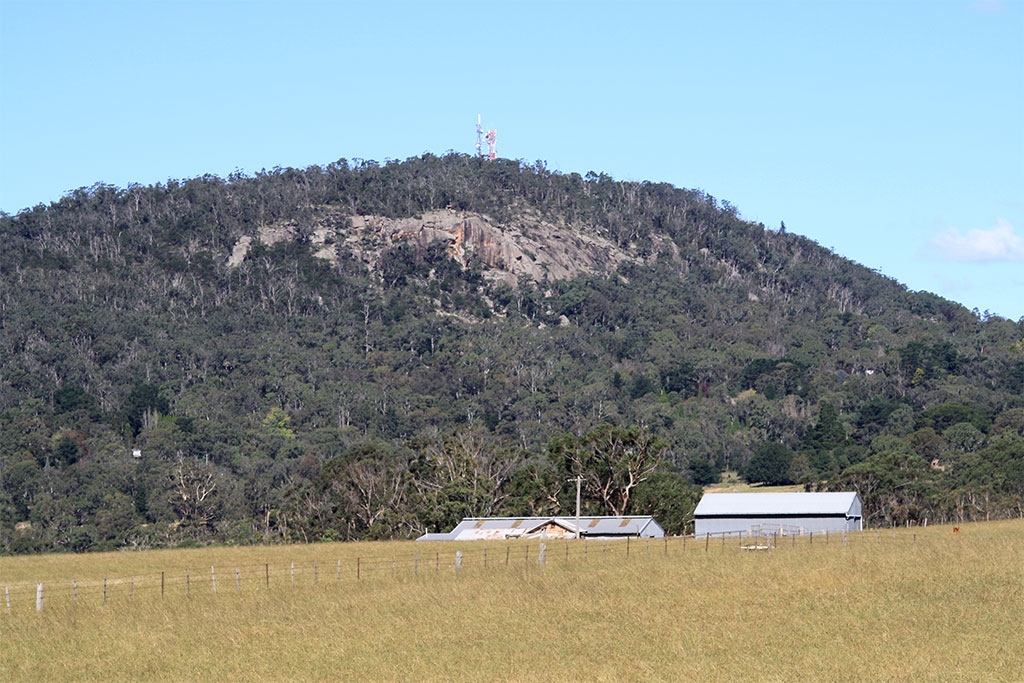
Western extremity, looking eastwards from Welby.

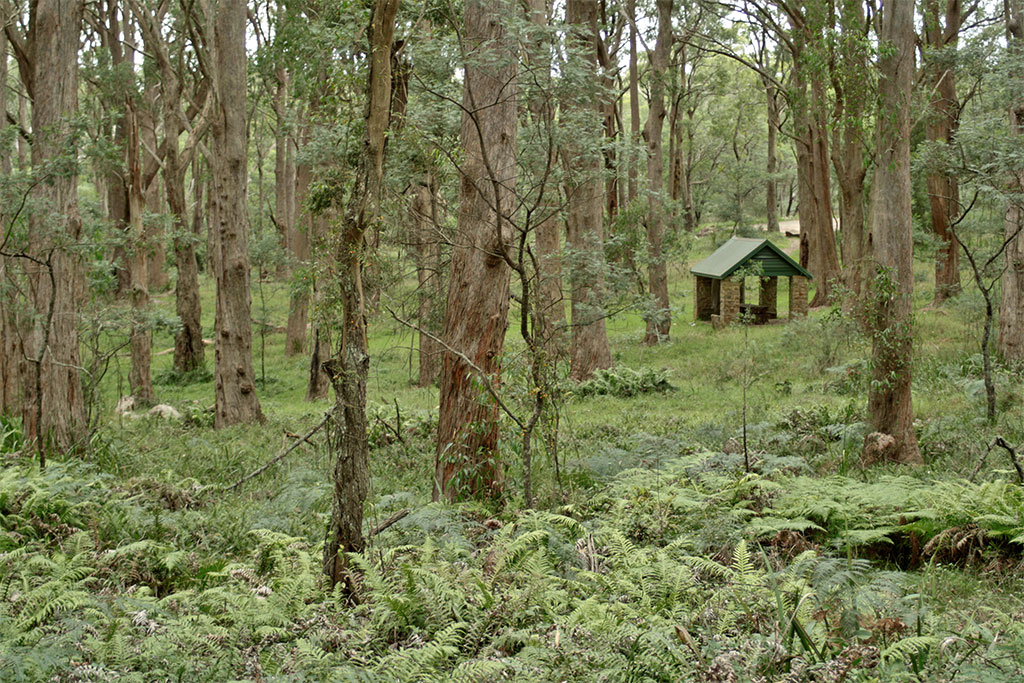
Inner Bowl Picnic Area

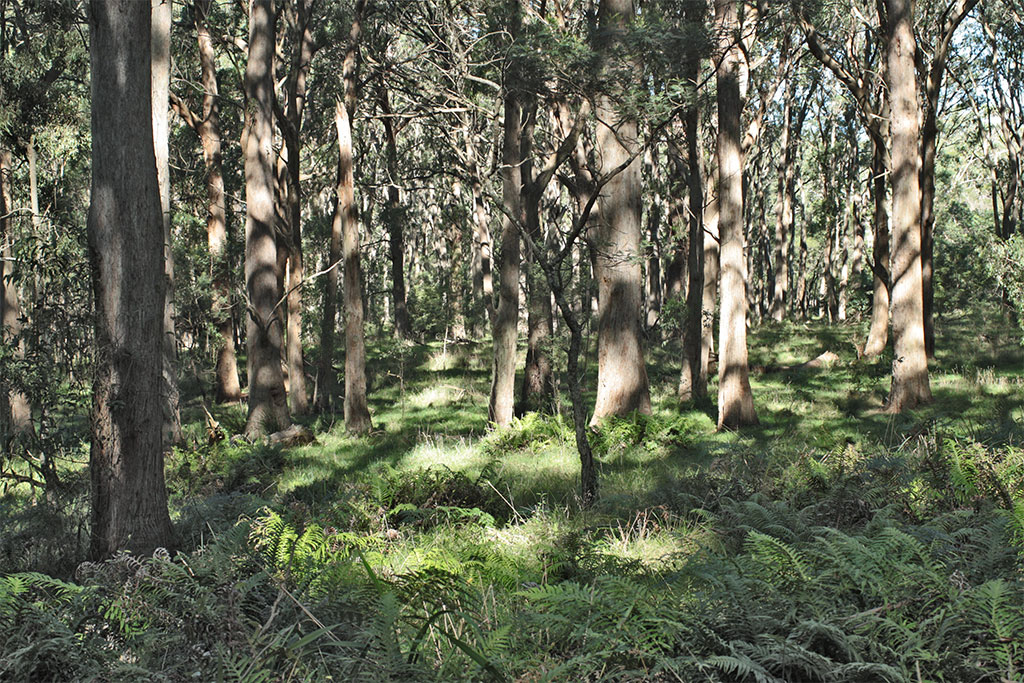
Dense stands of timber, Inner Bowl

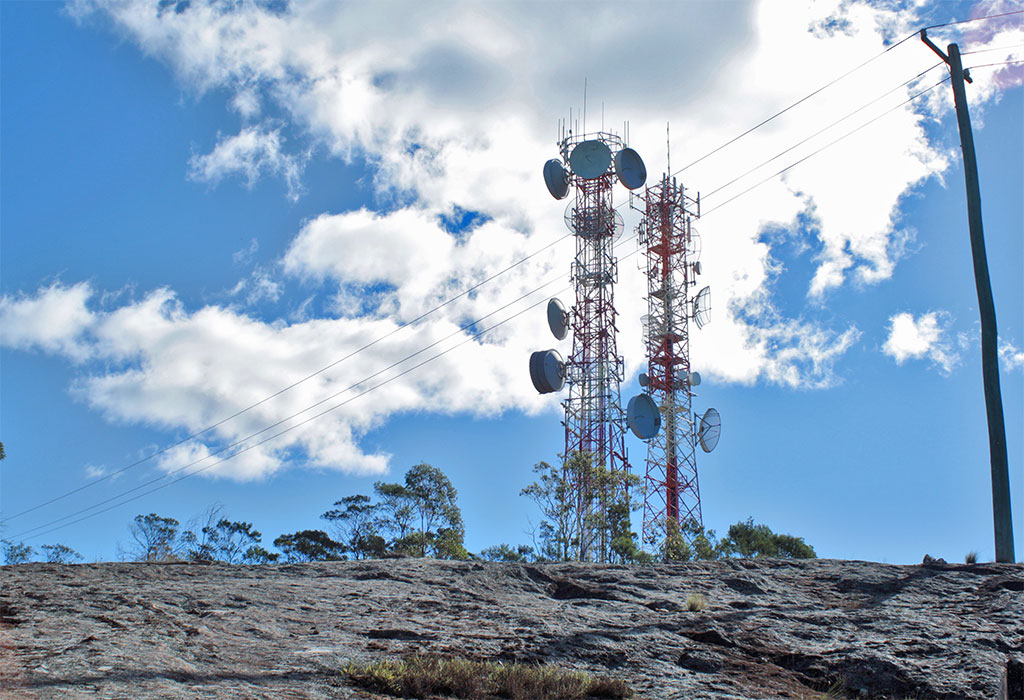
Telecommunications towers

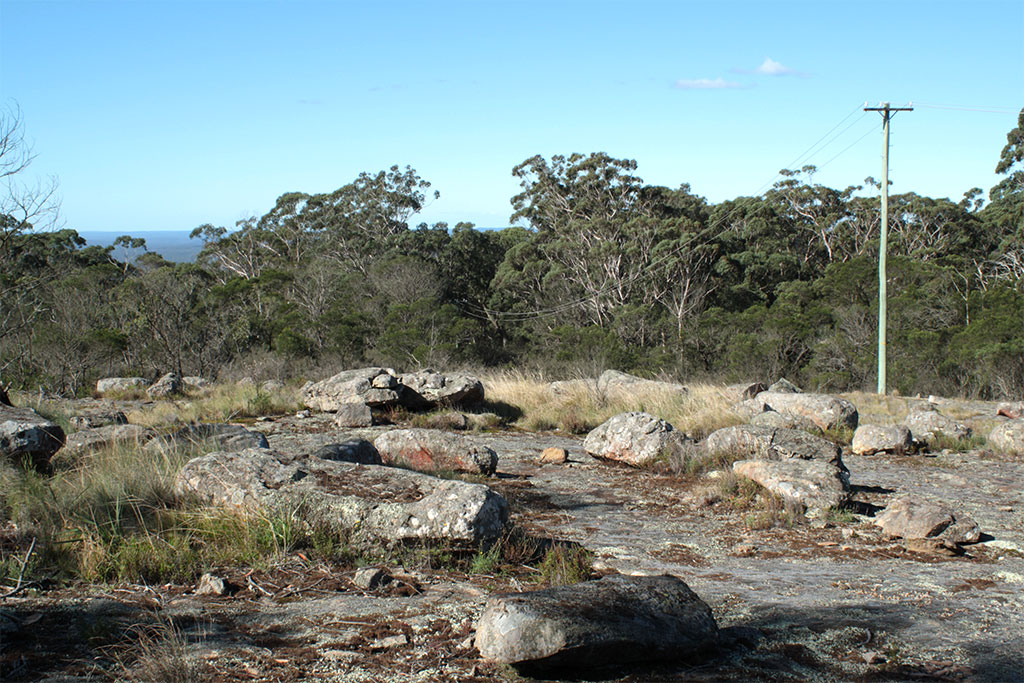
Igneous rock exposed at peak

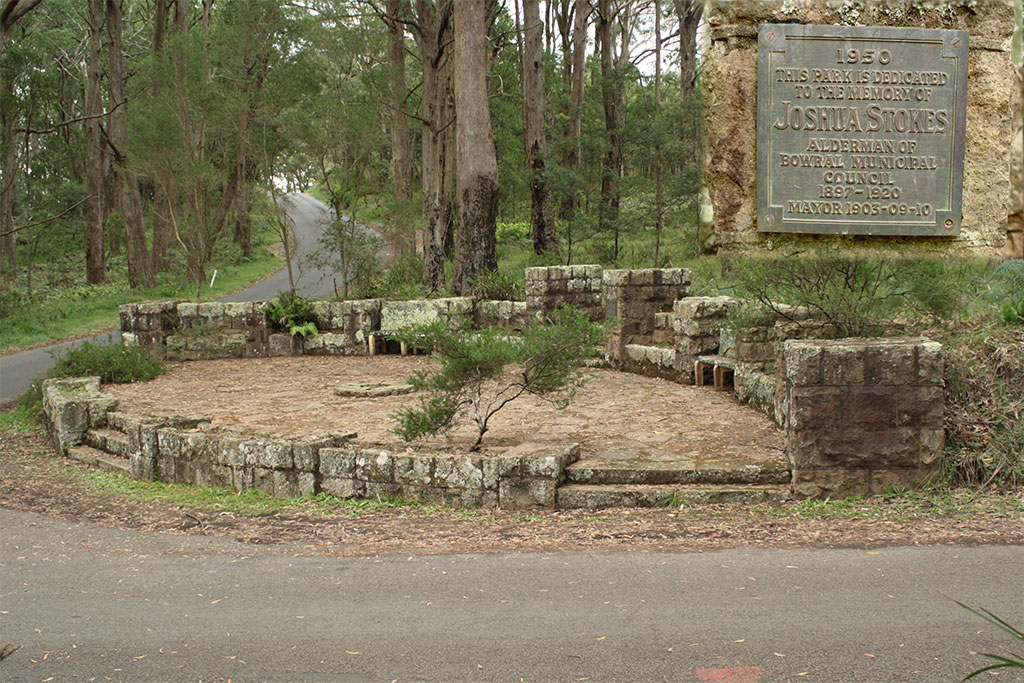
Memorial to Joshua Stokes

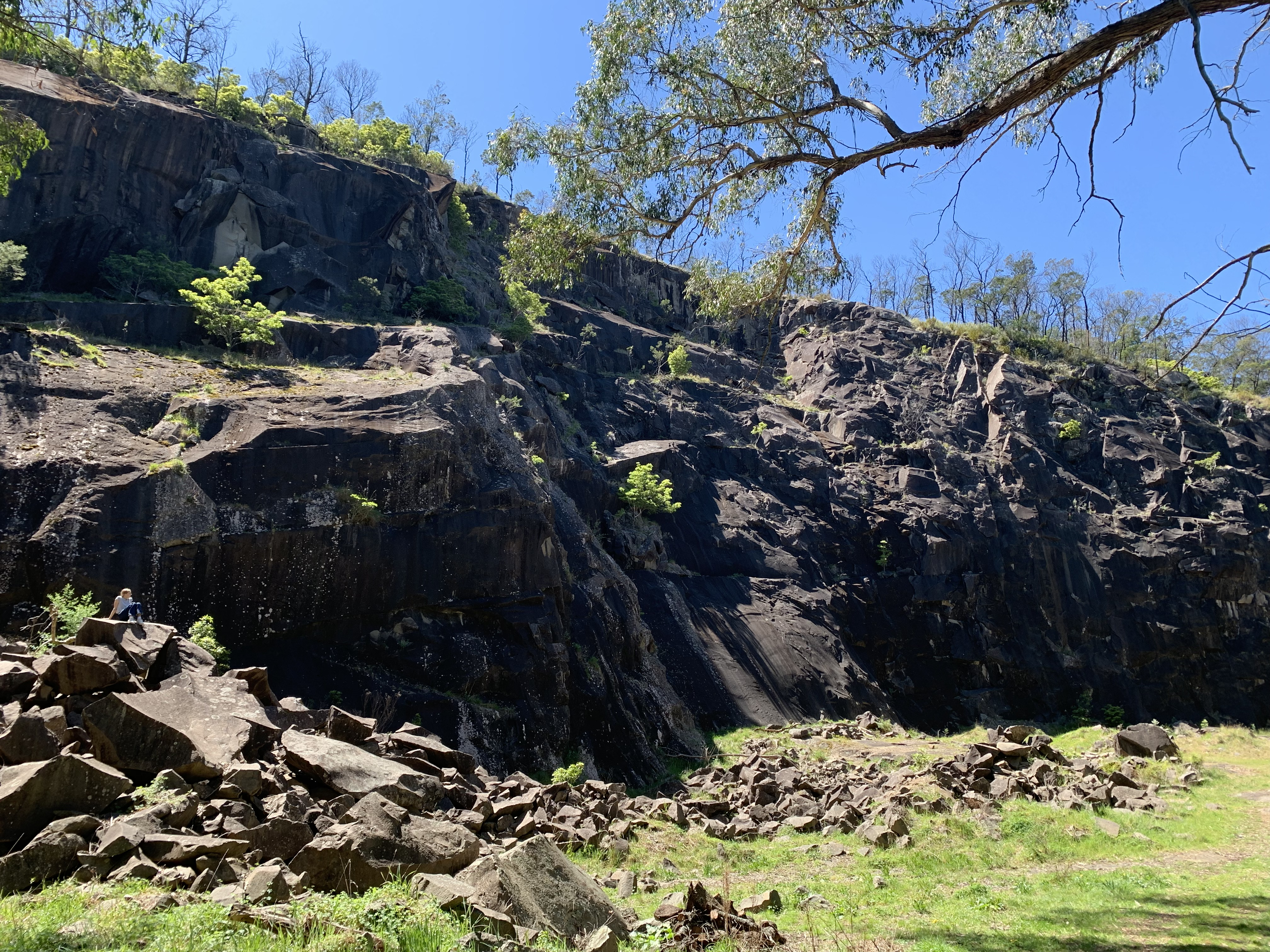
Mount Gibraltar trachyte quarry
