= Energy in Victoria =

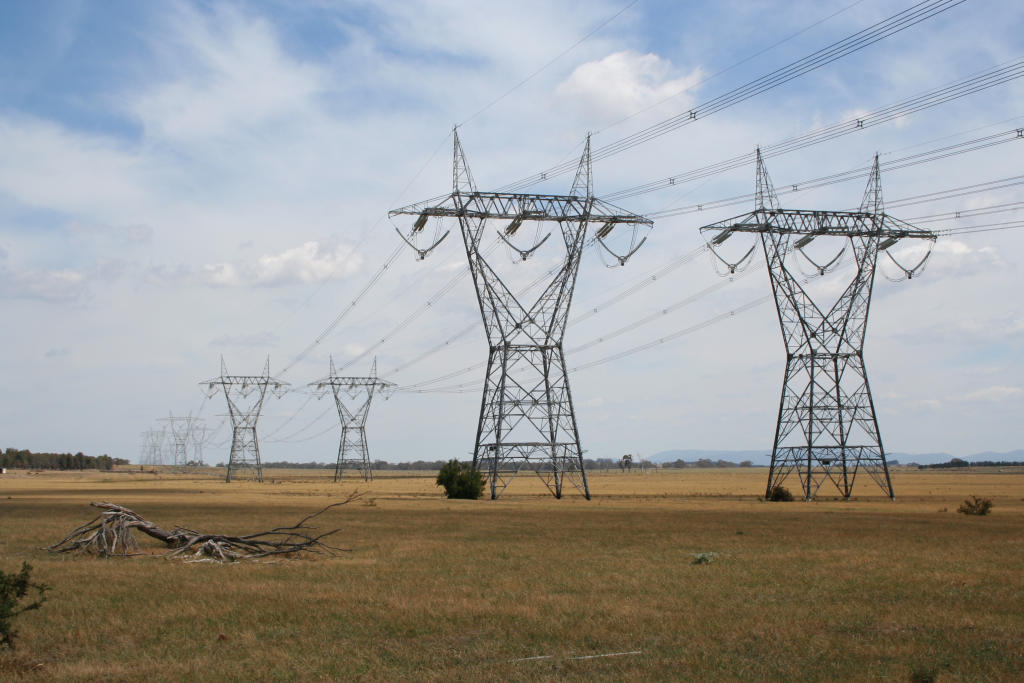
500 kilovolt transmission lines to the north of Melbourne

Energy in Victoria, Australia is generated using a number of fuels or technologies, including coal, natural gas and renewable energy sources. Brown coal, historically, was the main primary energy source for the generation of electricity in the state, accounting for about 85% of electricity generation in 2008. The amount of coal-fired power has decreased significantly with the closure in 2017 of the Hazelwood Power Station which supplied around 20% of Victoria's electricity, and to a lesser extent with the exit of Anglesea Power Station in 2015. Brown coal is one of the largest contributors to Australia's total domestic greenhouse gas emissions and a source of controversy for the country. Australia is one of the highest polluters of greenhouse gas per capita in the world.

In 2020, the Greenhouse gas co-efficient for Victoria as advised by the Essential Services Commission was 1.13 kg CO_{2}-e/kWh, making it the highest CO_{2} co-efficient for electricity generation in Australia.

Renewable energy supplies are a rapidly increasing fraction of Victoria's electricity. In 2021, 33% of electricity generation was from renewable sources. In 2022, the state government announced a target to increase that to 95% by 2035.

== History ==
=== Electricity ===
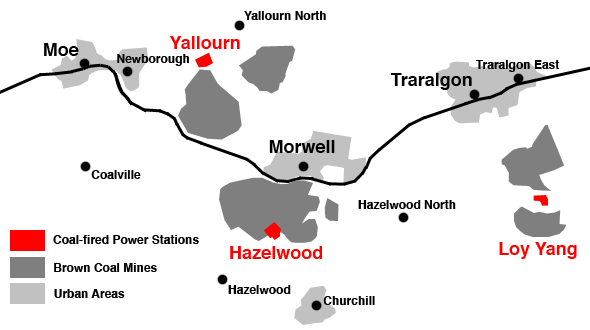
A map of major urban areas, coal-fired power stations and mines in the Latrobe Valley

The first electricity supplies to Melbourne were generated and distributed by a number of private companies and municipal generator and distribution companies. The main municipal-owned power station in Victoria was operated by the Melbourne City Council, which generated electricity from its Spencer Street Power Station, which opened in 1892, for the city's residents, as well as being a wholesale supplier to other municipal distributors. The main privately owned company was the Melbourne Electric Supply Company which was established in 1899. The company operated the Richmond Power Station, which had been opened in 1891, and the Geelong Power Station. It operated under franchise arrangements with a number of municipal distributors. The final major generator of electricity was the Victorian Railways which in 1918 opened the Newport Power Station, the largest power station in the urban area, to supply electricity as part of the electrification of Melbourne's suburban trains. These early generators all relied on fuel supplies from the strike prone black coal industry of New South Wales.

Early electricity production in Victoria used relatively simple technology, but transmission over even a short distance was difficult. Initially, it was used only for public events - such as the Duke of Edinburgh's visit in 1867 and a night football match at the Melbourne Cricket Ground in 1879 - and lighting in the theatre. Small scale generating plants were built in Melbourne to serve small areas and industries. However, gas remained the fuel for street lighting in Melbourne until 1894, after the construction of the Spencer Street Power Station by the Melbourne City Council. This power station generated enough power to light Melbourne's streets. Other councils embraced Melbourne's initiative and streets in many nearby areas - such as Richmond, Essendon, Hawthorn and South Yarra - were also lit by electricity by the late 1890s. Some councils set up their own distribution networks, including Footscray (1911), Brunswick (1912–13), Port Melbourne (1912–13), Preston (1912), Nunawading (1912), Northcote (1912), Coburg (1914), Heidelberg (1914), Williamstown (1915–16) and Doncaster (1916).

The State Electricity Commission of Victoria (SECV) was formed in 1921 to merge these small operations.^{[b]} In the 1920s the SECV investigated hydroelectric power generation, in parallel with work on brown coal fired power stations at Yallourn. In 1922 a report was delivered by Messrs J.M. and H.E. Coane relating to the development of potential hydro-electric power on the Goulburn River and the Cerberean Range. Their findings were then submitted to the Parliament of Victoria for funding, with the more cost effective project approved in 1922, and the Rubicon Hydroelectric Scheme commenced in that year. For the first ten years of its operation it supplied on average 16.9% of electricity generated by the SECV.

The SECV took over a number of small municipal electricity distributors during the 1920s, and in the 1930s the Melbourne Electric Supply Company was acquired along with its street tramway operations. Despite these acquisitions, municipal controlled distribution companies known as Municipal Electricity Undertakings (MEUs) in the inner urban areas of Melbourne remained outside of SECV control until the privatisation of the industry in the 1990s.

The first electric tram in Melbourne was built in 1889 by the Box Hill and Doncaster Tramway Company Limited, an enterprise which failed in 1896. Electric trams returned in 1906, with the opening of the Victorian Railways' Electric Street Railway from St Kilda to Brighton, and was followed in the same year with the opening of the North Melbourne Electric Tramway & Lighting Company system, which opened two lines from the cable tram terminus at Flemington Bridge to Essendon and Saltwater River (now Maribyrnong River). The NMELT was an electricity and tramway company that operated from 1906 to 1922. The electricity section was taken over by the SECV in 1922. The Melbourne & Metropolitan Tramways Board (MMTB) was formed in 1919 and took over all cable and electric trams in Melbourne. The MMTB extended the electric lines, and from 1924 progressively converted the existing cable system to electric traction. By 1940 all Melbourne cable tram had been converted to electric traction. The electrification of the Melbourne railway network took place in the 1920s.

The SECV built the open cut mine in the Latrobe Valley and opened the first of many brown coal fired power stations in the Latrobe Valley. Yallourn Power Station was built progressively from the 1920s to the 1960s. Since then the SECV opened two more open cut mines in the valley, feeding power stations at Hazelwood and Loy Yang.

The responsibilities of the SECV were privatised between 1995 and 1999. In 1936, Geelong was connected to the state electrical grid, and by the 1960s Geelong A had closed. Geelong B remained for a few more years being used for peak loads only, but closed in 1970 due to the much higher efficiency of the new power stations in the Latrobe Valley. Richmond Power Station closed in 1976 and Spencer Street Power Station closed in 1982. Newport Power Station closed in the 1980s. Hazelwood Power Station closed in 2017.

On 10 March 2021, EnergyAustralia announced that it will close the Yallourn Power Station in mid-2028, four years ahead of schedule, and instead build a 350-megawatt power-generating battery in the Latrobe Valley by the end of 2026. At the time, Yallourn produced about 20% of Victoria's electricity. Minister for Energy Lily D'Ambrosio said she anticipated by mid-2028 an influx of renewable energy into the national energy grid. When Engie shut down the Hazelwood Power Station in March 2017, with only six months’ notice, wholesale prices in Victoria were up 85% on 2016, according to the Australian Energy Regulator, and for the first time in almost a decade, the state relied on energy from interstate to meet its needs.

In the lead-up to the 2022 Victorian state election, Labor Premier Daniel Andrews committed to reviving the State Electricity Commission if re-elected. The government would have a 51% shareholding in the new State Electricity Commission.

Andrews committed to amending the state’s constitution to protect public ownership of the revived State Electricity Commission if re-elected, to make it harder, although not impossible, for it to be privatised again in the future. Re-privatising the commission after such legislation would require a "special majority" of 60% of both the Legislative Assembly and Legislative Council, a situation which already exists for any potential privatisation of water services in Victoria under the Constitution of Victoria.

== Electricity generation ==
Electricity generation by fuel type in Victoria, Australia, 2015-2021

Victoria is a participant in the National Electricity Market, and the Victorian electricity grid has substantial interconnections with New South Wales (through multiple land-based connectors), Tasmania (through Basslink) and South Australia (through the Heywood Interconnector). Victoria has historically been a net exporter of electricity, though interstate trade generally represents a relatively small proportion of total energy generation.

=== Coal-fired generators ===
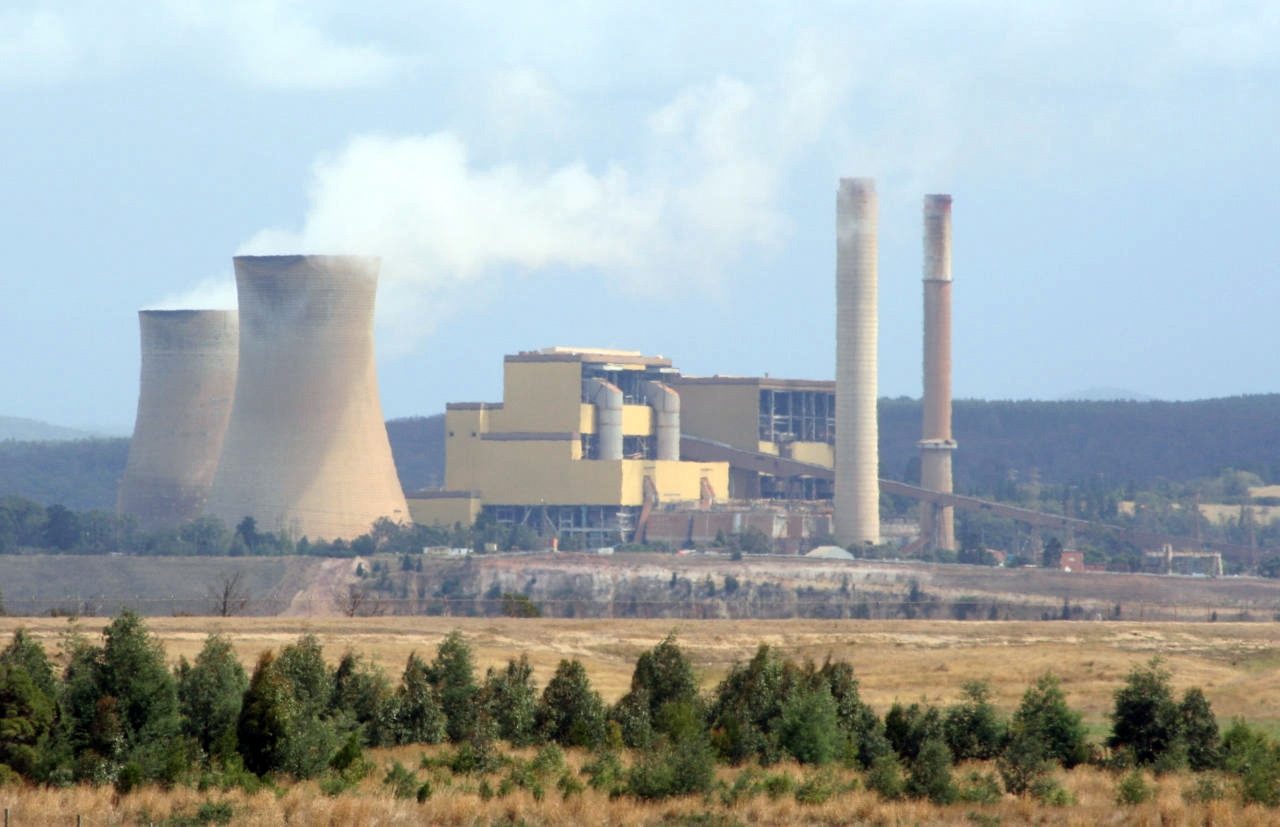
Yallourn W Power Station viewed from the south

As of 2022, the majority of electricity in Victoria is generated by three brown coal-fired thermal power stations in the Latrobe Valley: Loy Yang A and B, and Yallourn. Originally commissioned by the SECV, they were privatised by the Kennett government in 1995 along the rest of Victoria's generation and distribution infrastructure.

The largest single electricity consumer in Victoria is the Portland aluminium smelter.

Unlike many other states, the major coalfields of Victoria contain brown coal. The high water content of this coal makes it less suited for combustion without specialised technology. As a result, in the early years of Victoria the state was dependent on black coal imports from New South Wales for its fuel needs. In general, Latrobe Valley brown coal has a low ash content. The ash constituents vary significantly across the region but various silicates and oxides (Mg, Fe, Al, Ca and Na) are typical.

In the 1920s the Latrobe Valley coalfields began to be exploited for power generation.

Additional brown coal reserves were at Altona, and Anglesea, and black coal in the Strzelecki Ranges in South Gippsland. Both the Altona and Strzelecki Ranges coalfields were small in size, and required underground mining. Production in these mines increased into the early 20th century. The Anglesea coalfield has been mined for Alcoa's Anglesea Power Station since the 1960s, before both the power station and coalfield were shut in 2015. The amount of coal-fired power has decreased significantly with the closure in 2017 of the Hazelwood Power Station which supplied around 20% of Victoria's electricity consumption, and to a lesser extent with the exit of Anglesea Power Station in 2015.

In 2013/14, the Latrobe Valley produced 98.5% of Australia's total brown coal production at 57.8 Mt, down from 66.7 Mt in 2001/02.

Coal mines in Victoria operating in 2019 are:

Mine	Location	Owner	Lat & Long	Type of Coal	Tons Mined PA	Major Buyers	Major Method
Yallourn	Yallourn	EnergyAustralia	-38.183,146.384	Lignite	?	Yallourn Power Station	Open Cut
Loy Yang "A"	Traralgon	AGL Energy Loy Yang	-38.232,146.571	Lignite	?	Loy Yang Power Station	Open Cut

A short-lived carbon pricing system was introduced by the federal government in 2011 and repealed in 2014, so the high emissions intensity of the brown coal plants does not result in any direct financial difficulties for their owners. However, as in most of the world, new-build coal plants are financially unattractive compared to renewable energy.

Yallourn power station is scheduled to close in 2028. Loy Yang A and B are currently scheduled to operate into the 2040s, according to their owners; however, observers expect Loy Yang's retirement to be accelerated due to competition from renewables and future government policy to reduce emissions.

=== Renewable energy ===
In 2006, Victoria was the first state to have a renewable energy target of 10% by 2016. In 2010, the target was increased to 25% by 2020.

The Victorian government has set renewable energy targets of 40% by 2025. In 2021, 33% of all power generation in Victoria was from renewable sources.

==== Hydro ====
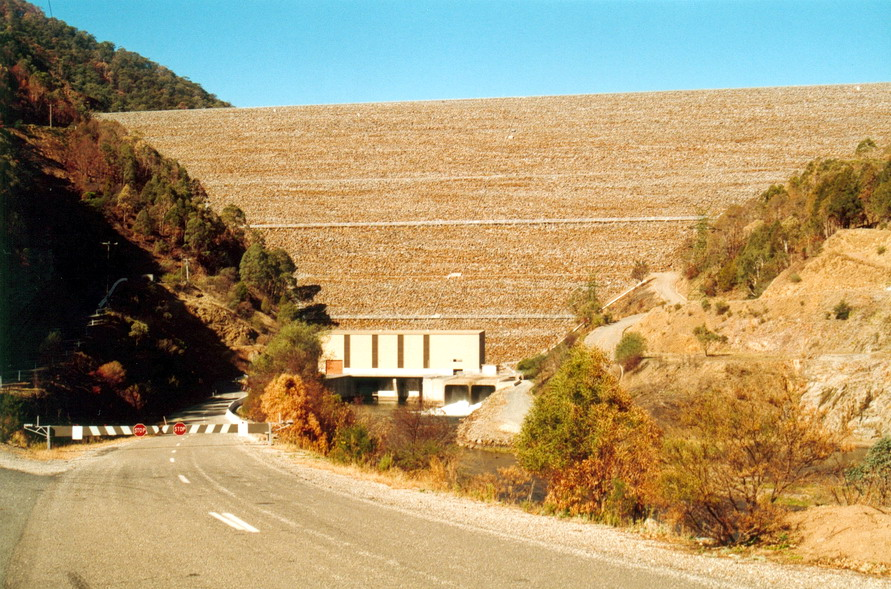
Dartmouth Dam wall and power station

Victoria has a limited hydroelectric power generation system due to the limited water resources.

The Rubicon Hydroelectric Scheme was completed by the SECV in 1924, and was an important component of the state electrical grid at the time. It was later followed by the Kiewa Hydroelectric Scheme that was constructed between 1938 and 1961, the Eildon Power Station in 1956, Victoria's involvement in the Snowy Mountains Scheme that was built from the 1950s to 1970s, and the Dartmouth Power Station in 1981. The most recent expansion of hydropower in Victoria was the Bogong Power Station, a 95 MW extension to the Kiewa scheme completed in 2009.

There are currently no proposals for the expansion of hydroelectric power in Victoria. The Snowy 2.0 pumped storage scheme in NSW will provide additional dispatchable hydroelectricity through interstate electricity interconnections.

==== Solar ====
Solar energy usage has been growing very rapidly in Victoria, of which the majority is small-scale grid-connected rooftop solar generation. In 2021, 10% of all electricity generation was solar energy, up from 1.7% in 2015.

There are over 600,000 small-scale solar systems (defined as less than 100 kW of nameplate capacity) installed in the state as of mid-2022. They generated about 8.5% of Victoria's total electricity generation in 2021. Australia's small-scale residential and commercial solar systems are amongst the cheapest in the developed world, excluding subsidies, and there have been a variety of state and federal subsidies to support households and businesses purchasing solar systems.

As of June 2022, there are 15 larger-scale solar farms operating in Victoria, with a nameplate capacity of 695.2 MW, and five more, with a capacity of 710 MW, are under construction. Many more are planned.

==== Wind ====
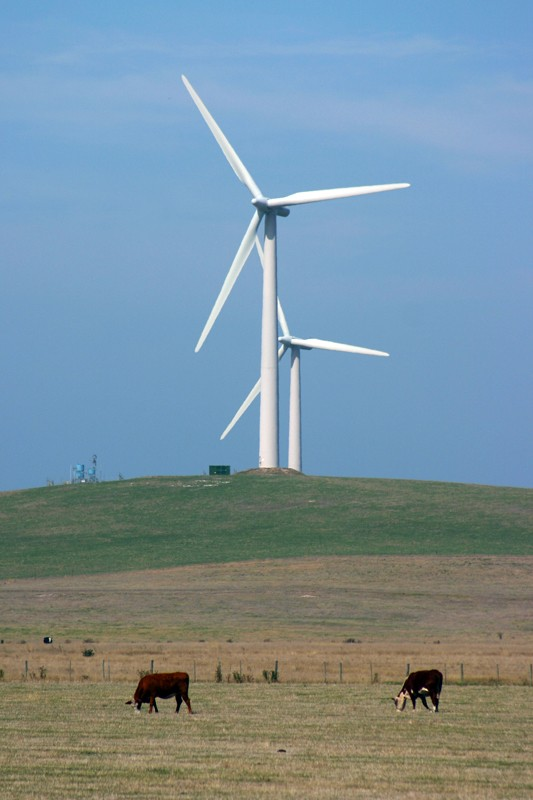
Windfarm outside Port Fairy

Trials of wind power in Victoria commenced in 1987, when the State Electricity Commission of Victoria erected a 60 kW capacity Westwind wind generator at Breamlea as a demonstration project. The generator was sold to a private group in 1994 with the privatisation of the SECV. It was not until the early 2000s that the commercial use of wind power for electricity commenced. Wind farms at Codrington, Challicum Hills and Portland were all built by private companies with State Government funding assistance.

By October 2011 there were eight operating wind farms with 428 MW of capacity. The development of new wind farms in Victoria became much harder following the election of the Baillieu government who amended the planning scheme in August 2011 to give any landholder within two kilometres a power of veto over a project. This was an unprecedented planning doctrine and according to wind power companies, this change threatened the viability of investment in the state.

Despite these obstacles and difficulties with grid connection, wind generation has continued to expand in Victoria. As of June 2022, there was approximately 3.6 GW of wind generation capacity in Victoria. Wind was the source of approximately 16.3% of electricity generated in Victoria in 2021. 862 MW of additional capacity was listed as "in commissioning" as of June 2022.

The majority of Victoria's wind farms are located in south-western Victoria, with a few in south Gippsland.

As of 2022, Victoria does not have any offshore wind generation. The state government has committed to purchasing at least 2 GW of offshore wind capacity by 2032, with longer-term targets of 4 GW by 2035 and 9 GW by 2040. Three project proposals for offshore wind farms along the Gippsland coastline have received preliminary funding for design and feasibility work.

=== Battery storage ===
There are four large-scale battery storage systems in Victoria. By far the largest to date is the Victorian Big Battery, a 300 MW/450 MWh battery storage facility which was connected to the Victorian electricity grid in 2021.

== Wood and other biomass ==
Wood-burning stoves are widely used in Victoria, though quantitative estimates are less accurate due to the lack of any centralized distribution network for wood. One survey estimated that approximately 28% of Victorians used wood heating, with usage higher outside metropolitan areas and amongst less well-off households. Limited quantities of firewood can be collected for personal use from some state-managed forest areas at no cost. There are also numerous commercial firewood collectors who contract to harvest firewood from publicly managed forests and private land.

There have been calls for "buy-back" schemes to remove wood heaters, due to the health effects of the air pollution from them.

Aside from wood domestic heating, the other major form of biomass energy used in Victoria is the burning of wood waste from sawmills, both for process heat for wood treatment and for electricity production. Some of this is exported to the grid.

E10 fuel, generally made from bioethanol imported from interstate or overseas, is widely available in Victoria, though most petrol stations also sell petrol that is not blended with ethanol.

== Briquettes ==
Due to the low energy value of raw brown coal, long-distance transport of the fuel was not economic. As a result, the State Electricity Commission of Victoria used German technology to produce hard briquettes from Latrobe Valley brown coal. The initial plant was established in the 1920s at Yallourn, with a second opening at Morwell in the 1940s. These plants crushed, dried and pressed brown coal to extract the water, and form a hard fast-burning block that was easy to transport.

The SECV encouraged the use of briquettes in both industrial and domestic cooking and heating, as a replacement for imported black coal. Briquettes were also used in a number of peak load thermal power stations that were located away from the Latrobe Valley. Briquette usage in Victoria dropped after the introduction of natural gas to the state, but the Morwell Energy Brix factory continued in operation until August 2014.

== Gas ==
=== History ===
Town gas was initially supplied to Melbourne by private companies such as the Metropolitan Gas Company from the 1850s, and the Brighton Gas Company which was floated in 1877, and others, all of which operated their own small gasworks which converted black coal into gas, with gasworks being scattered throughout the suburbs. Town gas was used for lighting, heating, and cooking, and replaced kerosene for lighting. It was also used for street lighting before electricity became available starting in the 1890s.

The Gas and Fuel Corporation of Victoria was formed in 1951 to manage gas supplies for the state. It took over Metropolitan Gas Company and Brighton Gas Company and over time also acquired the other local municipal and company gas works.

Its first project was the building of a centralised brown coal gasification plant at Morwell. The plant opened in 1956 and used the German Lurgi process to produce gas that was transferred to Melbourne via a high pressure gas pipeline. The production of town gas was changed in the late 1950s when Syngas production was developed, a process that converted waste gases from oil refineries to a useful energy product.

The search for natural gas in Bass Strait off Gippsland commenced in the mid-1960s by Esso Australia and BHP. The floating rig Glomar III was used for exploration drilling, which begun on 27 December 1964. After two months gas was struck, and by June 1965 it was confirmed that a major gas field had been found. Known as the Barracouta field, discovery of the Marlin field followed in March 1966. Both of these fields use offshore drilling rigs as a production base. The Longford gas plant acted as the onshore receiving point for oil and natural gas output from production platforms in Bass Strait. By 1969 the production plant and distribution network were complete, allowing natural gas to be sold to consumers. A majority of Victoria consumers converting gas appliances to natural gas by the 1970s.

VENCorp was established in 1997. In 1994, the Kennett government privatised the distribution, retail and transmission companies, along with the State Electricity Commission of Victoria, Victoria's main electricity utility. The G&FC was wound up in June 1995. Gascor acted as a gas wholesaler, purchasing gas from Esso/BHP-Billiton and on-selling it to private sector gas retailers Origin Energy, AGL and TXU. In March 1999, Envestra (now Australian Gas Networks) acquired part of the former Corporation's distribution network.

Until 1 October 2002, each retailer supplied gas in a defined geographical area, and from that date the gas market in Victoria was opened to new gas retailers and full retail contestability for gas customers was introduced, enabling gas retailers to seek customers state-wide. At that time, there were three retailers, which continued to be the major retailers. Full retail price deregulation occurred in 2009. Victoria Electricity (later Lumo Energy) applied for and obtained a gas retailing licence in December 2004 and commenced gas retailing in early 2005.

In 2005, TXU sold its Australian assets to Singapore Power, which retained the distribution businesses (electricity and natural gas distribution networks) in Victoria, and onsold the remainder. Singapore Power then floated 49% of the business as SP Ausnet, retaining 51%. In May 2013, Singapore Power sold 19.9% of its 51% stake in the business to State Grid Corporation of China. SP AusNet changed its name to AusNet Services in August 2014. In September 2014, Hong Kong-based Cheung Kong Group bought all the shares in Envestra, including APA's 33.4% stake, while APA retained the operation and management of Envestra's assets until 2027. In October 2014 Envestra's name was changed to Australian Gas Networks Limited.

In September 1998, the Esso Longford gas explosion took place in which two workers died and eight were injured, and resulted in gas supplies in the state being severely affected for two weeks.

Additional gas reserves were discovered in the Otway Basin offshore from the Otway Ranges in recent years. BHP discovered the Minerva gas field 1993, with production commencing in 2004. The Santos Limited operated Casino field was discovered in 2002, and started production in 2006. In 2002 Woodside Energy prepared to develop their Geographe and Thylacine gas fields. These newer gas fields use undersea wellheads connected to the shore and production facilities with pipelines, minimising the visual impact on the coastline.

=== Current structure ===
Today approximately 1.5 million domestic customers in Victoria are supplied with gas via over 25,000 kilometres of mains. Industrial and commercial consumers account for nearly 50% of gas sales. In the 2005/2006 fiscal year, the average gas production in Victoria was over 700 million cubic feet (20,000,000 m^{3}) per day and represented 18% of the total national gas sales, with demand growing at 2% a year.

Victorian households have the second-highest usage (per household) of natural gas in Australia, with only the Australian Capital Territory having higher household consumption. This is the result of wide availability of gas and colder winter weather than other Australian mainland states.

Gas supplies come from offshore Bass Strait gas fields - Gippsland, Otway and Bass basins. The Longford gas plant, the onshore receiving point for oil and natural gas output from production platforms in Bass Strait off Gippsland, is currently owned by a joint partnership between ExxonMobil and BHP, and is the primary provider of natural gas to Victoria, and also provides some supply to New South Wales and Tasmania. The Dandenong LNG gas storage facility provides flexibility to the east Australian gas market, by hedging against risks such as outages or emergencies and peak demand periods. The Iona underground storage, near Port Campbell. Cooper Basin Gas (and Queensland and NSW coal seam gas) via the MSP and NSW-Victoria Interconnect also provides gas for the Victorian market. Following campaigns by rural communities and environmentalists the Victorian state government banned onshore unconventional gas exploration, including fracking and coal seam gas, in 2016.

Australian Gas Networks owns most of the transmission pipelines in Victoria. Gas Pipelines Victoria Pty Ltd owns the transmission pipeline from Carisbrook to Horsham.

The gas distributors in Victoria include:

- AusNet Services — 31.1% owned by Singapore Power, 19.9% by State Grid Corporation of China and the other 49% is publicly owned.
- Jemena — 60% owned by State Grid Corporation of China and 40% by Singapore Power. Its VicHub, which was commissioned in January 2003, is an interconnect facility situated at the Longford Compressor Station which enables gas to flow bi-directionally between the Eastern Gas Pipeline and the Victorian gas transmission system. The Eastern Gas Pipeline, also owned by Jemena, is a supply pipeline between the Gippsland Basin, Victoria and New South Wales. The pipeline supplies more than half the gas consumed in New South Wales, including Sydney, Canberra and Wollongong, and regional centres Bairnsdale, Cooma, Nowra and Bomaderry.
- Australian Gas Networks — owned by Hong Kong-based Cheung Kong Infrastructure (CKI).
- Multinet Gas — owned by the DUET Group, now owned by CKI.

Today, there are 18 energy retailers in Victoria, nine of which are also gas retailers. The major retailers are AGL Energy, EnergyAustralia (formerly TRU), and Origin Energy (representing almost 30% of Australian east coast domestic gas market demand); with the others being Alinta, Dodo, Lumo Energy, Momentum Energy, Red Energy, and Simply Energy. The retailers issue bills to its customers based on gas usage information provided by the distributors.

The Tasmanian Gas Pipeline was constructed and commissioned by Duke Energy in 2002. It is a 734 kilometres (456 mi) submarine and onshore gas pipeline which transports natural gas from the Longford gas plant, under Bass Strait, to Bell Bay, Tasmania. Tasmanian Gas Pipeline (TGP) Pty Ltd is the owner and licensee of the Tasmanian Gas Pipeline. In April 2004 Alinta acquired Duke Energy's assets in Australia and New Zealand. In Tasmania, the gas fueled the Bell Bay and Tamar Valley power stations until the completion of Basslink made them redundant.

To increase the security of natural gas supply to Adelaide, natural gas from EnergyAustralia's Victorian Otway Basin is piped from the Iona Gas Plant near Port Campbell, and Origin Energy's Otway Gas Plant, via the 687 km SEAGas pipeline to the gas-fired Pelican Point Power Station at Port Adelaide. The pipeline is owned and operated by South East Australia Gas Pty Ltd which is owned in a 50-50 partnership by APA Group and the Rest Super.

Production from the Bass Strait fields is declining, and AEMO has stated that Victoria, New South Wales, and Tasmania may face gas shortages during the 2020s. A floating LNG import terminal at Corio Bay has been proposed by Viva Energy as a way to cover the shortfall. The proposed terminal has been opposed on environmental and safety grounds.

=== Phaseout plan ===
The Victorian state government has announced a roadmap to gradually phase out the use of natural gas due to supply, cost, and environmental issues, to be replaced with a mixture of electrification, biogas, and hydrogen from clean sources. Modeling for the roadmap suggests that electrification is likely to take place over the 2020s and 2030s, with large-scale adoption of hydrogen to replace remaining gas usage more likely to begin in around 2040. This followed campaigning which resulted in a prohibition on onshore gas exploration and production in Victoria in 2014. Although this was partially repealed in 2021 a constitutional ban on fracking remains in place.

To this end, in early 2024 the Victorian government announced amendments to planning regulations which essentially prohibit new gas connections for residential properties.

== Oil ==
Oil was first discovered in the Gippsland Basin under Bass Strait by Esso Australia and BHP in March 1966 in what is now the Marlin field. By early 1968, the Halibut and Kingfish oil fields were discovered nearby. Production from the fields was estimated at up to 300,000 barrels (48,000 m^{3}) per day, with recoverable reserves in the Gippsland Basin in the region of 4 billion barrels (640,000,000 m^{3}).

In 1985, oil production from the Gippsland Basin peaked to an annual average of 450,000 barrels (72,000 m^{3}) per day. However, production has gradually declined and in the 2020-2021 financial year, production had was only 25,690 barrels (4,085 m^{3}) per day.

The vast majority of Victoria's petroleum is now imported, either as crude oil or refined products. There is one oil refinery in Victoria, the Geelong Oil Refinery.

There have been a number of attempts to produce liquid fuels from Victoria's brown coal (a process known as coal liquefaction). One large-scale Japanese-funded pilot project at Morwell operated from 1987 to 1990. The project, which cost $A 1 billion (equivalent to $A 2.22 billion in 2022), was a technical success, and it was estimated that synthetic crude oil could be produced for US$30 per barrel if the plant was scaled up for commercial operation. The project did not proceed further as the production cost of the synthetic oil was uneconomic.

== Hydrogen ==
As previously mentioned, town gas (a mixture of hydrogen, carbon monoxide, and other hydrocarbon gases) was produced from black and brown coal through the 19th and 20th centuries.

Since the 2010s, there has been interest in hydrogen production for fuel, primarily for export to Asia. A pilot project, the Hydrogen Energy Supply Chain (HESC) Project, from 2019 to 2022, supported by the state and federal governments, AGL, and a number of large Japanese industrial companies including Kawasaki Heavy Industries.

Brown coal from the Latrobe Valley was successfully gasified, purified, liquified, and shipped to Japan. According to the project partners, the project represented the largest-scale shipping of hydrogen to date. The project partners propose that a commercial-scale gasification operation would use carbon capture and storage to reduce the amount of greenhouse gas emitted in the production process. No carbon capture was implemented in the pilot project.

The proposal was criticised as "greenwash", for instance by left-leaning think tank, The Australia Institute. They argue that CCS projects have a long history of failure, usually only capture a fraction of total emissions, and that the hydrogen produced by a commercial coal gasification operation in Victoria would compete against cleaner "green hydrogen" produced by electrolysis powered by renewable energy.

The project was effectively halted after the pilot, with the Japanese consortium deciding to source hydrogen locally rather than ship it from Australia to Japan. Various reasons were advanced, including lack of support from the Victorian government. Third parties suggested the high cost of shipping hydrogen was also likely a strong contributor.

== See also ==
- Energy policy of Australia
- Renewable energy in Australia
- Solar power in Australia
- Wind power in Australia
