= SEAGas pipeline =

Australian natural gas pipeline

SEA Gas pipeline
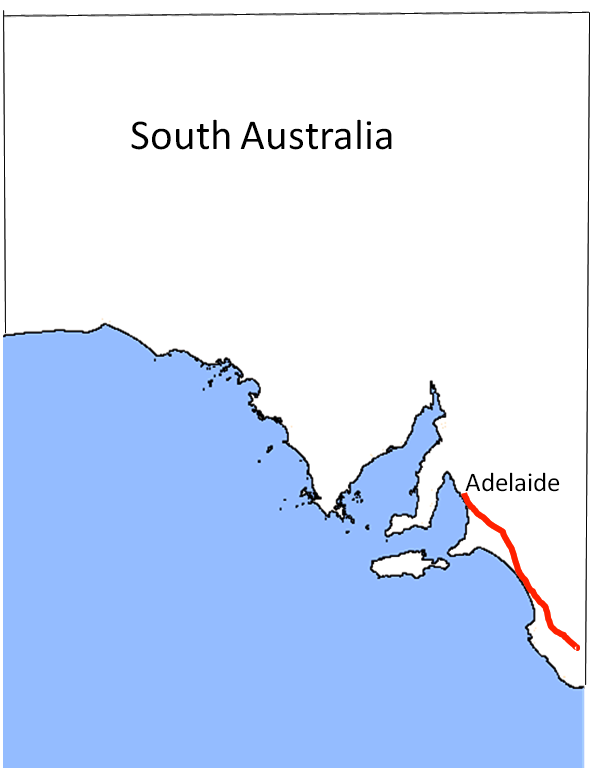
- Map of SEA Gas pipeline

Location
- Country: Australia
- State: Victoria and South Australia
- Coordinates: 34°45′47″S 138°30′18″E
- Direction: northwest
- Start: Port Campbell

General information
- Type: natural gas
- Owner: APA Group (50%); Rest Super (50%)
- Operator: APA Group
- Construction started: October 2002
- Commissioned: January 2004

Technical information
- Length: 680 km (420 mi)
- Diameter: 18 and 14 in (457 and 356 mm)
- Compressor stations: Miakite, Coomandook

The SEA Gas pipeline (South East Australia Gas pipeline) is a 687 km natural gas pipeline from the Iona Gas Plant near Port Campbell in Victoria to the Pelican Point Power Station at Port Adelaide. It connects Adelaide's gas supply to sources from Victoria's Otway Basin, thus increasing the security of natural gas supply to Adelaide. The pipeline is owned and operated by South East Australia Gas Pty Ltd, a 50-50 partnership between APA and Rest Super.

== Route and branches ==
The main pipeline is 680 kilometres (420 mi) from the Minerva gas processing plant at Port Campbell in Victoria to the Pelican Point Power Station in northwestern Adelaide. There are two compressors on the route. The Miakite compressor at Grassdale in Victoria, and the Coomandook compressor in South Australia are connected by two 14 inches (360 mm) pipes. The rest of the pipeline is a single 18 inches (460 mm) pipe. This central section has offtakes at Poolaijelo and Naracoorte. There are also offtakes to Jervois and the Cavan Meter Station. The pipeline now supplies not just the Pelican Point power station on Le Fevre Peninsula, but also both Torrens Island Power Station and Quarantine Power Station on Torrens Island east of the peninsula. At the supply end of the pipeline, there is an 18 inches (460 mm) lateral that connects Lochard Energy's Iona Gas Plant and Beach Energy's Otway Gas Plant to the main pipeline and a 14 inches (360 mm) bidirectional connection between the Minerva Gas Plant and the Victorian gas transmission network.

The offtake at Poolaijelo is the South East South Australia pipeline owned by APA. It supplies Epic Energy's South East Pipeline System at the Katnook processing plant southwest of Penola. The SEAGas gas replaces gas from the depleted Katnook Gas Field. It supplies Mount Gambier and Snuggery near Millicent as well as towns along the way and the Ladbroke Grove Power Station.

== History and construction ==
The requirement for an upgrade to South Australia's natural gas infrastructure was first identified in June 2000 when the capacity of the MAPS (Moomba Adelaide Pipeline System) was close to being fully utilised. At this time, the MAP was the sole source of natural gas for Adelaide. As about two thirds of electricity consumed in South Australia was produced by gas-fired power stations, it was determined that the state needed an additional source of supply of natural gas. An additional factor was the redundancy provided by having two independent supplies.

The need for this redundancy was dramatically confirmed when a fire at Moomba cut most of Adelaide's gas supply on the day SEA Gas began operation. The new pipeline supplied nearly all of Adelaide's gas needs at times while the damage was repaired.

The pipeline was operated by a joint venture formed in May 2001 by Pelican Point Power (a subsidiary of International Power and operator of the Pelican Point Power Station) and Origin Energy (a major Australian energy producer and retailer). In September 2003, TRUenergy (then owner and operator of the Torrens Island Power Station) joined as an equal one-third partner.

The initial proposal was to build a 14" diameter high-pressure gas pipeline, operating at 15 MPa. This was modified to dual 14" pipes for 338 km of the route and an 18" pipe for the remainder when TRUenergy joined SEA Gas as to accommodate the additional capacity required by the Torrens Island Power Station. Construction commenced in October 2002, 180 km south east of Adelaide near Tintinara. Operations commenced on 1 January 2004, however the project was not officially opened until 15 March 2004. Construction was carried out on an engineer-procure-construct (EPC) basis by a joint venture between Australian pipeline company AJ Lucas Group and French company Spie Batignolles.

== See also ==
- List of natural gas pipelines
