= South West Queensland Pipeline =

Location
- Country: Australia
- State: Queensland
- Direction: East-West
- Start: Ballera gas plant
- Passes through: Cheepie
- To: Wallumbilla supply hub

General information
- Type: Natural gas
- Owner: APA Group
- Operator: APA Group
- Commissioned: 1996

Technical information
- Length: 937 km (582 mi)
- Diameter: 450 mm (18 in)

The South West Queensland Pipeline (SWQP) is a bidirectional natural gas transmission pipeline in southern Queensland. It was built in 1996 to carry gas 755 kilometres (469 mi) from the Ballera gas plant to the gas trading hub at Wallumbilla. The western end was later extended in 2008 by 182 kilometres (113 mi) to Moomba. The original section is also known as the Ballera to Wallumbilla Pipeline System, and the extension as the Queensland/South Australia/New South Wales (QSN) Link. In 2014 the combined system was reconfigured to be bidirectional.

The pipeline has intersections with several other gas transmission pipelines along its route. At Moomba, it can deliver gas to the Moomba to Sydney Pipeline and Moomba Adelaide Pipeline System, plus bidirectional flow to/from the Moomba Gas Hub and trade At the Ballera gas plant it has bidirectional interchange with the Carpentaria Gas Pipeline. It can also deliver gas at Tarbat oilfield 26km south of Eromanga, Cheepie and Roma, Queensland en route to the Wallumbilla Hub.

== See also ==
- List of natural gas pipelines
