= Ballera gas plant =

Natural gas processing facility in south western Queensland

Ballera gas plant is a natural-gas processing facility located on the Nappa Merrie pastoral lease in Durham in the Shire of Bullo in southwestern Queensland, Australia. It is operated by Santos Limited.

The gas plant processes gas from approximately 130 wells in 45 gas fields in the Eromanga Basin. Processed gas is transmitted via the 755 km South West Queensland Pipeline to the trading hub at Wallumbilla (east of Roma) in southeastern Queensland, via the QSN Link extension of that pipeline to Moomba (180 km southwest, in northeastern South Australia) and via the Carpentaria Gas Pipeline to Mount Isa (800 km north). It is served by the Ballera Airport as workers fly in and out. Crude oil is not processed at Ballera, but at Jackson, 65 km southeast.

The Ballera gas plant is operated by Santos Limited which is slightly over 60% owner of the facility. The other joint owners are Beach Energy and Origin Energy.

The plant was established in 1991, but gas needed further processing at Moomba. It was upgraded in 1997 and 2003.

== Geography ==
=== Climate ===
Ballera experiences a subtropical desert climate (Köppen: BWh) with very hot summers, mild winters and low, yet erratic rainfall year-round. The wettest recorded day was 9 May 2016 with 96.8 mm (3.81 in) of rainfall. Extreme temperatures ranged from 47.8 °C (118.0 °F) on 2 January 2014 to −1.1 °C (30.0 °F) on 9 July 2011.

Climate data for Ballera Gas Field (27.40°S 141.81°E) (115 m (377 ft) AMSL) (1998-2025)
Month	Jan	Feb	Mar	Apr	May	Jun	Jul	Aug	Sep	Oct	Nov	Dec	Year
Record high °C (°F)	47.8 (118.0)	47.1 (116.8)	45.1 (113.2)	38.6 (101.5)	33.8 (92.8)	30.8 (87.4)	32.9 (91.2)	38.7 (101.7)	42.4 (108.3)	44.6 (112.3)	47.0 (116.6)	46.8 (116.2)	47.8 (118.0)
Mean daily maximum °C (°F)	39.8 (103.6)	37.9 (100.2)	34.9 (94.8)	30.1 (86.2)	24.4 (75.9)	20.5 (68.9)	20.5 (68.9)	23.6 (74.5)	28.1 (82.6)	32.7 (90.9)	35.5 (95.9)	38.2 (100.8)	30.5 (86.9)
Mean daily minimum °C (°F)	26.2 (79.2)	24.6 (76.3)	22.0 (71.6)	17.1 (62.8)	11.7 (53.1)	8.2 (46.8)	7.4 (45.3)	9.3 (48.7)	13.3 (55.9)	17.4 (63.3)	20.9 (69.6)	23.9 (75.0)	16.8 (62.3)
Record low °C (°F)	16.6 (61.9)	15.3 (59.5)	11.1 (52.0)	8.2 (46.8)	2.4 (36.3)	0.6 (33.1)	−1.1 (30.0)	2.4 (36.3)	5.2 (41.4)	7.1 (44.8)	9.1 (48.4)	13.5 (56.3)	−1.1 (30.0)
Average precipitation mm (inches)	26.4 (1.04)	21.4 (0.84)	37.5 (1.48)	10.3 (0.41)	10.2 (0.40)	13.0 (0.51)	7.0 (0.28)	7.9 (0.31)	13.6 (0.54)	10.4 (0.41)	22.4 (0.88)	12.5 (0.49)	192.9 (7.59)
Average precipitation days (≥ 0.2 mm)	3.8	3.0	4.1	1.4	1.9	2.9	2.5	1.6	2.8	2.2	4.2	3.4	33.8
Source: Bureau of Meteorology (1998-2025)
