= Bulldog Shale =

Formation located in South Australia

- Stratigraphic range: Aptian-Albian; ~120–110 Ma
- Type: Geological formation
- Unit of: Rolling Downs Group; Marree Subgroup
- Sub-units: Wilpoorinna Breccia Member
- Underlies: Coorikiana Sandstone
- Overlies: Cadna-owie Formation
- Thickness: 200–340 m (660–1,120 ft)

Lithology
- Primary: Mudstone, claystone
- Other: Shale, limestone, gypsum

Location
- Coordinates: 30.5°S 137.2°E
- Approximate paleocoordinates: 67.5°S 104.5°E
- Region: South Australia
- Country: Australia
- Extent: Eromanga Basin
- Bulldog Shale (Australia) Bulldog Shale (South Australia)

The Bulldog Shale is a formation of Early Cretaceous age (Aptian to Albian stages) that forms part of the Marree Subgroup of the Rolling Downs Group, located in the Eromanga Basin of South Australia, Queensland and New South Wales.

== Description ==
It is the lowermost unit in the Marree Subgroup, overlying the Cadna-owie Formation and is overlain by the Coorikiana Sandstone. The formation dates to the Aptian to Albian stages of the Early Cretaceous. The Bulldog Shale is composed of finely laminated carbonaceous and pyritic mudstone and claystone beds. Weathering has caused heavy leaching and bleaching in some regions of the Bulldog Shale, including those around Coober Pedy, so that the rocks are white or multicolored. These horizons contain rich opal deposits. Horizons without this bleaching are primarily composed of organic-rich shale. Gypsum, in addition to carbonate limestone concretions rich in fossils are common in these unbleached shaly horizons.

== Fossil content ==
The Bulldog Shale has yielded fossils of plants, invertebrates, fish, and reptiles. The macroinvertebrate fauna of this formation includes several molluscs, such belemnites, gastropods, and bivalves. Fish are represented by chimaeras and ray-finned fish (these include teleosts) and a lungfish. Sharks are conspicuously absent in the Bulldog Shale. Many plesiosaurs are known from the formation, including leptocleidids, elasmosaurids, pliosaurids, and possible polycotylids. Ichthyosaurs are also present. Archosaur fossils from the Bulldog Shale are rare, and are represented mostly indeterminate specimens, some of which can be assigned to Dinosauria. Due to the coastal location of the Bulldog Shale, large amounts of wood have also been recovered in this formation.

=== Paleobiota ===
==== Archosaurs ====
Archosaurs reported from the Bulldog Shale
Genus	Species	Location	Material	Notes	Images
Archosauria	Indet.	Andamooka, Coober Pedy	Various fragments, some opalized	Includes some material referable to Dinosauria (Theropoda)	
Kakuru	K. kujani	Andamooka	Opalized tibia	Now considered Tetanurae indet.	

==== Plesiosaurs ====
Plesiosaurs reported from the Bulldog Shale
Genus	Species	Location	Material	Notes	Images
Kronosaurus	K. queenslandicus		Teeth	Originally referred to cf. K. sp.	
Leptocleidus	L. sp.			Reclassified as Umoonasaurus	
Opallionectes	O. andamookaensis	Lunatic Hill opal field	Opalized incomplete articulated skeleton	A plesiosaur of uncertain classification	
Umoonasaurus	U. demoscyllus	Zorba Extension Opal Field, Andamooka opal fields, Curdimurka area, Neales River region	Opalized skulls and skeletons	A small leptocleidid plesiosaur with three crests on its head	
Elasmosauridae	Indet.	Andamooka	Partial skeletons and several fragments		
Polycotylidae	Indet.	Hermit Hill	Fragmentary specimen		

==== Ichthyosaurs ====
Ichthyosaurs reported from the Bulldog Shale
Genus	Species	Location	Material	Notes	Images
Platypterygius	P. sp.	Bopeechee Siding	Fragmentary cranial and postcranial material	The specimen SAM P14508 shows evidence of healed bite marks.	

==== Chondrichthyes ====
Chondrichthyans reported from the Bulldog Shale
Genus	Species	Location	Material	Notes	Images
Ptyktoptychion	P. eyrensis	Near Lake Eyre in northern South Australia			

==== Invertebrates ====
Invertebratess reported from the Bulldog Shale
Genus	Species	Location	Material	Notes	Images
Isocrinus	I. australis		Opalised calyx		
Maccoyella	M. barklyi				
Pursiphonia	P. clarkei		Opalised sponge remains		
Tropaeum	T. imperator				

Color key: Taxon / Reclassified taxon / Taxon falsely reported as present / Dubious taxon or junior synonym / Ichnotaxon / Ootaxon / Morphotaxon	Notes; Uncertain or tentative taxa are in small text; ~~crossed out~~ taxa are discredited.

== See also ==
- Fossiliferous stratigraphic units in Australia
  - Toolebuc Formation, Albian fossiliferous formation of the northern Eromanga Basin
  - Wallumbilla Formation, contemporaneous fossiliferous formation of the northern Eromanga Basin
  - Bungil Formation, Valanginian to Aptian fossiliferous formation of the Surat Basin
  - Eumeralla Formation, contemporaneous fossiliferous formation of the Otway Basin
  - Wonthaggi Formation, Valanginian to Aptian fossiliferous formation of the Gippsland Basin
- Aptian formations
  - Crato Formation, contemporaneous Lagerstätte of northeastern Brazil
  - Elrhaz Formation, contemporaneous fossiliferous formation of Niger
  - Jiufotang Formation, contemporaneous fossiliferous formation of northeastern China
  - Paja Formation, contemporaneous Lagerstätte of central Colombia
- Tookoonooka crater
