= Waarre =

Warre Victoria
- Coordinates: 38°35′S 143°3′E
- Population: 15 (2016 census)
- Postcode(s): 3269
- Location: 9 km (6 mi) northeast of Port Campbell; 220 km (137 mi) southwest of Melbourne
- LGA(s): Corangamite Shire
- State electorate(s): Polwarth
- Federal division(s): Wannon

Waarre is a locality in the Shire of Corangamite of the Australian state of Victoria. It is about nine kilometres northeast of Port Campbell.

Waarre is the site of two natural gas processing facilities. The Iona Gas Plant is owned by QIC and processes gas from the offshore Casino Gas Field. The Otway Gas Plant processes gas from the offshore Geographe and Thylacine gas fields in the Otway Basin. It was owned by Lattice Energy, a subsidiary of Origin Energy. Origin sold Lattice to Beach Energy in 2017. Forty percent of the Victorian operations were then on-sold to OG Energy in 2018. The other significant industry in the area is farming.
