= Pelican Point Power Station =

Engie power station near Adelaide, South Australia

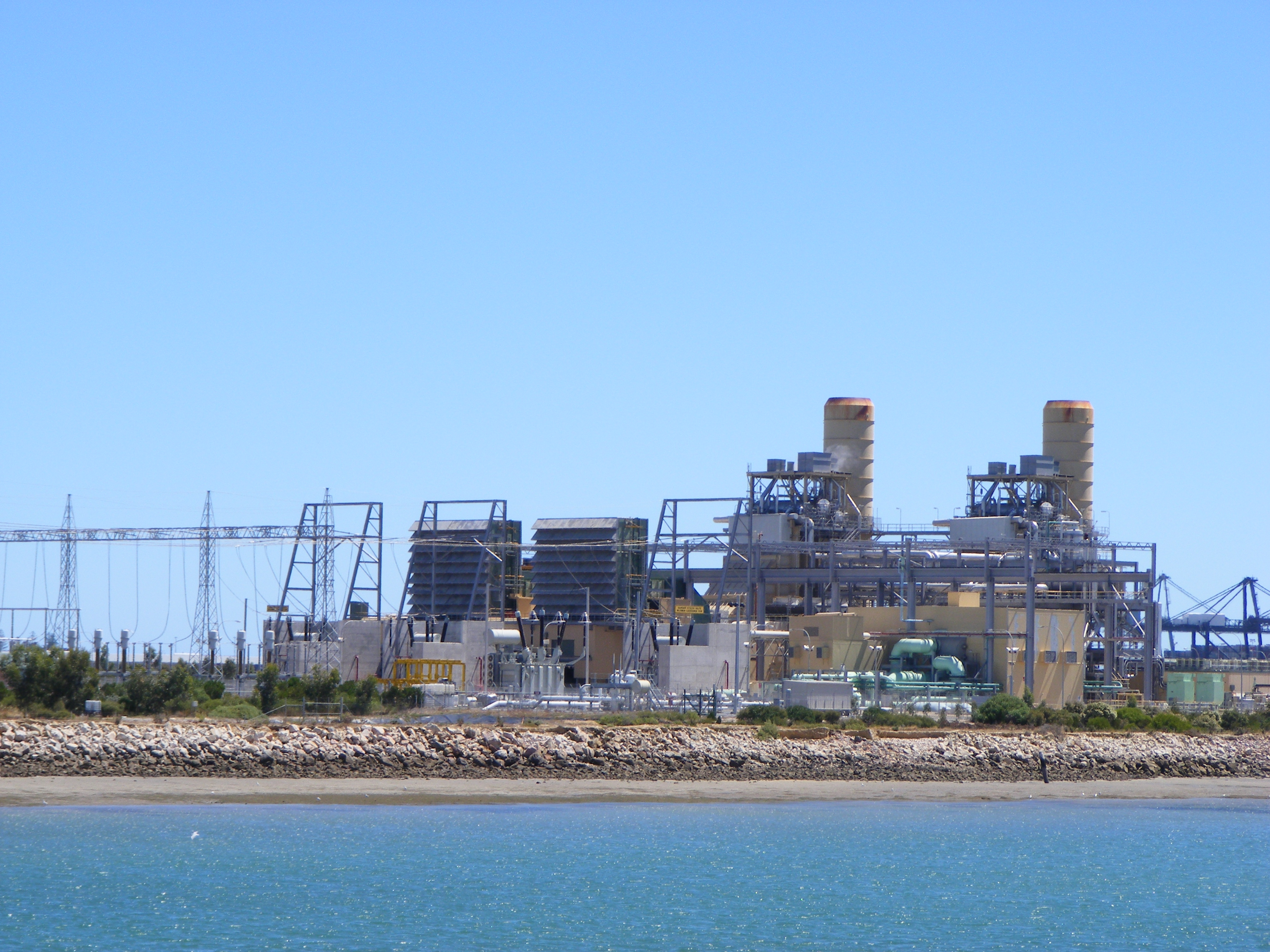
- Country: Australia
- Location: Pelican Point, South Australia
- Coordinates: 34°45′47″S 138°30′18″E
- Status: Operational
- Commission date: 2001
- Owner: Engie

Thermal power station
- Primary fuel: Natural gas
- Turbine technology: Gas turbine
- Cooling source: Sea
- Combined cycle?: Yes

Power generation
- Units operational: Two gas and one steam turbine
- Make and model: Alstom GT13E2 (2) steam turbine (1)
- Nameplate capacity: 479 MW

External links
- Website: www.gdfsuezau.com/about-us/asset/Pelican-Point-Power-Station

The Pelican Point Power Station is located at Pelican Point, 20 km from the centre of Adelaide, South Australia on the Lefevre Peninsula. It is operated by Engie (previously known as GDF Suez Australian Energy), which owns 72 per cent of the power station. Mitsui owns the remaining 28 per cent. It burns natural gas in a combined cycle power station, comprising two 160 MW gas turbines and one 165 MW steam turbine, to generate up to 485 MW of electricity.

Construction began in 1999. The plant has two GT13E2 gas turbines manufactured by ABB (now Alstom). The plant, including steam turbine and heat recovery steam generator (HRSG), was manufactured and constructed by ABB.

Fuel is supplied via either the SEAGas pipeline, which runs from the Iona Gas Plant in Victoria to the Pelican Point power station, or the Moomba Adelaide Pipeline System (MAPS), which supplies gas from Moomba to Adelaide.

== Environmental protests ==
In 1999, the proposed development of the Pelican Point Power Station led to widespread protests against its construction on environmental grounds, fearing hot water and chemical waste products from the station could harm local wildlife, in particular the dolphin and pelican populations of the Port River. These protests included a unanimous resolution by the City of Port Adelaide Enfield council to seek a legal injunction against its construction, and the formation of 'Community Action for Pelican Point' (later Community Action for Port and Peninsula), an organisation that organised protest marches both in the local area and at Parliament House, Adelaide, and a long term picket line to block the access road to the construction site. The protests and picket line led to multiple arrests, including that of the Mayor of the City of Port Adelaide Enfield, Joanna McCluskey, for failure to comply with police requests to move. Notable participants in the protests included Ms McCluskey, local Kaurna representatives, as well as state and federal Australian Labor Party, Greens, Australian Democrats, and Independent MPs including Nick Xenaphon.

== Community engagement ==
Since 2002 International Power have allowed school and community groups to tour Pelican Point Power Station. The tours were originally designed and run by The Investigator Science and Technology Centre, and were taken over by SciWorld when the Investigator closed in 2006. Since January 2009 the tours have been operated by Mobile Science Education.

== Reduced operation ==
Since March 2013 the power station has generally operated at half capacity due to over-capacity in the South Australian region of the National Electricity Market. Grid generation capacity was reduced in early 2016 when the Northern Power Station closed. Generation at Pelican Point was increased to full capacity at the request of the South Australian government for at least a week in July 2016, due to much of the state's wind generation being offline due to damaging high winds, and the Heywood interconnector being unavailable due to works associated with a planned increase in its capacity. It returned to only operating one unit (half capacity) and the owner claimed that the National Electricity Market rules prohibited the second unit from responding to a request for electricity market responses on 8 February 2017. The result was that the extremely hot weather in Adelaide plus little wind to drive wind turbines led to the market operator requiring "load shedding" for 27 minutes during the evening electricity demand peak. The owner later clarified that it is not allowed to bid into the market if supply cannot be guaranteed, and it did not have a current gas supply contract for the second unit. It was able to respond promptly once directed to do so on 9 February during continuing high temperature weather.

Engie advised AEMO on 5 June 2017 that they were currently operating at half capacity (239 MW), but would make full capacity available to the market (479 MW) as of 1 July 2017.

A 200 megawatt (MW), 400 megawatt hour (MWh) grid battery started construction in 2025, expected operational by 2027.

== See also ==
- International Power
- List of power stations in South Australia
