= Marree Subgroup =

Geological subgroup in South Australia

- Stratigraphic range: Aptian-Albian
- Type: Subgroup
- Unit of: Rolling Downs Group
- Sub-units: Bellinger Sandstone, Bulldog Shale, Coorikiana Sandstone, Oodnadatta Formation
- Underlies: Mackunda & Winton Formations
- Overlies: Parabarana Sandstone, Cadna-owie Formation

Lithology
- Primary: Siltstone
- Other: Gravel, conglomerate, shale, clay

Location
- Coordinates: 30°26′0″S 137°10′0″E
- Approximate paleocoordinates: 57.1°S 117.3°E
- Region: South Australia
- Country: Australia
- Extent: Eromanga Basin

Type section
- Named for: Marree
- Named by: Forbes
- Year defined: 1966
- Marree Subgroup (Australia)

The Marree Subgroup, previously described as Maree Formation and Marree Formation, is a geological subgroup in the Eromanga Basin of South Australia whose strata date back to the Aptian. The subgroup was first described as a formation by Forbes in 1966. Dinosaur remains are among the fossils that have been recovered from the formation.

An opalised plesiosaur specimen of the genus Umoonasaurus has been nicknamed 'Eric' and was described in 1998 by Schroeder. The decapod crab Dioratiopus salebrosus was described in 1980.

== Vertebrate paleofauna ==
Indeterminate theropod remains present in Western Australia.

Dinosaurs

Dinosaurs of the Marree Subgroup
Genus	Species	Presence	Notes	Images
Kakuru	K. kujani	Geographically present in Western Australia, Australia.	"Hindlimb."	

Sauropterygians

Sauropterygians of the Marree Subgroup
Genus	Species	Presence	Notes	Images
Umoonasaurus	U. demoscyllus	Bulldog Shale of northern South Australia.	Known from an opalized skeleton nicknamed 'Eric'.	

== See also ==
- List of dinosaur-bearing rock formations
