= Riverland Pipeline =

Location
- Country: Australia
- State: South Australia
- Direction: West–east
- Start: Angaston
- Passes through: Sedan
- To: Berri

General information
- Type: natural gas
- Owner: Australian Gas Networks
- Operator: APA Group
- Construction started: 1994
- Commissioned: 1995

Technical information
- Length: 237 km (147 mi)
- Diameter: 114.3 mm (5 in)

The Riverland Pipeline System is a natural gas transmission pipeline supplying gas to the Riverland region of South Australia. It is owned by Australian Gas Networks (formerly Envestra) and operated by the APA Group. The pipeline was built in 1995 by South Australian Gas Company and transferred to Envestra when it was privatised in 1997. The pipeline is a buried steel pipeline with nominal outside diameter of 114.3 millimetres (4.50 in) with 3.0 millimetres (0.12 in) wall thickness. The maximum allowable operating pressure is 10,000 kilopascals (1,500 psi). Most of the pipe is buried to a depth of 600–900 millimetres (24–35 in) but it is deeper and has thicker walls in areas of high risk such as under road crossings.

The Riverland Pipeline is supplied by gas from the Angaston lateral on the Moomba Adelaide Pipeline System (MAPS). The main pipeline runs from Angaston to Berri in the Riverland with a lateral supply line branching near Sedan to Murray Bridge. Gas can also be delivered to Mildura vie the Mildura Pipeline connection at Berri.

The Riverland Pipeline is governed by the National Gas Law.
