= Leichhardt Power Station =

- Country: Australia
- Location: Mount Isa
- Coordinates: 20°46′59″S 139°29′13″E
- Status: Operational
- Commission date: 2014
- Owner: APA Group

Thermal power station
- Primary fuel: Natural gas
- Secondary fuel: Diesel fuel
- Turbine technology: Gas turbine

Power generation
- Make and model: Rolls-Royce Rolls-Royce Trent (1)
- Nameplate capacity: 60 MW

Leichhardt Power Station is a 60 MW open cycle gas turbine power station near Mount Isa in the Australian state of Queensland. The gas-fired power station was completed in 2014 and is capable of operating on diesel if gas is not available. It contains a single Rolls-Royce Trent 60 gas turbine. It is adjacent to the larger combined cycle Diamantina Power Station for which it provides backup. The power station was built under an engineering, procurement and construction contract by WSP Global. Mount Isa is not on the National Electricity Market, but does have piped natural gas from production in southern Queensland supplied via the Carpentaria Gas Pipeline. Both Diamantina and Leichhardt power stations are owned by APA Group. APA Group bought out its 50% equity partner AGL Energy on 31 March 2016 for A$151 million. It retained the long-term gas supply contract with AGL.
