= Tookoonooka impact structure =

Meteorite impact structure in Australia

- Location within Queensland
- Location: Eromanga Basin, South West, Queensland, Australia; 27°7′S 142°50′E

Impact crater structure
- Confidence: Confirmed
- Diameter: 55–66 km (34–41 mi)
- Age: 128 ± 5 Ma; Early Cretaceous
- Exposed: No
- Drilled: Yes

Tookoonooka is a large meteorite impact structure (astrobleme) situated in South West Queensland, Australia. It lies deeply buried within Mesozoic sedimentary rocks of the Eromanga Basin and is not visible at the surface.

== Description ==
Tookoonooka was discovered using seismic data collected during routine petroleum exploration and first reported in a publication in 1989, with proof of the impact theory coming from the discovery of shocked quartz in drill core. Estimates of the crater diameter range from 55 km (34 mi) to 66 km (41 mi). The impact occurred during deposition of the Cretaceous Cadna-owie Formation, the age of which is variously estimated at being between 123 and 133 Ma, or 115–112 Ma. Tookoonooka is associated with several small oil fields.

== Talundilly impact structure ==
The seismic data reveal a similar nearby structure of the same age referred to as Talundilly. Although it seems likely that Tookoonooka and Talundilly are paired impact structures, proof that the latter is of impact origin is not possible without drilling. Another proposed paired impact structures are the larger West and East Warburton Basin structures in the nearby state of South Australia.

== See also ==
- Cooper Basin
- East Warburton Basin
