= Leslie Gooden =

Australian cricketer

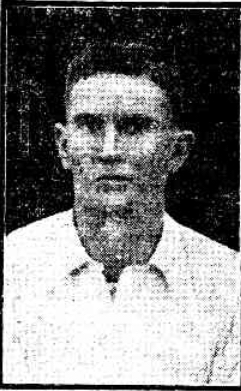

Personal information
- Full name: Norman Leslie Gooden
- Born: 27 December 1889; Norwood, South Australia
- Died: 5 July 1966 (aged 76); Unley Park, South Australia
- Batting: Right-handed
- Role: Batsman

Domestic team information
- Years: Team
- 1912/13–1913/14: South Australia

Career statistics
Competition	First-class
Matches	2
Runs scored	196
Batting average	65.33
100s/50s	1/0
Top score	102
Catches/stumpings	1/–
- Source: Cricinfo, 8 June 2021

Norman Leslie Gooden (27 December 1889 – 5 July 1966) was an Australian cricketer and missionary. He played in two first-class matches for South Australia between 1912 and 1914.

== Early life ==
The son of Henry Alfred Gooden and Kate Askew Gooden (nee Whitridge), Gooden was one of eleven children.

He attended the Grote Street Church of Christ where he captained the Australian rules football side and led the Bible class.

== Cricket career ==
Playing for West Torrens Cricket Club against Glenelg Cricket Club at Hindmarsh Oval in November 1911, Gooden scored 162. Early in the innings, Gooden hooked a ball out of the ground and onto the roof of a passing tram on the way to the city. Later, he played a similar shot that landed on the same tram on its return trip to the Hindmarsh terminus.

Gooden made his debut for South Australia on 25 October 1912, against Western Australia at the Adelaide Oval, where, batting at number three, he scored 49 and 102. He reached his century in 145 minutes, and he and Algy Gehrs added 174 for the third wicket in an hour.

In spite of scoring a century in his maiden first-class match, Gooden did not represent South Australia again until 16 January 1914, against the touring New Zealanders at the Adelaide Oval, scoring nine and 36 not out.

Gooden did not play another first-class match, ending his career with a batting average of 65.33. He did play one match for South Australian Colts, against Victorian Colts, in Melbourne from 13 February 1914, scoring nine and 130.

== Missionary life ==
Outside of cricket, Gooden worked for the South Australian Gas Company for many years while heavily involved with the Hindmarsh Baptist Church and the YMCA. He was treasurer of the South Australian YMCA Army Depot during the First World War. He "always had a leaning towards foreign mission work", and joined the evangelical Poona and Indian Village Mission (of which his uncle Henry Gooden was the long-serving Adelaide secretary) and in 1920 moved to Nasrapur, India, to work and preach in small villages in the Bombay Presidency.

Gooden eventually rose to the position of Chairman of the Board of Control of the Poona and Indian Village Mission before relocating to London in 1933 to act as Secretary of the Ceylon and India Mission.

Gooden met and married Elise Violet Moores in India.

Part of a well-known extended cricketing family, Gooden's uncles Henry and James Gooden represented South Australia uncle George Gooden, was the first curator of the Adelaide Oval and his brother Sydney played for West Torrens Cricket Club.

== Sources ==
- Beach, H.P. (ed.) (1925) World Missionary Atlas, Edinburgh House Press: London.
- Page, R. (1984) South Australian Cricketers 1877–1984, Association of Cricket Statisticians and Historians: Retford, Nottinghamshire.
- Piesse, K. & Davis, C. (2012) Encyclopedia of Australian Cricket Players, New Holland Publishers: Sydney. ISBN 9781742572802.
- Sando, G. (1997) Grass Roots: 100 Years of Adelaide District Cricket 1897-1997, South Australian Cricket Association: North Adelaide. ISBN 1862544352.
- Taylor, H.R. (1960) The History of Churches of Christ in South Australia 1846-1959, The Churches of Christ Evangelistic Union Incorporated South Australia: Adelaide.
