= James Gooden =

Australian cricketer (1845–1913)

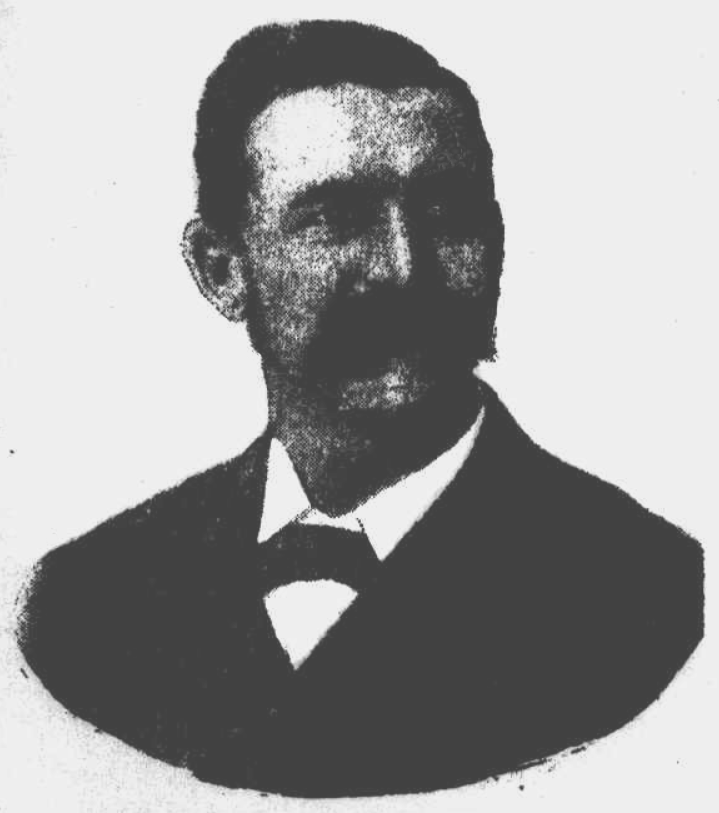

Personal information
- Full name: James Edward Gooden
- Born: 23 December 1845; Brentford, England
- Died: 17 July 1913 (aged 67); Norwood, South Australia
- Batting: Right handed
- Role: Batsman

Domestic team information
- Years: Team
- 1872/73-1892/93: South Australia

Career statistics
Competition	First-class
Matches	10
Runs scored	175
Batting average	10.93
100s/50s	-/-
Top score	39
Catches/stumpings	5/–
- Source: Cricinfo, 6 July 2021

James Edward Gooden (23 December 1845 – 17 July 1913) was an Australian cricketer. He played in ten first-class matches for South Australia between 1872 and 1893.

Born in Brentford, England in 1845, Gooden emigrated with his parents to Adelaide in 1848, where his father became one of the first basket makers in the colony.

== Club cricket ==
Called "a good batsman and field", Gooden made his senior Adelaide club debut in 1861 with the Eastern Suburban club before moving to Norwood Cricket Club, scoring 3427 runs at 23.63 for Norwood until his retirement in 1896. He was a Norwood delegate to the first ever South Australian Cricket Association (SACA) Committee of Management meeting on 5 July 1871 and played in the first ever match organised by SACA. Chosen in the "British born" team against the "Colonial born" team, the match commenced on 11 November 1872 at the Saint Peter's College Ground (the Adelaide Oval was not yet ready for matches).

Gooden was heavily involved in coaching young cricketers. Australian Test cricketer George Giffen would later claim that Gooden's coaching and encouragement was an important factor in his success.

Gooden did not score a district century until aged 45 when he scored two in succession, including 147 in a match against North Adelaide, when he and George Giffen put on 365 for the fourth wicket. Playing for Norwood, Gooden won a record 16 premierships in the Adelaide district competition and was Norwood's long serving captain until controversially ousted by George Giffen in a change room coup.

== First-class career ==
Gooden was one of three South Australians chosen in a combined colonies team (players from New South Wales, South Australia and Tasmania) to play Victoria at the Melbourne Cricket Ground, starting Boxing Day 1872. This was subsequently recognised as a first-class match, meaning that Gooden was one of the first South Australians to play first-class cricket, as it would be five years before South Australia played their initial first-class match. Gooden scored three in his only innings.

Gooden captained South Australia on six occasions and played into his forties, with his highest first-class score 39 against New South Wales in 1890/91. His final first-class match, against Western Australia was at Adelaide Oval on 27–28 March 1893. Captaining South Australia and scoring four in his only innings, Gooden, at age 47 years and 95 days, remains the second oldest South Australian cricketer (behind Clarrie Grimmett, who was 49 years and 62 days in his final match).

Gooden had less success as a bowler, being called for throwing while playing for a SACA XI against Northern Yorke Peninsula in 1877/78.

== Personal life ==
Outside of cricket, Gooden had a varied career, working at various times as a real estate agent, for the South Australian Gas Company, and, with his brother Charles, licensee of the Napoleon Hotel on King William Street, Adelaide. He was also a crack rifle shot, captaining South Australia in interstate shooting championships. Gooden was a member of the Norwood Voluntary Fire Brigade, a long-time Secretary of the Norwood Working Man's Club and a Master of the Emulation Lodge of Freemasons.

Gooden's obituary in Cricket magazine stated that "he fell upon evil days during the latter part of his life", suffering a nervous breakdown and heart trouble and was reduced to living in "a dreadfully run-down boarding house. He was the recipient of a large testimonial raised by old cricketers shortly before his death. Gooden died on 17 July 1913, leaving a widow, two sons and two daughters.

Gooden's brother Henry Gooden and nephew Leslie Gooden also played cricket for South Australia, while another brother, George Gooden, was the first curator of the Adelaide Oval and Town Clerk of Kensington and Norwood.

== See also ==
- List of South Australian representative cricketers

== Sources ==
- Harte, C. (1990) The History of the South Australian Cricket Association, South Australian Cricket Association: Adelaide. ISBN 09587980 3 6.
- Page, R. (1984) South Australian Cricketers 1877–1984, Association of Cricket Statisticians and Historians: Retford, Nottinghamshire.
- Sando, G. (1997) Grass Roots: 100 years of Adelaide District Cricket 1897-1997, SACA: Adelaide. ISBN 9781862544352.
