= United Energy =

Energy network in Victoria, Australia

United Energy is a Victorian energy network that distributes electricity across east and south-east Melbourne and the Mornington Peninsula to more than 640,000 customers, 90% of which are residential. Its network includes 209,000 poles and over 13,000 kilometres of wires. Electricity is received via 78 sub-transmission lines at 46 zone stations, where it is transformed from sub-transmission voltages to distribution voltages.

The company was owned by the DUET Group, which also owned Multinet Gas, which distributes gas in Melbourne's inner eastern suburbs to middle-eastern Victoria. DUET also owned the Western Australian Dampier to Bunbury Natural Gas Pipeline, the sole gas conduit for Perth and coastal Western Australia.

In April 2017, Hong Kong–based Cheung Kong Infrastructure (CKI) proposed to acquire the DUET Group for A$7.4 billion, which was approved by FIRB later that month. CKI also owns CitiPower in Melbourne, Powercor in western Melbourne and western Victoria, and Envestra, which distributes gas through much of Victoria, as well as Queensland and South Australia. After the acquisition, CKI owns three out of five electricity distributors and two out of three gas distributors in Victoria.
