= Henry Gooden =

Australian cricketer

Personal information
- Full name: Henry Alfred Gooden
- Born: 12 January 1858; Adelaide, Australia
- Died: 30 March 1904 (aged 46); Fitzroy, Victoria
- Batting: Right handed
- Role: Batsman

Domestic team information
- Years: Team
- 1877/78-1880/81: South Australia

Career statistics
Competition	First-class
Matches	3
Runs scored	66
Batting average	16.50
100s/50s	0/0
Top score	49
Balls bowled	44
Wickets	0
Bowling average	-
5 wickets in innings	0
10 wickets in match	0
Best bowling	4/65
Catches/stumpings	-/–
- Source: Cricinfo, 6 July 2021

Henry Alfred Gooden (12 January 1858 – 30 March 1904) was an Australian cricketer. He played in three first-class matches for South Australia between 1877 and 1881.

Playing for Norwood Cricket Club in Adelaide.

Outside of cricket, Gooden worked for the South Australian Audit Department before transferring to Melbourne in 1902 to work for the new Federal Audit Office. He was also heavily involved in religious work, spending 27 years volunteering with the Baptist Church in Adelaide, including serving as the Adelaide Secretary of the Poona and Indian Village Mission.

Gooden died in Melbourne on 30 March 1904, leaving "a widow and a large family".

Gooden's brother James Gooden and nephew Leslie Gooden also played cricket for South Australia, while another brother, George Gooden, was the first curator of the Adelaide Oval and Town Clerk of Kensington and Norwood.

== See also ==
- List of South Australian representative cricketers

== Sources ==
- Page, R. (1984) South Australian Cricketers 1877–1984, Association of Cricket Statisticians and Historians: Retford, Nottinghamshire.
