= CK Infrastructure Holdings =

Hong Kong infrastructure company

CK Infrastructure Holdings Limited
- Native name: 長江基建集團有限公司
- Company type: Public
- Traded as: SEHK: 1038 LSE: CKI
- Industry: Infrastructure
- Founded: 1996; 30 years ago
- Headquarters: Hong Kong
- Area served: Hong Kong
- Key people: Victor Li (chairman)
- Owner: CK Hutchison Holdings (75.67%)
- Website: www.cki.com.hk

CK Infrastructure Holdings Limited (CKI) is the largest publicly listed infrastructure company in Hong Kong with diversified investments in energy infrastructure, transportation Infrastructure, water Infrastructure and infrastructure related business, parented by CK Hutchison Holdings, businessman Li Ka Shing's flagship company. It is a leading player in the global infrastructure arena in Hong Kong, Mainland China, Australia, New Zealand, the United Kingdom, Continental Europe and North America. The chairman is Victor Li, the elder son of Li Ka Shing.

CKI is currently a Hang Seng Index Constituent Stock (bluechip).

On 30 July 2010, CK Infrastructure, the former Hongkong Electric Holdings (subsequently renamed Power Assets Holdings Limited in February 2011) and the Li Ka Shing Foundation announced the acquisition of three UK electricity networks business from Électricité de France.

On 20 January 2015, CK Infrastructure Holdings announced the acquisition of British company Eversholt Rail Group for £2.5 billion (US$3.79 billion).

In September 2018, Australia Antitrust Regulator cleared CK Infrastructure to acquire APA Group of Australia for $9 billion.

In July 2024, CK Infrastructure Holdings announced it was considering a secondary listing on the London Stock Exchange. It listed on the LSE on 19 August 2024.

== Assets ==
The following list is some of the companies that CK Infrastructure and its subsidiary Power Assets Holdings hold at least a 50% share in:

- United Kingdom
  - Eversholt Rail Group
  - Northern Gas Networks Limited
  - Northumbrian Water Group
  - Seabank Power Station
  - Southern Water
  - Wales & West Utilities
  - UK Power Networks
- Australia
  - Australian Gas Networks
  - Citipower
  - Dampier Bunbury Pipeline
  - Powercor
  - Multinet Gas
  - SA Power Networks
  - United Energy
- New Zealand
  - Wellington Electricity
  - Enviro NZ
- Continental Europe
  - ista SE
  - Dutch Enviro Energy (AVR)
- Hong Kong and Mainland China
  - Shantou Bay Bridge
  - Green Island Cement

== Chairmen ==
1. Victor Li (1996– )
