= Terranora interconnector =

Directlink (Terranora) Interconnector
- Location of Directlink (Terranora) Interconnector

Location
- Country: Australia
- State: New South Wales
- General direction: south-north
- From: Mullumbimby
- To: Bungalora

Ownership information
- Owner: Energy Infrastructure Investments (EII)
- Operator: APA Group

Construction information
- Cable manufacturer: ABB
- Substation manufacturer: ABB
- Contractors: TransÉnergie Australia
- Commissioned: 2000

Technical information
- Type: Land cable (buried)
- Current type: HVDC VSC
- Total length: 63 km (39 mi)
- Capacity: 180 MW
- AC voltage: 110 kV (Bungalora), 132 kV (Mullumbimby)
- DC voltage: ±80 kV
- No. of circuits: 3

Directlink (Terranora) Interconnector is a mixed buried and above ground 59 kilometre (37 mi) High Voltage Direct Current (HVDC) electricity transmission cable route from near Lavertys Gap (28°34′15″S 153°27′8″E), 5 kilometres (3.1 mi) Southwest of Mullumbimby, New South Wales and Bungalora (28°15′20″S 153°28′20″E) & connected via a 3.5 km (2.2 mi) AC Overhead Transmission Line to the NorthEast to the Terranora Electrical Substation (28°14′28.3″S 153°30′12.7″E) @ Terranora, New South Wales in Eastern Australia. The DC cables alternate between above ground in a galvanised steel trough and below ground with depths up to 1 metre.

It is one of the two interconnections used to trade electricity between New South Wales and Queensland (the other is the 330 kV Dual Circuit Queensland – New South Wales Interconnector (QNI)).

== History ==
The interconnector was developed by a joint venture of NorthPower (later Country Energy), TransÉnergie–a subsidiary of Hydro-Québec, and Fonds de solidarité FTQ. The motivation to build the interconnector was the power shortage in Southern Queensland and surplus capacities in New South Wales. It was developed as an Independent Transmission Project. It was commissioned in December 1999 and it started operations in April 2000. It was the first time that transmission systems of New South Wales and Queensland were linked. The construction cost US$70 million.

In December 2006, it was announced that Directlink would be purchased by Australian Pipeline Trust (APT, a part of APA Group) for US$133 million. The transaction was completed in February 2007.

Originally, the interconnector operated as a non-regulated market network service. However, on 6 May 2004 an application to convert it to a regulated network service was submitted. The application was approved by the Australian Energy Regulator on 10 March 2006.

In December 2008, ownership of Directlink (as well as Murraylink) was transferred to the Energy Infrastructure Investments Group, while the APA Group continued as the operator. The ownership of EII is allocated as APA with 19.9%, Japan-based Marubeni Corporation with 49.9%, and Osaka Gas with 30.2%.

== Technical description ==
Directlink (Terranora) interconnector is a 59-kilometre (37 mi) HVDC land cable route. The system has three 65 MVA Voltage Source Converters at each station connected by three pairs of transmission cables. Each pair of cables operates at +/-80 kV and transmits 60 MW. In New South Wales it is connected to a 132 kV alternating current transmission grid and in Queensland to 110 kV alternating current transmission grid.

The total rating of the interconnector is 180 MW. The maximum net transfer minus losses is around 170 MW. If one pair of cables malfunctions, the available capacity is around 115 MW. If two pairs of cables are out of service, the capacity is around 57 MW. However, in some cases for a limited time period the interconnector has operated in an overloading mode for up to 250 MW. The limiting factor for flow in the New South Wales direction is the thermal ratings of the Terranora–Mudgeeraba 110 kV lines and Mullumbimby–Dunoon 132 kV lines, and for flow in the Queensland direction is the thermal ratings of the Lismore–Dunoon 132 kV lines.

HVDC VSC was chosen for this project for reasons of low environmental impact of the transmission route and the ability of the IGBT converter stations at each end to accurately control both real and reactive power. Individual water-cooled IGBT modules are rated at 2.5 kV and 500 A, with multiple units connected in series to achieve the required voltage rating.
