= Moomba to Sydney Pipeline =

Moomba to Sydney

Location
- Country: Australia
- Direction: north-west/south-east
- Start: Moomba, South Australia
- Passes through: Queensland
- To: Sydney

General information
- Type: natural gas, ethane
- Owner: APA Group
- Operator: APA Group
- Commissioned: 1976

Technical information
- Length: 2,081 km (1,293 mi)

The Moomba to Sydney Pipeline is two parallel pipelines sharing for most of the route the same 40' wide easement from Moomba, South Australia to Sydney. The pipeline, owned by APA Group, is over 2,000 km long. The pipeline is part of an East Coast gas grid network which covers various southern energy markets in Australia.

The Moomba to Sydney Natural Gas Pipeline carries natural gas.

The Moomba to Sydney Ethane Pipeline carries ethane.
