= Ballera Airport =

Airport in Queensland, Australia

- IATA: BBL; ICAO: YLLE

Summary
- Airport type: Private
- Operator: Santos Limited
- Serves: Ballera gas plant, Queensland, Australia
- Elevation AMSL: 385 ft / 117 m
- Coordinates: 27°24′30″S 141°48′30″E

Map
- Location in Queensland

Runways
Direction	Length		Surface
Direction	m	ft	Surface
03/21	1,800	5,906	Asphalt
- Sources: Australian AIP and aerodrome chart

Ballera Airport (IATA: BBL, ICAO: YLLE) is located at the Ballera gas plant in the locality of Durham in southwestern Queensland, Australia. There is one runway, and it is 5,906 ft × 98 ft (1,800 m × 30 m) long × wide.

== Airlines and destinations ==
Airlines	Destinations
Alliance Airlines	Mining Charter: Brisbane, Moomba

== See also ==
- List of airports in Queensland
