= Emu Downs Solar Farm =

Solar farm next to Emu Downs Wind Farm

- Country: Australia
- Location: Adjacent to Emu Downs Wind Farm
- Coordinates: 30°29′S 115°25′E
- Status: Operational
- Commission date: December 2017
- Construction cost: A$50 million
- Owner: APA Group

Solar farm
- Type: Flat-panel PV
- Collectors: 75,168
- Site area: 70 hectares (170 acres)

Power generation
- Nameplate capacity: 20 MW

Emu Downs Solar Farm is a solar farm adjacent to Emu Downs Wind Farm in Western Australia, Australia. It was developed and is owned by APA Group. At the time of its completion in 2018, it was the largest solar farm in Western Australia.

When APA group bought Emu Downs Wind Farm in June 2011, it realised that there is usually a drop in output in the middle of the day as the wind changes from easterly in the morning to the westerly Fremantle Doctor in the afternoon. To balance that and achieve better utilisation of transmission infrastructure, APA installed a 20MW solar farm on an adjacent site. The solar farm's peak output is during the time when the wind farm is not at full capacity, so no additional capacity was needed in the substation or grid connection point. The solar farm has 75,000 photovoltaic solar panels on a 70-hectare site east of the wind farm. It cost A$50 million (including a federal government grant of A$5.5 million) and began operation in December 2017. The output of both the solar and wind farms is contracted to Synergy until 2030.
