= Murraylink =

HVDC underground power line in Australia

- Map of Murraylink

Location
- Country: Australia
- Coordinates: 34°17′37″S 142°14′20″E; 34°14′17″S 140°36′01″E
- From: Berri, South Australia
- To: Red Cliffs, Victoria

Ownership information
- Owner: Energy Infrastructure Investment
- Operator: APA Group

Construction information
- Cable manufacturer: ABB
- Commissioned: 2002

Technical information
- Type: underground cable
- Current type: Light HVDC
- Total length: 180 km (110 mi)
- Capacity: 220 MW
- AC voltage: 132 kV (Berri); 220 kV (Red Cliffs)
- DC voltage: ±150 kV
- No. of poles: 2

Murraylink is an Australian high voltage direct current electricity transmission link between Berri, South Australia and Red Cliffs, Victoria, connecting the two state electricity grids. Murraylink was commissioned in 2002 and is believed to be the world's longest underground transmission system and cost more than A$177 million. It was built by TransEnergie Australia, a subsidiary of Hydro-Québec. It was sold to the APA Group in March 2006 for A$153 million. In December 2008 ownership of Murraylink (as well as Directlink) was transferred to the newly formed Energy Infrastructure Investments Group, while APA continued as the operator. The ownership of EII is APA with 19.9%, with the balance with Marubeni (49.9%) and Osaka Gas (30.2%).

== Capacity ==
Murraylink consists of two 176-kilometre (109 mi) long bipolar HVDC cables. The circuit has an operating voltage of 150 kV and a transmission capacity of 220 megawatts. The link operates an "HVDC Light" voltage-source converter system, utilising insulated-gate bipolar transistors (IGBT), to convert electricity between alternating current and direct current.

While Murraylink is rated at 220MW, it is unable to operate at capacity during periods of high demand due to limitations in the transmission infrastructure at either end. The limitations relate to thermal overload of transformers or transmission lines supplying the Riverland (for South Australia to Victoria transmission) and western Victoria (for Victoria to South Australia transmission).

== Sites ==
Site	Coordinates
Red Cliffs Static Inverter Plant	34°17′37″S 142°14′20″E
Berri Static Inverter Plant	34°14′17″S 140°36′01″E
