= Badgingarra Wind Farm =

Wind farm in Western Australia

- Country: Australia
- Location: Hill River, WA
- Coordinates: 30°24′36″S 115°19′12″E
- Status: Operational
- Construction began: November 2017
- Commission date: 2 May 2019
- Construction cost: A$315m
- Owner: APA Group

Thermal power station
- Primary fuel: Wind energy

Wind farm
- Type: Onshore

Power generation
- Units operational: 37 × 3.6 MW
- Make and model: Siemens SWT-3.6-130
- Nameplate capacity: 133.2 MW
- Capacity factor: 44.1 %
- Annual net output: 514.5 GWh (2020)

External links
- Website: www.apa.com.au/our-services/other-energy-services/wind--solar-farms/badgingarra-wind-farm/

Badgingarra Wind Farm is a wind farm in the locality of Hill River northwest of the town of Badgingarra in Western Australia, about 200 kilometres (120 mi) north of Perth. It is owned by APA Group and located immediately north of the older Emu Downs Wind Farm which has the same owner.

Construction of Badgingarra Wind Farm began in November 2017 and it was completed in early 2019. It consists of 37 Siemens wind turbine generators, each generating 3.6 MW of electricity. The turbine hubs are 85 metres (279 ft) above the ground, and the rotor tips reach 150 metres (490 ft). APA Group is also constructing the Badgingarra Solar Farm adjacent to the wind farm to provide 17.5 MW of solar photovoltaic generation.

Badgingarra Wind Farm was officially opened by the Western Australian Energy Minister, Bill Johnston on 2 May 2019. It is connected to the Western Power network North Country region. The output is contracted to Alinta Energy until the end of 2035. The wind farm is expected to generate 500–550 GWh of energy per annum.

== Operations ==
AEMO records begin in January 2019 for the wind farm. The generation table uses AEMO Facility SCADA to obtain generation values for each month.

Badgingarra Wind Farm Generation (MWh)
Year	Total	Jan	Feb	Mar	Apr	May	Jun	Jul	Aug	Sep	Oct	Nov	Dec
2019	524,712	26,924	36,866	39,664	42,255	47,462	40,178	33,664	44,667	38,845	50,863	65,834	57,490
2020	504,247	48,033	40,042	46,298	33,568	40,476	36,935	41,461	45,954	36,512	45,639	37,050	52,279

Note: Asterisk indicates power output was limited during the month.

The wind farm has occasionally achieved a monthly capacity factor of 48%.
