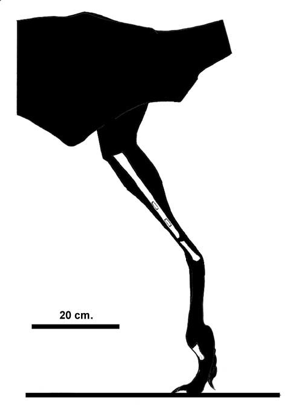
- Skeletal diagram showing known bones

Scientific classification
- Kingdom: Animalia
- Phylum: Chordata
- Class: Reptilia
- Clade: Dinosauria
- Clade: Saurischia
- Clade: Theropoda
- Clade: Maniraptora
- Genus: †Kakuru; Molnar & Pledge, 1980

Type species
- †Kakuru kujani Molnar & Pledge, 1980

= Kakuru =

Kakuru Temporal range: Aptian ~120–113 Ma

Extinct genus of theropod dinosaurs

Kakuru is a dubious genus of theropod dinosaur from the Early Cretaceous of Australia.

== Discovery ==
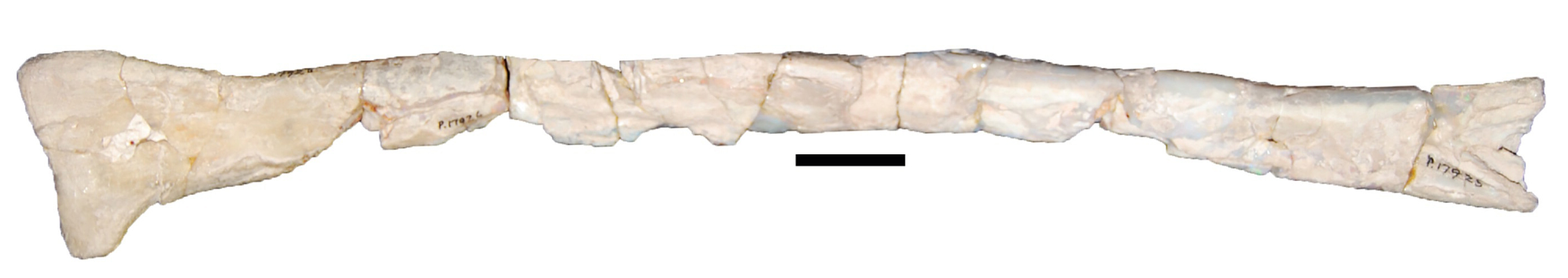
Left tibia

The only described species, Kakuru kujani, is known primarily from evidence of a single tibia, which had been fossilised through a rare process in which the bone through hydration turned to opal. The bone was dug up at the opal fields of Andamooka, South Australia. The opalised tibia was exhibited by a gem shop in 1973 and by chance brought to the attention of paleontologist Neville Pledge. The owner at the time, a certain A. Fleming, allowed pictures and two casts to be made but eventually the specimen was sold at an auction to an anonymous buyer. It was presumed lost to science. In 2004, however, the South Australian Museum succeeded in procuring the fossil for $22,000.

Kakuru was formally named in 1980 by Pledge and Ralph Molnar. The type species is Kakuru kujani. The generic name is the name of the Rainbow Serpent of Australian Aboriginal mythology in the Kuyani language, and the specific name honors the Kuyani themselves.

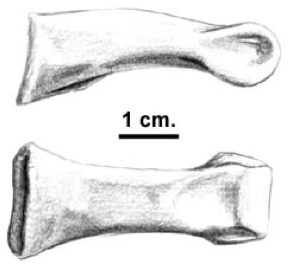
Possible phalanx

The holotype is SAMA P17926. This specimen number was originally assigned to one of the casts, but is currently assigned to the actual specimen after acquisition. The specimen was discovered in the marine Bulldog Shale of the Marree Subgroup, dating to the late Aptian. Apart from the tibia, the find included some small probable fibula fragments. Later a foot digit was referred that might have come from the same species, specimen SAM P18010, but the assignment is dubious. The tibia is broken into about ten larger pieces and roughly 33 centimetres long. It is very slender in build and shows the impression of the ascending process of the astragalus, an ankle bone itself lost. The process seems to have been very long and narrow.

== Classification ==
Due to the paucity of the remains it has been difficult to establish the phylogenetic position of Kakuru. In 1980, Molnar and Pledge gave no more precise determination than a Theropoda incertae sedis, though considered it as a probable coelurosaurian. In 2005, paleontologist Oliver Rauhut considered Kakuru as a potential abelisauroid based on the flattened distal tibia (anterior side). Two separate analyses in 2010 found the holotype tibia of Kakuru to have no distinguishing characteristics and could only be confidently placed in either Averostra or Tetanurae. A 2025 study suggested that Kakuru is similar to the probable unenlagiine specimen (NMV P257601) from Australia and to other coelurosaurians, and that this taxon can be at least referred to Maniraptora.
