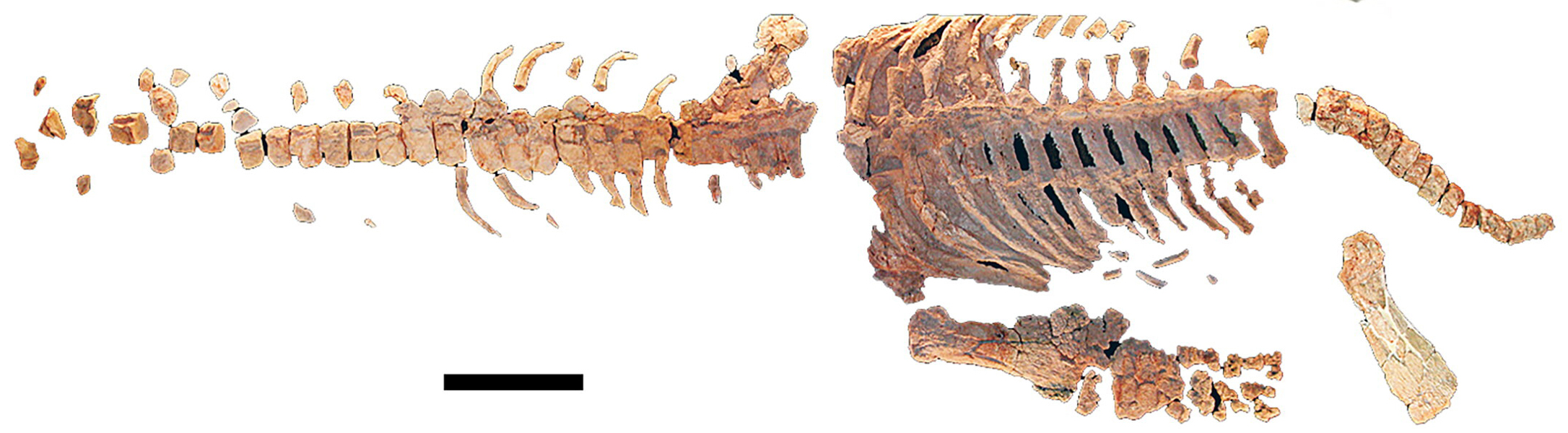
- Holotype skeleton

Scientific classification
- Domain: Eukaryota
- Kingdom: Animalia
- Phylum: Chordata
- Class: Reptilia
- Superorder: †Sauropterygia
- Order: †Plesiosauria
- Superfamily: †Plesiosauroidea
- Clade: †Cryptoclidia
- Genus: †Opallionectes; Kear 2006

Species
- O. andamookaensis Kear 2006

= Opallionectes =

Opallionectes Temporal range: Aptian ~120–113 Ma

Extinct genus of reptiles

Opallionectes andamookaensis (meaning "the opal swimmer from Andamooka") is the name given to a 5 m (16 ft) long cryptoclidian plesiosaur, which is thought to have lived during the early Cretaceous period (Lower middle Aptian), 115 million years ago, in shallow seas covering what is now Australia.

== Description ==
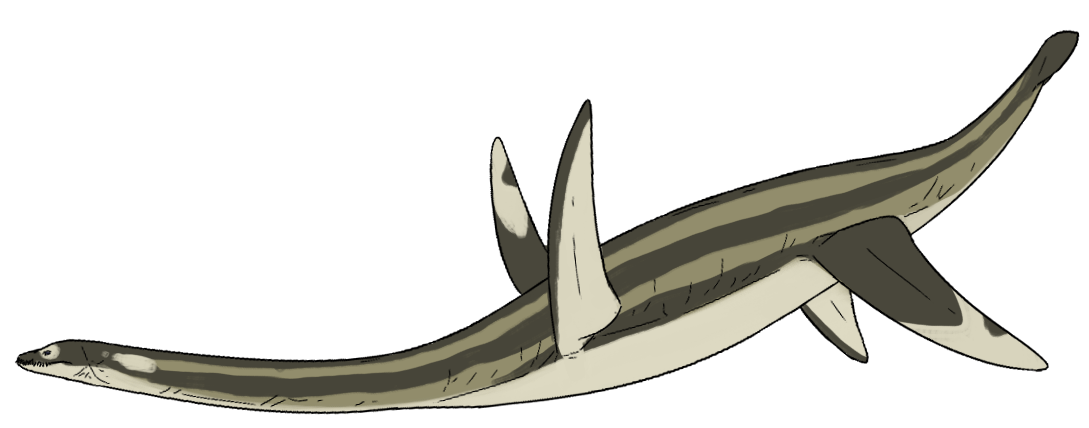
Life restoration

An opalized partial skeleton (including vertebrae, ribs, limb elements, teeth, and associated gastroliths) of the animal has been discovered in an opal mine in the Bulldog Shale at Andamooka in South Australia and described by Kear in 2006. It had fine needle like sharp teeth similar to those of nothosaurs and were probably used to trap small prey such as fish and squids. It is considered a sort of missing link between the much older plesiosaurs, living 165 million years ago, and the ones near the end of the Cretaceous, 66 million years ago, between which there had been a gap in the fossil record. Analyses of the sedimentary structures, fossils, isotope data and climatic modeling show that Opallionectes lived in a region characterized by seasonally cold (possibly freezing) conditions, suggesting that it had developed some adaptation to live in cold water, such as seasonal migration or elevated metabolism.

== See also ==
- List of plesiosaur genera
- Timeline of plesiosaur research
