= Emu Downs Wind Farm =

Wind farm in Western Australia

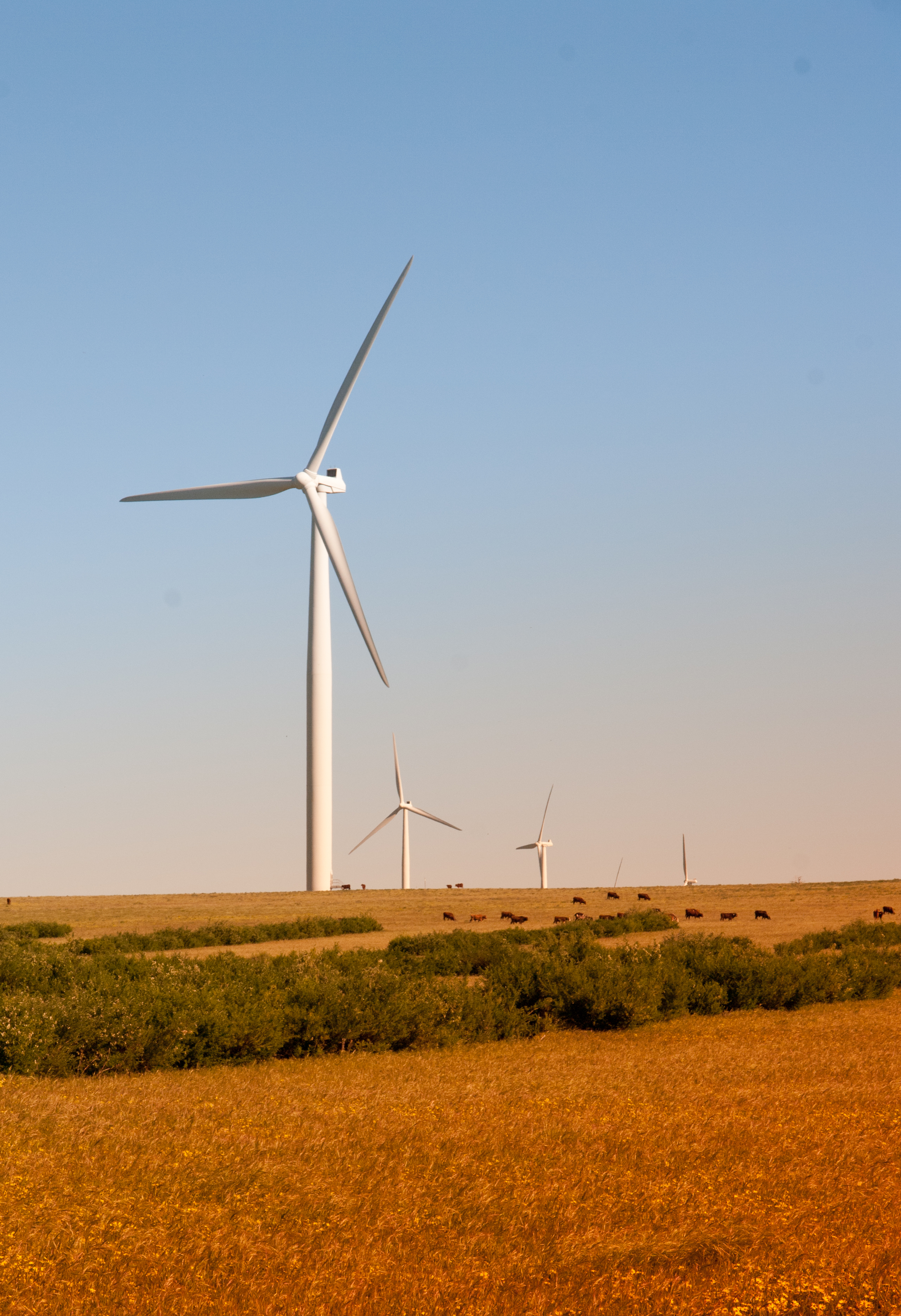
- Wind turbine at Emu Downs
- Country: Australia
- Location: Western Australia
- Coordinates: 30°30′S 115°20′E
- Status: Operational
- Construction began: November 2005
- Commission date: October 2006
- Construction cost: A$180m
- Owner: APA Group
- Operator: EDWF MANAGER PTY LTD

Thermal power station
- Primary fuel: Wind energy

Wind farm
- Type: Onshore
- Hub height: 68.5 metres (225 ft)
- Rotor diameter: 82 metres (269 ft)

Power generation
- Units operational: 48 × 1.65 MW
- Make and model: Vestas V82
- Nameplate capacity: 79.2 MW
- Capacity factor: 36.16% (2007)
- Annual net output: 250.9 GWh (2007)

External links
- Website: www.apa.com.au/our-services/other-energy-services/wind-farms/
- Commons: Related media on Commons

The Emu Downs Wind Farm (30°30′S 115°20′E) is a 79.2 MW wind farm in Western Australia. It was a 50:50 joint development between Griffin Energy and Stanwell Corporation. The site is approximately 200 kilometres north of Perth, near Cervantes. Construction of the $180 million project commenced in November 2005, and the project was commissioned in October 2006.

Emu Downs consists of 48 Vestas wind turbines (each with 1.65 MW generating capacity), a substation, interconnection to the main 132 kV electricity grid, administration and stores buildings, and a network of access roads. The wind farm is close to the coast, with a good quality wind resource that has increased wind speeds and reliability aligning with periods for peak power demand. The prevailing wind blows from the east in the mornings and the Fremantle Doctor from the west in the afternoons.

The wind farm provides electricity to the grid. 260 km (160 mi) to the south there is the Perth Seawater Desalination Plant, and turns water from the Indian Ocean into nearly 152 million litres (40 million gallons) of drinking water per day.

Emu Downs is accredited under the Australian Government's Renewable Energy (Electricity) Act 2000 and as a Green Power Generator by the Sustainable Energy Development Authority. In November 2007, Transfield Services purchased Stanwell Corporation's 50% shareholding.

In June 2011, the wind farm was acquired by the APA Group for $170 million from the failed Griffin Group.

When APA group bought Emu Downs, it realised that there is usually a drop in output in the middle of the day as the wind changes. To balance that and achieve better utilisation of transmission infrastructure, APA installed the 20 MW Emu Downs Solar Farm on the adjacent site. Its peak output is during the time when the wind farm is not at full capacity, so no additional capacity was needed in the substation or grid connection point. The solar farm began operation in December 2017.

The output of both the solar and wind farms is contracted to Synergy until 2030. The adjacent 130 MW Badgingarra Wind Farm was completed in 2019, and has higher capacity factor due to newer components.

== Operations ==
AEMO records begin in September 2006 for the wind farm. The generation table uses AEMO Facility SCADA to obtain generation values for each month. Emu Downs's code is EDWFMAN_WF1, so that is used as part of a SUMIF operation (shown below) on the table to get the total. Note that each month's values start 8 hours into the respective month and extend 8 hours into the next month.

Emu Downs Wind Farm Generation (MWh)
Year	Total	Jan	Feb	Mar	Apr	May	Jun	Jul	Aug	Sep	Oct	Nov	Dec
2006	71,113	N/A	N/A	N/A	N/A	N/A	N/A	N/A	N/A	5,056	20,605	19,574	25,878
2007	250,864	21,724	17,443	27,764	16,301	15,424	28,522	25,814	15,479	13,261	20,693	21,205	27,234

Note: Asterisk indicates power output was limited during the month.
