= Carpentaria Gas Pipeline =

Location
- Country: Australia
- State: Queensland
- Direction: North-South
- Start: Ballera gas plant
- To: Mount Isa, Queensland

General information
- Type: natural gas
- Owner: APA Group
- Operator: APA Group
- Commissioned: 1998

Technical information
- Length: 840 km (520 mi)
- Maximum discharge: 119 terajoules per day (380,000 kWh/ks)
- Diameter: 305 mm (12 in)

The Carpentaria Gas Pipeline is a natural gas pipeline connecting the gas fields to the city of Mount Isa in Queensland, Australia. It is 840 kilometres (520 mi) long between the Ballera gas plant in the Eromanga Basin in southwestern Queensland and Mount Isa, a significant mining community in northwestern Queensland. It was originally built to carry gas from the gas fields in the Eromanga Basin to the industrial areas around Mount Isa. Since 2018 it can also operate to carry gas from the Northern Territory via the Northern Gas Pipeline south to markets along the eastern seaboard of Australia. The supply points of the pipeline are Mica Creek Power Station, Diamantina Power Station, Mount Isa Mines, Century Mine, Phosphate Hill Power Station, and via the 96 kilometres (60 mi) Cannington Lateral, Cannington Mine and Osborne, Queensland. The Australian Pipeline Trust (a predecessor of APA Group) acquired full ownership of the pipeline in 2004. It had previously owned a 70% share with the rest owned by Santos, Delhi Petroleum and Origin Energy.

== See also ==
- List of natural gas pipelines
