= Moomba Adelaide Pipeline System =

Natural gas pipeline in South Australia

Location
- Country: Australia
- State: South Australia
- Direction: North-South
- Start: Moomba
- To: Adelaide, Whyalla, Angaston

General information
- Type: natural gas
- Owner: Epic Energy
- Contractors: Pipelines Authority of South Australia
- Commissioned: 1969

Technical information
- Length: 781 km (485 mi)
- Maximum discharge: 250 TJ/d
- Diameter: 559 mm (22 in)

The Moomba Adelaide Pipeline System is a natural gas pipeline delivering gas from the Cooper Basin gas wells near Moomba to Adelaide, with spur pipelines to Angaston and Whyalla. It can also receive gas from Southeastern Queensland through the QSN Link pipeline owned by APA Group.

The pipeline was developed by the Government of South Australia and commenced operation on 28 November 1969. It was privatised in 1995 and bought by Queensland Investment Corporation, the parent company of Epic Energy in April 2013.

The pipeline system now consists of a total of 1,185 kilometres (736 mi) of high pressure gas pipelines, including 326 kilometres (203 mi) of laterals. The main lateral spurs are the one to Port Pirie and Whyalla and the one to Angaston. The Angaston spur can also feed gas into the Riverland Pipeline owned by Envestra, which supplies gas to Murray Bridge, Berri and Mildura.

The main pipeline is 781 kilometres (485 mi) long and 559 millimetres (22.0 in) in diameter. The lateral to Port Pirie is 78 kilometres (48 mi) at 168 millimetres (6.6 in) continuing 87.7 kilometres (54.5 mi) to Whyalla at 219 millimetres (8.6 in). The Angaston lateral is 38.7 kilometres (24.0 mi) of 219 millimetres (8.6 in) diameter. There are also several loops at the southern end.

The Reeves Plains Power Station was in 2017 proposed to be constructed adjacent to the pipeline and draw gas directly from it. However, support had not been obtained by March 2019, when the project was one of 12 projects shortlisted in the Government of Australia's Underwriting New Generation Investments program.
