= Cooper Basin =

Sedimentary basin in Australia

Coordinates: 26°43′53″S 141°00′21″E

Location of the Cooper Basin in Australia

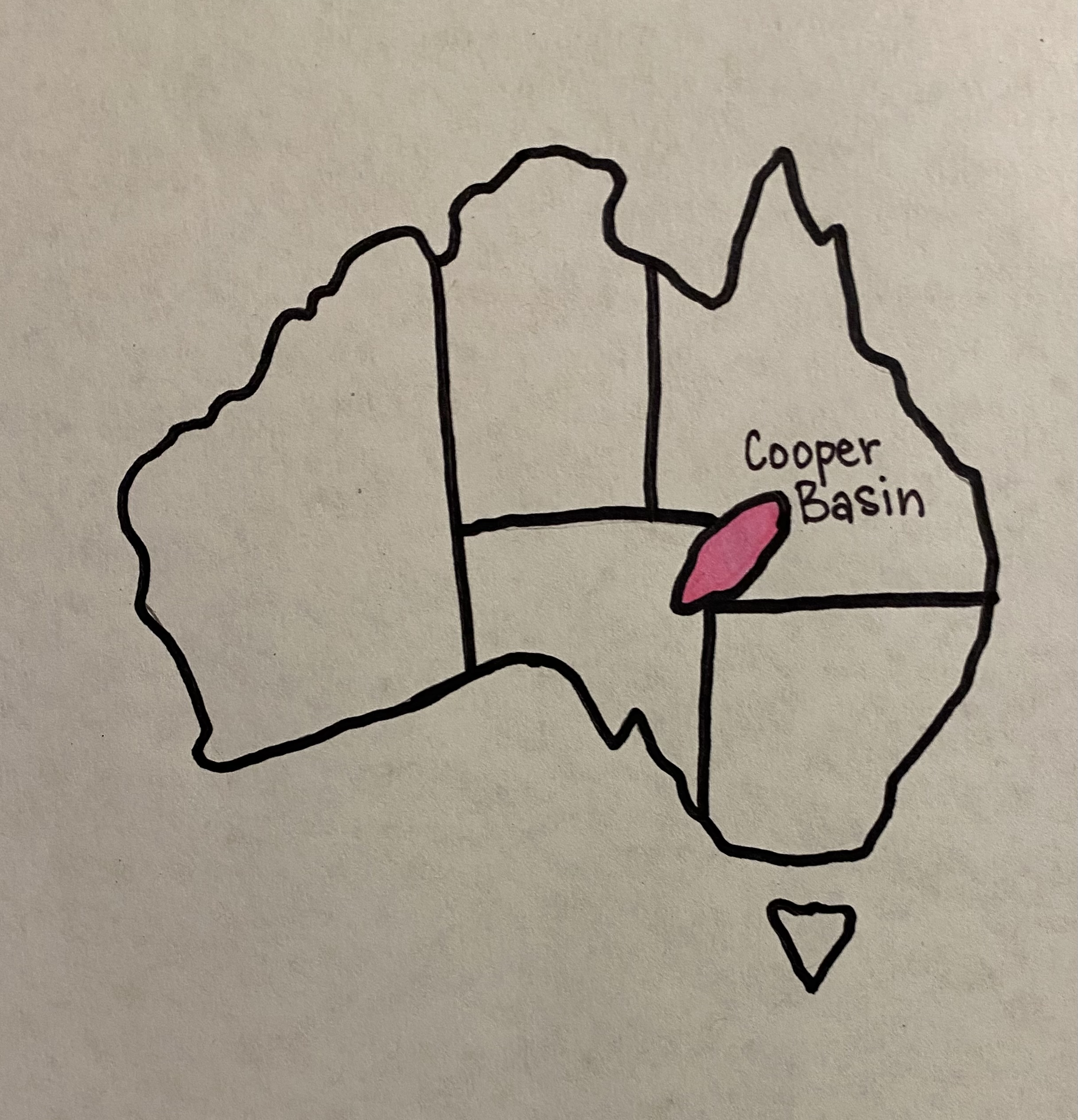

The Cooper Basin is a Permian-Triassic sedimentary geological basin in Australia. The intracratonic rift basin is located mainly in the southwestern part of Queensland and extends into northeastern South Australia. It is named after the Cooper Creek, which is an ephemeral river that runs into Lake Eyre. For most of its extent, it is overlain by the Eromanga Basin. It covers 130,000 km^{2}.

The surface of the Cooper Basin is mostly desert, including parts of the Simpson Desert, the Channel Country and Sturt Stony Desert. Oil and gas exploration in the basin began in 1962.

== Energy resources ==
=== Oil and natural gas ===
The Cooper Basin has the most important on-shore petroleum and natural gas deposits in Australia. The oil and gas window is located 1,250 m below the surface and was originally discovered in the 1960s (although there are larger oil and gas deposits off-shore). The first commercial discovery of gas occurred in 1963. It includes Australia's largest onshore oil field, the Jackson oil field. This field was discovered in 1981. Pipelines transport gas to the major markets of Brisbane, Adelaide and Sydney. Overall about 1,800 petroleum wells have been drilled.

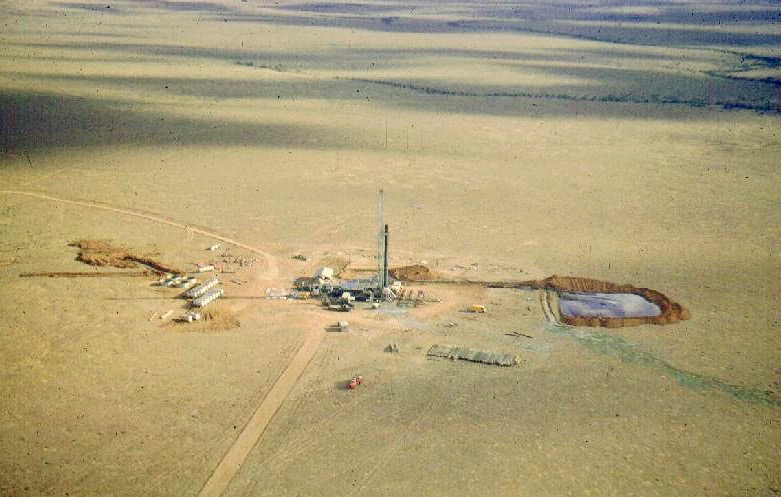
Santos drilling rig near Innamincka in the Cooper Basin, South Australia, 1959

The largest producer in the basin is Santos, with its main production facility at Moomba, South Australia at the head of the Moomba Adelaide Pipeline System. The oil and gas deposits in the Cooper Basin tend to be fairly small and fragmentary, but highly economical given the relatively low cost of drilling and completion. Overall there are 160 gas fields and 75 oil fields in production containing about 630 producing gas wells and more than 340 producing oil wells. Santos began to use solar power to operate its oil and gas extraction in 2019.

There are many small listed companies exploring for additional deposits in the region. These companies include Austin Exploration, Cooper Energy, Beach Energy, Senex Energy, Bridgeport Energy, Strike Energy, Bengal Energy, Acer Energy, Magellan, Impress Energy, Red Sky Energy and many others.

=== Geothermal ===
Within the basin, exploration companies have conducted extensive research to discover if the area is appropriate for large-scale production. They have drilled and measured the temperature in many holes, estimating that hot granite rocks at 3.5 km deep are 240 °C. The Cooper Basin has been selected for the site of a geothermal project, because these rocks are the hottest in the world at economic drilling depths and away from volcanoes. During reservoir stimulation in 2003, induced seismic events up to magnitude 3.7 were observed.

== Impact crater ==
The Basin hides an impact crater created "around 300 million years ago". Its discovery by scientist Tonguç Uysal was revealed in October 2010. The crater's "minimum diameter is 80 km", making it one of the largest of Australia's 30 to 50 known or suspected craters.

== See also ==
- Bowen Basin
- East Warburton Basin
