= Jackson oil field =

Oil field in south western Queensland, Australia

Jackson oil plant
- Location within Queensland

General information
- Coordinates: 27.6343°S 142.3991°E

Jackson oil field is the largest onshore oil field in Australia.

== Geography ==
It is located in Durham, Shire of Bulloo in southwestern Queensland, approximately 160 kilometres (99 mi) west of Thargomindah.

Jackson oil plant is an oil processing facility located near the field. It processes oil from several oil fields in the Eromanga Basin and Cooper Basins.

== History ==
The field was discovered in 1981 and contains 350 million barrels of oil, of which just under one third is recoverable. Peak production occurred in 2000.

One of the wells sprung a leak in 2013, and released about 50,000 litres (11,000 imp gal; 13,000 US gal) per day for a week.
