= Epic Energy =

Australian energy company

- Industry: energy infrastructure
- Headquarters: Adelaide, Australia
- Parent: Queensland Investment Corporation

Epic Energy is an Australian company that owns gas pipelines and wind farms. It has been a wholly owned subsidiary of QIC Global Infrastructure, an arm of the Queensland Investment Corporation, since 2013.

Epic Energy owns and operates both the Moomba Adelaide Pipeline System and the South East Pipeline System in South Australia. It also owns two small wind farms in Victoria – Timboon West Wind Farm and Yawong Wind Farm since April 2019.

== See also ==
- Energy in Australia
