= Beach Energy =

Australian Oil & Gas producing company

Beach Energy Limited
- Formerly: Beach Petroleum
- Type: Public
- Traded as: ASX: BPT
- Industry: Oil and gas
- Founded: 1961
- Founder: Reg Sprigg
- Headquarters: Adelaide, South Australia
- Area served: Australia; New Zealand
- Key people: Brett Woods (CEO)
- Products: Liquified petroleum gas; Natural gas; Crude oil
- Production output: ▼4.2×10^{6} m^{3} (26.7×10^{6} bbl) of oil equivalent (2020)
- Revenue: $1.65 billion (2020)
- Net income: $50 million (2020)
- Total assets: $2.82 billion (2020)
- Website: www.beachenergy.com.au

Beach Energy Limited is an Australian oil and gas exploration and production company based in Adelaide, South Australia. Formerly known as Beach Petroleum, the company changed its name to Beach Energy in December 2009. It is a component of the S&P/ASX 200 index of major Australian companies and in 2020 was the second largest oil producer in Australia after Woodside Energy.

== History ==
Beach was established in 1961, but was a very minor player in the energy sector in its early years. After eventually making discoveries in the Cooper Basin, Beach now holds interests in five producing basins across Australia and New Zealand, including the Cooper Basin, Bass Basin, Otway Basin, Perth Basin and Taranaki Basin.

In 2014, Beach Energy was the largest onshore oil producer in Australia.

In March 2015, it was announced that incoming Beach Energy managing director, Rob Cole, would assume leadership of the company three months earlier than expected, after freeing himself of commitments at his previous firm, Woodside Energy.

In November 2016, Beach Energy announced a Western Flank oil discovery within the Poolowanna Formation of the Eromanga Basin, in ex PEL 91 (Beach 100%).

In September 2017, Beach Energy announced it would acquire Lattice Energy from Origin Energy for $1.585 billion, significantly increasing the company's operations portfolio.
