= Multinet Gas =

Australian energy company

Multinet Gas Networks
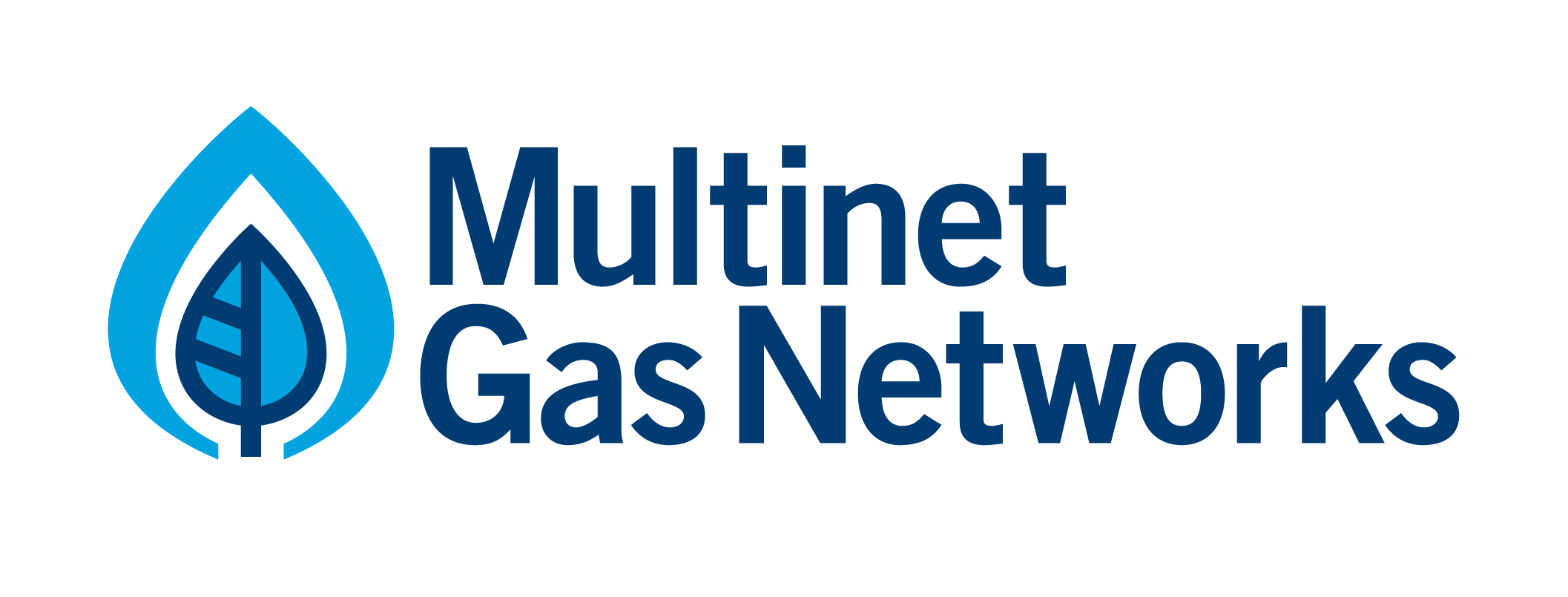
- Industry: Natural Gas Distribution
- Headquarters: Melbourne, Victoria
- Area served: Eastern Melbourne and South Gippsland
- Parent: Cheung Kong Infrastructure
- Website: Multinetgas.com.au

Multinet Gas Networks (MGN) is an Australian energy company and one of three Victorian natural gas distribution networks. MGN is one of three key companies that make up Australian Gas Infrastructure Group (AGIG), the other two being Australian Gas Networks (AGN) and Dampier to Bunbury Pipeline (DBP).

MGN distributes natural gas to around 703,000 homes and 16,000 businesses throughout Melbourne's inner eastern suburbs and outer Eastern Suburbs, the Yarra Ranges, and South Gippsland. MGN delivers gas from the transmission network, through a network of lower pressure, smaller diameter, pipelines to customers. The network comprises 164 km of licensed transmission pipelines, 9,650 km of distribution mains (operating at pressures between 7kPa and 515 kPa), and 179 regulator stations.

MGN has over 1400 km of low pressure (7 kPa) gas mains, some of which are cast iron mains that date back to the 1880s. These older cast iron mains are subject to water ingress during wet weather and as such, are the common cause of supply reliability issues. MGN mains replacement program is aimed at replacing low-pressure gas distribution mains in the network and is targeting to replace all low-pressure mains by 2031. Upgraded low-pressure mains are typically replaced with high-pressure polyethylene gas mains by inserting the new polyethylene pipe into the existing cast iron main. This method minimizes damage to property and offers additional protection to the polyethylene mains.

== History ==
Gas networks were first built in Melbourne by the Metropolitan Gas Company some time before the 1880s. In 1951 the Metropolitan Gas Company was taken over by the government-owned monopoly supplier, the Gas and Fuel Corporation of Victoria (G&FC). G&FC owned the Melbourne gas network area from 1951 until the privatization in 1997.

The company is owned by the DUET Group, which was purchased in 2017, by Cheung Kong Infrastructure (CKI) for A$7.4 billion. CKI controls other energy networks in Australia, including United Energy, an electricity distributor in Melbourne's eastern and south-eastern suburbs and the Mornington Peninsula; CitiPower in Melbourne; Powercor in western Melbourne and western Victoria; and Australian Gas Networks, which distributes gas through Victoria, Queensland and South Australia. After the acquisition, CKI controls three out of five electricity distributors and two out of three gas distributors in Victoria. As of 2018, Multinet Gas is operated as a part of Australian Gas Infrastructure Group (AGIG) in conjunction with the other CKI owned Australian gas distribution Networks.

== Future ==
MGN is part of the commonly managed Australian Gas Infrastructure Group (AGIG) which is leading renewable gas projects across Australia with multiple renewable hydrogen projects in development, and the pilot study of HyP SA (live as of May 2021) successfully blending up to 5% renewable hydrogen into the gas supply of over 700 households in Mitchell Park, South Australia. After a successful start, this is being expanded to over 3,700 homes in 2023.

MGN has been undertaking hydrogen readiness studies to support the network in the transition to renewable gases including to update procedures, test existing pipeline welds, replace incompatible equipment in hazardous areas with higher rated equipment and further compatibility studies. These studies have found that the MGN network is 99% ready for 100% hydrogen.

== See also ==
Australian Gas Networks
