= Iona Gas Plant =

Coordinates: 38.5723°S 143.0386°E

The Iona Gas Plant is a natural gas processing and underground storage facility at Waarre near Port Campbell in the Australian state of Victoria. The Iona Gas Plant is owned by Lochard Energy.

The Iona Gas Plant is on the site of the Iona Gas Field which was discovered in 1988. When the natural gas was depleted, the underground reservoir was converted for storage of processed gas. The processing plant was commissioned for commercial operation in 1999. It receives and processes gas from gas wells in the offshore Casino Gas Field of the Otway Basin. Processed gas is stored underground in a depleted gas field reservoir. Gas from the Iona Gas Plant can be sent to Adelaide in South Australia via the SEAGas pipeline and to Melbourne via the South West Pipeline. The Iona Gas Plant is adjacent to the Otway Gas Plant with a pipeline that enables transfer of gas between the two facilities.

Lochard Energy is a subsidiary of QIC. It bought the Iona facility in 2015 from EnergyAustralia.

A new storage well was drilled in 2018 to increase the available storage of processed gas, as demand for gas in Victoria on cold days in winter exceeds the production capacity on those days.
