= Cadna-owie Formation =

Formation located in South Australia

- Stratigraphic range: Valanginian-Aptian
- Type: Geological formation
- Sub-units: Livingston Tillite Member, Sheehan Tillite Member
- Underlies: Bulldog Shale
- Overlies: Algebuckina Sandstone

Lithology
- Primary: Sandstone, Tillite
- Other: Conglomerate

Location
- Region: South Australia
- Country: Australia
- Extent: Eromanga Basin

The Cadna-owie Formation is a Geological formation of Early Cretaceous age located in the Eromanga Basin.

== Description ==
The exposed Cadna-owie Formation consists of bioturbated, carbonaceous, cross-bedded and level bedded fine to medium sandstone, with minor coarse sandstone intervals, that directly overlies fresh or weathered bedrock. The lower part of the formation incorporates extensive boulder facies, conglomerate, lonestones, dropstones, tillite and tillite lenses described as the Livingston Tillite Member. The upper part of the formation is marked by an unconformity of regional extent with the overlying Trinity Well Sandstone representing a hiatus encompassing the Barremian.

== Environment ==
The Cadna-owie Formation was deposited in very shallow marine to non-marine conditions, with cross-stratification at some levels indicating deposition above storm wave base.

=== Livingston Tillite Member ===
Facies recording extensive boulder beds, conglomerate, and tillite lenses represent flowtill in a proximal fluvioglacial ice-contact setting. Other associated facies record palynoflora used to date the Member as Valanginian.

=== Trinity Well Sandstone ===
The bouldery sandstones, conglomerate, and tillite described as the Sheehan Tillite Member represent subglacial deposition or in a proximal ice-contact setting as well as proglacial, with deposition occurring as lenses of morainal debris shed from icebergs floating in a shallow sea as the glacier melted.

== See also ==
- Fossiliferous stratigraphic units in Australia
  - Wonthaggi Formation, Contemporaneous fossiliferous formation of the Gippsland Basin
  - Bulldog Shale, Aptian to Albian fossiliferous formation
