= South Australian Gas Company =

Former supplier of natural gas

- Company type: Public
- Founded: 1861; 165 years ago
- Defunct: 1993
- Fate: Merged
- Successor: SAGASCO, then Boral
- Headquarters: Adelaide, Australia
- Products: Coal gasification, Natural gas

The South Australian Gas Company (later known as SAGASCO) was formed in 1861 twenty-five years after the colony of South Australia was first settled. The establishment of gasworks from 1863 provided not only industry and employment, but also street lighting and gas appliances, radiating an aura of prosperity over South Australia and especially Adelaide.

== History ==
One of the chief promoters of the South Australian Gas Company and first Chairman of Directors was Henry Ayers, a prominent resident of Adelaide who was associated with the Burra Burra copper mines. The first coal gas works was located at Brompton with others located at Port Adelaide, Glenelg, Thebarton, Osborne, and regional areas when the Provincial Gas Company was amalgamated with the South Australian Gas Company in 1878.

Regular coal gasification began in September 1863. Shovelling coal into the retorts was arduous work as was the use of hand pumps to clear blockages in the gas plants. In 1890, company gas workers formed the South Australian Gas Company’s Employees’ Association committed to an eight-hour day. In 1914, members joined the Federated Gas Employees Industrial Union. Industrial relations remained relatively smooth up until 1937 when workers at the Brompton works halted production by locking themselves in to force management to increase the industrial allowance. A prolonged strike during 1946-1947 seriously disrupted gas supply within the state for almost two months. Improved conditions and facilities were part of the return to work agreement and included blowers designed to remove impurities from the gas pipes.

== Home services ==
To promote the use of gas, the South Australian Gas Company opened a showroom in its Grenfell Street headquarters in 1892. With the move to King William Street in 1903, the company employed female instructors to give cooking demonstrations and to visit the homes of people who had purchased stoves. The publication of the South Australian Gas Company Cookery Book provided advice on stoves as well as a range of recipes. The Home Services Division, operating from the Waymouth Street office from the 1920s, continued to employ women to conduct cooking demonstrations and competitions and to broadcast regular radio programs. In 1961, the South Australian Gas Company was one of South Australia’s major industries serving 130,000 consumers and employing more than 1,200 workers.

== Natural gas ==
In November 1966, the South Australian Gas Company took a new direction entering a contract to purchase natural gas, the first such contract to be signed in Australia. This coincided with the building of the Moomba Adelaide Pipeline System from Moomba to Adelaide. With the South Australian Gas Company becoming a distributor of natural gas from 1969, physical and sectional changes quickly followed including the dismantlement of plant and the reduction of the workforce.

== Merger and takeover ==
In 1988, the South Australian Gas Company merged with the South Australian Oil & Gas Corporation Pty Ltd to form the SAGASCO Holdings Group. In October 1993, SAGASCO Holdings became a wholly owned subsidiary of Boral Limited. The SAGASCO business became part of Origin Energy following its demerger from Boral Limited in 2000.
