= APA Group (Australia) =

Australian gas pipeline and electricity generation company

- Formerly: Australian Pipeline Trust
- Type: Public
- Traded as: ASX: APA
- Industry: Energy infrastructure
- Founded: 2000
- Founder: Australian Gas Light Company
- Headquarters: Sydney, Australia
- Key people: Michael Fraser (Chairman); Adam Watson (Managing Director)
- Revenue: $2.713 billion (2025)
- Number of employees: 2,959 (2025)
- Website: www.apa.com.au

APA Group is an Australian energy infrastructure company that owns and operates a portfolio of assets across all states and territories.

The company was established in 2000, when it demerged from the Australian Gas Light Company and was listed on the Australian Securities Exchange. It is one of the largest natural gas infrastructure business in Australia, transporting around half of the country’s domestic gas supply. In addition to gas pipelines, APA has expanded into renewable energy, firming generation, and electricity transmission as part of the national transition towards net zero emissions by 2050.

== History ==
In June 2000 AGL floated its gas transmission assets as the Australian Pipeline Trust, and listed it as a separate entity on the Australian Securities Exchange (ASX). The ASX code assigned to the securities was APA.

During the next two decades, APA Group expanded its gas transmission network and began diversifying into electricity and renewable energy. The company acquired key assets including the Goldfields Gas Transmission and Parmelia pipelines in Western Australia, the Carpentaria Gas Pipeline in Queensland, and the Murraylink electricity interconnector. In 2009 it opened the QSN Link, which connected Queensland, South Australia and New South Wales, creating an integrated eastern Australian gas market for the first time. In 2011 APA added the Amadeus Gas Pipeline in the Northern Territory and entered the renewables sector with the Emu Downs Wind Farm in Western Australia.

In 2013 APA Group was included in the S&P/ASX 50 Index.

From 2017, the company accelerated its investment in renewable energy, acquiring the Darling Downs Solar Farm, developing the Badgingarra Wind Farm, and opening the Emu Downs Solar Farm. In 2020 APA announced the Northern Goldfields Interconnect, a 580-kilometre pipeline to link the Perth Basin with the Goldfields region, forming an interconnected Western Australian gas grid. The following year it set a target of achieving net zero operational emissions by 2050. In 2022 the company acquired the Basslink electricity interconnector in Tasmania and entered a long-term agreement with Snowy Hydro to construct the Kurri Kurri Lateral pipeline for the Hunter Power Project in New South Wales.

== Operations ==
APA Group’s head office is located at Level 10, 121 Castlereagh Street, Sydney, NSW 2000. The company also maintains multiple smaller offices across Australia.

As of 2025, Michael Fraser is the Independent Chairman of APA Group. He was appointed to this role in 2017.

Adam Watson is CEO & Managing Director. He joined as CFO in November 2020, before taking over as CEO in December 2022.

Pipelines owned or operated by APA Group include:

- SEAGas pipeline
- Roma to Brisbane Pipeline
- Riverland Pipeline
- South West Queensland Pipeline
- Moomba to Sydney Pipeline

Electricity transmission assets include:

- Murraylink electricity interconnector
- Directlink (Terranora) interconnector
- Basslink electricity interconnector

Power stations owned by APA Group include:

- Emu Downs Wind Farm
- Hallett Wind Farm, Hallett, South Australia
- Diamantina Power Station, Mount Isa, Queensland
- Leichhardt Power Station, Mount Isa, Queensland
- X41 Power Station
- Daandine Power Station
