= Australian Gas Networks =

Australian Gas Networks Limited
- Company type: Subsidiary
- Industry: Natural Gas Distribution
- Predecessor: SAGASCO
- Headquarters: Adelaide, Australia
- Area served: South Australia; Queensland; Northern Territory; Victoria; New South Wales
- Key people: Ian Little; MD; John Allpass; Chairman
- Products: Natural gas transmission and distribution
- Operating income: $292.9m (2010/11)
- Net income: $45m (2010/11)
- Parent: Cheung Kong Holdings
- Website: www.australiangasnetworks.com.au

Australian Gas Networks Limited, formerly Envestra Limited, is an Australian energy company that operates natural gas transmission pipelines and distribution networks in South Australia, Victoria, Queensland, New South Wales, and the Northern Territory. The company owns distribution systems in a number of towns and metropolitan areas including Adelaide, Brisbane, Melbourne, Rockhampton, Albury, Alice Springs, Bundaberg and Whyalla. It outsources the operation and management of the assets to the APA Group.

Where AGN Operates

In October 1993, Boral acquired from the South Australian government SAGASCO, its vertically integrated natural gas monopoly. Boral combined SAGASCO's distribution network with businesses it owned in Queensland to form Envestra, which was floated in early 1997. In March 1999, Envestra acquired part of the Gas & Fuel Corporation's distribution network in Victoria, known as the Stratus distribution network, and renamed it Envestra (Vic).

In 2013, APA Group announced an approach to the board of Envestra with an all-share merger proposal. In September 2014, Hong Kong-based Cheung Kong Holdings bought all the shares in Envestra, including APA's 33.4% stake, while APA retained the operation and management of Envestra's assets until 2027. In October 2014, the company's name was changed to Australian Gas Networks Limited.

In June 2025, the Australian Competition & Consumer Commission launched legal action against Australian Gas Networks, alleging it engaged in greenwashing advertising campaigns.

== See also ==
- Multinet Gas
