= Moomba, South Australia =

Restricted access company town in Australia

Moomba
- Town
- Coordinates: 28°06′30″S 140°12′10″E
- Country: Australia
- State: South Australia
- Region: Far North
- City: Gidgealpa
- LGA: Pastoral Unincorporated Area
- Location: 770 km (480 mi) northeast of Adelaide; 302 km (188 mi) northeast of Lyndhurst; 330 km (210 mi) northeast of Leigh Creek; 230 km (140 mi) northwest of Tibooburra

Government
  - State electorate: Stuart
  - Federal division: Grey
- Elevation: 39 m (128 ft)
- Postcode: 5710
- Mean max temp: 29.5 °C (85.1 °F)
- Mean min temp: 15.5 °C (59.9 °F)
- Annual rainfall: 205.7 mm (8.10 in)

Moomba is a restricted access company town located in the Australian state of South Australia within the gazetted locality of Gidgealpa about 770 kilometres (480 mi) north of the state capital of Adelaide. It is operated by Santos Limited for the purpose of exploration and processing of natural gas found in and recovered from the Cooper and Eromanga Basins.

There are a number of partners and contractors on the site including Bureau Veritas, O&G Solutions, SGS, Gearhart, Broadspectrum, OneSteel, Origin Energy, Diversified Construction, Halliburton, Baker Hughes, Schlumberger, ProTechnics a Division of Corelab, GPA Engineering, SAGE Automation and Cactus Wellhead.

== Geography ==
Moomba is situated on the Strzelecki Track which runs through northeastern South Australia and into South West Queensland. The settlement is located on a low-lying plain amongst sand dunes at very little height above sea level. Several hundred kilometres to the southwest lies Lake Eyre which is in fact below sea level.

== History ==
Moomba was established in the 1960s and 70s after discovery of gas and oil. The first commercial gas discovery was made at the Gidgealpa field in 1963. The first Permian oil discovery was made at the Tirrawarra field in 1970. The first Jurassic oil discovery was made at the Strzelecki field in 1978. Gas sales to Adelaide commenced in 1969, and gas sales to Sydney commenced in 1976. Ethane sales to Sydney commenced in 1996

An explosion occurred at the gas plant in January 2004. The explosion made national headlines and caused a costly temporary gas shortage for Santos Ltd.

== Population ==
Santos Ltd employs some 1,201 people who work at Moomba and within the rest of the Cooper Basin (including Ballera in South-West Queensland). All employees work on a fly in-fly out roster basis; there is no permanent resident population in Moomba.

== Facilities ==
Moomba has a sealed airstrip and 'camp' accommodation for its "fly-in, fly-out" residents who are, largely, Santos employees. Scheduled Services are operated by Alliance Airlines, flying passengers daily to and from Adelaide. Members of the public are not able to fly to Moomba; only employees, contractors and authorised visitors are able to visit.

The New South Wales motoring body, NRMA warns travellers of the absence of public facilities at Moomba. It states:

Note that the Moomba plant and field operations are closed to the public and there are no facilities, supplies or accommodation available for travellers.

== Natural Resources Extraction ==
=== Gas ===
The Moomba Adelaide Pipeline System (commenced in 1969) runs 832 kilometres to deliver natural gas extracted from Moomba to Adelaide. This same pipeline is also used to deliver gas from Queensland, an arrangement agreed to in 1991 and the project completed in 1993.

A separate 659 kilometre liquids pipeline runs southwest to Port Bonython, South Australia for overseas export.

A similar gas pipeline to Sydney was completed in 1976, stretching over 1,299 kilometres to Wilton Sydney, with an ethane pipeline along the same route to Botany in Sydney completed in 1996.

According to the Australian Bureau of Statistics:

At Moomba the incoming raw gas stream initially has water and carbon dioxide removed. Next the liquids recovery plant extracts the valuable condensate, ethane and LPG from the gas stream. The resultant sales gas is then pipelined to the Sydney and Adelaide markets. The separated gas liquids as well as the stabilised crude oil from oil fields are directed into the liquids pipeline leading to the fractionation plant at Port Bonython on Spencer Gulf.

Due to an expected peak in availability of gas from Moomba's gas fields in 2006, in June 2007 gas pipeline owner Epic Energy announced moves to link the Moomba pipeline to gas resources in southwest Queensland.

=== Oil ===
Significant oil deposits were discovered in Moomba in 1970 and 1978. These are extracted and supplied via pipelines to sales outlets.

== Climate ==
Moomba experiences a mean maximum temperature of 38.6 °C (101.5 °F) in the hottest month of the year, January, with overnight mean minimum temperatures of 24.5 °C (76.1 °F). July is the coldest month, in winter, with 19.6 °C (67.3 °F) mean maximum temperature and 6.4 °C (43.5 °F) mean minimum temperature. On 12 January 2013, Moomba reached a record maximum temperature of 49.6 °C (121.3 °F), which is one of the hottest temperatures recorded in South Australia.

Moomba sits just on the edge of a rainfall region that has the lowest average rainfall in Australia (a region encompassing Marree and Lake Eyre). Rainfall is highly erratic, and some years it does not rain at all. However, when it does rain it can be extremely heavy and damaging thunderstorms can occur on a few days each year. Light winter rain can also be experienced, but this is just as infrequent and does not happen every year. The wettest month ever recorded was January 1974, with 439.4 millimetres (17.30 in) of rain falling.

Climate data for Moomba (average temperatures from Moomba Airport (1995–2024); average rainfall from Moomba (1972–2005); extremes from both sites)
Month	Jan	Feb	Mar	Apr	May	Jun	Jul	Aug	Sep	Oct	Nov	Dec	Year
Record high °C (°F)	49.6 (121.3)	46.6 (115.9)	45.4 (113.7)	39.9 (103.8)	34.1 (93.4)	30.8 (87.4)	31.9 (89.4)	37.3 (99.1)	41.5 (106.7)	43.5 (110.3)	47.1 (116.8)	49.1 (120.4)	49.6 (121.3)
Mean daily maximum °C (°F)	39.0 (102.2)	37.2 (99.0)	34.2 (93.6)	29.2 (84.6)	23.7 (74.7)	19.9 (67.8)	19.8 (67.6)	22.7 (72.9)	27.2 (81.0)	30.9 (87.6)	34.3 (93.7)	37.0 (98.6)	29.6 (85.3)
Mean daily minimum °C (°F)	24.9 (76.8)	23.6 (74.5)	20.7 (69.3)	15.7 (60.3)	10.6 (51.1)	7.3 (45.1)	6.4 (43.5)	8.1 (46.6)	12.1 (53.8)	15.9 (60.6)	19.6 (67.3)	22.6 (72.7)	15.6 (60.1)
Record low °C (°F)	10.9 (51.6)	13.8 (56.8)	8.6 (47.5)	4.2 (39.6)	1.2 (34.2)	−0.3 (31.5)	−1.4 (29.5)	−0.5 (31.1)	2.1 (35.8)	2.6 (36.7)	6.7 (44.1)	10.0 (50.0)	−1.4 (29.5)
Average rainfall mm (inches)	40.0 (1.57)	26.4 (1.04)	9.9 (0.39)	13.5 (0.53)	16.2 (0.64)	11.2 (0.44)	16.9 (0.67)	8.6 (0.34)	10.9 (0.43)	18.7 (0.74)	13.2 (0.52)	20.2 (0.80)	205.7 (8.11)
Average rainy days (≥ 0.2mm)	3.3	3.2	1.7	2.1	2.8	2.4	3.0	2.1	2.4	2.7	3.5	3.0	32.2
Source: Bureau of Meteorology

== See also ==
- List of extreme temperatures in Australia
