= Otway Basin =

Sedimentary basin in Australia

- Location within Australia
- Coordinates: 38°S 141°E
- Region: Southeastern South Australia and Southwestern Victoria
- Country: Australia
- States: South Australia and Victoria

Characteristics
- On/Offshore: Both
- Part of: Australian Southern Rift System
- Area: 150,000 km^{2}

Geology
- Basin type: rift basin
- Age: Jurassic – late Cretaceous
- Stratigraphy: Crayfish, Eumeralla, Shipwreck, Sherbrook, Wangerrip, Nirranda, Heytesbury, & Whalers Bluff Groups
- Faults: Tartwaup-Mussel & Avoca-Sorell Fault Systems
- Fields: Minerva, Casino, Geographe, & Thylacine Gas Fields

The Otway Basin is a northwest trending sedimentary basin located along the southern coast of Australia. The basin covers an area of 150,000 square kilometers and spans from southeastern South Australia to southwestern Victoria, with 80% lying offshore in water depths ranging from 50-3,000 meters. Otway represents a passive margin rift basin and is one of a series of basins located along the Australian Southern Rift System. The basin dates from the late Jurassic to late Cretaceous periods and formed by multi-stage rifting during the breakup of Gondwana and the separation of the Antarctic and Australian plates. The basin contains a significant amount of natural gas and is a current source of commercial extraction.

== Tectonic setting ==
The Otway Basin developed along the Australian Southern Rift System during late Jurassic to Cenozoic breakup of eastern Gondwana as Antarctica began rifting away from Australia. The basin lies at the transition from a normal-obliquely rifted continental margin to the west to a transform continental margin to the southeast. This transition zone is dominated by transtensional faulting that contributes to the basin's complex structural and depositional history. The margin developed through repeated episodes of extension and thermal subsidence leading up to, and following, the commencement of seafloor spreading between Australian and Antarctica.

== Structural elements ==
The basin includes five significant depocenters. The Inner Otway Basin, Torquay Sub-basin, Morum Sub-basin, Nelson Sub-basin, and Hunter Sub-basin formed as a result of two major, basin-wide rifting phases. At the onset of major north-south rifting in the late Jurassic several east-west trending extensional depocenters developed in the onshore part of the basin to define the Inner Otway Basin. Renewed rifting in the late Cretaceous was driven by a change in crustal extension style from north-south to northeast-southwest resulting in the structurally different, northwest-southeast trending Torquay, Morum, Nelson, and Hunter Sub-basins in the mid- and off-shore. Following each rifting episode the basin underwent compressional phases resulting in the inversion and wrenching of pre-existing structures.

== Tectonostratigraphic evolution ==
Eight distinct and regionally mappable stratigraphic groups define the Otway Basin fill.

=== Initial rifting (Early Cretaceous) ===
Basin rift system initiated at the onset of north-south extension between the Australian and Antarctic plates in the late Jurassic. Growing extensional structures were filled with ~5000 meters of continental and fluvio-lacustrine sediments that comprise the Crayfish Group. In the Aptian the basin experienced widespread thermal subsidence where ~4000 meters of fluvial and lacustrine sediments of the Eumeralla Formation were deposited in the progressively widening sag basin.

=== Compression and uplift (Mid Cretaceous) ===
The first phase of rifting ceased in the Albian at which time the basin underwent an erosive compressional period leading to the basin wide Otway unconformity.

=== Renewed rifting (Late Cretaceous) ===
After a 6.5 Ma hiatus, rifting renewed and rift-related subsidence began in the Turonian. This rifting phase is marked by a change in crustal extension direction from north-south to northeast-southwest resulting in the deposition of large and deep depocenters in the mid- and off-shore basin. Syn-rift deposition includes ~1300 meters of fluvial and deltaic sediments that comprise the Shipwreck Group. A major marine transgression in the Campanian produced ~5000 meters of deltaic and marine Sherbrook Group sediments.

=== Continental breakup (Late Maastrichtian) ===
In the late Cretaceous rifting transitioned to seafloor spreading marking the onset of post-rift passive margin conditions within the Otway Basin. As Australian-Antarctic plate clearance continued and the passive margin developed further the basin experienced widespread thermal subsidence leading to an increase in accommodation space. Deposition from the late Maastrichtian to present day is marked by a succession of marine and carbonate accumulations of the Wangerrip, Nirranda, Heytesbury, and Whalers Bluff Groups, separated by distinct unconformities associated with basin-wide compression events.
