= Eromanga Basin =

Sedimentary basin in Australia

Coordinates: 26°S 140°E

Location of Eromanga Basin in Australia

The Eromanga Basin is a large Mesozoic sedimentary basin in central and northern Australia. It covers parts of Queensland, the Northern Territory, South Australia, and New South Wales, and is a major component of the Great Artesian Basin. The Eromanga Basin covers 1,000,000 km^{2} and overlaps part of the Cooper Basin. It is named for the town of Eromanga, Queensland.

The basin is made of sandstone, siltstone, mudstone, coal, shale, and red beds. Two impact structures have been identified in the basin, Mount Toondina crater and Tookoonooka crater.

In Queensland and South Australia the Eromanga Basin has been explored and developed for petroleum production. Commercial quantities of gas were first discovered in 1976 and oil in 1978. The basin contains Australia's largest onshore oilfield, the Jackson oil field. Moomba is the centre of South Australia's oil production in the basin.

The geology of the portion of the Eromanga Basin in New South Wales remains under-explored.

During the middle of the Cretaceous period much of inland Australia was flooded by the Eromanga Sea, which shares its name with the contemporary Basin. Various fossil sites spanning the region record a diversity of marine life, including Plesiosaurs and Ichthyosaurs, that were abundant in the Eromanga Sea during the Aptian and Albian ages.

== See also ==
- Energy policy of Australia
- Geology of New South Wales
- Geology of South Australia
- Geology of Queensland
