= University of Melbourne Faculty of Engineering and Information Technology =

Coordinates: 37.799627°S 144.961773°E

The Faculty of Engineering and Information Technology at the University of Melbourne is the oldest engineering and information technology faculty in Australia. It was established in 1861, 8 years after the establishment of the University of Melbourne, and was made a Faculty in 1889. It teaches a substantial number of undergraduate and postgraduate students (around 4,500, including over 1,400 international students from over 50 countries), as well as being a significant centre for engineering research, employing many leaders in their fields. In 2011 the Faculty of Engineering and Information Technology celebrated its sesquicentenary and the School developed a large range of events and activities to mark the occasion.

== Research ==
The Faculty of Engineering and Information Technology is one of the largest engineering research institutions in Australia, with a 2010 research income of $90 million. The School conducts leading interdisciplinary research in four key themes – Biomedical, Structured Matter, Information and Communication Systems, and Sustainable Systems and Energy.

The School is home to a range of key research centres, institutes, groups and laboratories, including:

- Advanced Centre for Automotive Research and Testing (ACART)
- ARC Research Network on Intelligent Sensors, Sensor Networks and Information Processing
- Australia-China Centre on Water Resources Research
- Australian Integrated Multimodal EcoSystem (AIMES)
- Centre for Energy-Efficient Telecommunications
- Centre for Nanoscience and Nanotechnology (CNST)
- Centre for Spatial Data Infrastructures and Land Administration
- Cloud Computing and Distributed Systems (CLOUDS) Laboratory
- CRC for Greenhouse Gas Technologies (CO2CRC)
- CRC for Irrigation Futures
- CRC for Polymers
- CRC for Spatial Information (CRC-SI)
- eWater CRC
- Gait Analysis & Gait Rehabilitation (NHMRC Centre of Clinical Research Excellence)
- Infrastructure Asset Protection and Management
- Institute for a Broadband Enabled Society
- Interaction Design Laboratory
- Melbourne Systems Laboratory
- National ICT Australia (NICTA)
- Neuroengineering Research Laboratory
- Nonlinear Signal Processing Lab
- Particulate Fluids Processing Centre (PFPC) (ARC Special Research Centre)
- Peer-to-Peer Networks and Applications Research Laboratory
- Research Network for a Secure Australia (RNSA)
- Uniwater

== Deans of the Faculty ==
1889 – 1909	W.C. Kernot
1909 – 1910	G. Higgins
1910 – 1931	H. Payne
1932 – 1936	W.N. Kernot
1937 – 1943	A.F. Burstall
1943	J.N. Greenwood
1944 – 1945	A.F. Burstall
1946	C.W. Sexton
1947	R.R. Blackwood
1948 – 1949	J.A.L. Matheson
1950 – 1952	C.E. Moorhouse
1953 – 1955	H.K. Worner
1956 – 1957	A.J. Francis
1958 – 1959	H.W. Worner
1960 – 1961	P.L. Henderson
1962 – 1965	C.E. Moorhouse
1966	P.W. Whitton
1967 – 1969	M.E. Hargreaves
1970 – 1976	S.R. Siemon
1977 – 1979	J.B. Potter
1980 – 1987	L.K. Stevens
1988 – 1996	W.W.S. Charters
1997 – 2002	D.G. Wood
2003 – 2006	J. van Deventer
2007 – 2018	I.M.Y. Mareels
2018 –	Mark Cassidy

== The Kernot Memorial Medal ==
The Kernot Memorial Medal honours distinguished engineering achievement in Australia, and was established in memory of Professor William Charles Kernot, the first professor of Engineering at the University of Melbourne. The award is made by the University of Melbourne's Faculty of Engineering and IT following the recommendation of a selection committee. This committee comprises the Heads of Schools within the Faculty, and two members who do not hold teaching or research appointments in the University. It is open to persons resident in Australia for at least five out of the last seven years before the award. Throughout its history, the Kernot Memorial Medal has been presented to many distinguished Australian engineers.

== Recipients of The Kernot Memorial Medal ==
Sourced from the Faculty of Engineering and Information Technology at the University of Melbourne:

- 1926 Francis William Clements
- 1927 Robert William Chapman
- 1928 Maurice Edwin Kernot
- 1929 Joseph Newell Reeson
- 1930 John Monash
- 1931 George Kenneth Williams
- 1932 John Robert Kemp
- 1933 John J C Bradfield
- 1934 Herbert Reah Harper
- 1935 Edgar G Ritchie
- 1936 Frederick W H Wheadon
- 1937 Anthony George Michell
- 1938 George Julius
- 1939 Charles Frederick Broadhead
- 1943 Essington Lewis
- 1944 Clive S Steele
- 1945 Daniel McVey
- 1946 John G Burnell
- 1947 Thomas H Upton
- 1948 Walter E Bassett
- 1949 Lewis R East
- 1950 A K Hacke
- 1951 Charles Home Kernot
- 1952 Russell J Dumas
- 1953 E D Shaw
- 1954 Harry Hey
- 1955 Louis Francis Loder
- 1956 William H R Nimmo
- 1957 Willis H Connolly
- 1958 William Hudson
- 1959 Lawrence Wackett
- 1960 Donald V Darwin
- 1961 Asdruebal J Keast
- 1962 B B Lewis
- 1963 A W Knight
- 1964 Lindesay Clark
- 1965 Maurice Mawby
- 1966 Philip Baxter
- 1967 James A L Matheson
- 1968 Lawrence P Coombes
- 1969 George Fischer
- 1970 Ian McLennan
- 1971 Ian Langlands
- 1972 Robert Blackwood
- 1973 Howard K Worner
- 1974 David M Myers
- 1975 James Foots
- 1976 John Holland
- 1977 Brian Inglis
- 1978 Frank Espie
- 1979 Kenneth Hunt
- 1980 John W Connell
- 1981 H W Worner
- 1982 Bernard Callinan
- 1983 Arthur J Francis
- 1984 David H Trollope
- 1985 Franco Belgiorno-Nettis
- 1986 S R Siemon
- 1987 Peter T Fink
- 1988 Brian Loton
- 1989 Arvi Parbo
- 1990 Harry S Wragge
- 1991 Henry Reginald Clive Pratt
- 1992 G P Cook
- 1993 Owen E Potter
- 1994 John M Schubert
- 1995 Robert H Brown
- 1996 Robin J Batterham
- 1997 Jorg Imberger
- 1998 Ian Vaughan
- 1999 Patrick Boland
- 2007 Don M Grant
- 2011 Jim Fox
- 2021 Jack Zhang
- 2022 Collette Burke
- 2023 Grant Maher
- 2024 Karen Dobson
- 2025 Kate Cole

== Supporters of the Faculty ==
The engineering school has benefited from close links to industry including donations for its research from a number of engineering companies such as Hardcastle & Richards.
