= Gasometer (disambiguation) =

A gasometer is a gas holder. The word gasometer may also refer to:

- Gasometer Oberhausen, a former gas holder converted to an exhibition space
- Gasometer, Vienna, any of four former gas tanks in Vienna, Austria
- Gasometer (Vienna U-Bahn), a station on line U3
- Gasometer Hotel, now known as the Smith St Hotel

== See also ==
- El Nuevo Gasómetro, nickname of Estadio Pedro Bidegain, a stadium in Buenos Aires, Argentina
- Estadio Gasómetro, a defunct stadium in Buenos Aires, Argentina
- Gas meter
