= Peter Nicol Russell Memorial Medal =

Award from Engineers Australia

- Awarded for: Notable contribution to the science and/or practice of engineering in Australia
- Country: Australia
- Presented by: Engineers Australia
- First award: 1923
- Website: www.engineersaustralia.org.au/about-us/excellence-awards-program/distinguished-career-awards

The Peter Nicol Russell Memorial Medal is awarded by Engineers Australia. It has been awarded since 1923 when its first recipient was the Australian engineer Prof William Henry Warren. It is given annually to an Honorary Fellow of Engineers Australia who has significantly advanced engineering in Australia. The award consists of a framed certificate and medal.

== Recipients ==
- 2025: Robin J. Batterham
- 2024: Marlene Kanga
- 2023: Dianne Boddy
- 2022: Peter Cockbain
- 2021: Elizabeth Taylor
- 2020: Harry Poulos
- 2019: Brian David Outram Anderson AC FRS
- 2018: Alan Simon Finkel AO
- 2017: Mary O'Kane AC
- 2016: Richard Albert Kell
- 2015: Eric Neal
- 2014: Maxwell Gordon Lay
- 2013: Barry Grear
- 2012: John Grill
- 2011: Andrew Richard Downing
- 2010: Allan William Roberts
- 2009: Michael Bruce Dureau
- 2008: Martin Hallowell Thomas
- 2007: Else Egede Shepherd
- 2006: Peter Farrell
- 2005: Graeme Jameson
- 2004: John Laurie
- 2003: Arthur Bishop
- 2002: Kenneth Michael
- 2001: Wallace Macarthur King
- 2000: Tom Connor
- 1999: Donald George Fry
- 1998: John Nutt
- 1997: Peter Owen Miller
- 1996: Andrew Bruce Sinclair
- 1995: Jorg Imberger
- 1994: Robert Culver
- 1993: William Harold Clough
- 1992: Michael Anthony Sargent
- 1991: Rolf G. H. Prince
- 1990: Donald James Little
- 1989: Charles Harold Warman
- 1988: Peter Thomas Fink
- 1987: John Douglas Correll Crisp
- 1986: Lance Aubrey Endersbee
- 1985: Alfred William Tyree
- 1984: Douglas Gordon Price
- 1983: Kenneth Henderson Hunt
- 1982: Donald Hector Aitken
- 1981: William Piper Brown
- 1980: Roger Neill Morse
- 1979: Don Watkyn Woods
- 1978: Charles Newton Barton
- 1977: David Milton Myers
- 1976: Louis Matheson
- 1975: Jack William Roderick
- 1974: John Clifton Vaughan Holland
- 1973: Ian Landlands
- 1972: Bernard James Callinan
- 1971: Raymond Arthur Priddle
- 1970: Wilbur Norman Christiansen
- 1969: Julian Randal Dridan
- 1968: Willis Henry Connolly
- 1967: Ian Munro McLennan
- 1966: Donald Victor Darwin
- 1965: Thomas Bruce Nicol
- 1964: Robert Rutherford Blackwood
- 1963: Allan Walton Knight
- 1962: Capt George Ian Hutcheson
- 1961: James Arthur Holt
- 1960: Albert Edwin Axon
- 1959: William Rayner Hebblewhite
- 1958: Walter Eric Bassett
- 1957: Lewis Ronald East
- 1956: John Proctor Tivey
- 1955: Alan Burn
- 1954: Louis Francis Loder
- 1953: Alex Broughton Doyle
- 1952: Russell John Dumas
- 1951: John Gurner Burnell
- 1950: William Hogarth Robertson Nimmo
- 1949: Thomas Haynes Upton
- 1948: Robert Lawson
- 1947: Brig James Montagu Christian Corlette
- 1946: Walter Harold Myers
- 1945: William Goodman
- 1944: John Madsen
- 1943: Edgar Gowar Ritchie
- 1942: John Robert Kemp
- 1941: Robert James Boyd
- 1940: Alexander James Gibson
- 1939: Henry Barraclough
- 1938: Herbert Reah Harper
- 1937: Dudley Francis John Harricks
- 1936: Hugh Rose Forbes Mackay
- 1935: John Henry Osborn Eaton
- 1934: Francis William Clements
- 1933: Maurice Edwin Kernot
- 1932: John Job Crew Bradfield
- 1931: Roger William Hercules Hawken
- 1930: Henry Harvey Dare
- 1929: John Monash
- 1928: Robert William Chapman
- 1927: George Alfred Julius
- 1926: Orlando William Brain
- 1925: Richard Ernest Sexton
- 1924: James Fraser
- 1923: William Henry Warren

== See also ==
- List of engineering awards
