= Joseph Newell Reeson =

Australian civil engineer

Joseph Newell Reeson (1868–1953) was an Australian civil engineer who pioneered the use of welding for large steel structures.

== Early life and education ==
Reeson was born in England on 2 June 1868 and attended Kensington Grammar School. He worked for the Gas Light and Coke Company at their Beckton works and at the same time continued his education at the City of London College. He was appointed to the roles of Engineer to the St Pancras works in 1903, and the Shoreditch works in 1905, and in 1906 he was appointed Resident Engineer of the Beckton works of the Gas Light and Coke Co.

== Major works ==
In 1913, he migrated to Australia and took up a position as Engineer-in-Chief and Technical Adviser with the Metropolitan Gas Company in Melbourne. and continued there until 1926. During this time he developed electric arc welding for the construction and maintenance of gas-works plant. This included the construction of the first large electric arc welded steel structure in the world, when the No 3 gasholder at the Fitzroy Gasworks was completed in 1923. This was dismantled in 1978, and the site covered over, but buried remains may still be present. Reeson was also responsible for erecting constructional workshops, which made the company self-contained in manufacture and maintenance.

== Affiliations and awards ==
Reeson was elected an Associate Member of the Institute of Civil Engineers in 1894, and full Member in 1914 and was a Member of Council from 1939 to 1942, representing Australia. He other affiliations included: Member of the Institution of Engineers, Australia and president 1923 and 1924, Member of the Institution of Gas Engineers, and one of the founders and chairman of the directors of the Allied Societies Trust, a role he held until a year or two before his death. In 1926, he was awarded a Telford Premium medal for his Paper on “ The Influence of Electric Welding in the Design and Fabrication of Plant and Structures.” He was also one of the first recipients of the Kernot Memorial Medal awarded in 1929 by the University of Melbourne for his research into electric welding.

He died at Melbourne, Australia on 15 July 1953 leaving an estate valued at £33,103 to a daughter-in-law and granddaughter.
