= List of acts of the Parliament of Victoria from 1860 =

This is a list of acts of the Parliament of Victoria, Australia for the year 1860.

== 1860 ==
The first session of the second parliament of Victoria.

Short title, or popular name	Citation	Royal assent
Long title
	23 Vict. No. 92	8 June 1860
An Act to amend an Act intituled "An Act to authorize the construction of a Main Trunk Line of Railway from Melbourne to the River Murray and of a Main Trunk Line of Railway from Geelong to Ballaarat." (Note: 21 Vict. No. 35) (Repealed by Public Works Statute 1865 (29 Vict. No. 289))
	23 Vict. No. 93	8 June 1860
An Act to amend the provisions of an Act (Note: 22 Vict. No. 74) incorporating the Shareholders in the National Bank of Australasia. (Repealed by 43 Vict. No. 641)
	23 Vict. No. 94	8 June 1860
An Act to amend the Law relating to Registration. (Repealed by Electoral Act 1863 (27 Vict. No. 168))
	23 Vict. No. 95	8 June 1860
An Act to provide for the better regulation and discipline of Armed Vessels in the service of Her Majesty's Local Government in Victoria. (Disallowed)
	23 Vict. No. 96	8 June 1860
An Act to incorporate the Board of Land and Works and to vest in the said Board the Undertaking of the Geelong and Melbourne Railway Company and other property. (Repealed by Public Works Statute 1865 (29 Vict. No. 289))
	23 Vict. No. 97	8 June 1860
An Act to repeal the fourth and sixteenth sections of "The Australasian Fire and Life Insurance Company's Act 1857" (Note: Australasian Fire and Life Insurance Company's Act 1857 (21 Vict. No. 34)) and to substitute other provisions in lieu thereof.
	24 Vict. No. 98	22 August 1860
An Act to appropriate the Consolidated Revenue to the service of the Year One thousand eight hundred and sixty and for other purposes.
	24 Vict. No. 99	22 August 1860
An Act for the administration of the Estates of Deceased Persons in certain cases. (Repealed by 27 Vict. No. 230)
	24 Vict. No. 100	22 August 1860
An Act further to amend and to consolidate the Law of Evidence. (Repealed by Statute of Evidence 1864 (27 Vict. No. 197))
	24 Vict. No. 101	22 August 1860
An Act for supplying the District of the Ovens with Water.
Bendigo Gas Company's Act 1860	24 Vict. No. 102	22 August 1860
An Act to incorporate a Company to be called "The Bendigo Gas Company" and for other purposes.
Collingwood Fitzroy and District Gas and Coke Company's Act 1860	24 Vict. No. 103	22 August 1860
An Act to incorporate a Company to be called "The Collingwood Fitz Roy and District Gas and Coke Company" and for other purposes.
	24 Vict. No. 104	22 August 1860
An Act for the Remission of Penalties and the Discharge of Persons from Imprisonment in certain cases. (Repealed by Public Moneys Act 1890 (54 Vict. No. 1132))
Beechworth Water Works Act 1860	24 Vict. No. 105	18 September 1860
An Act for enabling the Municipal Council of Beechworth to construct Water Works and supply their District with Water and for other purposes.
	24 Vict. No. 106	18 September 1860
An Act to alter the Boundaries of the Electoral District of Belfast. (Repealed by Electoral Act Amendment Act 1876 (40 Vict. No. 548))
	24 Vict. No. 107	18 September 1860
An Act to indemnify all Persons who may have advised signed or issued any Warrant varying the appropriation of certain portions of the sums of £75,000 and £110,000 appropriated in aid of District Road Boards in the years 1858 and 1859 respectively and of the sum of £15,000 appropriated in aid of Municipalities to be created during the year 1858 or who may have acted under the authority of the same.
	24 Vict. No. 108	18 September 1860
An Act for securing the freedom of the deliberations of Parliament and for preventing disorderly Meetings. (Repealed by Unlawful Assemblies and Party Processions Statute 1865 (28 Vict. No. 247))
	24 Vict. No. 109	18 September 1860
An Act to limit the Liability of Mining Partnerships. (Repealed by Companies Statute 1864 (27 Vict. No. 190))
	24 Vict. No. 110	18 September 1860
An Act to amend an Act intituled "An Act for Improvements in Fitz Roy Ward in the City of Melbourne." (Note: 17 Vict. No. 31)
	23 Vict. No. 111	18 September 1860
An Act to remove doubts as to the validity of certain Mining Regulations and Bye-Laws. (Repealed by Mining Statute 1865 (29 Vict. No. 291))
	24 Vict. No. 112	18 September 1860
An Act to amend the Law of Property and for other purposes.
	24 Vict. No. 113	18 September 1860
An Act to amend the Law relating to Volunteer Corps. (Repealed by Volunteer Statute 1864 (27 Vict. No. 205))
	24 Vict. No. 114	18 September 1860
An Act to amend an Act intituled "An Act for the establishment of Municipal Institutions in Victoria." (Note: 18 Vict. No. 15) (Repealed by Municipal Corporations Act 1863 (27 Vict. No. 184))
	24 Vict. No. 115	18 September 1860
An Act to amend an Act intituled "An Act for amending the Laws relating to the Gold Fields." (Note: 21 Vict. No. 32) (Repealed by Mining Statute 1865 (29 Vict. No. 291))
	24 Vict. No. 116	18 September 1860
An Act to amend an Act (Note: 13 Vict. No. 20 (NSW)) intituled "An Act to amend an Act (Note: 11 Vict. No. 59 (NSW)) intituled 'An Act to enable certain Public Hospitals to sue and be sued in the name of their Treasurer and to provide for the taking and holding of real property belonging to such hospitals respectively.'" (Repealed by Hospitals and Charities Act 1890 (54 Vict. No. 1099))
Land Act 1860 (repealed)	24 Vict. No. 117	18 September 1860
An Act for regulating the Sale of Crown Lands and for other purposes. (Repealed by Land Act 1862 (25 Vict. No. 145))
	24 Vict. No. 118	18 September 1860
An Act to amend an Act intituled "An Act to extend the provisions of the Acts relating to legally qualified Medical Practitioners." (Note: 17 Vict. No. 14) (Repealed by Medical Practitioners Statute 1865 (28 Vict. No. 262))
	24 Vict. No. 119	18 September 1860
An Act to repeal certain clauses of the "Customs Act 1857" and to substitute others in lieu thereof. (Repealed by Customs Act 1883 (47 Vict. No. 768))

== Sources ==
- "1860 Victorian Historical Acts". AustLII.
