= List of acts of the Parliament of Victoria from 1942 =

This is a list of acts of the Parliament of Victoria, Australia for the year 1942.

== 1942 ==
Short title, or popular name	Citation	Royal assent
Long title
	No. 4880	2 July 1942
An Act to apply out of the Consolidated Revenue the sum of Three million three hundred and forty-five thousand three hundred and ninety-three pounds to the service of the year One thousand nine hundred and forty-two and One thousand nine hundred and forty-three.
	No. 4881	9 July 1942
An Act to apply out of the Consolidated Revenue the sum of Five hundred and seventy-two thousand two hundred and four pounds to the service of the year One thousand nine hundred and forty-one and One thousand nine hundred and forty-two.
Limbless Soldiers Trust Act 1942 (repealed)	No. 4885	31 August 1942
An Act to vary the Objects of certain Trusts declared in two Trust Deeds relating to Funds raised for the Benefit of Limbless Soldiers in Victoria, and for other purposes. (Repealed by Statute Law Revision Act 2013 (No. 70 of 2013)
	No. 4886	2 September 1942
An Act to apply out of the Consolidated Revenue the sum of Three million three hundred and thirty-nine thousand eight hundred and eighty-three pounds to the service of the year One thousand nine hundred and forty-two and One thousand nine hundred and forty-three.
National Security (Emergency Powers) Continuation Act 1942 (repealed)	No. 4887	2 September 1942
An Act to continue the Operation of the National Security (Emergency Powers) Act 1939. (Note: National Security (Emergency Powers) Act 1939 (No. 4645)) (Repealed by National Security (Repeal) Act 1945 (No. 5073))
Income Tax (War-time Collection) Act 1942	No. 4888	2 September 1942
An Act relating to the Collection of certain Arrears of Taxes on Income during the Present War, and for other purposes.
	No. 4890	14 September 1942
An Act to apply out of the Consolidated Revenue the sum of One million seven hundred and fifty-three thousand three hundred and forty-five pounds to the service of the year One thousand nine hundred and forty-one and One thousand nine hundred and forty-two.
Constitution Act Amendment Act 1942	No. 4896	21 September 1942
An Act to amend Sub-section (2) of Section Twenty-seven of The Constitution Act Amendment Act 1928. (Note: Constitution Act Amendment Act 1928 (19 Geo. V. No. 3660))
Adoption of Children Act 1942	No. 4903	26 October 1942
An Act to amend the Adoption of Children Act 1928. (Note: Adoption of Children Act 1928 (19 Geo. V. No. 3605))
	No. 4904	2 November 1942
An Act to apply out of the Consolidated Revenue the sum of Three million six hundred and twenty-one thousand five hundred and two pounds to the service of the year One thousand nine hundred and forty-two and One thousand nine hundred and forty-three.
Financial Emergency (Grants and Funds) Act 1942	No. 4909	30 November 1942
An Act to further amend Part IV. of the Financial Emergency Act 1931. (Note: Financial Emergency Act 1931 (No. 3961))
Administration and Probate Duties Act 1942	No. 4911	30 November 1942
An Act to continue the Operation of Part III. of the Finance Act 1930. (Note: Finance Act 1930 (No. 3889))
Survival of Actions Act 1942	No. 4918	7 December 1942
An Act to amend the Law as to the Effect of Death in relation to Causes of Action.
Victorian Inland Meat Authority Act 1942	No. 4927	21 December 1942
An Act to make Provision with respect to the Constitution of an Inland Meat Authority and the Objects Functions Powers and Duties of such Authority, and for other purposes.
Railways (Long Service) Act 1942	No. 4930	21 December 1942
An Act to make Provision with respect to the Granting of Long Service Leave with Pay to certain Officers and Employés in the Railway Service.
Coal Mine Workers Pensions Act 1942	No. 4932	30 December 1942
An Act to prohibit the Employment in the Goal Mining Industry of certain Persons of or above the Age of Sixty Years and of certain other Persons of or above the Age of Sixty-five years and to make Provision for and with respect to the Payment of Pensions to such Persons and certain other Persons, and for other purposes.
Metropolitan Gas Company's Act 1942 (repealed)	No. 4935	30 December 1942
An Act to amend Section Twenty-nine of The Metropolitan Gas Company's Act 1878. (Note: Metropolitan Gas Company's Act 1878 (41 Vict. No. 586)) (Repealed by Statute Law Revision Act 1995 (No. 11 of 1995))
Yannanthan and Triholm Railway (Dismantling) Act 1942 (repealed)	No. 4936	30 December 1942
An Act to provide for the Dismantling of the Section of the Koo-wee-rup to McDonald's Track Railway between Yannathan and Triholm and for other purposes. (Repealed by Transport Act 1983 (No. 9921))
Administration and Probate (Amendment) Act 1942	No. 4940	30 December 1942
An Act to amend Section One hundred and sixty of the Administration and Probate Act 1928 (Note: Administration and Probate Act 1928 (19 Geo. V. No. 3632)) and Section Two of the Administration and Probate (War Service) Act 1940. (Note: Administration and Probate (War Service) Act 1940 (No. 4756))
	No. 4941	30 December 1942
An Act to apply a sum out of the Consolidated Revenue to the service of the year ending on the thirtieth day of June On e thousand nine hundred and forty-three and to appropriate the Supplies granted in this Session of Parliament.
Cattle and Swine Compensation Act 1942	No.	
Country Roads Board Fund Act 1942	No.	
Dietitians Registration Act 1942	No.	
Drysdale United Service Home Act 1942	No.	
Entertainments Tax (War-time Suspension) Act 1942	No.	
Execution of Trusts Act 1942	No.	
Farmers Protection (Amendment) Act 1942	No.	
Forests Act 1942	No.	
Freezing Works (Overdraft Guarantee) Act 1942	No.	
Grain Elevators Act 1942	No.	
Health (Patent Medicines) Act 1942	No.	
Hospitals and Charities Act 1942	No.	
Land Surveyors Act 1942	No.	
Land Tax (Exemptions) Act 1942	No.	
Land Tax Act 1942	No.	
Legal Profession Practice Act 1942	No.	
Loan Government (Loans and Debentures) Act 1942	No.	
Local Government (Building Regulations) Amendment Act 1942	No.	
Local Government (Street Construction) Act 1942	No.	
Melbourne and Metropolitan Board of Works (Contributions) Act 1942	No.	
Melbourne and Metropolitan Board of Works (Rates) Act 1942	No.	
Melbourne and Metropolitan Tramways (Reserve Funds) Act 1942	No.	
Melbourne Markets Act 1942	No.	
Milk and Dairy Supervision Act 1942	No.	
Miners' Phthisis (Treasury Allowances) Amendment Act 1942	No.	
Mines Act 1942	No.	
Motor Car (Amendment) Act 1942	No.	
Patriotic Funds Act 1942	No.	
Public Account Advances (Amendment) Act 1942	No.	
Public Trustee Act 1942	No.	
Railway Construction Trusts Liabilities Act 1942	No.	
Railway Loan Application Act 1942	No.	
Sewerage Rates Act 1942	No.	
Sheep Dipping Act 1942	No.	
Soil Conservation Act 1942	No.	
South Melbourne (Birrell-place) Land Act 1942	No.	
St. Vincent's Hospital Land Act 1942	No.	
Stamps (Increased Duty Continuance) Act 1942	No.	
State Forests Loan Application Act 1942	No.	
Student Teachers (War Service) Act 1942	No.	
Surplus Revenue Act 1942	No.	
Water Act 1942	No.	
Water Supply Loans Application Act 1942	No.	

== Sources ==
- "1942 Victorian Historical Acts". AustLII.
