= List of acts of the Parliament of Victoria from 1873 =

This is a list of acts of the Parliament of Victoria, Australia for the year 1873.

== 1873 ==
Continuing the second session of the seventh parliament of Victoria.

Short title, or popular name	Citation	Royal assent
Long title
	36 Vict. No. 453	13 June 1873 (Note: This act was reserved for approval by Her Majesty.)
An Act to make valid the Marriage of a Man with the Sister of his Deceased Wife. (Repealed by Marriage Act 1890 (54 Vict. No. 1156))
	36 Vict. No. 454	13 June 1873
An Act to amend an Act intituled "An Act to enable the Bishops Clergy and Laity of the United Church of England and Ireland in Victoria to provide for the regulation of the affairs of the said Church." (Note: Church of England Act 1854 (18 Vict. No. 45))

The third session of the seventh parliament of Victoria.

Short title, or popular name	Citation	Royal assent
Long title
Post Office Amendment Act 1873 (repealed)	37 Vict. No. 455	25 June 1873
An Act to amend "The Post Office Statute 1866." (Note: Post Office Statute 1866 (29 Vict. No. 298)) (Repealed by Post Office Act 1883 (47 Vict. No. 781))
	37 Vict. No. 456	25 June 1873
An Act to apply out of the Consolidated Revenue the sum of Sixty-five thousand one hundred and forty-four pounds eight shillings and one penny to the service of the year One thousand eight hundred and seventy-two and three, and the sum of One million pounds to the service of the year One thousand eight hundred and seventy-three and four.
	37 Vict. No. 457	16 September 1873
An Act to enable the Governor in Council to Prohibit the Importation of Diseased Grape-vines and Grape-vine Cuttings. (Repealed by Phylloxera Vine Disease Act 1880 (44 Vict. No. 684))
Bank Holidays Act 1873 (repealed)	37 Vict. No. 458	16 September 1873
An Act to amend "The Instruments and Securities Statute 1864," (Note: Instruments and Securities Statute 1864 (27 Vict. No. 204)) and to provide for constituting certain days Bank Holidays. (Repealed by Banks and Currency Act 1890 (54 Vict. No. 1164))
	37 Vict. No. 459	16 September 1873
An Act to sanction the issue and expenditure of certain sums from "The Public Works Loan Account 1872" for Salaries, Wages, and Contingencies for the service of the year ending the thirtieth day of June One thousand eight hundred and seventy-four.
	37 Vict. No. 460	16 September 1873
An Act to sanction the issue and application of certain Sums of Money from "The Railway Loan Account," for Salaries Wages and Contingencies for the Service of the year One thousand eight hundred and seventy-three and One thousand eight hundred and seventy-four.
	37 Vict. No. 461	16 September 1873
An Act to sanction the issue and application of certain sums of money from "The Railway Loan Liquidation and Construction Account," established under the provision of section forty-two of 33 Vict. No. 360. (Note: Land Act 1869 (33 Vict. No. 360))
	37 Vict. No. 462	16 September 1873
An Act to sanction the issue and expenditure of certain sums from "The Public Works Loan Account 1872" for Salaries Wages and Contingencies for the service of the year ending the Thirtieth day of June One thousand eight hundred and seventy-four.
Statute of Gaols Further Amendment Act 1873 (repealed)	37 Vict. No. 463	29 October 1873
An Act to further amend "The Statute of Gaols 1864." (Note: Statute of Gaols 1864 (27 Vict. No. 219)) (Repealed by Gaols Act 1890 (54 Vict. No. 1096))
Game Act Amendment Act 1873 (repealed)	37 Vict. No. 464	29 October 1873
An Act to further amend an Act intituled "An Act to Protect Game" (Note: Game Act 1867 (31 Vict. No. 311)) and to repeal the Act No. 438. (Note: Amended Game Act 1872 (36 Vict. No. 438)) (Repealed by Game Act 1890 (54 Vict. No. 1095))
South Melbourne Gas Company's Extension of Powers Act 1873	37 Vict. No. 465	11 November 1873
An Act to enable the South Melbourne Gas Company to extend the provisions of "The South Melbourne Gas Company's Act 1872" (Note: South Melbourne Gas Company's Act 1872 (36 Vict. No. 426)) and to confer on the said Company additional powers and for other purposes.
Supervision of Workrooms and Factories Statute 1873 (repealed)	37 Vict. No. 466	11 November 1873
An Act for the supervision and regulation of Workrooms and Factories and the Employment of Females therein. (Repealed by Factories and Shops Act 1885 (49 Vict. No. 862))
	37 Vict. No. 467	11 November 1873
An Act to sanction the issue and application of certain sums of money from "The Railway Loan Liquidation and Construction Account," established under the provision of section forty-two of 33 Vict. No. 360.
Railway Loan Act 1873	37 Vict. No. 468	11 November 1873
An Act to authorize the raising of Money for Railways and for other purposes.
	37 Vict. No. 469	11 November 1873
An Act to continue an expiring law.
	37 Vict. No. 470	11 November 1873
An Act to continue for One Year the Endowment of certain Shires. (Repealed by Local Government Act 1874 (38 Vict. No. 506)
Western Port Coal Mining Company's Act Amendment Act 1873	37 Vict. No. 471	11 November 1873
An Act to amend and continue an Act intituled "An Act to authorize the Western Port Coal Mining Company Limited to construct a Tramway or Railway, and to take and purchase certain Lands for that purpose." (Note: Western Port Coal Mining Company's Act 1871 (35 Vict. No. 410))
	37 Vict. No. 472	25 November 1873
An Act to apply a sum out of the Consolidated Revenue to the service of the year ending on the last day of June One thousand eight hundred and seventy-four, and to appropriate the Supplies granted in this Session of Parliament.
Fisheries Act 1873 (repealed)	37 Vict. No. 473	25 November 1873
An Act to amend the Law relating to Fisheries. (Repealed by Fisheries Act 1890 (54 Vict. No. 1093))
Life Assurance Companies Act 1873 (repealed)	37 Vict. No. 474	25 November 1873
An Act to amend the Law relating to Life Assurance Companies. (Repealed by Companies Act 1890 (54 Vict. No. 1074))
Railway Construction Act 1873	37 Vict. No. 475	25 November 1873
An Act to authorize the Construction of certain Lines of Railway by the State.
Police Regulation Statute 1873	37 Vict. No. 476	25 November 1873
An'Act to amend the Law relating to the Police Force in Victoria.
Industrial and Provident Societies Act 1873 (repealed)	37 Vict. No. 477	25 November 1873
An Act to legalize the formation of "Industrial and Provident Societies." (Repealed by Provident Societies Act 1890 (54 Vict. No. 1131))
Pounds Act 1874 (Note: Although given a short title ending '...Act 1874' this act was passed in the year 1873.) (repealed)	37 Vict. No. 478	25 November 1873
An Act to amend the Law relating to the Impounding of Cattle. (Repealed by Pounds Act 1890 (54 Vict. No. 1129))
Fences Statute 1874 (repealed)	37 Vict. No. 479	25 November 1873
An Act to amend the Law relating to Dividing Fences. (Repealed by Fences Act 1890 (54 Vict. No. 1092))
Regulation of Mines Statute 1873 (repealed)	37 Vict. No. 480	25 November 1873
An Act to provide for the regulation and inspection of Mines. (Repealed by Regulation of Mines Statute 1877 (41 Vict. No. 583))

== Sources ==
- "1873 Victorian Historical Acts". AustLII.
