= List of acts of the Parliament of Victoria from 1926 =

This is a list of acts of the Parliament of Victoria, Australia for the year 1926.

== 1926 ==
Short title, or popular name	Citation	Royal assent
Long title
	17 Geo. V. No. 3442	7 July 1926
An Act to apply out of the Consolidated Revenue the sum of One million four hundred and seventy thousand five hundred and seventeen pounds to the service of the year One thousand nine hundred and twenty-six and One thousand nine hundred and twenty-seven.
	17 Geo. V. No. 3443	29 July 1926
An Act to apply out of the Consolidated Revenue the sum of Five hundred and thirty thousand seven hundred and eighty-three pounds to the service of the year One thousand nine hundred and twenty-five and One thousand nine hundred and twenty-six.
	17 Geo. V. No. 3444	5 August 1926
An Act to apply out of the Consolidated Revenue the sum of One million four hundred and ten thousand two hundred and two pounds to the service of the year One thousand nine hundred and twenty-six and One thousand nine hundred and twenty-seven.
	17 Geo. V. No. 3445	1 September 1926
An Act to apply out of the Consolidated Revenue the sum of One million four hundred and eighty-four thousand three hundred and ninety-five pounds to the service of the year One thousand nine hundred and twenty-six and One thousand nine hundred and twenty-seven.
	17 Geo. V. No. 3449	30 September 1926
An Act to apply out of the Consolidated Revenue the sum of One million six hundred and thirty-four thousand eight hundred and forty pounds to the service of the year One thousand nine hundred and twenty-six and One thousand nine hundred and twenty-seven.
Administration and Probate Act 1926 (repealed)	17 Geo. V. No. 3450	5 October 1926
An Act to amend the Administration and Probate Act 1915 (Note: Administration and Probate Act 1915 (6 Geo. V. No. 2611)) and for other purposes. (Repealed by Administration and Probate Act 1928 (19 Geo. V. No. 3632))
	17 Geo. V. No. 3452	8 November 1926
An Act to apply out of the Consolidated Revenue the sum of One million four hundred and seventy-two thousand seven hundred and forty-seven pounds to the service of the year One thousand nine hundred and twenty-six and One thousand nine hundred and twenty-seven.
Bank of New South Wales Act 1926 (repealed)	17 Geo. V. No. 3453	11 November 1926
An Act relating to the Corporation known as the Bank of New South Wales. (Repealed by Legislation Reform (Repeals No. 3) Act 2008 (No. 53 of 2008))
	17 Geo. V. No. 3460	9 December 1926
An Act to apply out of the Consolidated Revenue the sum of One million five hundred and forty-nine thousand three hundred and thirty-three pounds to the service of the year One thousand nine hundred and twenty-six and One thousand nine hundred and twenty-seven.
Dried Fruits Act 1926 (repealed)	17 Geo. V. No. 3461	14 December 1926
An Act to continue the Operation of the Dried Fruits Acts. (Repealed by Dried Fruits Act 1928 (19 Geo. V. No. 3670))
South Kensington to West Footscray Railway Construction Act 1926	17 Geo. V. No. 3464	21 December 1926
An Act to authorize the Construction by the State of a Line of Railway from South Kensington to West Footscray.
Ballaarat Gas Company's Act 1926 (repealed)	17 Geo. V. No. 3483	23 December 1926
An Act to amend The Ballaarat Gas Company's Act 1857. (Note: Ballaarat Gas Company's Act 1857 (21 Vict. No. 27)) (Repealed by Statute Law Revision Act 1995 (No. 11 of 1995))
Ararat Land Act 1926	17 Geo. V. No. 3484	23 December 1926
An Act to revoke the Reservation of certain Land situate in the Township of Ararat as a Site for the Interment of the Dead and for other purposes.
Sinking Funds and Redemption Funds Act 1926 (repealed)	17 Geo. V. No. 3491	23 December 1926
An Act to make provision with respect to certain Sinking Funds and Redemption Funds and for other purposes. (Repealed by Statute Law Revision Act 1995 (No. 11 of 1995))
Black Rock to Beaumaris Electric Street Railway Act 1926	17 Geo. V. No. 3492	23 December 1926
An Act to further amend the Black Rock to Beaumaris Electric Street Railway Act 1920. (Note: Black Rock to Beaumaris Electric Street Railway Act 1920 (11 Geo. V. No. 3110))
Albion to Broadmeadows Railway Construction Act 1926	17 Geo. V. No. 3493	23 December 1926
An Act to authorize the Construction by (he State of a Line of Railway from Albion to Broadmeadows.
Orbost to Brodribb Railway Construction Act 1926	17 Geo. V. No. 3494	23 December 1926
An Act to authorize the Construction by the State of a Line of Railway from Orbost to Brodribb.
Constitution Act Amendment Act 1926	17 Geo. V. No. 3498	23 December 1926
An Act to amend The Constitution Act Amendment Acts.
	17 Geo. V. No. 3499	23 December 1926
An Act to apply a sum out of the Consolidated Revenue to the service of the year ending on the thirtieth day of June One thousand nine hundred and twenty-seven and to appropriate the Supplies granted in this Session of Parliament.
Darling to Glen Waverley Railway Construction Act 1926	17 Geo. V. No. 3500	23 December 1926
An Act to authorize the Construction by the State of a Line of Railway from Darling to Glen Waverley.
Castlemaine Land Act 1926	17 Geo. V. No.	
Cattle Compensation Act 1926	17 Geo. V. No.	
Censorship of Films Act 1926	17 Geo. V. No.	
Children's Welfare Act 1926	17 Geo. V. No.	
Companies (Names) Act 1926	17 Geo. V. No.	
Compulsory Voting (Assembly Elections) Act 1926	17 Geo. V. No.	
Country Roads Act 1926	17 Geo. V. No.	
Electoral Districts Act 1926	17 Geo. V. No.	
Federal Aid Roads Act 1926	17 Geo. V. No.	
Fruit Act 1926	17 Geo. V. No.	
Fyansford Land Act 1926	17 Geo. V. No.	
Geelong Waterworks and Sewerage Act 1926	17 Geo. V. No.	
Health Act 1926	17 Geo. V. No.	
Highways and Vehicles Act 1926	17 Geo. V. No.	
Income Tax Act 1926	17 Geo. V. No.	
Income Tax Acts Amendment Act 1926	17 Geo. V. No.	
Land Tax Act 192	17 Geo. V. No.	
Melbourne and Geelong Lighting Rate Act 1926	17 Geo. V. No.	
Melbourne and Metropolitan Tramways Act 1926	17 Geo. V. No.	
Melbourne Harbor Trust Act 1926	17 Geo. V. No.	
Metropolitan Drainage and Rivers Act 1926	17 Geo. V. No.	
Municipal Endowment Act 1926	17 Geo. V. No.	
Newport Land Act 1926	17 Geo. V. No.	
Public Works Loan Application Act 1926	17 Geo. V. No.	
Railway Loan Application Act 1926	17 Geo. V. No.	
Saturday Voting (Parliamentary Elections) Act 1926	17 Geo. V. No.	
Settled Estates and Settled Lands Act 1926	17 Geo. V. No.	
Stamps Act 1926	17 Geo. V. No.	
Stock Foods Act 1926	17 Geo. V. No.	
Teachers Act 1926	17 Geo. V. No.	
Theatres Act 1926	17 Geo. V. No.	
Treasury Bills and Advances Act 1926	17 Geo. V. No.	
Treasury Bonds Act 1926	17 Geo. V. No.	
Victorian Government Loan Act 1926	17 Geo. V. No.	
Victorian Loan (Electricity Supply) and Application Act 1926	17 Geo. V. No.	
Victorian Loan (Public Works) Act 1926	17 Geo. V. No.	
Victorian Loan Act 1926	17 Geo. V. No.	
Water Supply Loans Application Act 1926	17 Geo. V. No.	
Women's Qualification Act 1926	17 Geo. V. No.	
Wycheproof Land Act 1926	17 Geo. V. No.	

== Sources ==
- "1926 Victorian Historical Acts". AustLII.
