= Else Shepherd =

South African-Australian engineer and academic (1944–2023)

Else Shepherd AM (born Else Egede Budtz-Olsen; 1944–2023), was a South African-Australian engineer and academic, the first woman to graduate with an electrical engineering degree in Queensland.

== Early life ==
Shepherd was born in Durban, South Africa in 1944, the daughter of Professor Otto Budtz-Olsen and his wife Molly. The family emigrated to Australia in 1956 where her father was employed as a lecturer in physiology at the University of Queensland. Her mother became Principal of the Women’s College at the University of Queensland in 1963. Budtz-Olsen attended Brisbane Girls Grammar School where she excelled in maths and physics. Inspired by the launch of the Russian satellite Sputnik in 1957 she enrolled in engineering at the University of Queensland in 1962, graduating with a degree in electrical engineering in 1965. Budtz-Olsen married and she joined her husband in Mackay where she worked at the Sugar Research Institute. Else Shepherd worked as an operation research engineer while raising their two children. She also taught classes at Mackay TAFE.

== Career ==
Shepherd and her family returned to Brisbane in 1983 and she formed the company Mosaic Information Technology which designed and manufactured telecommunications products and modems from 1986. A new company, Microwave and Materials Designs was formed in 2002, developing microwave filters for mobile phones.

Shepherd was appointed Chair of Powerlink in 1994. She sat on the board of the National Electricity Market Management Company, the Brisbane City Works Advisory Board and the International Electrotechnical Commission Council Board. She lectured at the University of Queensland, Queensland University of Technology and Griffith University.

Shepherd was a trained pianist who received her Graduate Diploma in Music from the Queensland Conservatorium in 1984. She worked as a choral conductor and director of arts organisations.

== Awards ==
- Member of the Order of Australia (General Division) (2003) - For service to the engineering profession, particularly electrical and electronic engineering, to education, to the electricity distribution industry, and to the community.
- University of Queensland Alumnus of the Year 2009
- Peter Nicol Russell Memorial Medal, 2007

== Commemoration ==
- A tunnel boring machine used in Queensland is named after her.
