= Smith St. Hotel =

Music venue in Melbourne

Smith St Hotel
- Interactive map of Smith St Hotel
- Former names: The Gasometer Hotel, Irish Murphy's, Father Flanagan's Hotel
- Address: 484 Smith Street, Collingwood
- Location: Collingwood, Melbourne, Victoria, Australia
- Coordinates: 37.7942363122859°S 144.98532418434914°E
- Type: Music venue
- Events: Independent music Punk

Construction
- Built: 1860s
- Opened: 1861 (as the Gasometer); 2026 (as the Smith St Hotel)

Website
- smithsthotel.com.au

The Smith St Hotel is a live music venue and pub located in Collingwood, Victoria. It opened in 1861 adjacent to the Fitzroy Gasworks as the Gasometer Hotel, known colloquially as The Gaso. Over its history, it has served as a hub for local musicians. Throughout the late 20th and 21st century, it went through several changes in ownership before closing most recently in February 2025. It reopened with its current name on 24 July 2026.

The building is a two storeyed stuccoed stone hotel on Smith Street, with a single storey section facing Alexandra Parade. In 2014, its yellow and black exterior was painted red.

== History ==
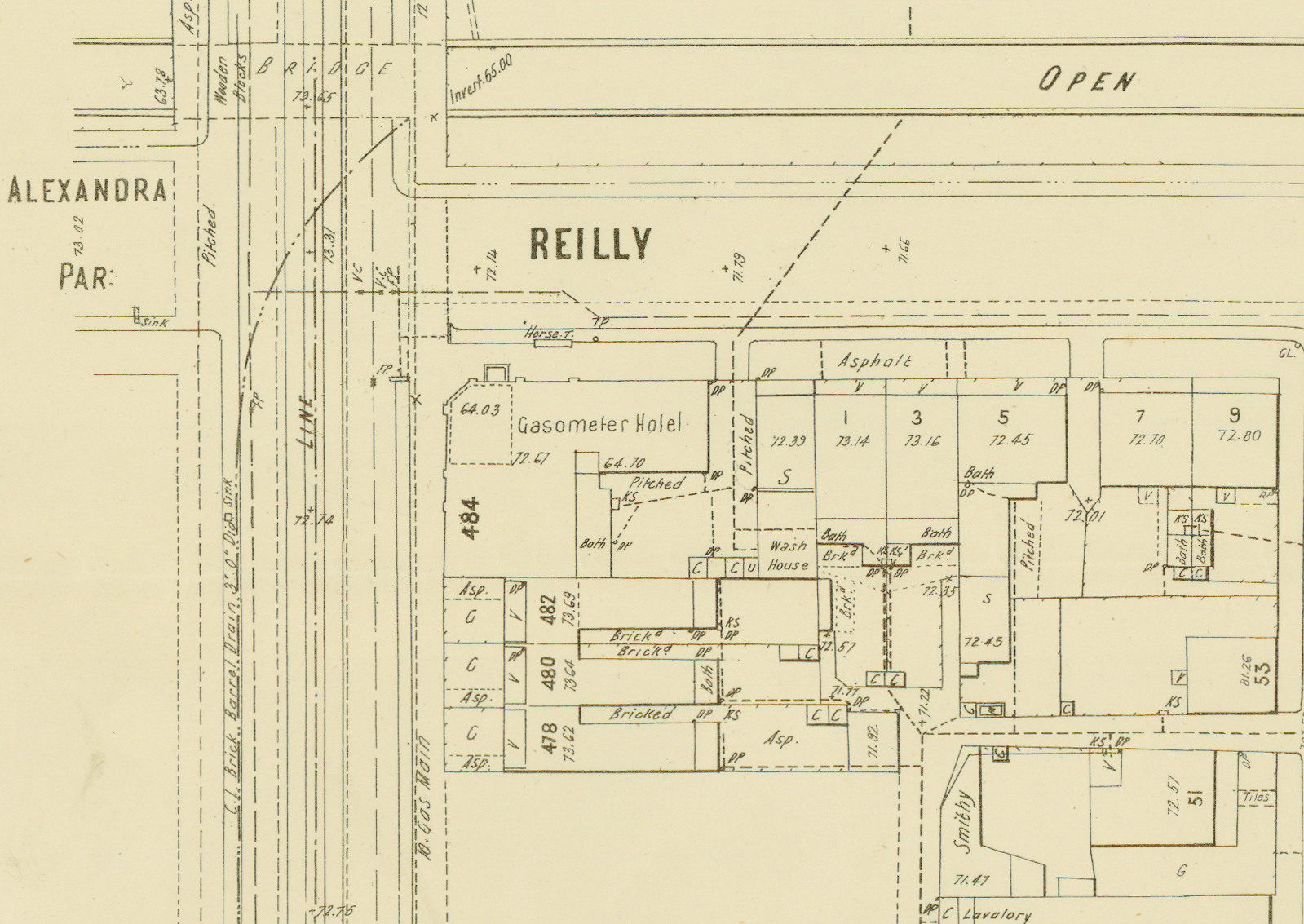
City of Collingwood plan showing Gasometer Hotel, 1900

The Smith St Hotel first opened in 1861 as the Gasometer Hotel, in reference to the nearby Fitzroy Gasworks—operating for 136 years under that name. Throughout its history, it was known as a venue for local live music, hosting many independent acts. as well as bigger bands such as Jet, Paul Dempsey, and the Saints.

In the late 20th and 21st century, the venue would go through a series of changes; first being rebranded to Irish Murphy's in 1997, and Father Flanagan's Hotel in 2010. The leasehold was bought in 2010 by Paul and Egilberto Martin and Kody Abrams, who would declare they were, "stripping back the Irish crap and renaming it the Gasometer."

=== 2013 Closure ===
In November 2013, the pub was shut down suddenly after repeatedly failing to pay a debt owned to McLaren Vale Beer Company. The closure was only announced with a hand written note on the door read, "‘Unfortunately Gaso is in limbo! Sorry for any inconvenience." Shannon Vanderwert and Clint Fisher would once again reopen the Gasometer Hotel in April 2014. In 2021, the pair transferred ownership to software engineer James Martelletti, stating that the sale was not related to the COVID-19 pandemic.

=== 2025 Closure ===
On March 21, 2025, the Gasometer Hotel once again closed, with owner James Martelletti stating that the "economics of live music just don’t really make sense any more". Restaurateur Scott Pickett took over the leasehold for the venue, reopening it as the Smith St Hotel on July 24, 2026. There was concern that the site would be converted into apartments, or would not continue as a venue for gigs. Pickett would clarify: "Are we a gastro pub? Fuck no."

The reopening was welcomed by members of the Australian music sector, including Music Victoria CEO and PBS's General Manager, as well as City of Yarra mayor Stephen Jolly, who said "there will be a lot of relief in the area that we will not lose another live music venue."

== See also ==
- Music of Melbourne
- The Tote Hotel
