= Brian Harper (engineer) =

Australian civil engineer and academic

- Born: Melbourne, Australia
- Citizenship: Australia
- Education: University of Melbourne, Melbourne, Victoria
- Engineering career
- Discipline: engineer
- Institutions: University of Melbourne Fellow School of Social and Environmental Enquiry

Brian Harper (BE Syd. MSc Qu. PhD Melb.) is a civil engineer and lecturer practicing in Melbourne, Australia who has contributed to documenting the history of engineering in Australia.

== Engineering career ==
Harper trained as a civil engineer and town planner, graduating in civil engineering at Sydney University and completing post graduate studies in transport and traffic engineering in Canada. He spent much of his professional years working in the area of transportation, traffic and regional planning, in state, commonwealth and local government authorities. He was CEO of the City of Doncaster and Templestowe in the 1980s.

Harper is a Fellow of the Institution of Engineers Australia and member of the Engineering Heritage Australia Committee, Institute of Engineers Australia, Victoria Division, and a Fellow School of Social and Environmental Enquiry at the University of Melbourne. He sat on the Public Transportation Commission Technical Committee in 2007–8, helping steer the development of improvements to networking Melbourne's train systems.

== Research ==
He later retired from professional practice and pursued his interest in the history of civil engineering. He also studied under Roderick Weir Home, Professor of History and Philosophy of Science at the University of Melbourne. Harper became a member of the National Trust expert historic bridges committee in 2000, continuing on the committee up to its folding in 2012. He has been active in nominating National Engineering Landmarks and also became a member of the exclusive Wallaby Club in 2008.

His research has looked into the development of civil engineering during the 19th century, in Britain and in Victoria and links between engineers training in Britain and working on railway and water supply in Victoria, Australia. In particular he has focused his research and publications on the Gold Fields Railways, and the design of the iron bridges on the Bendigo and Ballarat railway lines.

== Research & publications ==
- Craft to Applied Science: The Institution of Civil Engineers
- The chalk-water controversy in early Victorian London
- Edward Dobson and the Mass Concrete Gravity Dam on Stony Creek for the Geelong Water Supply
- The True History of the Design of the Melbourne, Mt Alexander and Murray River Railway.
- Early Iron Bridges on the Bendigo Railway
- The Victorian Gold Fields Water Supply Scheme of 1862
