= Geelong Power Station =

Coordinates: 38°8′46″S 144°21′49″E

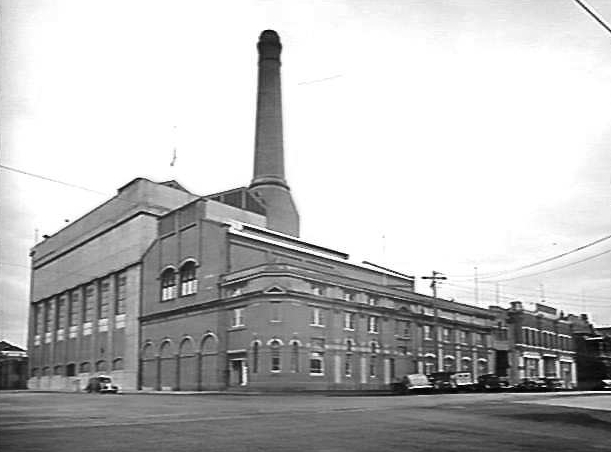
Geelong A power station, 1948

The city of Geelong, Victoria, Australia, was once home to two coal-fired power stations - Geelong A and Geelong B.

The first moves to provide an electricity supply to Geelong were made in 1898, with three separate companies vying for the right to operate in the city. Two of these companies merged to form the Electric Lighting and Traction Company of Australia, which built the Geelong A power station.

The company was later taken over by the Melbourne Electric Supply Company, which remained the supplier of electricity to Geelong until 1 September 1930, when the company was purchased by the State Electricity Commission of Victoria. In 1936, Geelong was connected to the state electrical grid and, by the 1960s, Geelong A had closed. Geelong B remained for a few more years, being used for peak loads only, but closed in 1970 due to the much higher efficiency of new power stations in Victoria's Latrobe Valley.

== Geelong A ==
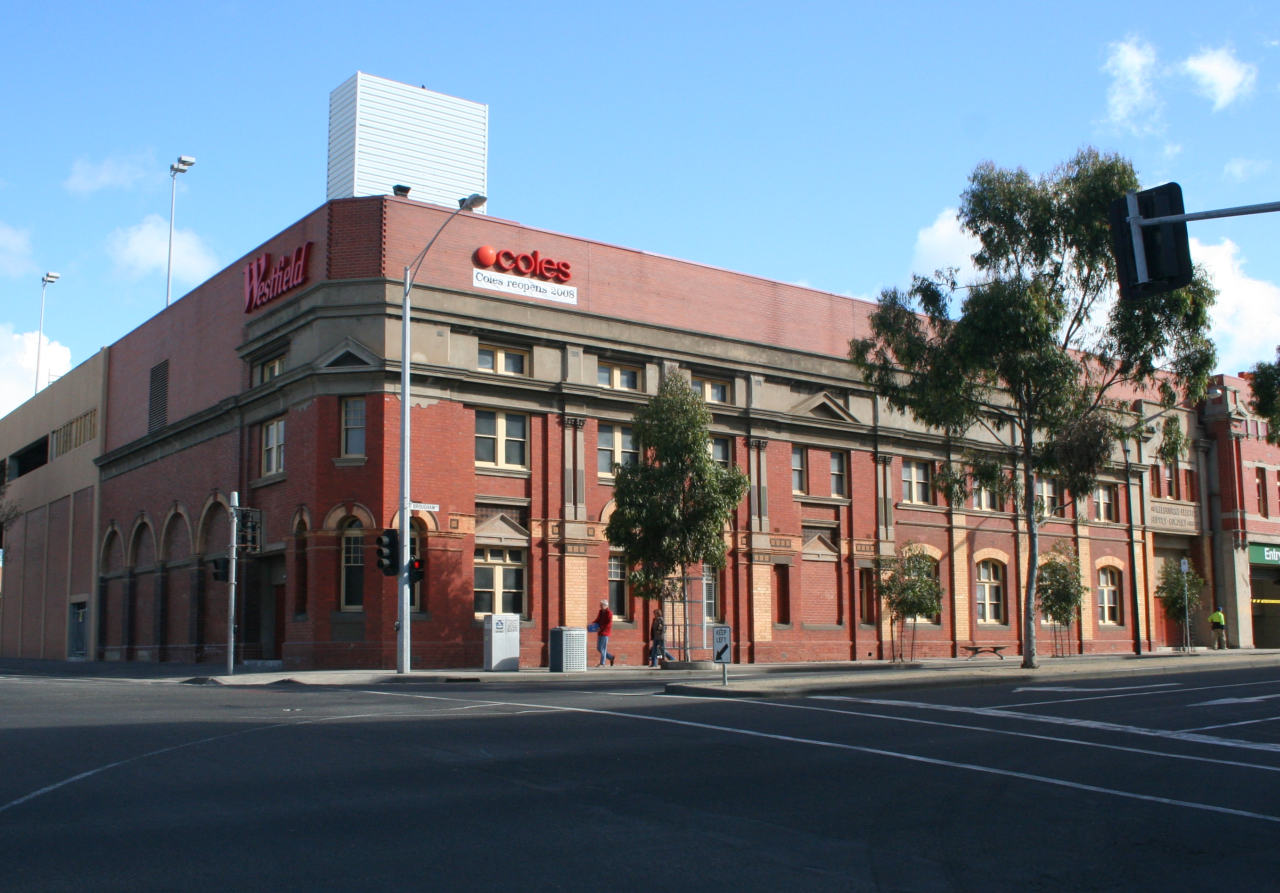
Facade of the former Geelong A power station, now part of Westfield Bay City

The Geelong A power station was on the corner of Yarra and Brougham Streets in the city. It was erected by the Electric Lighting and Traction Company of Australia, with the foundation stone laid in March 1900. On 4 June 1900, the first power pole was erected in Geelong, on the corner of McKillop and Yarra Streets, opposite the Jewish Synagogue. The work was completed by May 1901 and, on 3 May, a ceremony was held to switch on the supply of electricity to Geelong.

=== Design ===
The power station originally had a capacity of 200 kilowatts (kW), and supplied electricity at 440/220 volts DC. Equipment at the station consisted of:

- two 100 kW Belliss-Brush steam dynamos
- two boilers of dry back return tube type, operating at 120 psi (830 kPa) steam pressure, with Green's economisers also fitted
- 120-foot (37 m)-high brick chimney
- 800 ampere hour secondary battery for lamps in the station.

Condensing water for the boilers was pumped from Corio Bay by electric pump via a cast iron rising main. The power station was only used in daylight hours, with the town's electricity being provided by batteries at night.

In 1920, the original equipment was scrapped, and a three-phase 6000 volt, 50 cycle (Hertz) AC system was installed, having a total generating capacity of 10,500 kilowatts (10.5 MW). The new works included:

- six John Thompson water tube boilers, with a 4,557 sq ft (423.4 m^{2}) of heating surface, and 200 psi gauge pressure.
- four Erith-Riley multiple retort stokers, and two Underfeed company chain grate stokers, set up in batteries of two.
- one 1,500 kW Brush-Ljungstrom turbo-alternator, and three further sets of Metropolitan-Vickers 3000 kW alternators.
- an additional floor in the administration block.
- a new water tunnel to Corio Bay.

Three Peebles-La-Cour rotary converters of 500 kilowatt capacity were also installed to supply DC current for the Geelong tramways and older DC equipment in the central city. The fuel used was black coal from Newcastle that was brought from fuel storage yards some distance away. The station was converted to burn brown coal briquettes in 1931, with the stokers to the boiler replaced by locally produced ones of overfeed design. The use of black coal had been phased out by 1937.

After 1930, ownership the station was transferred to the State Electricity Commission of Victoria (SECV), and was operated with one generator set out of service, giving a useful capacity of 7500 kilowatts, and an overload capacity of 9375 kilowatts. The Geelong Harbour Trust had been responsible for the supply of electricity to the port of Geelong, but that responsibility was acquired by the SECV from midnight 13 June 1938.

=== Closure ===
The rotary converters ceased functioning on 17 July 1961, resulting in the supply of DC current being terminated. That also marked the end of Geelong A as a generating unit. However, the plant was retained until 1967 The sale of equipment was carried out in 1966–67, and dismantling and removal was planned to take seven or eight months.

Sale of the building was dependent on the SECV Distribution Depot being moved to North Geelong, the conversion of older 6.6 kV feeders to a more modern 22 kV system, and the removal of the 6.6 kV switching structure and capacitor banks at old station. On 11 June 1970, the building was sold at auction for $45,000, to Mr I. Watson, acting on behalf of unknown company.

Throughout the 1980s, development plans were floated for the site, but nothing was done until the Bay City Plaza shopping centre was built on the site. The façade of the administration block was retained as part of the shopping centre.

== Geelong B ==
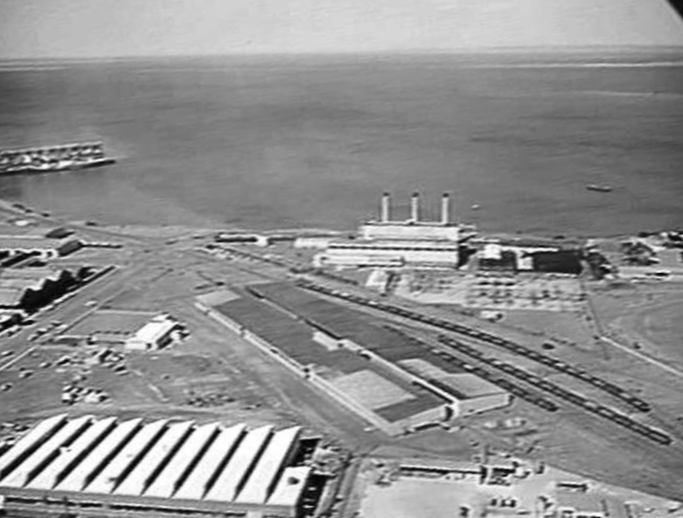
Geelong B power station from the west, looking over Corio Bay

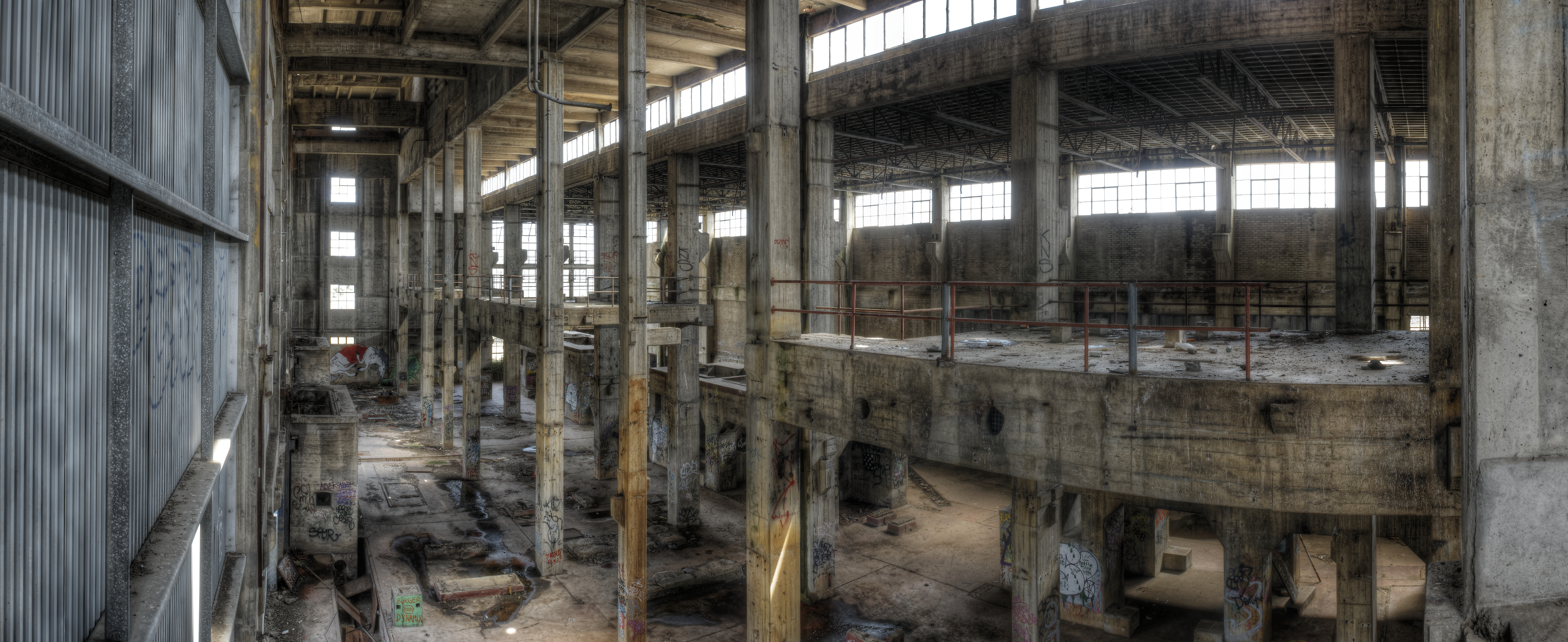
Geelong B power station, 2011

The Geelong B power station had a generating capacity of 30,000 kilowatts (30 MW) and was located at North Geelong, on the edge of Corio Bay. It was also the largest power station in Victoria outside the Latrobe Valley. The plant was officially opened on 8 October 1954 by the Honourable J.W. Galbally, MLC, Minister in Charge of Electrical Undertakings.

Geelong B was a "packaged" station, using components imported from the United States of America, and was erected under contract for the SECV. The contract included the supply and erection of buildings, boilers, generators, transformers, switchgear and coal handling equipment, and putting the station into service.

The power station was of unusual design, having no conventional boiler house, the boilers being out of doors except for the boiler operating face, which helped to reduce building costs. Each of the three boilers was connected to a generator of 10,000 kW capacity. Cooling water for the power station was drawn from Corio Bay, and most of the power generated was used by local industry.

The boilers were automatically controlled, and produced 110,000 pounds of steam per hour (49,900 kg/h) at 625 psi (4.31 MPa). Fuel was moved by belt bucket and scraper conveyors to the fuel bunkers, then delivered to the boilers by mechanical spreader stokers.

The fuel used was brown coal, purchased by the SECV from the Wensley Brae open cut mine, just west of Wensleydale but, from 1960, better-quality coal was purchased from a mine at Anglesea instead. The Anglesea coal seam was later used to fuel the adjacent Anglesea Power Station that opened in 1969 and closed in 2015. A third change in fuel supplied occurred soon after, with the boilers being converted to use briquettes brought to Geelong by rail from Yallourn.

By the 1960s, the power station was only used to meet peak loads due to its high operating cost, and the station was closed in 1970 when newer power stations opened in the Latrobe Valley.

The powerhouse still stands today and, in 2014, was the site of an arts project, curated by Ian Ballis, that decorated the once-derelict building with many of pieces of art. It was opened to the public at the time. Rone was one artist who participated.
