= Fitzroy Gasworks =

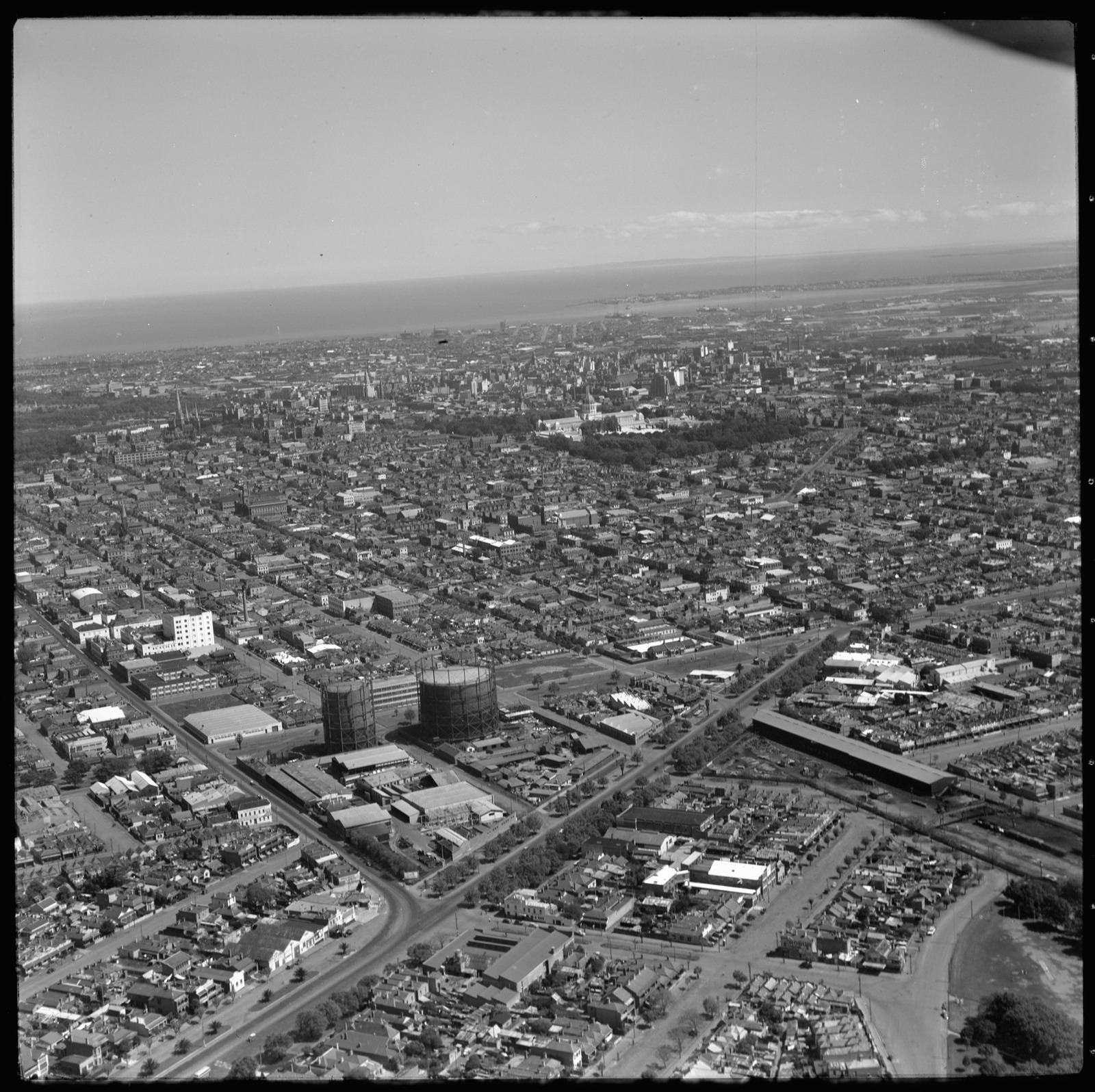
- Aerial photograph of Fitzroy and Collingwood, with the Gasworks in the foreground
- Interactive map of Fitzroy Gasworks
- 37.7926°S 144.9846°E

History
- Built: 1861
- Demolished: 1978

The Fitzroy Gasworks was a coal gasification plant in Fitzroy, Victoria. It was constructed in 1861 and demolished in 1978. It is notable as the site for the first arc-welded gasholder in the world.

== History ==
In 1856 the first gas supply had been instigated in Melbourne, Australia, with the construction of the West Melbourne Gasworks. In the same year, residents of the Fitzroy Ward of the Corporation of Melbourne met at Clarke's Hotel, Smith Street, for the purpose of considering on the best means of obtaining a supply of gas within the ward. Public concern that the City of Melbourne Gas and Coke Company monopoly resulted in excessive price for gas led to the establishment of several local gas companies, the first of which was the Collingwood, Victoria and District Gas and Coke Company formed in 1859. The company supplied gas to an area within a six mile radius of the works, which were erected on Reilly Street (now Alexandra Parade), North Fitzroy in 1861.

The original part of the works was on the north side of Alexandra Parade and West of Smith Street, was designed by engineer William Elsdon. The works was extended across Gore Street to the west as far as George Street. Opposite the works was the Gasometer Hotel.

The company amalgamated with the Melbourne and South Melbourne companies in 1878 to form the Metropolitan Gas Company, and the gasworks were known as the Fitzroy Station. The Fitzroy works was not as profitable as the other Metropolitan company's plants as so gas production was gradually reduced, and the site redeveloped to accommodate the company's construction workshops and gas storage. The only riveted gasholder erected by the Metropolitan Gas Company was built at Fitzroy in 1919. The Chief engineer Joseph Newell Reeson undertook a number of experiments with gas manufacture, including the application of electric arc welding to fabrication of large structures, and was responsible for the first arc welded large steel structure in the world, the No 3 gasholder, completed in 1923. This was dismantled in 1978, and the site covered over, but buried remains may still be present.

== Surviving features ==
While much of the site has been demolished and modern workshop and store buildings erected, there are a number of historic features. The former valve house is located on the corner of Alexandra Parade and George Street, and while a Porter prefabricated iron building is located on the northern edge of the site. A further building remaining from the gasworks is a bichrome brick store which was identified in heritage studies but has not been included on heritage registers.
