= State Electricity Commission of Victoria =

Government electricity supplier in Victoria, Australia

- Type: State Owned Enterprise
- Industry: Electricity
- Founded: 1918; 108 years ago
- Headquarters: Melbourne, Victoria
- Area served: Victoria
- Key people: Simon Corbell (Chairman); Chris Miller (CEO)
- Website: secvictoria.com.au

The State Electricity Commission of Victoria (SEC, SECV or ECV) is a government-owned electricity company in Victoria, Australia. Originally established to generate electricity from the state's reserves of brown coal, the SEC gradually monopolised most aspects of the Victorian electricity industry, before being broken up and largely privatised in the 1990s. After several decades of dormancy, it was revived in 2023 to invest in renewable energy and storage markets.

A 1918 act of the Victorian Parliament appointed a board of Electricity Commissioners to investigate the feasibility of exploiting the substantial brown coal deposits in the Latrobe Valley. The Commissioners, soon renamed the SEC, constructed the first of many power stations at Yallourn, entered the distribution and retailing businesses, and gained regulatory powers over the electricity industry. By the 1970s, the SEC held a virtual monopoly over the entire Victorian electricity system. Beginning in the early 1990s, the SEC's businesses and assets were broken up and privatised, while its regulatory functions were taken over by other government agencies. A shell entity remained to administer residual assets and liabilities, and to manage a small number of government-subsidised power contracts.

During the 2022 state election campaign, the Victorian Labor Party led by Daniel Andrews pledged to revive the SEC as a participant in the deregulated National Electricity Market. Following Labor's victory at the election, an initial $1 billion investment was allocated in the 2023–24 state budget to new state-owned company SEC Victoria. A series of legislative reforms passed in 2024 entrenched a mandate in the Victorian Constitution for the new SEC to act as a renewable energy provider, and restricts its abolition or privatisation without a special majority of the Parliament.

== Background ==
SECV shield as used from formation until the 1970s

When electricity generation first became practical, the main uses were lighting of public buildings, street lighting and later, electric trams. As a result, electricity generation and distribution tended to be carried out by municipalities, by private companies under franchise to the councils, or by joint private-public bodies.

Prior to the establishment of SECV, electricity was generated and distributed by a number of private and municipal generator and distribution companies. The main municipal-owned power station in Victoria was opened in 1892 by the Melbourne City Council, which generated electricity from its Spencer Street Power Station for the city's residents, as well as being a wholesale supplier to other municipal distributors. The main privately owned company was the Melbourne Electric Supply Company which was established in 1899 and operated under 30-year franchise arrangement with a number of other municipal distributors. The company operated the Richmond and Geelong power stations. The final major generator of electricity was the Victorian Railways which operated the Newport Power Station, for the supply of electricity to Melbourne's suburban trains. These early generators all relied on a fuel supply provided by the strike prone black coal industry of New South Wales.

Victoria has large reserves of brown coal located in the Latrobe Valley, to the east of Melbourne. Brown coal has a low energy density due to the high moisture content and would have been uneconomic to transport to Melbourne. However, advances in electrical transmission technology allowed electricity to be generated near the fuel source and transmitted to the consumer.

== Vertically integrated utility (1918–1994) ==
=== Formation ===
Following an overseas tour in 1911, Herbert Reah Harper, engineer with the Melbourne City Council Electricity Supply Department, recognised the potential for Victorian brown coal, after seeing Germany's use, and recommended the establishment of a public utility on the lines of the Ontario Hydro Electricity. He was subsequently appointed to the Victorian Government Brown Coal Advisory Committee (chaired by Department of Mines director Hyman Herman), which reported in September 1917. It recommended the establishment of an Electricity Commission to develop the brown coal reserves, construct a power station and transmission lines. In December 1918, Parliament passed a bill to establish a Commission with both regulatory and investigative powers, including taking over the enforcement of the existing Electric Light and Power Act, which regulated all electricity generators and distributors.

The Victorian Electricity Commissioners were created in 1919 under the Electricity Commissioners Act 1918 and took over administration of the Electric Light and Power Act from the Public Works Department.

Sugarloaf Power Station, part of the Rubicon Scheme

The Electricity Commissioners became the State Electricity Commission of Victoria (SECV) on 10 January 1921 under the State Electricity Commission Act 1920. Sir John Monash was both chairman and general manager and Harper was the first chief engineer, retiring in 1936.

=== Capital works ===
The first capital works to be carried out by the SECV was the development of the 50 MW Yallourn Power Station, briquette factory, and open-cut brown coal mine in the Latrobe Valley. The SECV was allocated $2.86 million for the Yallourn works, which had been recommended in 1917. Transmission of electricity to Melbourne began in 1924, a distance of 160 km using a 132 kV line. The SECV moved to 220 kV transmission in 1956 and 500 kV in 1970. The SECV built Newport 'B' Power Station in 1923 to supply electricity to Melbourne until the Yallourn power station entered service. Newport 'B' was fuelled by imported black coal and Yallourn briquettes.

Work on hydroelectric power commenced in 1922 on the Rubicon Hydroelectric Scheme to the north-east of Melbourne. For the first ten years of its operation it supplied on average 16.9% of electricity generated by the SECV. The Kiewa Hydroelectric Scheme was approved in 1937, but World War II delayed its progress.

=== Industry structure ===
The legislation also gave the SECV the authority to decide whether rival organisations could be set up in competition to it, as well as the authority to take over existing private companies when their franchises expired. By 1953 the SECV acquired control of the following undertakings when their franchises expired:

- North Melbourne Electric Tramway & Lighting Company in 1922
- Melbourne Electric Supply Company in 1930
- Electric Supply Company of Victoria in 1934
- Newport B Power Station from Victorian Railways in 1939
- Melbourne City Council Spencer Street Power Station in 1941
- Newport A Power Station from Victorian Railways in 1951
- Mildura Electrical Undertaking in 1953.

The SECV also took over a number of small municipal electricity distributors during the 1920s, and in the 1930 the Melbourne Electric Supply Company was acquired along with their street tramway operations in Geelong, followed by Electric Supply Company of Victoria in 1934 - similarly with their tram systems in Ballarat and Bendigo. Despite these acquisitions, municipal controlled distribution companies known as Municipal Electricity Undertakings (MEUs) in the inner urban areas of Melbourne remained outside of SECV control until the privatisation of the industry in the 1990s. The eleven municipalities which had MEUs were: Melbourne (established 1897), Footscray (1910), Brunswick (1912), Box Hill (1912), Port Melbourne (1912), Preston (1912), Northcote (1913), Heidelberg (1914), Coburg (1914), Doncaster & Templestowe (1914) and Williamstown (1915). The other councils purchased electricity in bulk from one of the private companies that operated a power station for distribution in its area. The private companies also operated their own distribution and retail networks in other areas of Melbourne, and in one case they also operated some of Melbourne's first electric tramways (in Essendon).

=== Pricing policy ===
Electricity pricing was set by the SECV, which set different tariffs for towns of different size, dependent on the costs of providing the electricity supply. Country interests argued that this was unfair to rural consumers, and in June 1928 a conference of rural and regional councils demanded the government equalise tariffs, but this was rejected by the Labor Government.

Equalisation of tariffs was not brought in until 1965, and it was due to the SECV itself rather than a response to political pressures.

=== Growth ===
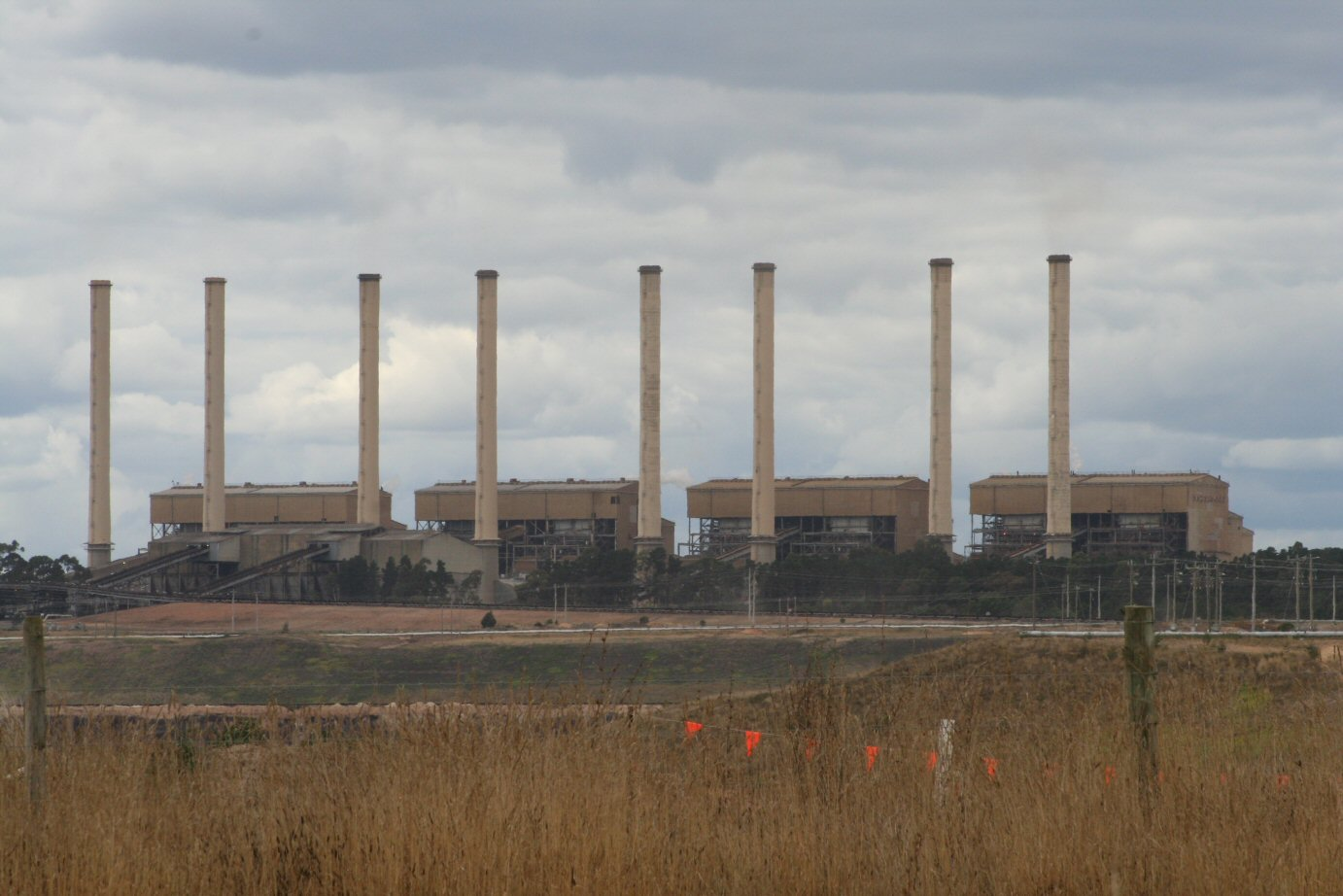
Hazelwood Power Station

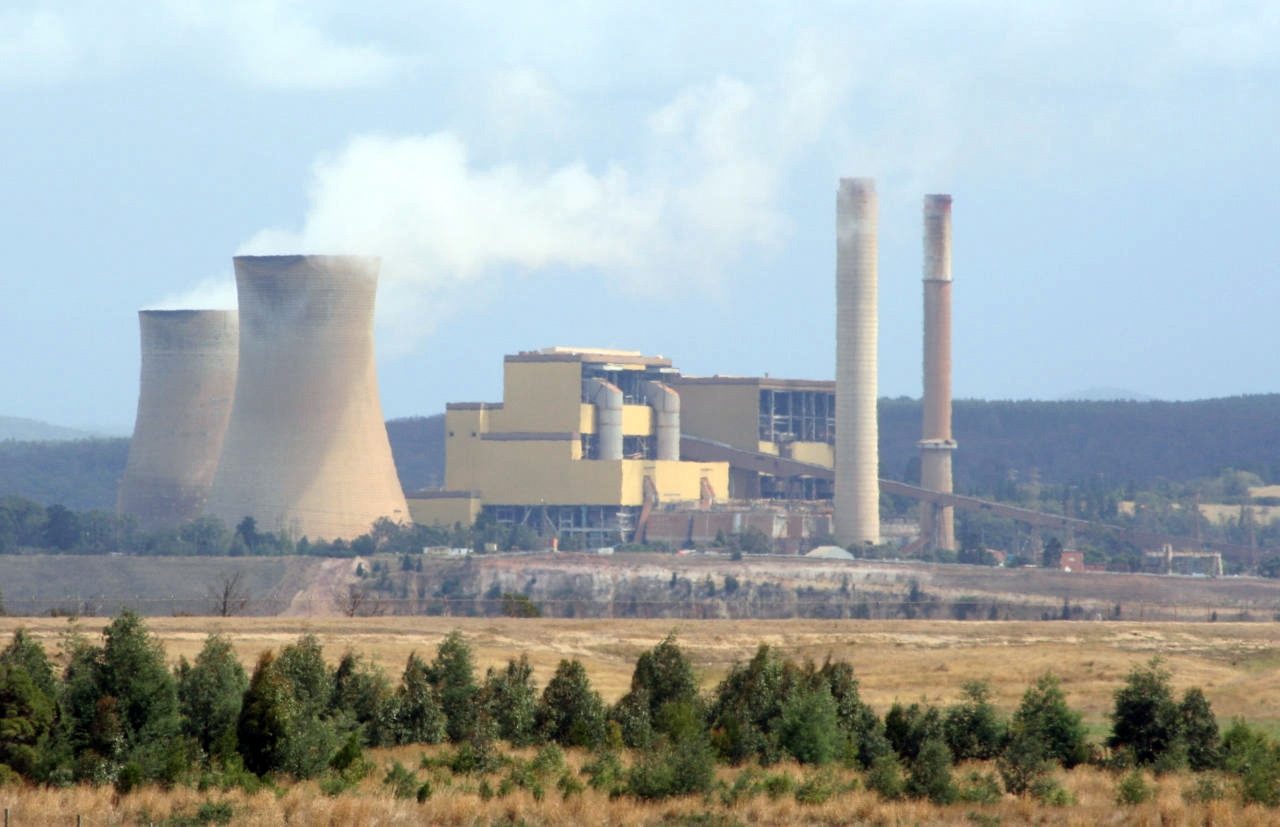
The modern Yallourn W plant

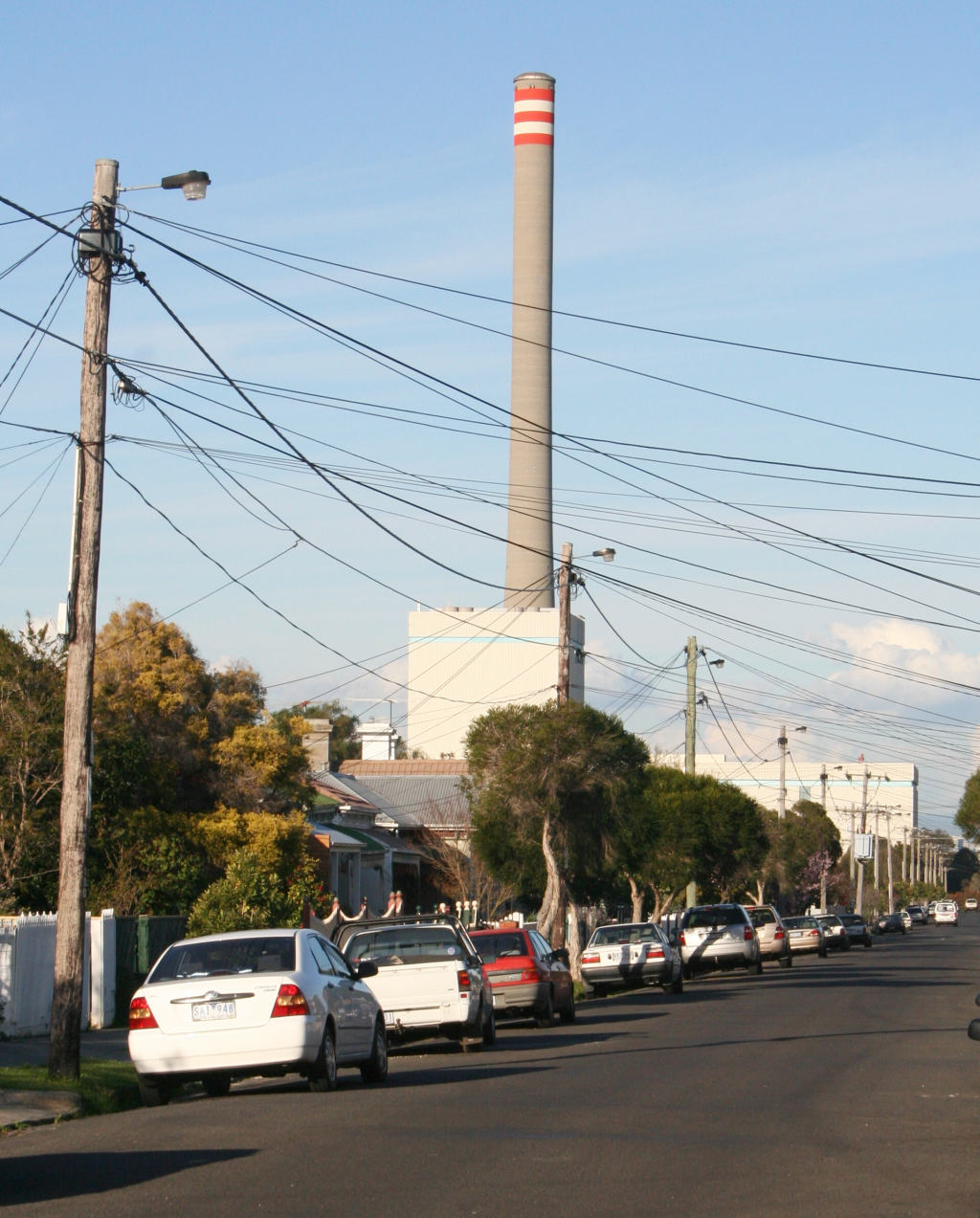
Newport Power Station in suburban Melbourne

During World War II construction and maintenance work had delayed, and after the war the SECV had difficulty with keeping up with increasing electricity demand. Existing thermal power stations were expanded at Yallourn and Newport, with much bigger generators of 50 MW capacity used, much larger than the 15-25 MW units used pre-war. The hydroelectric resources at Eildon and Kiewa also saw continued development. The Richmond Power Station was also converted to oil firing, and smaller 'prefabricated' power stations were erected in Geelong and Ballarat. These additions resulted in a reduction in the dependence on black coal by the 1950s.

By the 1960s the trend towards more efficient large capacity equipment continued, with additional generators of 120 MW capacity installed at Yallourn, and the Hazelwood Power Station with eight 200 MW units commissioned along with a new open cut mine and briquette factory. The Hazelwood mine was not as successful as planned as Morwell coal was unsuitable for making briquettes, resulting in coal needing to be railed from the Yallourn mine.

By the end of the decade brown coal was used to generate 90 per cent of Victoria's electricity supply, with all of the coal sourced from open cut mines under SECV control. As a result, the SECV was not forced to raise power costs during the 1970s oil price shocks, in contrast to other electricity suppliers around the world.

Expansion in the Latrobe Valley continued through the 1970s with the Yallourn W plant replacing the older units and delivering much greater reliability with Japanese and German technology, compared to the previously utilised equipment from the UK. A new gas fuelled power station was also proposed in the early 1970s for Newport to replace existing plant, but met considerable opposition from nearby residents becoming the first major SECV project that met widespread opposition from the general public. It was not opened until the 1980s and with only half the proposed capacity.

In the 1980s work on a third open cut commenced at Loy Yang, as the Yallourn and Morwell coal fields were both committed to fuel existing power stations. The plan was for two new stations (Loy Yang A and B) consisting all a total of eight 500 MW units, all fed by the common coal mine. The project was hit by cost overruns, with an independent review initiated by the government in late 1982, finding excessive rates of pay for construction and operation staff, poor project management, over investment in both the coal mine and power station and general overmanning.

Electricity costs to consumers also begun to rise in the 1980s, due to the need to pay greater dividends to the Victorian Government and to service greater debt levels from the heavy expansion. The SECV was also a part to the Portland Smelter Contract, which provided the Alcoa aluminium smelter with favourable electricity prices at the expense of other consumers.

=== Demise ===
In 1991, the Kirner Labor government began the process of privatising the SECV. The first stage in April 1992 was to sell a 51 percent interest in Loy Yang B to the private sector operator, Mission Energy Australia Pty Ltd. In 1994, the Kennett government further privatised the SECV, which led to the SECV being broken down into five distribution and retail companies (absorbing the MEUs in the process), five generation companies, and a transmission company. Along with other state-owned utilities (such as the Gas and Fuel Corporation of Victoria), these businesses were all corporatised, then privatised between 1995 and 1999.

The state government retained ownership of the wholesale market operator Victorian Power Exchange (VPX), which was subsequently reorganised with its market and system operation functions being transferred to the National Electricity Market Management Company (NEMMCO) and its transmission planning functions being transferred to VENCorp (now Australian Energy Markets Operator—AEMO).

=== Other responsibilities ===
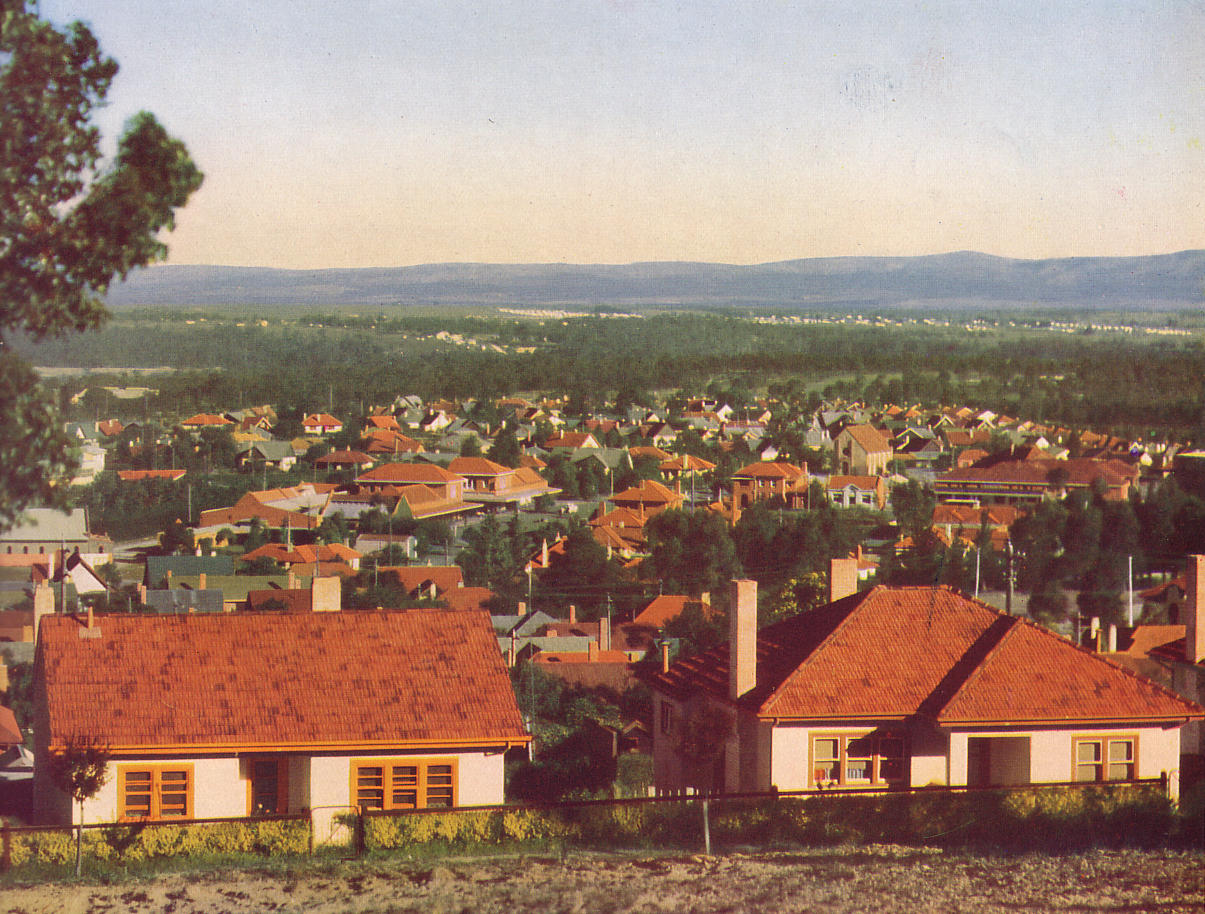
The company town of Yallourn

Other than electricity generation, the State Electricity Commission of Victoria also:

- Built and managed the company town of Yallourn for workers of the accompanying power station.
- Produced briquettes at Yallourn and Morwell from brown coal.
- Operated a 900mm gauge electric railway at Yallourn to convey coal from the open cut, later extended to Morwell and Hazelwood.
- Operated a dedicated fire and rescue service, known up to 1984 as the "SECV Fire Service", and post-1984 as "SECV Fire Rescue". The service comprised fully staffed 24-hour operating fire stations in the Yallourn, Morwell and Loy Yang production areas. Firefighting appliances consisted of Isuzu rear-mounted pumpers, Ford F350 V8 Turbo-charged Rescue tenders, MAN and Bedford 4wd 4000 litre capacity rural fire tankers, 4wd support vehicles and Volkswagen engine-powered trailer-mounted pumps. One each of these vehicles were located at each station, along with a single RFW 6 wheel Telesqurt / 75-foot Ladder/boom aerial vehicle. The Telesqurt was equipped with a high capacity centrifugal firefighting pump. SECV Fire Rescue staff provided basic "First Attack" fire fighting training to other SECV employees. Additional to their routine firefighting and rescue skills, SECV F&R firefighters were trained in Motor Vehicle Rescue, High-Angle Rescue techniques, Confined Space Firefighting and Rescue, Hazardous Materials Emergency Response, Industrial Firefighting and Emergency Response to High Voltage Istallations. A "memorandum of understanding" existed between the SECV and the Country Fire Authority, which allowed for the deployment, when required, of SECV Fire Rescue appliances and firefighters to emergency incidents outside of the SEC Works Areas.
- Operated six diesel shunting locomotives identical to the Victorian Railways F class for shunting the Yallourn, Morwell and Newport Powerhouse rail sidings.
- Operated and expanded the three provincial electric tramways in Ballarat, Bendigo and Geelong, after taking over the previous electricity-generating companies (the ESCo (Electric Supply Company of Victoria Ltd) and MESC (Melbourne Electric Supply Company)).

== Shell company (1994–2023) ==
The SECV continued as a much-diminished state-owned entity, run by an executive committee. It held indentures for debts owed to it by brown coal gasification company, HRL Limited, and remained the electricity supplier for the Portland aluminium smelter, under the name Vicpower Trading. It was also the electricity supplier to the Point Henry aluminium smelter, although that facility was closed in July 2016.

Currently, the Essential Services Commission of Victoria is responsible for the regulation of retail electricity distributors, and the Australian Energy Regulator is responsible for regulating distribution, transmission and the wholesale electricity market.

=== Successor electricity distributors in Victoria ===
After the 1990s privatisation, the retail electricity distribution companies were:

- United Energy
- Solaris Energy (merged into Australian Gas Light Company)
- Powercor Australia
- CitiPower
- Eastern Energy

As at March 2020, the current electricity distributors for Victorians are:

- CitiPower
- Jemena
- Powercor Australia
- AusNet Services
- United Energy

Each distributor is responsible for a geographic region of Victoria.

== Revival (2023–) ==
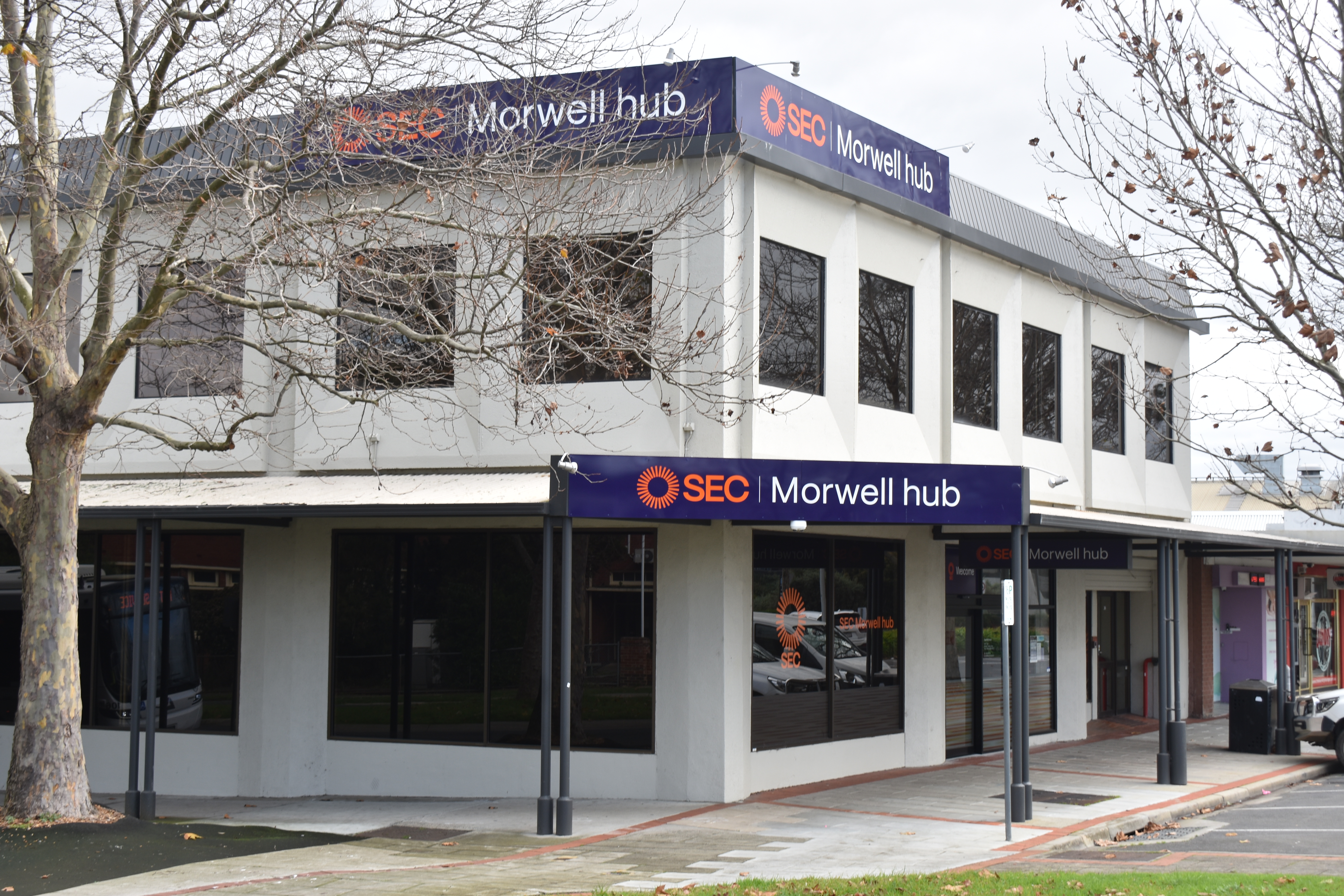
Morwell SEC office in 2026

In the lead-up to the 2022 Victorian state election, Premier Daniel Andrews committed to reviving the State Electricity Commission (SEC) if re-elected. The new state-owned entity would invest directly in renewable energy and electricity storage projects, in order to reach the state's target of 95% renewable energy by 2035 and net zero emissions by 2045. The government would have a 51% shareholding in renewable energy projects funded by the new State Electricity Commission.

Andrews committed to amending the state’s constitution to protect public ownership of the revived SEC if re-elected, to make it harder, although not impossible, for it to be privatised again in the future. Re-privatising the commission after such legislation would require a "special majority" of 60% of both the Legislative Assembly and Legislative Council, a situation which already exists for any potential privatisation of water services in Victoria under the Constitution of Victoria.

In the 2023/24 Victorian state budget, the government allocated $1 billion to the SEC to invest in renewable energy and storage. This investment had the goal of creating 4.5 gigawatts of renewable energy in Victoria. The SEC set up offices in Morwell and Melbourne, appointed an interim CEO, and established an expert advisory board to guide the SEC's approach to the energy market. One member of the advisory board, Alan Finkel, left the role in June 2023.

The revived SEC launched an expression of interest process for its first round of renewable energy investments. In September 2023 local media reported that there were more than 100 registrations of interest for projects in Victoria, with the proposals making up 30 gigawatts of energy storage and 24 gigawatts of new renewable energy. The new renewable energy, alongside existing private investment, was planned to facilitate the shutting down of the state's largest coal plant, Loy Yang A, between 2028 and 2030. The government planned to announce a 10-year plan for the SEC by the end of 2023.

=== State-owned company ===
New premier Jacinta Allan announced the organisation's 10-year plan in October 2023. Allan announced that the SEC would operate as an energy retailer, initially to industrial and commercial customers. The SEC would also focus on piloting and supporting household electrification, and building up the renewables workforce in Victoria, establishing SEC Centre of Training Excellence to train 6,000 traineeships and apprenticeships. The plan said that the revived SEC would operate as a state-owned company, SEC Victoria Pty Ltd, led by a CEO and board of directors registered under the Commonwealth Corporations Act 2001.

Simon Corbell, a former deputy chief minister of the Australian Capital Territory, was appointed chairman of the SEC board in April 2024.
