= Herbert Reah Harper =

British-born Australian electrical engineer

- Born: 23 June 1871; London, UK
- Died: 27 July 1956 (aged 85); Melbourne, Australia
- Citizenship: Australia
- Education: City and Guilds Technical College
- Engineering career
- Discipline: Engineer
- Institutions: State Electricity Commission of Victoria
- Awards: Kernot Medal, Peter Nicol Russell Medal

Herbert Reah Harper (23 June 1871 – 27 July 1956) was a British born, Australian electrical engineer who played an important role in the development of first the Melbourne electric supply and then the State Electricity Commission of Victoria.

== Personal life ==
Harper was born in London on 23 June 1871 to parents James Harper, a commercial traveller and Hannah, née Reah. Harper attended Dulwich College and studied engineering at the City and Guilds Technical College, Finsbury, then took up an apprenticeship at the Rennoldson Electrical Engineering Company, a Tyneside engineering firm located in South Shields, gaining experience in marine engineering.

He was engaged in England to Eva Beatrice Ellis, whom he married at St Alban's Church, Armadale in Melbourne on 11 January 1902 and had four children. He died at Toorak on 27 July 1956.

== British engineering work ==
In 1893, he began work at the Brush Electrical Engineering Company and in 1895 he supervised the installation of electric supply in Malta for that firm, staying on as chief engineer for the power authority. On return to England he supervised a number of tramway and town lighting systems. In 1889, he was sent to Melbourne as assistant to F. W. Clements, to manage the Brush Electrical Engineering Co subsidiary Electric Light and Traction Co.

== Australian roles ==
Harper became electrical engineer to the Melbourne City Council in 1901 (replacing Arthur Arnot), where he was involved in the expansion of the generation and distribution system including introducing three-phase transmission and a new generator at Spencer Street Power Station.

Harper was correspondent to the London Institution of Electrical Engineers and American Institute of Electrical Engineers, and following an overseas tour in 1911, recognised the potential for Victorian brown coal, after seeing Germany's use. He recommended the establishment of a public utility on the lines of the Ontario Hydro Electricity and was appointed to the government brown coal advisory committee (chaired by Department of Mines director Hyman Herman). This led to him becoming the first chief engineer on the State Electricity Commission of Victoria retiring in 1936.

== Awards and civic roles ==
- Electrical Supply Association of Australia (inaugural president 1918)
- Wallaby Club (president 1923)
- Institution of Engineers, Australia (president 1933)
- Army Mechanization Board (1941–45)
- Kernot Medal (The Melbourne University Engineering Foundation) 1935
- Peter Nicol Russell Medal (Institution of Engineers, Australia) 1938
- East St Kilda Anglican Church warden
- Melbourne Church of England Girls' Grammar School council

He is commemorated by the Monash University Harper Power Laboratory.
