= VENCorp =

- Company type: State-owned enterprise
- Founded: 11 December 1997
- Defunct: 2009
- Owner: Victorian State Government
- Website: www.vencorp.com.au

The Victorian Energy Networks Corporation (VENCorp) was a Victorian State Government-owned entity established on 11 December 1997 responsible for the efficient operation of gas and electricity industries in Victoria, Australia, within Victoria's privatised energy industries. It was funded by energy industry participants.

== Functions ==
VENCorp had major operational, planning and development roles for both gas and electricity, the key being:

- independent system operator for the Victorian gas transmission network
- manager and developer of the Victorian wholesale gas market
- system planner providing planning services for the gas and electricity industries.

== History ==
Since the 1950s, the Gas and Fuel Corporation was a government-owned monopoly supplier of household gas in Victoria. In 1965, natural gas was discovered in Bass Strait, and the Corporation undertook a conversion program, which took over 20-months ending in December 1970, to convert around one million appliances to operate on natural gas. In July 1994, the Gas and Fuel Corporation was dis-aggregated into three divisions: gas distributor and retail companies, a gas transmission company and an independent market operator, VENCorp. The Kennett Government subsequently privatised the gas distribution, retail and transmission divisions, along with the State Electricity Commission of Victoria, Victoria's main electricity utility. VENCorp remained a government entity though funded by energy industry participants.

VENCorp took over the electricity transmission planning function of the Victorian Power Exchange when it was wound up in 1998, after the establishment of NEMMCO and the commencement of the National Electricity Market.

The functions of VENCorp were assumed by the Australian Energy Market Operator, which commenced operations on 1 July 2009, and VENCorp was wound up.

== See also ==
- Energy policy of Australia
- Renewable energy commercialization in Australia
- Solar power in Australia
- Wind power in Australia
