= Walter Bassett =

Australian engineer

Sir Walter Eric Bassett
- Born: 19 December 1892; Hawthorn, Victoria, Australia
- Died: 8 March 1978 (aged 85); Toorak, Victoria, Australia
- Military career
- Allegiance: Australia
- Branch: Australian Army
- Service years: 1915–1918
- Rank: Lieutenant
- Units: 5th Field Company, Australian Flying Corps
- Conflicts: Western Front, First World War
- Awards: Military Cross, KBE
- Other work: Engineer, Academic, Consultant

Sir Walter Eric Bassett KBE, MC (19 December 1892 – 8 March 1978) was an Australian engineer, soldier and academic. He studied engineering at the University of Melbourne before joining the First Australian Imperial Force during the First World War. Bassett won the Military Cross for gallantry on the Western Front before transferring to the Australian Flying Corps. Wounded in the hip on 1 June 1917 Bassett was disabled for the remainder of his life. On his return to Australia he joined the faculty at his alma mater, lecturing in mechanical engineering and aerodynamics. Bassett arranged the construction of the first wind tunnel in Australia. He later helped establish aeronautical engineering courses in Sydney and, in 1958, joined Monash University as a lecturer and member of its council. Bassett received honorary doctorates from Monash and Melbourne.

Even during his early academic career Bassett maintained a private engineering practice, providing heating and ventilation consultancy services. His systems were installed in many prestigious buildings in Victoria and elsewhere in Australia. During the Second World War he was chairman of the Australian Army's Mechanisation Board and a member of the Commonwealth Advisory Committee for Aeronautics as well as carrying out works in war factories and military hospitals. Bassett's firm was highly active in the post-war years and he was knighted in 1959. Bassett retired in 1971, but continued to work on a consultancy basis until his death.

== Early life and military service ==
Bassett was born on 19 December 1892 in Hawthorn, Victoria, to Walter Bassett, a salesman, and Caroline née Loxton. His parents were both English-born. Bassett was educated at Wesley College and the University of Melbourne, from which he received a bachelor of engineering degree in 1916.

Bassett joined the First Australian Imperial Force on 30 September 1915, for service in the First World War. He was posted to the 5th Field Company, an engineering unit. Bassett left Australia on 23 November, headed for Egypt. He was afterwards deployed to the Western Front. As a lieutenant, Bassett was awarded the Military Cross for conspicuous gallantry in action during the night of 4–5 August 1915 at Pozières, France. His medal citation records that Bassett constructed machine-gun emplacements in captured German trenches and, later, a communications trench while under heavy fire.

On 19 April 1917 Bassett transferred to the Australian Flying Corps, serving with the Royal Air Force's No. 40 Squadron. He was wounded in the hip on 1 June 1917 and evacuated to England. Bassett's injury required him to use a walking stick for the remainder of his life. He was declared unfit for future service and his employment ceased on 28 January 1918.

== Academic career ==
Bassett returned to Melbourne and studied aeronautics. He joined the faculty of the University of Melbourne's engineering school in 1919, lecturing in mechanical engineering and aerodynamics. At Melbourne Bassett arranged the construction of the first wind tunnel in Australia. He married the historian Marnie Bassett in a Methodist ceremony at the university rooms of her father, Sir David Orme Masson, on 25 January 1923. They had two sons and a daughter; the eldest son drowned during the Second World War.

Bassett received a master of mechanical engineering degree from the University of Melbourne in 1927. Bassett received the university's Kernot Memorial Medal in 1948. Bassett also helped to establish aeronautical engineering degree courses in Sydney and helped establish the Aeronautical Research Laboratories at Melbourne in 1949. In 1958 he was appointed to the interim council of the Monash University, which was then under construction. He sat on its building committee and was much involved in its planning. Bassett was a member of its first formal council and served as an engineering lecturer until 1973. Bassett received an honorary doctorate in engineering from the university in 1970 and, one in laws from the University of Melbourne in 1974.

== Engineering practice ==
During his early academic career Bassett maintained a private engineering practice which was consulted on heating and ventilation matters by architects of prestigious buildings such as the chapter house at St Paul's Cathedral, Melbourne, the Frankston Orthopaedic Hospital, the Melbourne Town Hall and the Williamstown Town Hall. Bassett established a full-time engineering firm with two staff in 1928, establishing W. E. Bassett & Partners, though he also remained a member of the university faculty until 1957. He maintained a focus on heating and ventilation services, providing design and supervision for systems in numerous hospitals, offices and G.J. Coles stores. He pioneered designs such as a carbon dioxide–based air conditioning system used at the Bank of New South Wales headquarters in Melbourne and installed the first centrifugal air conditioning systems in Australia at Parliament House, Adelaide, and The Courier-Mail offices in Brisbane. By 1939 he had expanded with offices in New South Wales.

During the Second World War Bassett served as chairman of the Australian Army's Mechanisation Board and as a member of the Commonwealth Advisory Committee for Aeronautics. His firm carried out works for the government, installing equipment at aircraft production facilities, munitions facilities and military hospitals. He also installed six low-pressure chambers for training Royal Australian Air Force personnel in high-altitude operations and assisted in the installation of a penicillin fermentation plant for the Commonwealth Serum Laboratories. In 1942 he served as president of the Institution of Engineers Australia (IEAust), of which he had been a founding member in 1919.

Bassett's firm prospered in the post-war recovery, carrying out works in rural hospitals and newly built factories, including for Holden and the Queensland sugar industry. From 1951 to 1975 he was a member of the government-owned Gas and Fuel Corporation of Victoria. In 1958 Bassett received the Peter Nicol Russell Memorial Medal from the IEAust. He was appointed a Knight Commander of the Order of the Bath in the 1959 Birthday Honours for public services. By 1971 Bassett's engineering practice employed 250 people in nine offices and had three associate companies overseas. Bassett retired in 1971 but continued to provide advice on a consultancy basis until his death.

== Other interests ==
Bassett was a director of Renison from 1958 to 1968 and of the Mount Lyell Mining and Railway Company from 1969 to 1974. He was also director of Colonial Mutual and several fertiliser companies.

In 1963 he was elected president of the Melbourne Club. In 1973 he was appointed an honorary member of the Australasian Institute of Mining and Metallurgy and was the founding president of the Copper Producers' Association of Australia. He was also a trustee and member of the finance committee of the Melbourne Museum of Applied Science and an honorary consultant to and member of the finance committee at the Parkes Observatory. In his spare time he enjoyed sailing, fishing, golf and woodwork.

Bassett died at Toorak on 8 March 1978 and was cremated. The main lecture theatre at the engineering school at Monash University is named in Bassett's honour. W. E. Bassett and Partners was bought by AECOM in 2004.
