= Wallaby Club =

Walking club in Melbourne, Victoria, Australia

- Formation: 1894

The Wallaby Club is a private walking club in Melbourne, Victoria (Australia), which was established in 1894. The club is based on "good fellowship, talking and an appreciation of both the natural and built environments". Membership is by invitation only and strictly limited. The club motto is À Votre Santé ('to your health').

== Origin ==
The Wallaby Club was the idea of a Melbourne physician, Dr Louis Henry, who intended it to embody the Johnsonian definition of "an assembly of good fellows, meeting under certain conditions". The club members include, professionals, artists, teachers, musicians, writers. The focus on walking was not for athleticism, which was anathema to the founder, "...but as a means to outdoor enjoyment, conducive to health, conversation and good companionship".

The Wallaby Club is considered among the first true walking clubs in Australia. The club keeps a ceremonial walking stick known as the "ANZAC stick" and believed to have been brought back from Gallipoli. It is used as the presidential mace, with bands for each of the presidents (now completely covering the stick).

== Notable members ==
- Ian Clunies Ross
- Owen Dixon
- Andrew Fisher
- Edmund Gill
- Brian Harper
- Herbert Reah Harper
- William Charles Kernot
- John Monash
