= Victorian Power Exchange =

The Victorian Power Exchange (VPX) was established in 1995 by the Victoria State Government as part of a restructuring of the State Electricity Commission of Victoria (SECV) and the establishment of a competitive electricity market.

== Overview ==
Its functions were to monitor and control the wholesale power exchange; ensure security of the power system; and plan and direct the augmentation of the transmission system within Victoria.

The design of the electricity market and the operation of the power exchange formed the basis for the National Electricity Market.

VPX was a not-for-profit corporation owned by the Government of Victoria. The board of directors comprised representatives of the electricity industry and independent members.

VPX was wound up in 1998 with the establishment of NEMMCO and the commencement of the National Electricity Market. VPX's transmission planning function was transferred to VENCorp, which had been established in December 1997.
