= William Charles Kernot =

Australian engineer (1845–1909)

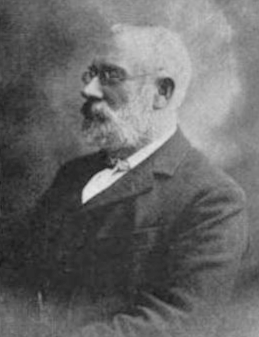
- Born: 16 June 1845; Rochford, Essex, England
- Died: 14 March 1909 (aged 63); Parkville, Victoria, Australia
- Education: University of Melbourne
- Occupation: Engineer

William Charles Kernot (16 June 1845 – 14 March 1909), was an Australian engineer, first professor of engineering at the University of Melbourne, and president of the Royal Society of Victoria.

William Charles Kernot was born in Rochford, Essex, England. His father, Charles Kernot, was a chemist and politician.

Kernot was president of the Wallaby Club in 1901. He was also interested in astronomy, member of the British Astronomical Association from 26 May 1897 until his death.

Kernot died at Parkville, Victoria on 14 March 1909. He never married.

The Kernot Memorial Medal, awarded to Australian engineers, was instituted in his honour.
