= EWater =

Non-profit organization

eWater is a non-profit organisation established by Australian Federal and State Governments.

eWater provides stewardship, management, development, enhancement, skills-building, research, access and transparency relating to Australian water management tools and services in the interests of government members, stakeholders, clients and customers and on behalf of the Australian people who have invested in the organisation.

The role of its software and hydrology business is to support integrated water resources management in Australia through development and implementation of the national hydrological modelling strategy (NHMS). eWater develops and supports a number of software tools for hydrological modelling. these tools include eWater Source, and eWater MUSIC.

In support of its traditional business operations, eWater expanded its operations internationally to deliver international development initiatives across the Indo-Pacific region and beyond through its two businesses - the Australian Water Partnership, funded by the Australian Government Department of Foreign Affairs and Trade, and eWater Solutions.

== History ==
In 1992 the CRC for Catchment Hydrology (CRCCH) was formed to produce a decision support system able to predict movement of water, particulates and solutes from land to rivers followed in 1993 by the CRC for Freshwater Ecology (CRCFH).

Model for Urban Stormwater Improvement Conceptualisation (MUSIC) was launched in 2002 Development of The Invisible Modelling Environment (TIME) enabling development and integration of models, which is used by many tools made by eWater

In 2004 the Catchment modelling Toolkit was released

eWater Ltd was established in 2005 and CRCFE and CRCCH were merged and relaunched as eWater CRC

eWater CRC ends and eWater Ltd continues as a non-profit organisation

Minister for the Environment Senator Penny Wong announces eWater Source as the new COAG endorsed National Hydrological Platform and in 2014 the Source Public modelling tool is launched as a free software package

== eWater Source™ ==
eWater Source, an integrated water resource management modelling tool developed by eWater Ltd is used to create hydrological models used for integrated planning, management and operations for catchment and river systems, including demands for water from urban areas, agriculture and the environment

The package has been used to build river and catchment models in every state of Australia as well as many other countries including India, Pakistan, China and the Mekong River system

The MDBA has implemented a Source management model of the Murray and Lower Darling River System.

The Queensland Government is now working with Source in five river basins: the Pioneer, Fitzroy, Condamine-Balonne, Cape, and Flinders and Gilbert. Over 30 earlier catchment Source models were implemented under the Great Barrier Reef Action Plan

New South Wales is implementing the Namoi River System and Murrimbidgee river system using Source.

Victoria is implementing the Loddon, Campaspe, Broken and Coliban components of a broader northern Victoria Source model centred on the Goulburn River system.

== TIME (The Invisible Modelling Environment) ==
The Invisible Modelling Environment (TIME) is a software development framework for creating, testing and delivering environmental simulation models. TIME includes support for the representation, management and visualisation of a variety of data types, as well as support for testing, integrating and calibrating simulation models.

TIME provides a framework for spatial and temporal data analysis. TIME has been developed under the sponsorship of eWater CRC and its predecessor CRC for Catchment Hydrology. As well as providing a modelling framework, TIME supports model users with a range of data analysis and management, model processing and visualisation tools.

TIME is a core component of a large range of formal software products, as well as numerous research programs. Currently the TIME code base is incorporated into approximately 23 eWater supported applications.

The eWater Source products are a major focus of this product range and are extensively used by government and private enterprise in addressing water quantity and quality policy questions. Time is also integrated into a range of CSIRO specific products and projects such as the “Hydrologists Workbench” and the Australian Water Resources Assessment (AWRA) system, a continental water balance monitoring system that is being developed jointly by CSIRO and the Bureau of Meteorology.

== eWater Toolkit ==
The eWater Toolkit is a source of software tools and information related to the modelling and management of water resources, including water quality tools. It provides a web-based distribution point for hydrological, ecological and catchment management models, databases and other resources.

== MUSIC ==
MUSIC predicts the performance of stormwater quality management systems as an aid to decision-making. It is intended to help organisations plan and design (at a conceptual level) appropriate urban stormwater management systems for their catchments that meet Water Sensitive Urban Design Standards
