= Jörg Imberger =

Australian civil engineer (born 1942)

Jörg Imberger AM FAA (born September 10, 1942) is an Australian civil engineer.

Imberger studied civil engineering at the University of Melbourne, graduating with a bachelor's degree in 1963. He pursued further study in the subject at the University of Western Australia, completing a master's degree in 1966. Imberger earned his doctorate in civil engineering with specialization in coastal engineering from the University of California, Berkeley in 1970. Imberger began teaching as an associate professor at Berkeley in 1976. He returned to Australia to assume the Winthrop Professorship at the University of Western Australia in 1979. After his retirement in 2015, Imberger accepted an adjunct professorship at the University of Miami.

Over the course of his career, Imberger has received the Peter Nicol Russell Memorial Medal (1995), the Stockholm Water Prize (2001), and the A.C. Redfield Lifetime Achievement Award (2007), among others. He became a member of the Order of Australia in 1992, and a fellow of the Australian Academy of Science in 1993. Imberger has been elected to an equivalent honor within the Australian Academy of Technological Sciences and Engineering, as well as the Institute of Engineers, Australia, American Geophysical Union (2007), and Royal Academy of Engineering (2008). In 2006, he was elected a member of the National Academy of Engineering for contributions to and international leadership in the environmental fluid dynamics of lakes, reservoirs, estuaries, and coastal seas.
