= Hyman Herman =

Australian geologist and engineer

- Born: 16 August 1875; Bendigo
- Died: 7 June 1962 (aged 86); Melbourne, Australia
- Citizenship: Australia
- Engineering career
- Discipline: geologist and engineer
- Institutions: State Electricity Commission of Victoria

Hyman Herman (August 16, 1875 – June 7, 1962) was an Australian geologist and engineer, and was described as the 'father of Yallourn'. He was director of the Victorian Department of Mines and chair of the Government Brown Coal Advisory Committee. He was instrumental in the establishment of the Victorian State Electricity Commission taking a role as engineer for brown coal.

Herman was born at Sandhurst (Bendigo) on 16 August 1875 to Polish father Solomon Herman from Konin, British mother Elizabeth, née Oxlake who migrated to Australia in 1864. He married Florence Leslie Ramsay Salmon 2 April 1902, had three daughters and died on 7 June 1962.

As chair of the Government Brown Coal Advisory Committee, which reported in September 1917, he recommended the establishment of an Electricity Commission to develop the brown coal reserves and construct a power station and transmission lines. In December 1918, a Bill was passed establishing the State Electricity Commission of Victoria.

== Education ==
Gravel Hill State School (under scholarships),

Sandhurst Corporate High School,

Scotch College 1890,

D.Sc. (Melbourne, 1924) he submitted 'The Structure of the Bendigo goldfields',

University of Melbourne engineering 1891 -1896.

B.C.E., 1896

== Employment ==
- Geological Survey, Victorian Department of Mines and Water Supply 1895
- acting director of the Geological Survey 1900
- assistant manager Mt Bischoff Tin Mining Co. Waratah.
- private practice Queen Street Melbourne 1907
- company director, consultant manager, Australian Mining Standard correspondent
- director of the Victorian Geological Survey 1912
- chairman of advisory committee on coal and electricity 1917
- engineer SEC brown coal research and briquetting 1920
- advisor to South Australian government on brown coal-mining 1926

== Societies ==
He was a member of the Australasian Institute of Mining Engineers and its president for the year 1914

== Commissions and conferences ==
- Australian Power Survey 1928
- World Power Conference in Washington 1936
- royal commission on Western Australian coal industry 1931, 1933
- consultant engineer S.E.C. 1933–48

== Publications ==
- Brown Coal : with special reference to the State of Victoria, Commonwealth of Australia, State Electricity Commission of Victoria, Melbourne, 1952
- Utilization of brown coal in Victoria Melb. : S.E.C.?
- Report of the Advisory Committee on Brown Coal. Victoria. Advisory Committee on Brown Coal. Melbourne : Government Printer 1917

for a photographic Portrait see Museum Victoria
