= Ian McLennan =

Australian businessman (1909–1998)

Sir Ian McLennan KCMG KBE FAA FTSE HonFAusIMM
- Born: Ian Munro McLennan; 30 November 1909; Stawell Australia
- Died: 25 October 1998 (aged 88); Melbourne Australia
- Education: Scotch College
- Alma mater: University of Melbourne
- Occupations: Business executive; company director
- Awards: Knight Commander of the Order of St Michael and St George; Knight Commander of the Order of the British Empire; Fellow of the Australian Academy of Science

Sir Ian Munro McLennan (30 November 1909 – 25 October 1998) was an Australian director of public companies, most notably as Chairman of Australia's then largest company, the Broken Hill Proprietary Company Limited (BHP).

McLennan was born in Stawell, Victoria, and spent his early childhood at Mooroopna. He attended Scotch College, Melbourne as a boarder, where he was equal Dux of School in 1927. After leaving school he studied electrical engineering at the University of Melbourne and was a resident at the University's Ormond College.

After graduating from university in 1932 he joined the Broken Hill Proprietary Company Limited (BHP) as a cadet in its Whyalla works and at the nearby Iron Knob iron-ore mine. In April 1971 McLennan was appointed Chairman and Director of Administration of BHP, positions he held until 1977 when he reached the compulsory retirement age for BHP directors. Thus, in just less than forty years he had moved through the company ranks to its most senior position. During that time he had guided the company though a series of major changes including its move into petroleum exploration and production in offshore Bass Strait.

His directorships and roles included:

- Chairman of BHP
- Chairman of ANZ Bank
- Director of ICI Australia
- Chairman of Interscan Australia Pty Ltd
- Director of Henry Jones IXL
- Member of the General Motors Advisory Council

He was a Fellow of the Australian Academy of Science (FAA), a Foundation Fellow of the Australian Academy of Technological Sciences and Engineering (FTSE), and also the Foundation President of ATSE (1975–1983). He was made an honorary fellow of the Australasian Institute of Mining and Metallurgy (HonFAusIMM) in 1979, and was on its council, and was its president in 1940.

In 1956, he was made a Commander of the Order of the British Empire (CBE) for his services as a member of the Immigration Planning Council. In 1963, he was elevated to Knight Commander of the Order of the British Empire (KBE) for services to industry.

McLennan endowed his old school, Scotch College, Melbourne with the Sir Ian McLennan Chair of Design and Technology.

He died in Melbourne in 1998.

== Honours and awards ==
- 1964: James N. Kirby Medal of the Institute of Production Engineers
- 1968: Honorary Doctorates of Engineering, University of Melbourne and University of Newcastle
- 1968: Peter Nicol Russell Memorial Medal of the Institution of Engineers, Australia
- 1981: Charles F. Rand Memorial Gold Medal of the American Institute of Mining, Metallurgical, and Petroleum Engineers
- 1981: Bessemer Gold Medal of The Metals Society (Great Britain).
- 1979: Knight Commander of the Order of St Michael and St George (KCMG) for services to youth, the community and industry
- 1986: The First Class Order of the Sacred Treasure from the Emperor of Japan

Business positions
Preceded by Angus Mackinnon	Chairman of ANZ Banking Group; 1977 – 1982	Succeeded by Sir William Vines
