= List of defunct utility companies in Victoria =

The Australian state of Victoria has a number of defunct energy supply and distribution utility companies.

== Electricity ==
=== The North Melbourne Electric Tramways and Lighting Company ===
The North Melbourne Electric Tramways and Lighting Company operated an electric tramway system beginning in 1906, with the network being based upon the suburb of Essendon. The company also supplied electric power to the neighbouring suburbs from its power station on Mount Alexander Road, near the intersection with South Street. The power generation side of the company was acquired by the State Electricity Commission of Victoria in 1922, when its 15-year franchise expired, and the tram side was acquired by the Melbourne & Metropolitan Tramways Board on 21 December 1922.

=== Melbourne Electric Supply Company ===
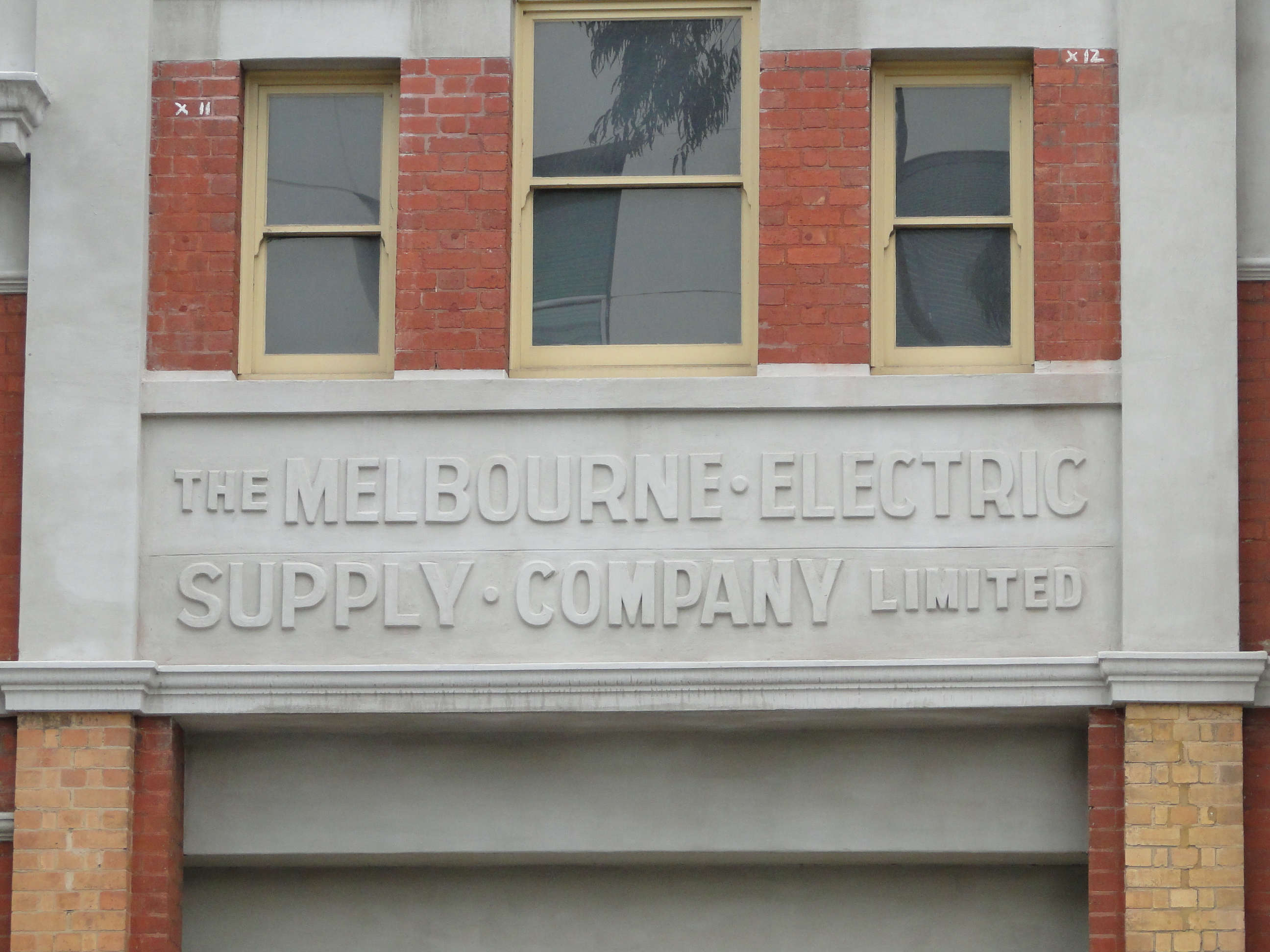
Sign over the entrance to the Geelong Tram Depot

The Melbourne Electric Supply Company was registered in 1899 as the Electric Lighting and Traction Company of Australia, led by F. W. Clements and assisted by Herbert Reah Harper. The company's records go back to 1892. It was registered in England, and started supplying power to Melbourne and Geelong before purchasing the South Australian Electric Light and Motive Power Company in Adelaide and Port Adelaide, in the colony of South Australia. The company was renamed to the Melbourne Electric Supply Company in 1908. The company operated the Richmond and Geelong power stations. In July 1910, it was granted a 30-year lease to operate the electric tramway system in Geelong. The company was acquired by the State Electricity Commission of Victoria in 1930, before the expiration of the 30-year franchise of the electricity business.

=== Electric Supply Company of Victoria ===
The Electric Supply Company of Victoria was a British company with its headquarters in the English city of Liverpool. It was formed in 1903 as a subsidiary of the British Insulated Wire Company. The company operated power stations and electric tramways in the regional cities of Bendigo and Ballarat. The Electric Supply Company of Victoria was acquired by the State Electricity Commission of Victoria in 1934, when its 30-year franchise expired.

=== State Electricity Commission of Victoria ===
The State Electricity Commission of Victoria was a state owned utility established in 1919 to manage the generation and distribution of electricity in Victoria, as well as to maintain and operate the three provincial electric tramways acquired from the Electric Supply Company of Victoria Ltd. (Ballarat and Bendigo) and the Melbourne Electric Supply Company Ltd (Geelong). The commission was split into three parts in 1993: generation, transmission, and retail. In 1994 these parts were again split and later privatised.

== Gas ==
=== Bendigo Gas Company ===
The Bendigo Gas Company was incorporated by the Bendigo Gas Company's Act 1860 (24 Vict. No. 102).

=== Castlemaine Gas Company ===
The Castlemaine Gas Company was incorporated by the Castlemaine Gas Company's Act 1859 (22 Vict. No. 71). It was bought out by the Gas and Fuel Corporation of Victoria in 1956.

=== City of Melbourne Gas and Coke Company ===
The City of Melbourne Gas and Coke Company was incorporated by the City of Melbourne Gas and Coke Company's Act 1853 (16 Vict.). It became part of the Metropolitan Gas Company in 1877.

=== Collingwood Fitzroy and District Gas and Coke Company ===
The Collingwood Fitzroy and District Gas and Coke Company was incorporated by the Collingwood Fitzroy and District Gas and Coke Company's Act 1860 (24 Vict. No. 103), and became part of the Metropolitan Gas Company in 1877.

=== South Melbourne Gas Company ===
The South Melbourne Gas Company was incorporated by the South Melbourne Gas Company's Act 1872 (36 Vict. No. 426). It became part of the Metropolitan Gas Company in 1877.

=== Metropolitan Gas Company ===
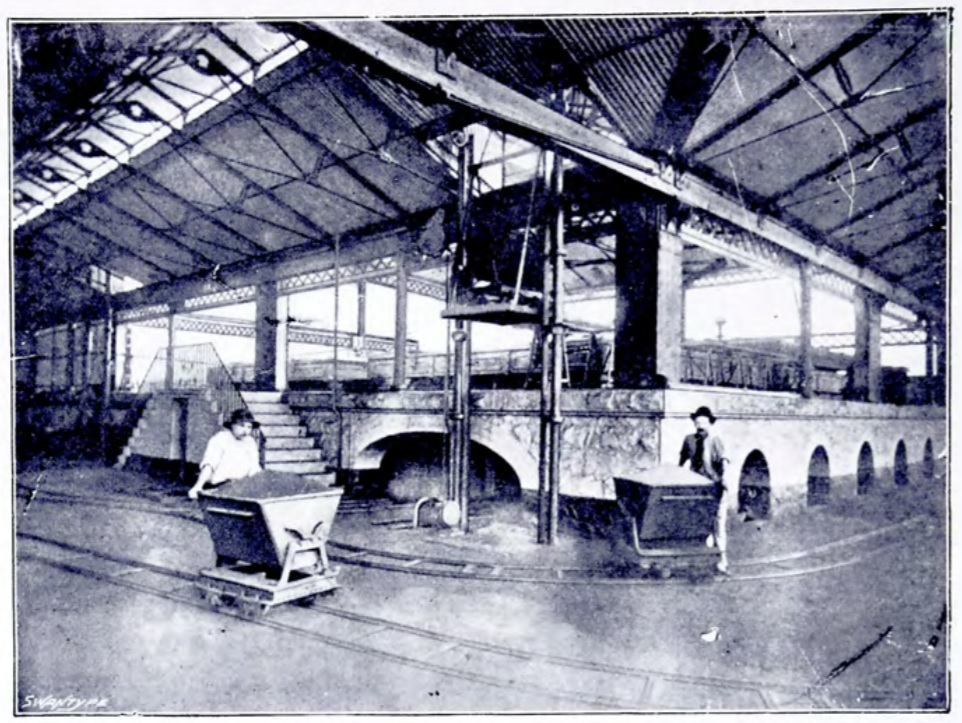
Decauville track and tip-wagons being used at Metropolitan Gas Co. of Melbourne in conjunction with an hydraulic lift raising the trucks, c. 1904

The Metropolitan Gas Company was created by the (41 Vict. No. 586) by the amalgamation of City of Melbourne Gas and Coke Company, the Collingwood Fitzroy and District Gas and Coke Company, and the South Melbourne Gas Company.

It supplied town gas to the city of Melbourne. Between 1904 and 1906, it took over the Brunswick Gas and Coke Company. The Metropolitan Gas Company was absorbed into the Gas and Fuel Corporation of Victoria in 1951.

=== Ballaarat Gas Company ===
The Ballaarat Gas Company was incorporated by the Ballaarat Gas Company's Act 1857 (21 Vict. No. 27) to supply town gas to the city of Ballarat in 1857. The company was wound up upon the introduction of natural gas to Ballarat in early 1970s.

=== Brighton Gas Company ===
The Brighton Gas Company was founded in 1877. It was taken over by the Gas and Fuel Corporation of Victoria in 1951.

=== Geelong Gas Company ===
The Geelong Gas Company was set up by the Geelong Gas Company's Act 1858 (21 Vict. No. 57) to supply town gas to the city of Geelong in 1858. It was purchased by the Gas and Fuel Corporation of Victoria in 1971 when natural gas was introduced to the city.

=== Gas and Fuel Corporation of Victoria ===
The Gas and Fuel Corporation of Victoria (G&FC) was established in 1950. It took over two of the three main gas utilities in Melbourne – the Metropolitan Gas Company and the Brighton Gas Company, and over time acquired the other local gas authorities and private gas companies. As part of the conversion to natural gas, in 1971 the G&FC acquired the Geelong Gas Company, one of only two remaining private gas companies in Victoria at the time. The Ballaarat Gas Company closed at the time. The G&FC was disaggregated in the 1990s, privatised and wound up in June 1995.
