= Hazelwood Power Station =

Brown-coal fueled thermal power station

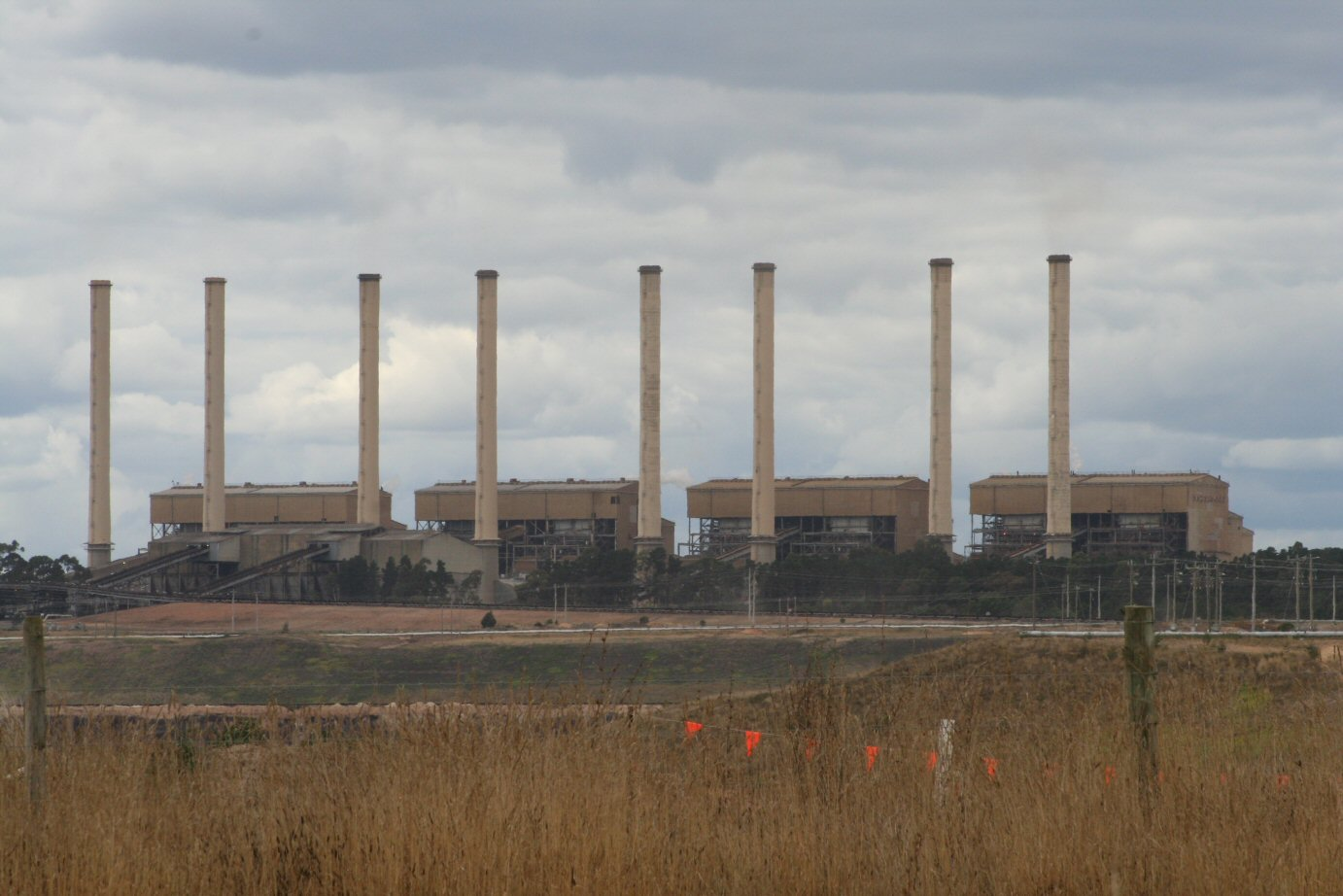
- Country: Australia
- Location: Latrobe Valley, Victoria
- Coordinates: 38°16′22″S 146°23′30″E
- Status: Decommissioned
- Commission date: 1964
- Decommission date: 2017
- Owners: 72% Engie; 28% Mitsui & Co.

Thermal power station
- Primary fuel: Lignite
- Turbine technology: Steam turbine

Power generation
- Units operational: 6 x CA Parsons & Company 2 aei units
- Nameplate capacity: 1,600 MW (2,100,000 hp)
- Annual net output: 12,000 GWh (43,000 TJ)

External links
- Website: www.gdfsuezau.com/about-us/asset/Hazelwood
- Commons: Related media on Commons

The Hazelwood Power Station is a decommissioned brown-coal fuelled thermal power station located in the Latrobe Valley of Victoria, Australia. Built between 1964 and 1971, the 1,600-megawatt-capacity power station was made up of eight 200MW units, and supplied up to 25% of Victoria's base load electricity and more than 5% of Australia's total electricity demand. It was a 'subcritical' pulverized coal-fired boiler. The station was listed as the least carbon efficient power station in the OECD in a 2005 report by WWF Australia, making it one of the most polluting power stations in the world. At 1.56 tonnes of CO_{2} for each megawatt hour of electricity, it was 50% more polluting than the average black-coal power station in New South Wales or Queensland. Hazelwood emitted 14% of Victoria's annual greenhouse gas emissions and 3% of Australia's greenhouse gas emissions.

International Power plc purchased Hazelwood Power Station and the adjoining mine from the Victorian Government in 1996 with an expected 40-year life. In 2005, the Bracks government approved an environmental effects statement (EES) that allowed Hazelwood to relocate a road and a section of the Morwell River to allow access to an additional 43 million tonnes of coal in addition to that allowed under the mining licence boundaries set at the time of privatisation. This was estimated to provide sufficient coal for the plant to operate to at least 2030 (prior to decommissioning plans). The EES also capped its expected total greenhouse output at 445 million tonnes of carbon dioxide over its life, after which Hazelwood may have been made to cease operation.

Hazelwood was jointly owned by Engie with a 72% share and Mitsui & Co with a 28% share. In 2014, Hazelwood employed 495 staff directly and on average 300 contractors. On 3 November 2016, Engie announced that the entire Hazelwood plant would be closed at the end of March 2017 giving five months notice of the closure. The power station closed in March 2017. When the power station closed, wholesale prices in Victoria were up 85% on 2016, according to the Australian Energy Regulator, and for the first time in almost a decade, the state relied on energy from interstate to meet its needs.

A 150 MW one-hour grid battery opened in June 2023, and a 100 MW two-hour battery opened in September 2025.

== History ==
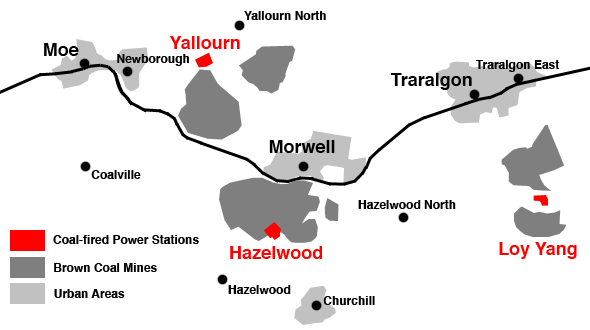
A map of the major towns and coal-fired power stations in the Latrobe Valley

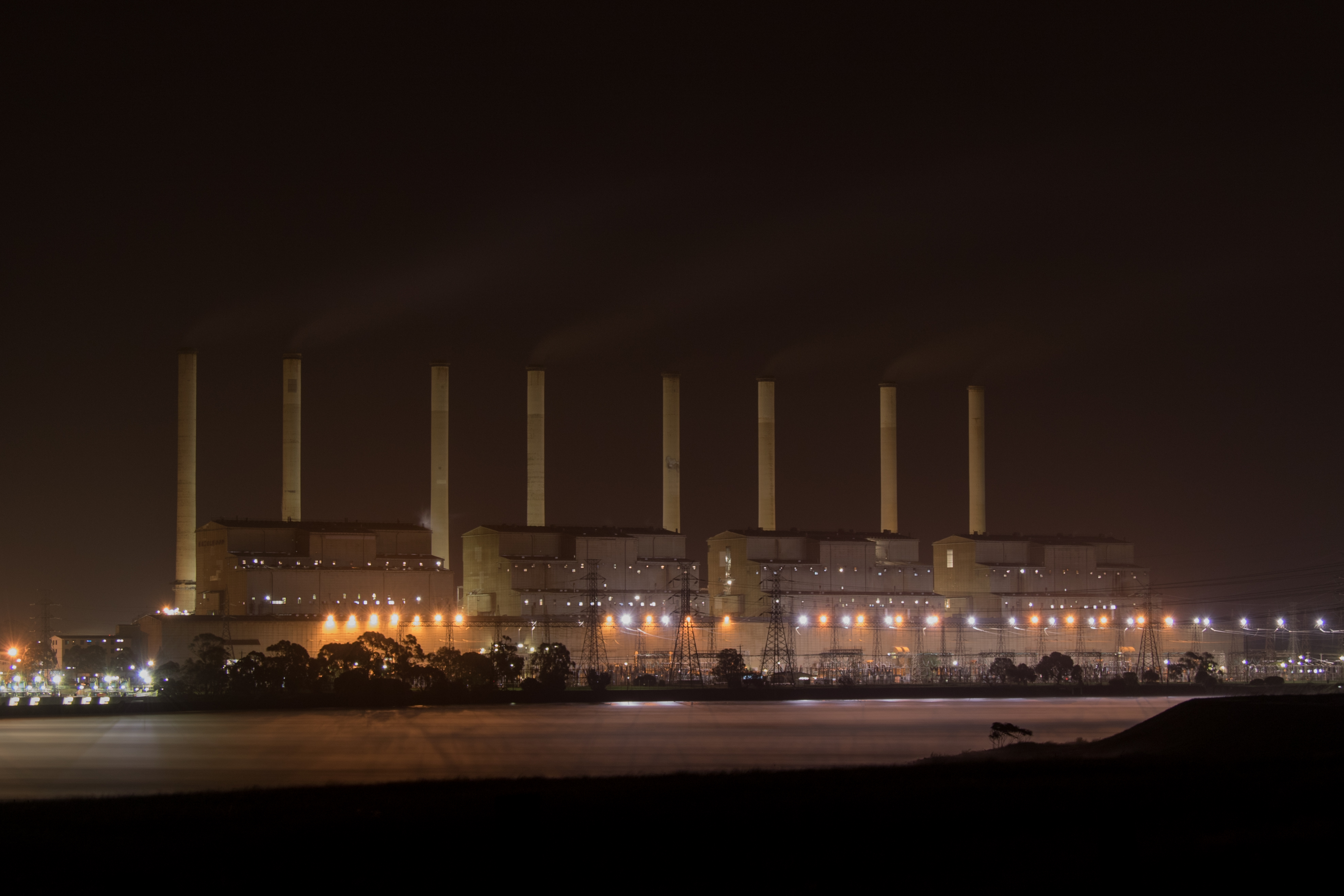
Hazelwood Power Station at night in 2016

Development of the brown coal reserves at Morwell was started by the State Electricity Commission of Victoria (SECV) in 1949 as the 'Morwell Project', which included the Morwell open cut mine, and the Morwell briquette works. The Morwell Interconnecting Railway linked the power station and briquette works to the Yallourn open cut mine until 1993.

Hazelwood Power Station was approved in 1959, and was to consist of six 200-megawatt (270,000 hp) generating units, giving a total of 1,200 MW of generating capacity. The first unit was to enter service in 1964, and the sixth in 1971. Growing electricity demand saw a review carried out by the SECV in 1963, with commissioning of the generating units moved forward to 1969. Additional capacity was provided when in 1965 two additional generating units at Hazelwood were approved, to be commissioned in 1970 and 1971 respectively.

Hazelwood relied on brown coal deposits from the nearby Morwell open cut mine. In 2003, the plant used 17.2 million tonnes (16,900,000 long tons; 19,000,000 short tons) of coal, while a further 1.6 million tonnes (1,600,000 long tons; 1,800,000 short tons) of coal was supplied from the Morwell mine to Morwell Power Station Energy Brix Australia 2.5 km North East of Hazelwood Power Station.

=== Privatisation ===
Hazelwood Power Station and associated mine were privatised by the Kennett government in 1996 after many years of downsizing under a 'structural efficiency' model undertaken by the then state Liberal government. It was sold for A$2.35 billion, and it operated as 'IPR-GDF SUEZ Hazelwood', an Australian public company, which was owned by United Kingdom company, International Power (91.8% share)- part of the GDF SUEZ group - and the Commonwealth Bank (the remaining 8.2%). The business office was near Morwell, 150 kilometres (93 mi) east of Melbourne. Prior to January 2011, IPR-GDF SUEZ Hazelwood had been known as International Power Hazelwood and Hazelwood Power before that.

After privatisation the new owners engaged in capital investment, with A$800 million invested in Hazelwood since 1996, such as replacement of boilers, rotors, turbines and the completion of an A$85 million project to reduce dust emissions by 80%. If Hazelwood had not been sold to private interests, activist groups say the SECV would have shut the station down in 2005.

=== EES approval ===
Before privatisation the power station was due to be decommissioned by the SECV by 2005, as had older plants at Newport and Yallourn. However, Hazelwood had its mining licence realigned by the Victorian Government along with EES approvals to move a river and a road on 6 September 2005. This agreement ensured security of coal supply to the plant until at least 2030 by allowing access to 43 million tonnes of brown coal deposits in a realignment of Hazelwood's mining licence boundaries that were originally set in 1996. Hazelwood returned over 160 million tonnes of coal to the State Government as part of that agreement.

The agreement required Hazelwood to reduce its estimated emissions by 34 million tonnes (33,000,000 long tons; 37,000,000 short tons) and capped its total greenhouse output at 445 million tonnes (438,000,000 long tons; 491,000,000 short tons) of carbon dioxide over its life, after which point it may have been made to cease operation. However, credits for investment in renewable energy and low emission technology were expected to allow the business to operate within the cap and extend its life. In spite of this, the station was still decommissioned.

Hazelwood's West Field development involved completing a new 7.5-kilometre (4.7 mi) section of the Strzelecki Highway, replacing over 10 kilometres (6.2 mi) of the Morwell River from an old concrete pipe into a natural open channel riverine setting, and acquiring privately owned land which was earmarked for future coal supply. Environment Victoria, Greenpeace and Australian Conservation Foundation opposed the development approvals, while business groups such as Minerals Council of Australia, VECCI, Aust Industry Group and Institute of Public Affairs welcomed the government's decision.

=== Closure and decommissioning ===
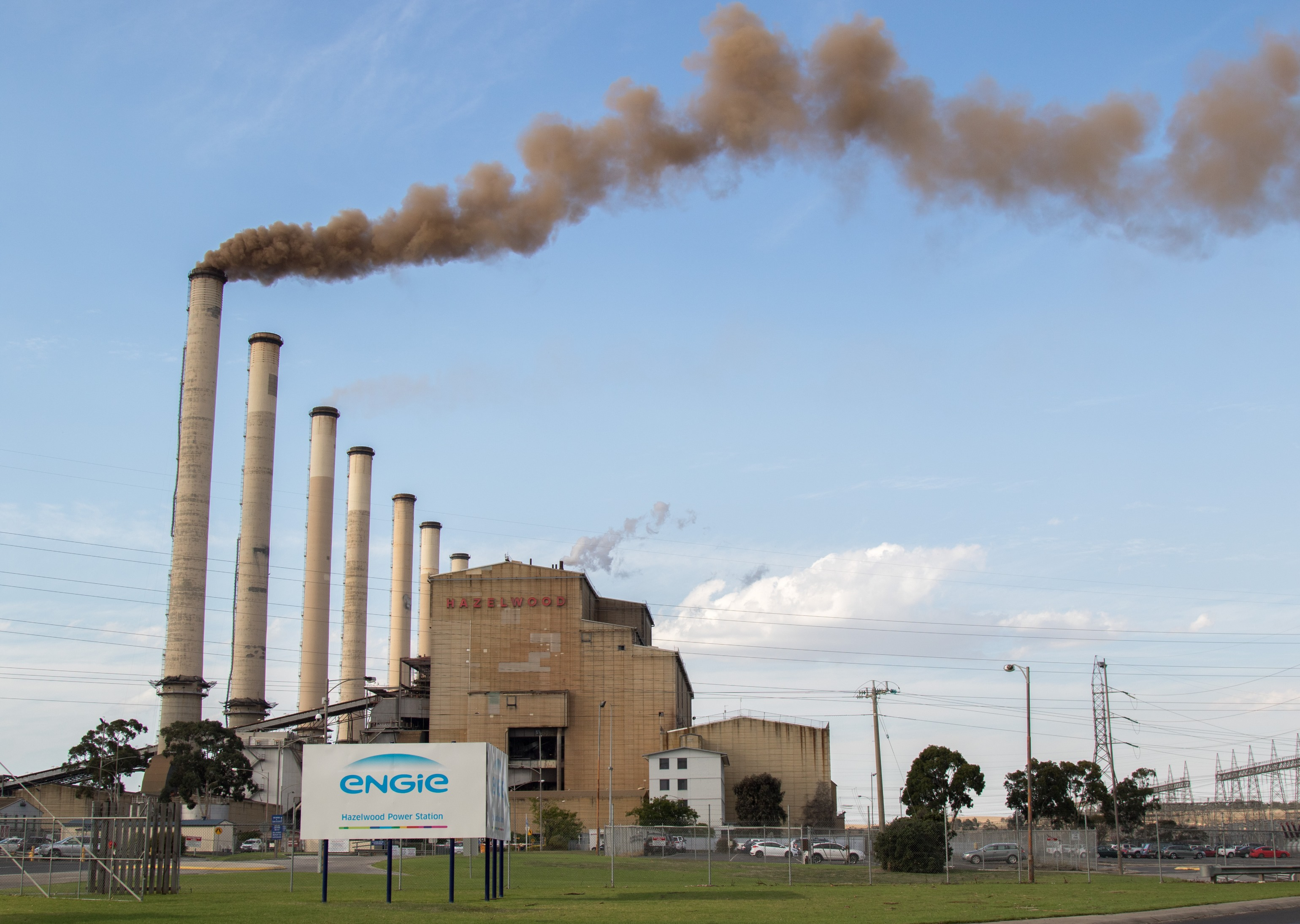
Hazelwood shutting down Unit 1 for the last time on 29 March 2017. The thick plume of smoke is caused by a combination of the electrostatic precipitators switching off automatically during the shut down to eliminate the risk of them igniting, and what's left of the auxiliary fuel (briquettes) stored on site being fed into the boiler to empty their stores.

Hazelwood's coal supply would likely have run out around 2009 without the 2005 coal mine extension. This extension, and the associated environmental impacts, have led to significant criticism by environmental groups, and civil disobedience actions (see below).

During 2011 and 2012, the Australian Government considered a Contract for Closure program to complement the Clean Energy Act policy. Hazelwood would likely have been closed under this program had it been pursued. However, this program was scrapped in September 2012 and no plants were closed.

On 3 November 2016, Engie announced that Hazelwood would be closed by the end of March 2017, citing the company's transformational policy of investing solely in low-carbon and renewable energy, as well lower energy prices and oversupply within Victoria. In May 2016, CEO Isabelle Kocher said the company was reviewing its remaining coal plants one by one and would close those with the most outdated technology.

The largest shareholder in Engie is the French government, which owns 33% of the company. The French Environment Minister said Engie would 'disengage' from Hazelwood power station during a documentary that aired on French TV in May 2016. The Minister's response came after receiving a petition about the Hazelwood mine fire from Environment Victoria.

The decommissioning and rehabilitation of the site is estimated to cost at least $743 million, six times the previously predicted amount. This includes $439 million to rehabilitate the mine, and $304 million to demolish the plant and restore the surrounding area. This is in addition to $324 million payable by the owners for redundancy and leave entitlements over the two years after closure, bringing the total cost of closing the plant to almost $1.1 billion.

In the lead up to the closure, there was insecurity around the numbers of Hazelwood workers Engie would keep employing in the decommissioning and rehabilitation processes, the redundancy packages offered, as well as the future of other workers and the local community in and around Morwell directly and indirectly impacted by the closure of the power station. At the time of Hazelwood's closure the power station directly employed 750 workers, comprising 450 permanent employees with an average age of 52 years and an average tenure of 25 years, and 300 contractors.

On 27 March 2017, units #8, #6 and #4 were permanently shut down, followed by units #2, #7 and #5 on 28 March 2017, and units #3 and #1 on 29 March 2017. Unit #1 was shut down last at 4.56pm. It was chosen to be last because Unit 1 was the first Hazelwood generating unit to come into operation on 30 November 1964. Decommissioning of mine and power station plant and equipment was expected to take 12 months.

In a press release on the subject of the closure, Engie in Australia's Chief Executive, Alex Keisser, acknowledged the contributions of past and present Hazelwood employees, and the role the power station has played in the Latrobe Valley. "While Friday will be the end of an era and a very sad day for everyone who has had an involvement with Hazelwood over the past 52 years, it should also be a very proud day," Keisser said. "The decision to close Hazelwood was extremely difficult and was made only after we investigated all options to keep the business open. While it was state-of-the-art when it opened in 1964, it has now reached the end of its productive life, lasting far longer than anyone would have anticipated when its life began. Our employees past and present, as well as contractors, local suppliers and businesses, and the broader Latrobe Valley community have all played their part in ensuring that Hazelwood has been a key player in the nation's electricity system over that time. Victoria should be very proud that Hazelwood has continued operating for more than 50 years, producing the electricity that has under-pinned the state's economic development and well-being."

The eight chimneys at the power station were demolished on 25 May 2020. Reclamation works are being undertaken at the site to restore it. Direct replacements for the electricity generation infrastructure that was on the site will not be built.

In 2022, a Victorian government inquiry into Hazelwood's closure found that the sudden withdrawal of such a large contributor to the Latrobe Valley's economic output was deeply felt by the region.

A 2.5 GWh grid battery is planned for 2029.

== Environmental impacts ==
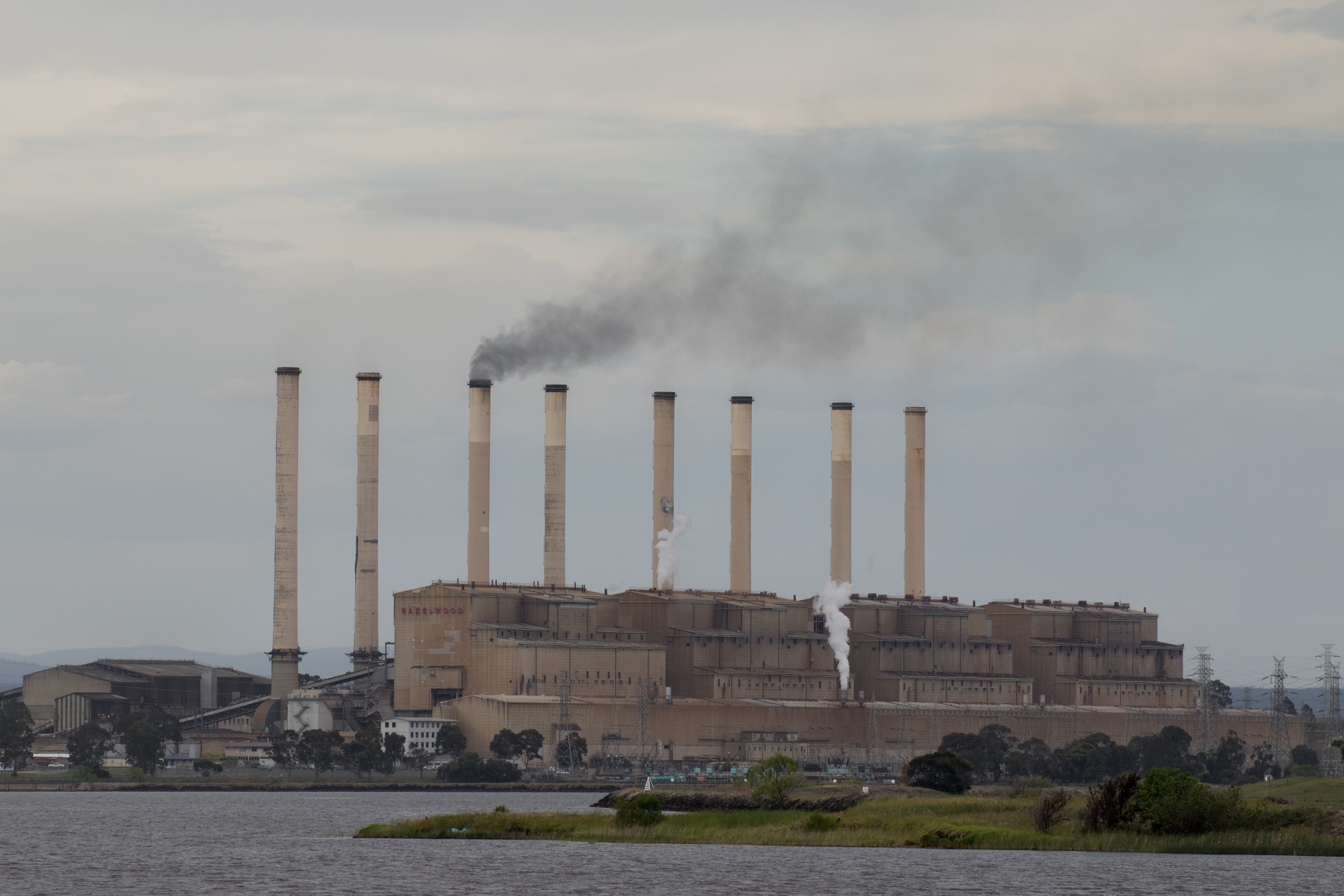
Unit number three is coming back online following a shut down, resulting in a plume of visible smoke due to the electrostatic precipitators being offline for the duration of the start-up.

=== CO_{2} emissions ===
The station was listed as the least carbon efficient power station in the OECD nations in a 2005 report by WWF Australia. The WWF reported that the power station produced 1.58 tonnes (1.56 long tons; 1.74 short tons) of CO_{2} per megawatt-hour of electricity generated in 2004 (official result was 1.55), which was a reduction of 6.6% from the 1996 levels of 1.66 Mt/TWh when the plant was privatised. This is still 50% more polluting than the average black coal power station in NSW or Queensland.

Hazelwood emitted up to 15% of Victoria's annual greenhouse gas emissions and 3% of Australia's greenhouse gas emissions before closure.

With a 60% increase in power generation since 1996, Hazelwood averaged up to 16 million tonnes (16,000,000 long tons; 18,000,000 short tons) of carbon dioxide each year and, after Loy Yang A Power station, was the second highest emitter in the Latrobe Valley until 2015.

Hazelwood had been the site of two carbon capture trials to lower its CO_{2} emissions (see below).

In late 2008, International Power stated the financial viability of the power station would be in question under a greenhouse gas emissions trading scheme (ETS), unless the company received significant compensation.

=== Water usage ===
In 2005, 1.31 megalitres (46×10^{3} cu ft) of water was consumed per 1 gigawatt-hour (3.6 TJ) of power generated. Cooling water for the power station was supplied by the Hazelwood Pondage, built for this purpose in the 1960s. The pondage is supplied with water from the Moondarra Reservoir and runoff pumped from the adjacent mine. Within the mine, water was sprayed onto the coal surfaces to reduce the chance of fire and to suppress fugitive dust.

Public access to the pondage for sailing, boating and other recreational water sports is permitted. Cichlids and other tropical fish that were released into the lake by the public have established populations, including Convict cichlids (Cryptoheros nigrofasciatus) and the African cichlid spotted tilapia (Tilapia mariae). Other fish include carp, goldfish (Carassius auratus), Gambusia (Gambusia holbrooki), and the native short-finned eel (Anguilla australis) and Australian smelt (Retropinna semoni).

=== Pollutants ===
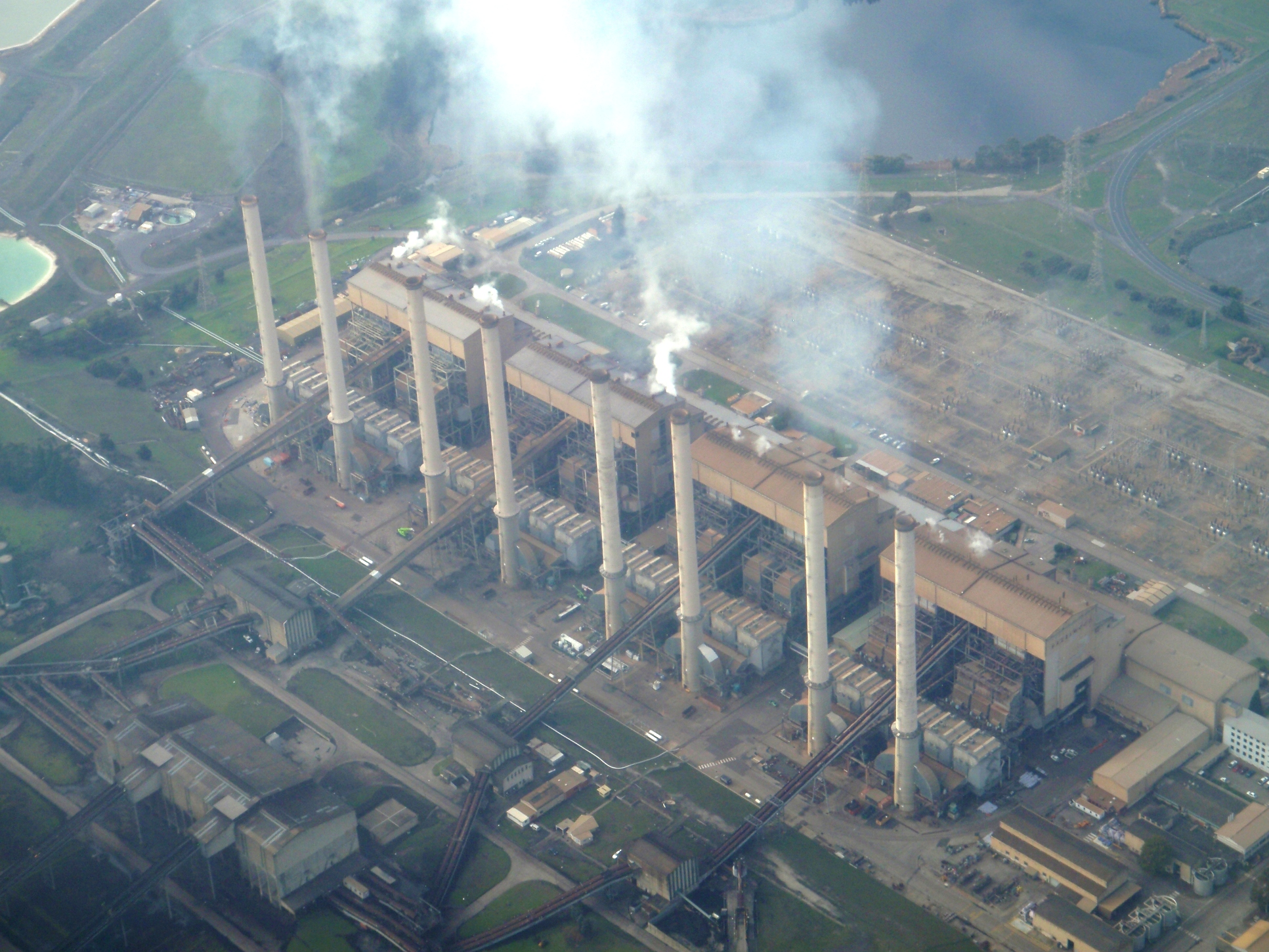
Hazelwood Power Station as seen from an aircraft in 2009.

In a 2007-2008 report, the National Pollutant Inventory (NPI) rated the power station's polychlorinated dioxins and furans as "high 100", hydrochloric acid as "high 87", oxides of nitrogen as "medium 57", particulate matter 2.5 μm as "low 21", and boron & compounds as "low 15".

The 2005-2006 NPI data showed that Hazelwood released 100 tonnes (98 long tons; 110 short tons) of boron and compounds into the air and 5.2 tonnes (5.1 long tons; 5.7 short tons) into water. Also released into the air: 7,700 tonnes (7,600 long tons; 8,500 short tons) hydrochloric acid, 2,700 tonnes (2,700 long tons; 3,000 short tons) of oxides of nitrogen, 2,900 tonnes (2,900 long tons; 3,200 short tons) of particulate matter 10 μm, and 15 grams (0.53 oz) of polychlorinated dioxins and furans. Many pollutants are not measured.

Air pollution from the normal operations of Hazelwood alone had been estimated to kill at least 18 people a year in Gippsland, and make many more people sick. The Greenpeace report attributed 37 deaths in the south-east Gippsland region to pollution from coal plants, with almost half of those in the Latrobe Valley. The estimated annual health burden on the community of Hazelwood's air pollution was $100 million each year, calculated using methodology developed by the US National Academy of Sciences.

=== Coal mine fire ===
A fire, commonly referred to as the Hazelwood Coal Mine Fire, started at the mine on 9 February 2014 and was officially considered controlled on 10 March 2014. The Chief Officer of the Country Fire Authority described the fire as "one of the largest, longest running and most complex fires in the State's history."

Thousands of residents in nearby towns were affected by smoke and ash from the fire. On 28 February the Chief Health Officer of Victoria advised the vulnerable groups of people in Morwell South to temporarily relocate due to the danger of PM2.5 particles. Power lines and connectors at the Morwell substation were washed for ash buildup to reduce the risk of short circuiting. Tim Flannery questioned whether GDF Suez was taking sufficient action to keep the community informed and said the fire highlighted the need for better preparation and inquiry into the state of mines around the country, and the risks they posed to nearby communities. On 11 March 2014, Premier Dennis Napthine announced a judicial inquiry into the circumstances and impacts of the fire.

The Hazelwood Mine Fire Inquiry Report was published in 2016 and stated that the community has experienced adverse health effects and may be affected for an indeterminate period into the future. The inquiry found that 11 premature deaths were attributed to the mine fire. Many people and local businesses have experienced financial impacts for a range of reasons including a downturn in business, medical costs, veterinary costs, time taken off work, relocation from their homes, cleaning their homes and businesses, and possible decreases in property value. The Board estimated the total cost borne by the Victorian Government, the local community and the operator of the Hazelwood mine, GDF Suez, to exceed $100 million.

In July 2015, Hazelwood owners GDF Suez announced that the company would refuse to pay the 18 million dollar bill for fighting the fire presented by the Country Fire Authority. According to a statement released by the company, the firefighting effort should be provided to it at no further charge as it had already paid routine taxes and levies in previous years, although the inquiry identified that the areas of the mine which burned were unrehabilitated, whereas rehabilitated areas did not catch fire.

In May 2020 the Hazelwood Power Corporation was fined $1.56 million fine for occupational health and safety breaches associated with the fire.

== Asbestos ==
The rate of pleural and peritoneal mesothelioma among power industry workers was found to be seven times the national average. (Victorian State Government study, 2001). Latrobe Valley power industry workers die 15 years younger than the national average.

The power stations of the Latrobe Valley used asbestos widely in their construction and in the maintenance of the power plant. The substance was banned in Victoria in 2003. However, it's estimated that 146,000 employees and contractors, who worked in SEC plants from 1921 to the 1980s, were exposed to it. Between 1976 and 2008, $52.6 million has been paid to former SEC employees by the State Government insurance authority, and a further $369 million is expected to be paid out by the Victorian Managed Insurance Authority to former employees.

In June 2010, EPA confirmed it was investigating reports asbestos could be in one of Hazelwood's smoke stacks. A former worker claims to have lost his job after speaking out about asbestos at a health and safety meeting. Speaking to The Express newspaper he said, "It is not just in the stacks, it's everywhere, the place is riddled with it, Hazelwood has no duty of care to its workers or the public." Another worker, trained in asbestos identification, said for years Hazelwood management had ignored workers' concerns. International Power Hazelwood spokesperson Neil Lawson has responded, "It is well documented that there is still an amount of contained asbestos material which, if required, is being progressively and safely removed by specialised licensed contractors during major plant outages and maintenance activities." The same newspaper subsequently reported comments by EPA that the Hazelwood business had no case to answer and that asbestos fibres were not present in its smokestacks.

== Criticisms and responses ==
The Australian Conservation Foundation has put the A$400 million 2005 Hazelwood expansion in context by comparing it to Victoria's five-star energy efficient homes standard, which is expected to save 200,000 tonnes (200,000 long tons; 220,000 short tons) of greenhouse gases per annum. The ACF reasons that Hazelwood's operations would cancel out that benefit every four days. Former ACF Executive director Don Henry said he would follow formal objections with legal action to prevent the grant of 'new' coal to IPRH. Most of the West Field coal reserves were allocated to Hazelwood in 1996 in the privatisation process. The ACF did not mount any legal objection to Hazelwood's allocated coal reserves.

Environment Victoria had been campaigning for the closure of Hazelwood power station since 2005 and has pushed for alternative baseload generation through: biomass energy, wave energy, geothermal energy, new combined cycle gas fired generation plants, new cogeneration facilities, or increased imports of baseload electricity from interstate. In January 2005, the Clean Energy Future Group together with Environment Victoria released the report "Toward Victoria's Clean Energy Future", a plan to cut Victoria's Greenhouse gas emissions from electricity by 2010. It largely focused on cleaner alternatives to Hazelwood, and warned that continued support of coal-fired power development would lock the State into CO_{2} emissions that would dwarf any current proposed measures for reducing emissions. Following the 2014 Hazelwood mine fire, Environment Victoria worked with locals in the Latrobe Valley to ensure national attention to the pollution disaster by generating media coverage and urging an inquiry into the fire; releasing a report by Harvard University researchers about the hidden health costs of Hazelwood; appearing at both inquiries, cross-examining both government regulators and ENGIE executives and ensuring mine rehabilitation was on the agenda; and petitioning the mine owner to pay its firefighting bill to the Country Fire Authority. It afterwards entered into a campaign to improve coal mine rehabilitation efforts in Victoria and to ensure that mine rehabilitation bonds cover the actual costs of rehabilitation. in 2015, it started a petition signed by thousands of Victorians to call on the French government to phase out Hazelwood. In May 2016 the petition postcards were handed to French Environment Minister Segolene Royale on TV, which led to her response announcement that ENGIE would disengage from Hazelwood. Environment Victoria currently closely follows the Hazelwood closure process, engaging with LaTrobe Valley communities and campaigning for a just transition for the Valley.

Greenpeace has pushed for a target of 20% clean energy for Victoria by 2020, expecting Hazelwood to have been retired, and to invigorate the Latrobe Valley as a clean energy hub.

In June 2009, an anonymous letter purporting to come from the Earth Liberation Front was sent to the home of the CEO of the power station, Graeme York. The letter threatened to harm property, but did not threaten physical harm against any individuals or animals, despite being portrayed as such in commercial media due to the ELF activities overseas. ELF media spokesperson Jason Crawford defended the letter, but was unable to confirm that it had been sent by his organisation. The ELF letter was publicly condemned by Greenpeace, whose activists had engaged in nonviolent direct action at the plant six weeks earlier.

In late 2009, in response to the "Switch Off Hazelwood—Switch on Renewables" protests, the State of Victoria introduced penalties of one years' imprisonment for trespass, and two years' imprisonment for damaging, interfering, tampering, or attaching something to electricity infrastructure. This was legislated in the Electricity Industry Amendment (Critical Infrastructure) Act 2009 (Vic). The legislation has been welcomed by the power industry but criticised by green groups for supposedly criminalising non-violent civil disobedience, and has been compared to the lockdown powers of the Major Events Act 2009, which has been reportedly used to intimidate and disperse peaceful protesters in NSW.

== Protest and civil disobedience at Hazelwood ==
On 11 August 2005 approximately 50 student environmentalists and Greenpeace volunteers unfurled a "Quit Coal" banner outside the plant while 12 activists occupied the brown coal pit, with two locking themselves to coal dredging equipment. This action drew worldwide attention to Hazelwood's CO_{2} emissions and their harmful impacts on the global climate.

On 6 November 2008 a group of seven people protesting against Australia's inaction on climate change walked onto the site of the Hazelwood power station and temporarily stopped one conveyor belt which carries coal from the mine to the power station. No production was lost due to adequate reserve bunker stocks of coal.

On 28 March 2009, a group of around 30 people took part in a rally at the power station ahead of the 2009 Earth Hour. Two protesters chained themselves to a conveyor belt, briefly disrupting the supply of coal between the Hazelwood mine and the power plant. Again, electricity production was not disrupted from the power station despite large community outcry against the plant's operations. Three people were charged by Victoria Police for unspecified reasons. On 21 May 2009, 14 Greenpeace members illegally entered the site and thought they had temporarily shut down coal production after chaining themselves to an excavator. That 'excavator' was out for routine maintenance and again, no production from either mine or station was lost. All seven were later charged by Victoria Police.

=== September 2009 rally ===
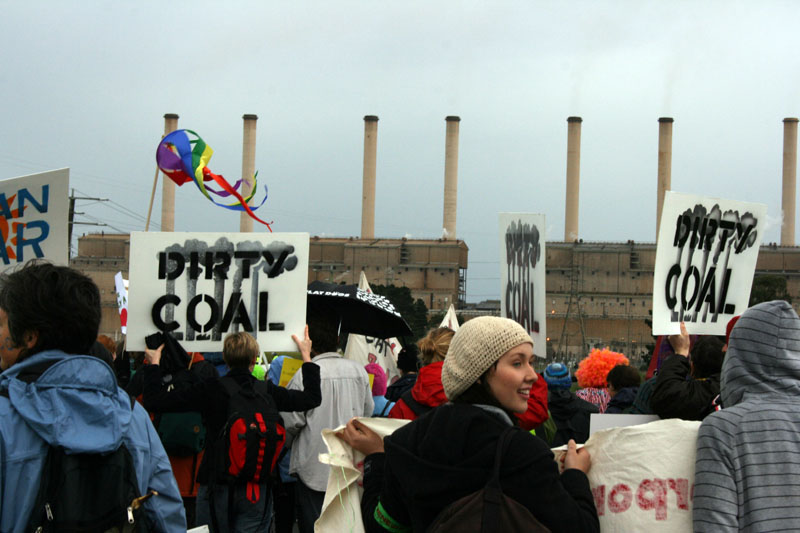
500 people symbolically decommissioned the developed world's dirtiest power station at the "Switch off coal, switch on renewables" event in September 2009.

A large mass civil disobedience rally, the largest of its kind at any Australian power station, was undertaken by a network of organisations under the banner Switch Off Hazelwood. On 13 September 2009, an estimated 500 people participated in near freezing conditions, with many camping nearby on the previous night on Hazelwood's own property beside the pondage. The rally was supported by organisations and groups including the Australian Conservation Foundation, Environment Victoria and the Australian Greens. Many of the participants were families and many were professional activists from Melbourne and interstate. In the week before the rally, a community meeting entitled "Clean energy or coal: What future for Latrobe jobs?" was held in the nearby town of Morwell. A large number of Hazelwood employees turned up to engage the protest organisers in a spirited debate about the reality of local jobs.

Organisers liaised with Victoria Police prior to and during the demonstration and publicly declared intentions to undertake "peaceful civil disobedience" by entering the grounds of the power station to place symbolic decommission notices on the plant building. The organisers also distributed guidelines asking participants to use "peaceful protest tactics" and held a number of training sessions on civil disobedience and nonviolence prior to the event. The company responded by installing a temporary perimeter fence around the plant, with police helicopters and mounted police patrolling the site on Saturday evening. On the Sunday, police contingencies included a large number of officers on foot deployed within the perimeter fence. Many were issued with handheld video recorders and digital cameras and filmed people attending the rally. Police also deployed personnel in dingies in adjacent pondage lakes. A large number of activists also deployed video recording during the day. The rally began at 11am with speeches from Australian Greens Scott Ludlam, Dave Sweeney from the Australian Conservation Foundation, author David Spratt and Melbourne based paediatrician Merryn Redenbach, amongst others, with several speakers stressing that protesters had no argument with police or plant workers and emphasising the organising group's calls for new wind turbine, solar water and insulation manufacturing capacity to be developed in the Latrobe Valley. The group then marched to the front of the power station, where several participants, including some dressed in mock Carbon Police outfits, climbed temporary fencing in an attempt to issue a "Community Decommission Order" to the power station.

Part of the crowd advanced on the temporary fencing and some participants and police clashed. 22 people were arrested during the rally, many for illegally trespassing on Hazelwood property after climbing the temporary fence. One person was also charged with assault after a police officer was allegedly "thrown backwards" while trying to stop a protester who was running towards the plant gates after scaling a temporary fence. Many protesters were officially charged and subsequently were recipients of diversion orders and various 'fines'. Many were able to donate their fines to charities of their choice which in some cases included their own activist groups. Supporters of the protest said that nonviolent direct action and civil disobedience was necessary because other avenues to achieve change, such as petitions, letters, rallies and community meetings, had been explored and exhausted. Environment groups had also lodged application to have the impact of greenhouse gas emissions considered in the Environmental Effects Statement which approved the access to Hazelwood's own coal fields in 2005.

The rally was featured in the main group of lead items on every Victorian television and radio news broadcast that same evening, and in Newspapers the following morning. Hazelwood had subsequently installed permanent fencing marking its property boundary.

=== October 2010 rally ===
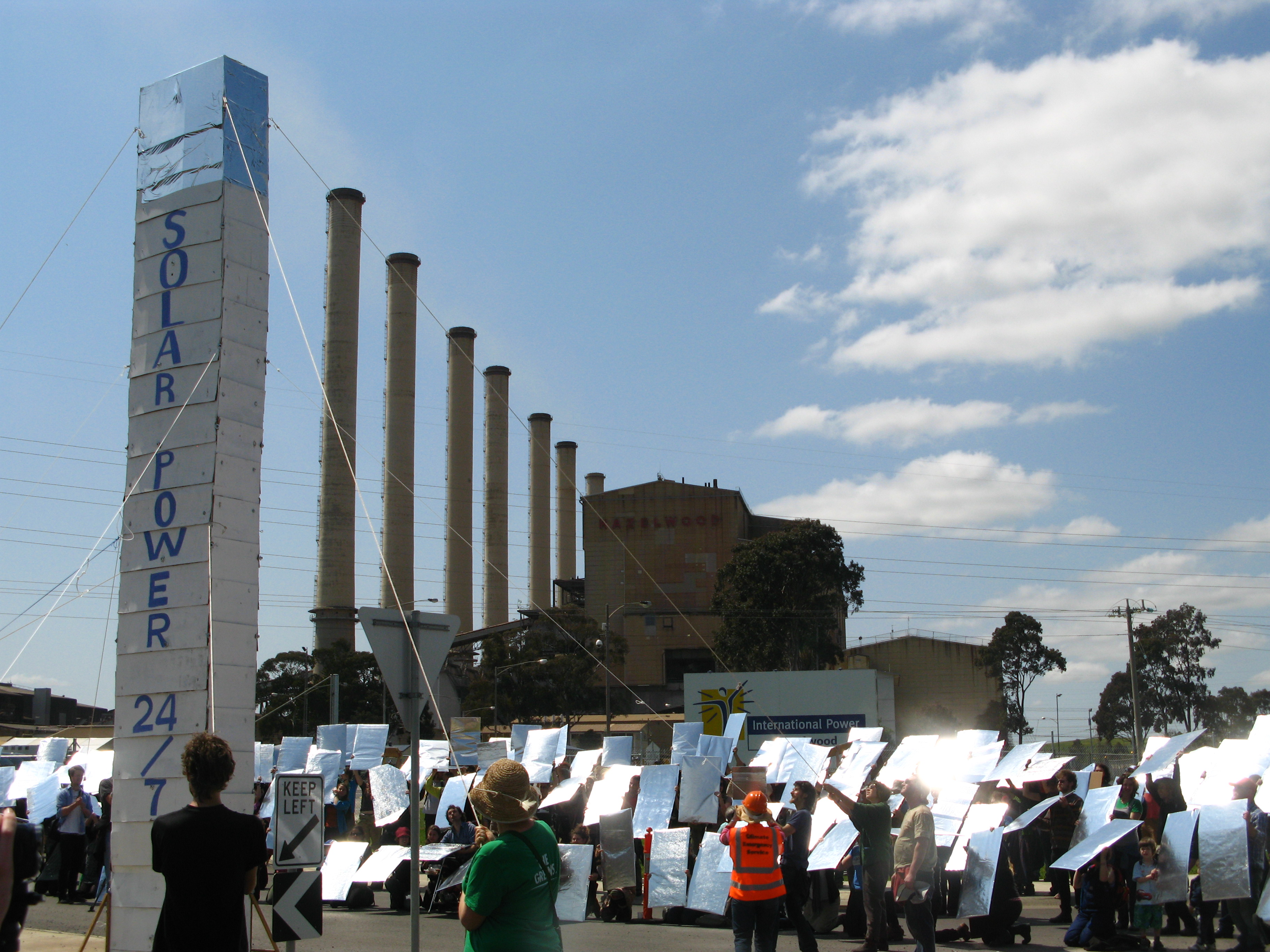
The replica Solar Thermal plant at the 2010 rally.

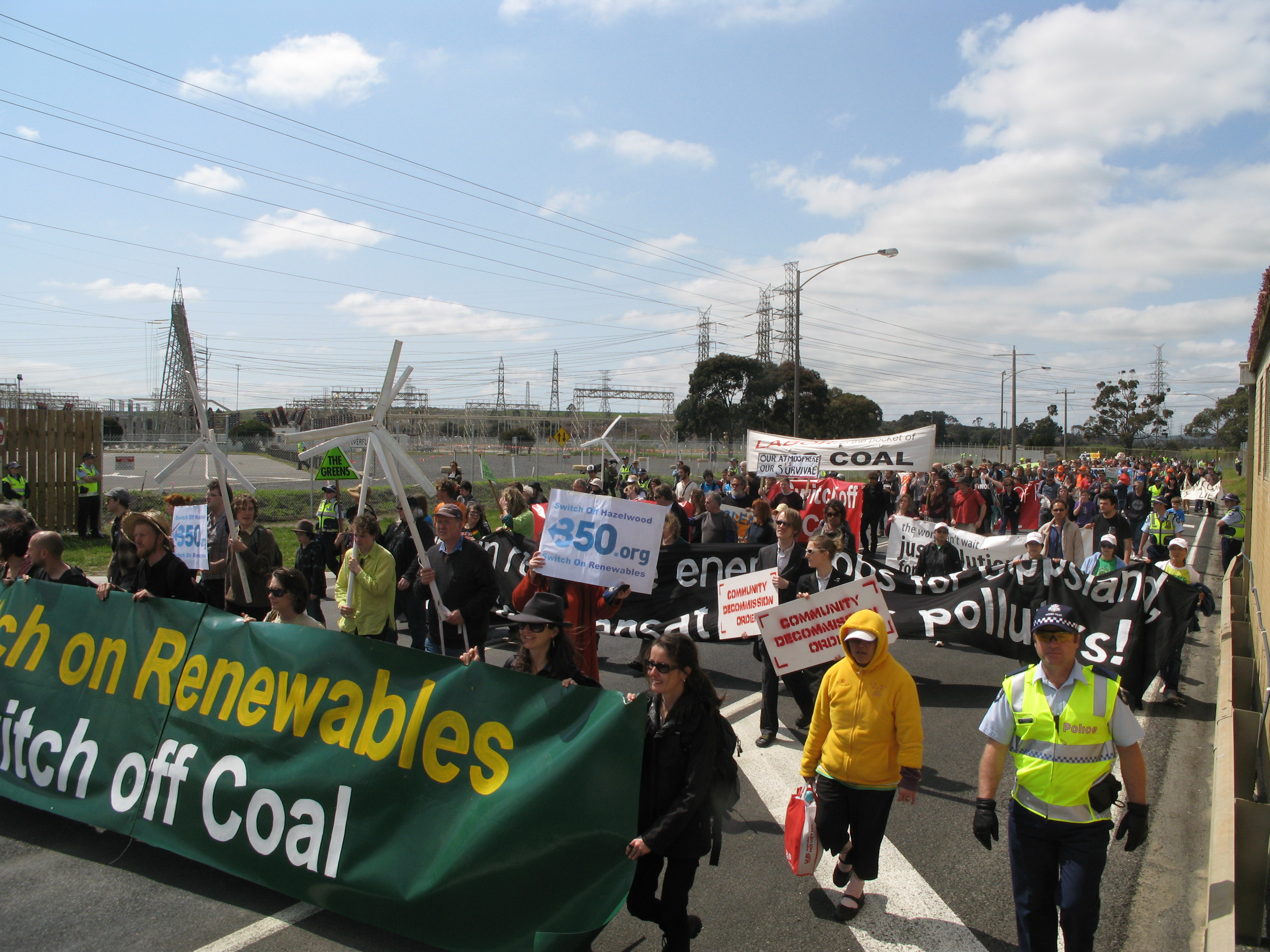
150 attendees - most from Melbourne - marched to the station on the International Day of Climate Action, 10 October 2010.

Another rally took place at the station at 11am on 10 October 2010. Approximately 150 people attended, protesters were well behaved and there were no arrests., most travelling on the train from Melbourne. The rally coincided with the International Day of Climate Action. There were two training sessions held prior to the rally for participants in non-violent direct action, these occurred 18 September and 2 October at Trades Hall, Melbourne. In preparation for the rally, around 250 Police officers were stationed around the perimeter of the station. The Hazelwood business had erected several kilometres of permanent fencing in contrast to the previous year's rally, before which only temporary fencing was erected. The march caused local roads to be closed to the disruption of local community. The march to the station began at 11am and upon reaching the station's entrance, participants heard speeches from several speakers including Australian Greens Eastern Victorian upper house candidate Samantha Dunn and Beyond Zero Emissions' Mark Ogge, with Rod Quantock as the MC. Protesters were not allowed access beyond the road reserve outside the station itself. Following speeches, participants then built the largest ever replica Solar Thermal plant.

=== ASIO surveillance of protestors ===
In 2012 the media revealed that ASIO had been increasing its activity in monitoring anti-coal protestors. Minister Martin Ferguson named the Hazelwood power station as a focus of key concern. The surveillance measures were described as "intolerable" by then Australian Greens leader, Bob Brown.

== Carbon capture trials ==
A two-year pilot trial of an algae photobioreactor was undertaken at Hazelwood in the early 2000s by Energetix, a division of the Victor Smorgon Group. The apparatus housed algae that feed on emissions from the smoke stacks, which were then harvested and turned into biofuels. The technology Hazelwood used was developed at MIT and was licensed from Greenfuels. The trial was successful and has now concluded. However, the technology was found not to be commercially viable and was not pursued further.

In July 2009, International Power opened a carbon capture and storage demonstration plant at Hazelwood. The process takes emissions from the power station smoke stacks, extracts CO_{2} and uses a chemical process to turn it into calcium carbonate. The resulting solid can then be stored above ground or sold to industry. The trial facility captured 25 tonnes or 0.05% of daily emissions from the plant, and had the possibility to scale up to 50 tonnes per day.

== Gallery ==
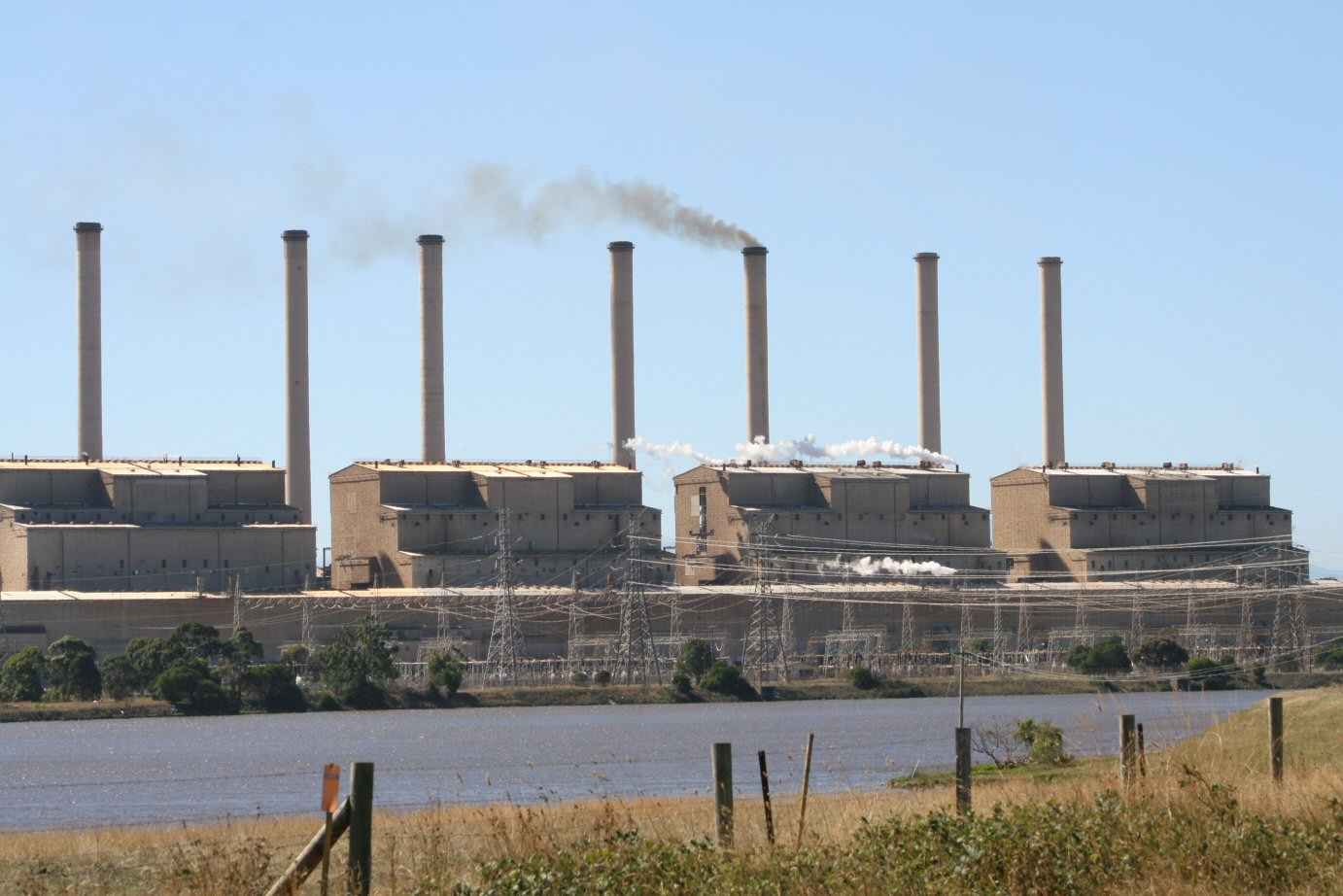
Unit 6 starting up after a shut down, March 2008

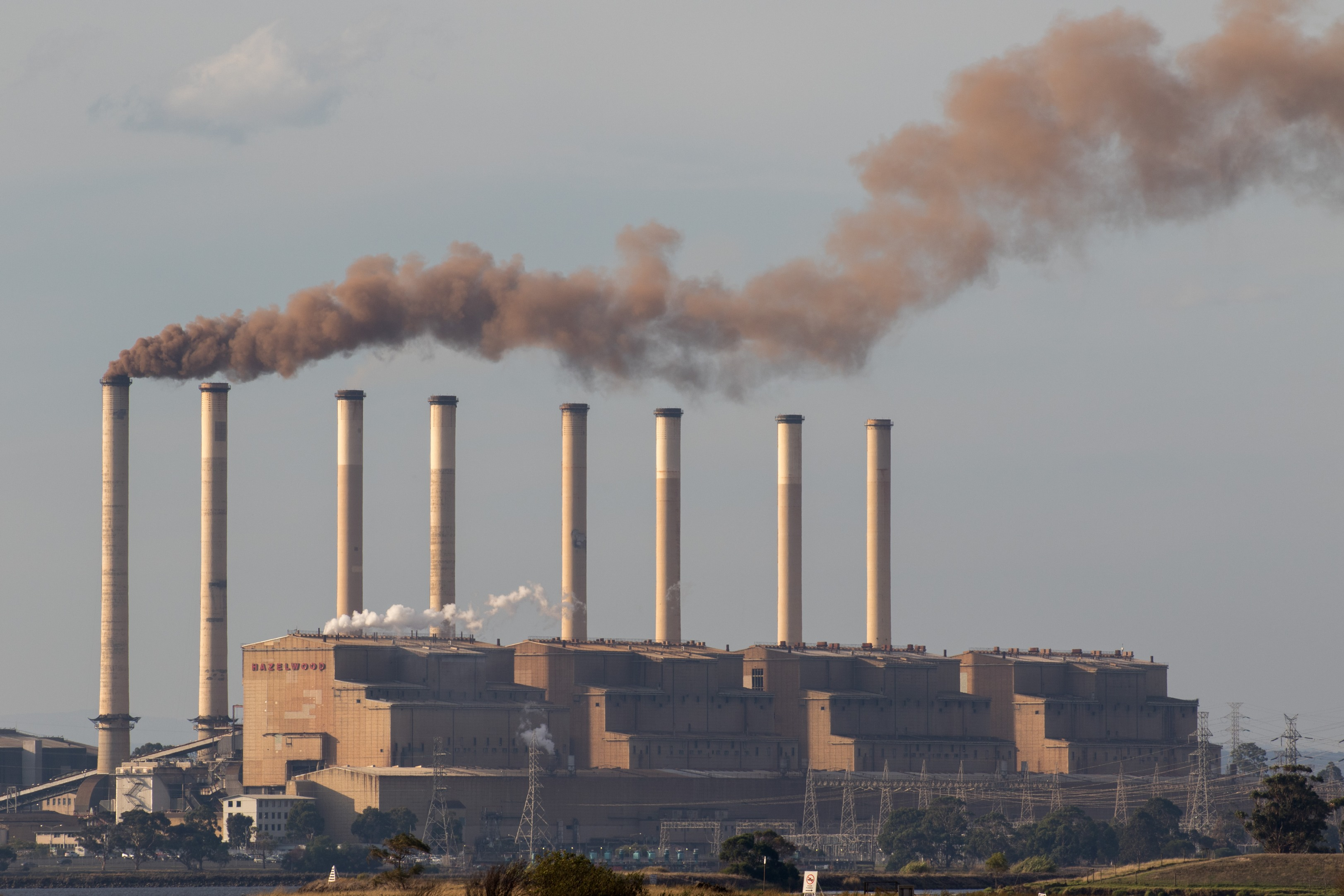
Unit 1 shutting down for the closure of Hazelwood, 29 March 2017

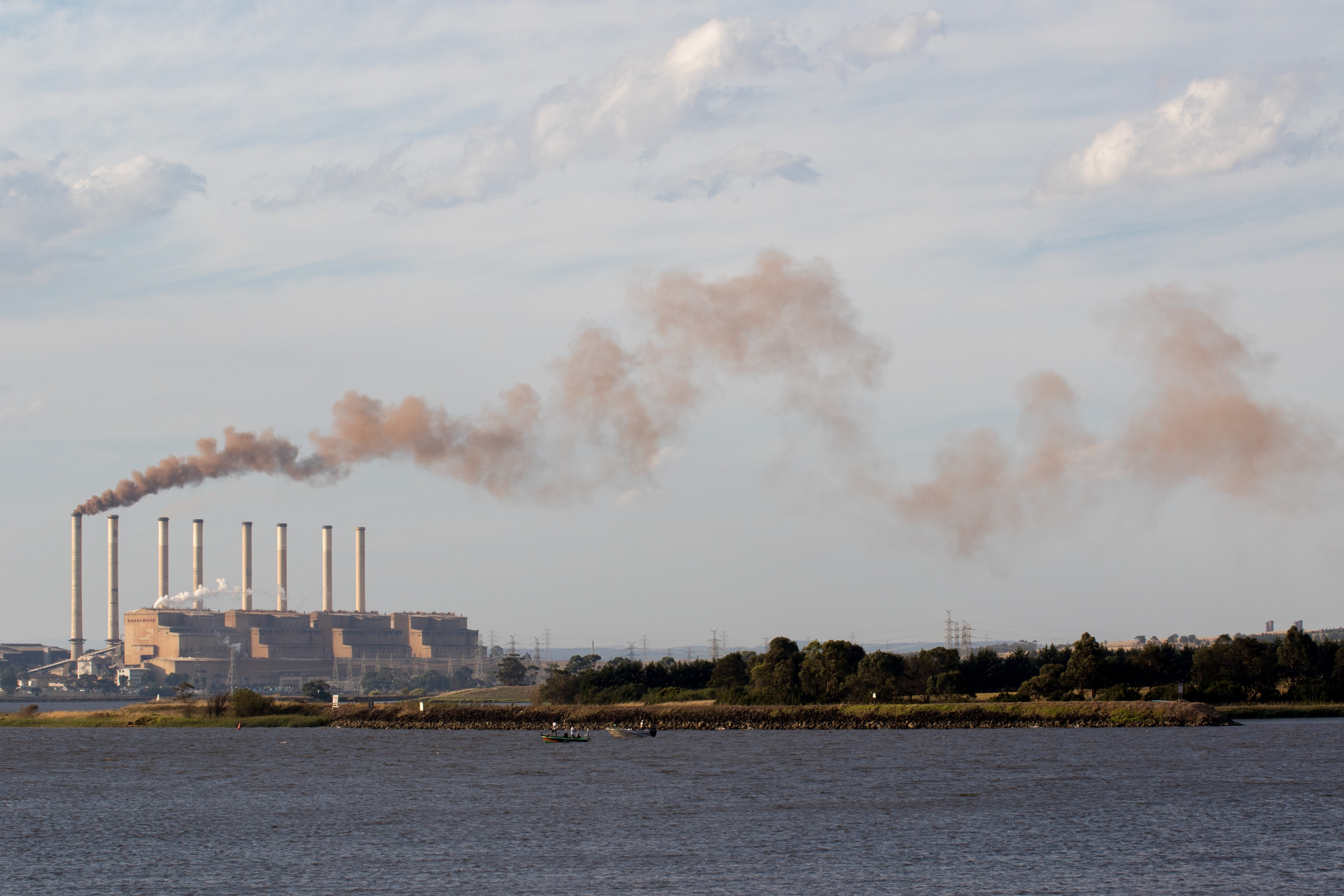
Smoke plume seen from across the Hazelwood pondage

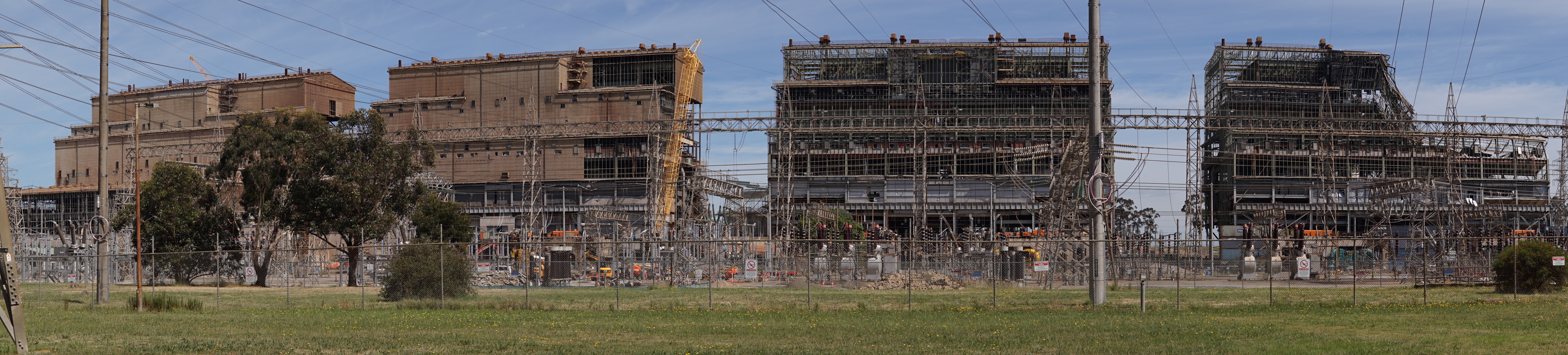
Demolition of Hazelwood Power Station 30 November 2020
