= Latrobe Valley =

- Region
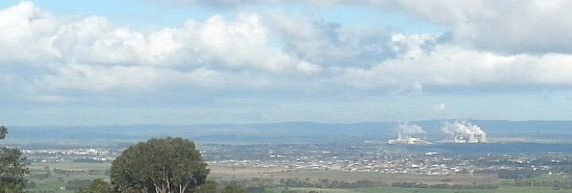
- A view of part of the Latrobe Valley, from Tyers lookout, 2013. Approximate Latrobe Valley area, comprising the Baw Baw Shire and City of Latrobe local government areas.

- Coordinates: 38°10′50″S 146°16′42″E
- Country: Australia
- State: Victoria
- Region: Gippsland
- LGAs: Latrobe City; Shire of Baw Baw

Government
  - State electorates: Gippsland South; Morwell; Narracan
  - Federal division: Gippsland Monash

Population
  - Total: 125,000
- Mean max temp: 26.4 °C (79.5 °F)
- Mean min temp: 3.6 °C (38.5 °F)
- Annual rainfall: 800 mm (31 in)
Regions around Latrobe Valley
Great Dividing Range	Baw Baw Ranges	East Gippsland
West Gippsland	Latrobe Valley	East Gippsland
Strzelecki Ranges	South Gippsland	Central Gippsland

The Latrobe Valley is an inland geographical district and urban area of the Gippsland region in the state of Victoria, Australia. The traditional owners are the Brayakaulung of the Gunai nation. The district lies east of Melbourne and nestled between the Strzelecki Ranges to the south and the Baw Baw Ranges, part of the Great Dividing Range, to the north. Mount St Phillack (1,567 m (5,141 ft)) is the highest peak to the north of the Latrobe Valley, due north of Moe. The highest peak to the south is Mt Tassie (740 m (2,430 ft)), south of Traralgon.

The area has three major centres, from west to east, Moe, Morwell and Traralgon, with minor centres including Churchill, Yinnar, Glengarry, and Tyers. The population of the Latrobe Valley is approximately 125,000.

The valley draws its name from the Latrobe River which flows eastward, through the valley. According to Les Blake, in 1841 William Adams Brodribb, an early European settler, named the river in honour of Charles La Trobe, Lieutenant Governor of the Port Phillip District. A. W. Reed also attributes Brodribb to naming the river in honour of La Trobe; yet Reed claims that the river was discovered by Angus McMillan in 1840 who named the watercourse as Glengarry River.

== Geography ==
While the Latrobe River flows into Lake Wellington to the east of Sale and includes in its drainage basin a significant part of central Gippsland, the region conventionally known as the Latrobe Valley occupies an inland area between the Strzelecki Ranges and Baw Baw Ranges between Drouin and Rosedale – with three major urban areas Moe, Morwell and Traralgon, between the Strzelecki Ranges to the south and the westernmost reaches of the Victorian Alps to the north.

== Climate ==
It has a temperate climate meaning mild temperatures with large amounts of rain, the occasional frost and snow on neighbouring hills. February is the warmest month in the Latrobe Valley with an average temperature range of 12.5 to 26.4 °C (54.5 to 79.5 °F) and the coldest month is July with an average temperature range of 3.6 to 13.5 °C (38.5 to 56.3 °F). The most rain occurs in late winter and spring, and average yearly rainfall is approximately 800 millimetres (31 in).

Climate data for Morwell (Latrobe Valley Airport, 1984–2020); 56 m AMSL; 38.21° S, 146.47° E
Month	Jan	Feb	Mar	Apr	May	Jun	Jul	Aug	Sep	Oct	Nov	Dec	Year
Record high °C (°F)	45.1 (113.2)	46.3 (115.3)	40.4 (104.7)	35.0 (95.0)	26.7 (80.1)	23.5 (74.3)	21.8 (71.2)	26.8 (80.2)	31.0 (87.8)	35.1 (95.2)	38.6 (101.5)	42.2 (108.0)	46.3 (115.3)
Mean daily maximum °C (°F)	26.2 (79.2)	26.5 (79.7)	24.4 (75.9)	20.5 (68.9)	16.9 (62.4)	14.2 (57.6)	13.6 (56.5)	14.9 (58.8)	16.9 (62.4)	19.3 (66.7)	21.6 (70.9)	24.0 (75.2)	19.9 (67.8)
Mean daily minimum °C (°F)	12.5 (54.5)	12.7 (54.9)	11.1 (52.0)	8.5 (47.3)	6.6 (43.9)	4.4 (39.9)	3.7 (38.7)	4.3 (39.7)	5.8 (42.4)	7.4 (45.3)	9.4 (48.9)	11.1 (52.0)	8.1 (46.6)
Record low °C (°F)	1.8 (35.2)	1.9 (35.4)	1.9 (35.4)	−0.5 (31.1)	−2.6 (27.3)	−3.6 (25.5)	−4.8 (23.4)	−3.4 (25.9)	−2.1 (28.2)	−2.3 (27.9)	0.6 (33.1)	1.7 (35.1)	−4.8 (23.4)
Average precipitation mm (inches)	50.1 (1.97)	39.2 (1.54)	43.9 (1.73)	57.1 (2.25)	51.6 (2.03)	58.4 (2.30)	66.4 (2.61)	62.9 (2.48)	78.4 (3.09)	72.8 (2.87)	75.0 (2.95)	68.6 (2.70)	724.4 (28.52)
Average precipitation days (≥ 0.2 mm)	9.5	8.7	10.9	13.1	15.7	18.3	19.1	19.0	16.9	14.8	13.3	12.1	171.4
Average afternoon relative humidity (%)	46	46	48	55	64	68	67	61	59	56	54	49	56

Temperatures on Mount Baw Baw, to the north of Moe, generally peak around 10 to 12 °C (18 to 22 °F) cooler than the major urban areas during the day.

Climate data for Mount Baw Baw (1997–2022); 1,561 m AMSL; 37.84° S, 146.27° E
Month	Jan	Feb	Mar	Apr	May	Jun	Jul	Aug	Sep	Oct	Nov	Dec	Year
Record high °C (°F)	30.9 (87.6)	31.3 (88.3)	26.2 (79.2)	20.6 (69.1)	16.2 (61.2)	12.6 (54.7)	10.0 (50.0)	13.1 (55.6)	16.6 (61.9)	21.2 (70.2)	26.0 (78.8)	27.7 (81.9)	31.3 (88.3)
Mean daily maximum °C (°F)	17.6 (63.7)	16.4 (61.5)	13.9 (57.0)	10.0 (50.0)	6.4 (43.5)	3.5 (38.3)	2.2 (36.0)	2.9 (37.2)	5.7 (42.3)	8.9 (48.0)	12.3 (54.1)	14.7 (58.5)	9.5 (49.2)
Mean daily minimum °C (°F)	8.8 (47.8)	8.1 (46.6)	6.3 (43.3)	3.9 (39.0)	1.5 (34.7)	−0.6 (30.9)	−1.6 (29.1)	−1.5 (29.3)	−0.2 (31.6)	1.7 (35.1)	4.2 (39.6)	5.9 (42.6)	3.0 (37.5)
Record low °C (°F)	−2.0 (28.4)	−1.0 (30.2)	−2.2 (28.0)	−5.7 (21.7)	−5.0 (23.0)	−7.0 (19.4)	−6.6 (20.1)	−8.5 (16.7)	−6.3 (20.7)	−6.4 (20.5)	−4.5 (23.9)	−3.1 (26.4)	−8.5 (16.7)
Average precipitation mm (inches)	93.9 (3.70)	94.8 (3.73)	107.5 (4.23)	137.8 (5.43)	122.6 (4.83)	151.2 (5.95)	162.7 (6.41)	181.2 (7.13)	161.9 (6.37)	152.4 (6.00)	164.6 (6.48)	136.5 (5.37)	1,797.2 (70.76)
Average precipitation days (≥ 0.2 mm)	12.3	11.9	13.8	14.9	15.3	15.7	19.5	19.9	16.0	17.0	15.8	14.6	186.7
Average afternoon relative humidity (%)	71	73	75	81	83	88	89	87	85	82	77	73	80
Source: Australian Bureau of Meteorology; Mount Baw Baw

== Demographics ==
There are three major population centres in the Latrobe Valley, all located within the City of Latrobe local government area:

- Moe – west Latrobe Valley
- Morwell – central Latrobe Valley
- Traralgon – eastern Latrobe Valley

The primary hospital is the Latrobe Regional Hospital located on the Princes Highway in Traralgon.

Smaller towns are Tyers, Newborough, Yinnar, Yallourn North, Churchill (site of the local campus of Federation University) and Boolarra.

== Economy ==
Key industry sectors include health care, power generation, retail, paper manufacture, timber mills, agriculture, dairy, timber, information technology, engineering and education. The valley provides 85% of Victoria's electricity and has a substantial engineering sector supporting the power generation, pulp and paper production and food processing industries, etc. The tertiary education sector attracts local, interstate and international students.

Despite its outside image as a regional economy dominated by mining and electricity, the region employs more hospital and aged care workers than power industry workers and has important service, health care and education sectors. Hospitals are the largest employer in the regional economy at 5% of the workforce, followed by power industry workers at 4.2%, supermarket and grocery store workers at 3%, and aged care workers at 2.9%.

Local job data and observations also show strong demand across healthcare, retail, trades, and community services in the Latrobe Valley.

Logging is also an important industry in the hills to the north and south, with a major paper mill located at Maryvale, near Morwell. In the rugged north of the region is located the historic gold-mining town of Walhalla, amid mountains forming the west of Alpine National Park and nearby Baw Baw National Park, which includes a small winter ski resort.

=== Industry ===
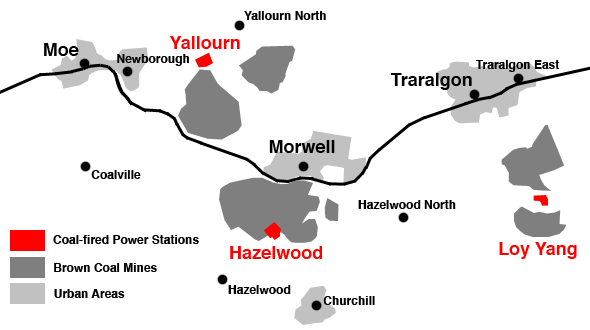
A map of major urban areas, coal-fired power stations and mines in the Latrobe Valley area.

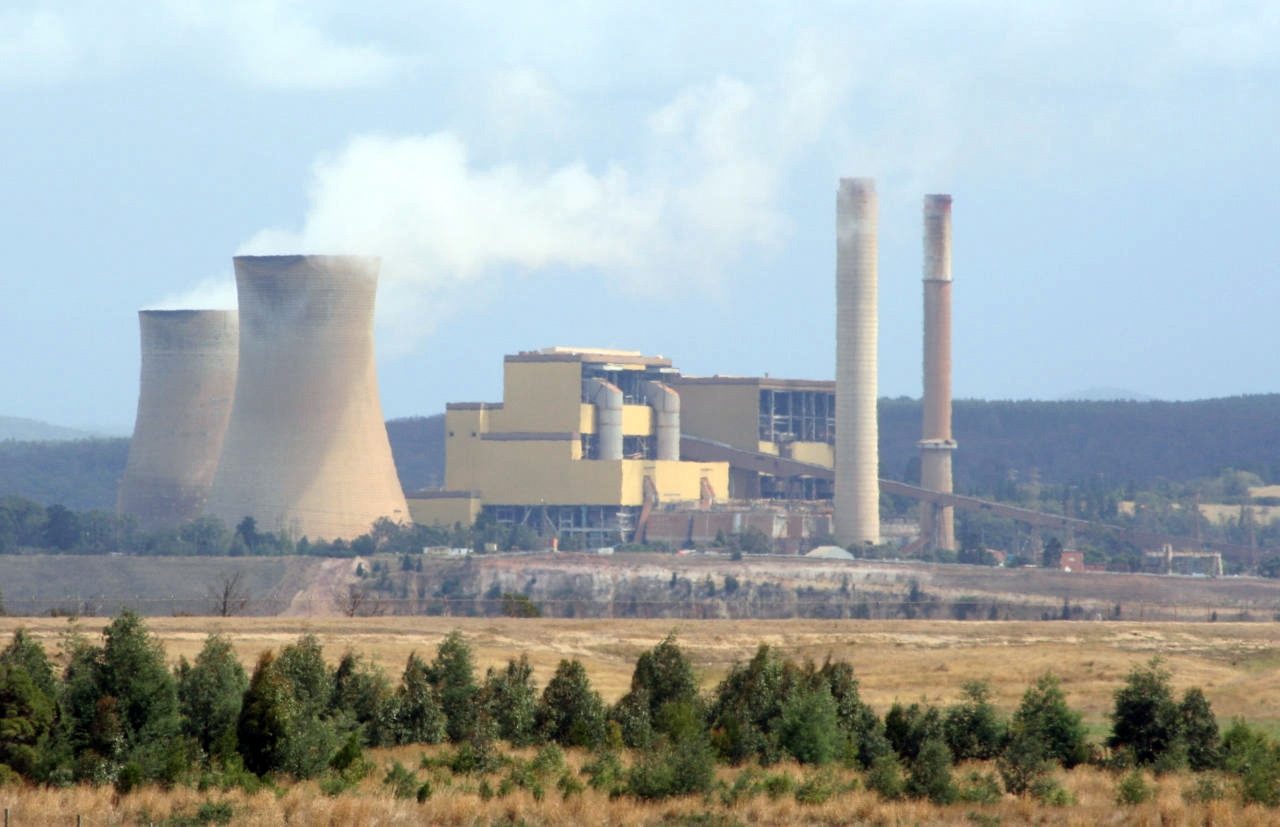
Yallourn W Power Station.

The Latrobe Valley is significant as the centre of Victoria's energy industry, specifically the mining and burning of brown coal to produce electricity. The area produces a total of approximately 85% of the electricity for the entire state of Victoria and supplies some electricity to New South Wales and Tasmania. The valley is home to four of the highest electricity producing thermal power stations in Australia. Power plants located in the Latrobe Valley include Loy Yang Power Stations A & B, Yallourn Power Station, Jeeralang Power Station (Gas) plus the former Hazelwood Power Station (closed 2017) and Energy Brix Power Station (closed August 2014). The Latrobe power stations emit more mercury than hard coal stations.

== Governance ==
Local government within the Latrobe Valley is administered by the Latrobe City Council and the Baw Baw Shire Council.

Latrobe City LGA has a population of approximately 75,000 with four major population centres: Moe, Morwell, Churchill and Traralgon, with smaller townships including Boolarra, Glengarry, Toongabbie, Tyers, Traralgon South, Yallourn North and Yinnar, with the administrative headquarters located in Morwell.

== Transport ==
The Princes Freeway runs through Latrobe Valley, bypassing most major rural cities and connecting the region to both Melbourne and East Gippsland. The centrally located centre of Moe is approximately 1 hour and 30 minutes drive from the central business district of Melbourne.

V/Line runs a rail service from metropolitan Melbourne to the Latrobe Valley and also runs services that go through the Latrobe Valley to East Gippsland. Some rail services run limited express to the Latrobe Valley – stopping in the major population centres of Warragul, Moe, Morwell and Traralgon. Other services – including the Gippslander rail service – stop at all stations in the area. Services to the Latrobe Valley run between Melbourne and Traralgon, whilst Gippsland services run between Melbourne and Bairnsdale. The Latrobe Valley/Gippsland rail line is connected to the metropolitan Melbourne Pakenham line.

Latrobe Valley Bus Lines are operated by Valley Transit, which runs connecting bus services in the Latrobe Valley area between Moe and Traralgon – consisting of inter-city services that run between Moe and Traralgon to nearby towns such as Morwell, Churchill and Yallourn North – and connecting town services that run in each major centre.

Latrobe Valley Airport (IATA: LTB, ICAO: YLTV) is located in the Latrobe Valley approximately two hours east of Melbourne, off Princes Highway, on the west side of Traralgon.

== Education ==
The Gippsland campus of Federation University is home to 2,000 on-campus students, 5,000 off-campus students and nearly 400 staff. The campus sits in the Latrobe Valley town of Churchill, 142 kilometres (88 mi) east of Melbourne on 63 hectares (160 acres) of landscaped grounds. The campus offers many undergraduate degrees, and attracts many students from the Latrobe Valley, East and West Gippsland. The Centre for Gippsland Studies is a research and community engagement facility which has conducted research and community outreach since 1985.

The Gippsland Medical School, offering postgraduate entry Bachelor of Medicine / Bachelor of Surgery (MBBS) courses was officially opened by the Federal Minister for Health and Ageing, Nicola Roxon on 5 June 2008, providing students with an opportunity to learn medicine in a rural setting working with rural practitioners. The Gippsland Medical School was subject to some local criticism in 2016 and 2017 when it was revealed that there were only 12 Gippsland-origin students among the cohort of 50 studying medicine at the regional campus. The only direct pathway to the medical degree was through a course offered at Monash University's Melbourne-based Clayton campus, whilst graduates from Federation University in Gippsland were not offered a direct pathway to the degree. Federal Member for Gippsland, Darren Chester, criticised Monash University arguing that: 'We should not be saying to our students who are completing year 12 this year that they have to move to Melbourne to access the Monash graduate medical program when we had an existing pathway in Gippsland.'

== Sport ==
=== Australian Rules Football ===
The Gippsland Power Football Club logo in the TAC Cup Under 18s.

The area has a rich and intricate Australian Football history. There are currently approximately thirty players on Australian Football League team lists from the Latrobe Valley and Gippsland. The region is represented in the Victoria State TAC Cup Under 18's competition by the Gippsland Power. Gippsland Power played its first season in the TAC Cup competition in 1993. The Power have won one premiership to date in 2005 – and been runner-up on two occasions in 1999 and 2010. Over sixty players have been drafted from Gippsland Power onto Australian Football League club lists since the first player was drafted in 1993. Gippsland Power has had three players win the TAC Cup Under 18's Morrish Medal – the award for the best and fairest player in the TAC Cup as voted by the umpires; Matthew Stolarczyk in 1999, Jarryd Blair in 2008 and Dyson Heppell in 2010.

=== Football leagues ===
The Gippsland League Football competition is the largest league in the region and one of the largest and highest standard football leagues in Victoria outside of Melbourne. Five of the ten teams in the Gippsland League are based in the Latrobe Valley. The most recent premiership won in the Gippsland League (or equivalent) by a team based in the Latrobe Valley was Traralgon Maroons in 2005. The Mid Gippsland Football League is the second largest football league in the area and comprises 10 teams – all of which are exclusively based in the Latrobe Valley. Nine of the ten teams in the Gippsland Soccer League are based in the Latrobe Valley (the other team is based in Sale). The Central & Southern Gippsland Competition league was founded in 2019.

=== Racing Industry ===
Moe Racing Club logo.

The Moe Racing Club schedules around fourteen race meetings a year. The racecourse is in Waterloo Road within a very short walk of the Moe central business district and V/Line train station. Raceday race calling can be heard in the central business district of Moe during race meetings. The two largest race meeting in Moe are the GPG Mobil Moe Cup meeting in mid October – which is one of the largest regional race meetings outside of Melbourne on the Victorian Racing calendar – and the Melbourne Cup Day meeting on the first Tuesday in November. The Moe Racing Club is the largest capacity racecourse in Gippsland. The club also offers members and guests other facilities, including Turfside Tabaret, the Turfside Bistro and the Turfside Function Centre.

Glenview Park in Traralgon hosts both horse and greyhound racing. Traralgon greyhounds race at the Glenview Park Racing Complex which is owned by the Latrobe City Council. It was specifically designed for the racing of horses and greyhounds. The inaugural greyhound race was held in 1973. Typical greyhound races at Glenview are run over a distance of 298, 513, 658 and 730 metres.

=== Other sports ===
There are a large number of golf courses in the Latrobe Valley area within an approximate 35 km radius of Moe. They include the Moe Golf Club, nestled next to Lake Narracan, Churchill & Monash Golf Club, which is located near Federation University Campus in Churchill, and Yallourn Golf Club and Yallourn Bowling Club at Newborough.

Within the Latrobe Valley there are also large communities within various other sports associations, including; soccer, basketball, netball, dancing, gymnastics, tennis, swimming, Baseball and cricket.

== Media ==
=== Newspapers ===
The area is serviced by the Latrobe Valley Express, which is delivered free of charge to residences in the Latrobe Valley region on a Wednesday and has a current circulation of approximately 34,128 (CAB). In the past there was also the Moe-Narracan News, the Morwell Advertiser and the Traralgon Journal, which were distributed free of charge once per week on Tuesday and has a circulation of approximately 11,034 (CAB).

Latrobe Valley is also home to The Gippslander Newspaper which covers the entire Gippsland region.

The now defunct Latrobe Valley Voice was a new paper to the region, having been established in March 2011. The Latrobe Valley Voice was delivered free of charge to over 30,000 residences in the Latrobe Valley region on Wednesdays. The paper collapsed on 7 May 2011 after its financial backers withdrew their support.

=== Radio ===
Warragul commercial radio stations Triple M Gippsland (94.3 and 97.9 MHz) and 3GG (531 kHz) service the region along with the Traralgon based commercial stations – TRFM (99.5 MHz) and Gold 1242.

Most ABC stations are rebroadcast locally and available in the Latrobe Valley, along with 774 ABC Melbourne which is able to be received directly from Melbourne and the local ABC Gippsland station (100.7 MHz). National ABC stations Triple J (96.7 MHz) and ABC Classic (101.5 MHz) are also broadcast from Mount Tassie. Some Melbourne stations both on the AM band and the FM band can be heard across the region, however DAB+ is not available without a vertically polarized roof-top antenna.

Community radio stations Gippsland FM (104.7 MHz) and Life FM (103.9 MHz) are also broadcast into the Latrobe Valley.

=== Television ===
The area was the first in Australia to receive its own regional television station, GLV-10 Gippsland (now Network 10), when it launched on 9 December 1961.

Programs from the three main commercial television networks (Seven, Nine and Ten) are all re-broadcast into Latrobe Valley by their regional affiliates – Seven (AMV), WIN (VTV) and Network 10 (GLV). All broadcast from the Latrobe Valley transmitter at Mount Tassie. All the commercial stations are based in Traralgon and have local commercials placed on their broadcasts.

Local news is available on all three commercial networks:

- WIN broadcasts a half-hour WIN News bulletin each weeknight at 5:30pm, produced from studios in Wollongong.
- Network 10 and Seven broadcast short local news and weather updates throughout the day, produced and broadcast from Seven's Canberra studios and 10's Tasmanian studios.

Nine previously produced a local news bulletin branded Nine News Gippsland and later Nine News Local for a brief period between 2017 and 2021 that aired on the Southern Cross Austereo primary channel when it was previously affiliated with Nine.

Both national public broadcasters, ABC (ABC TV) and SBS (SBS TV) are broadcast into the Latrobe Valley as well, via Mount Tassie, as well as from the Dandenong Ranges transmitters located east of Melbourne.

Additional digital multi-channels broadcast by all the networks in addition to the ones listed above are available on the digital service called Freeview to viewers in the Latrobe Valley region. These channels include HD simulcasts of the primary channel (available on channels 20, 30, 50, 60 and 80). As well as ABC Family, ABC Entertains, ABC News, SBS Viceland, SBS World Movies, 10 Drama, 10 Comedy, Nickelodeon, 7two, 7mate, 7flix, 7Bravo, 9Gem, 9Go!, 9Life and Sky News Regional.

Television transmissions from Mount Dandenong for the Melbourne market (Seven, Nine and Ten) can also be received in digital in the Latrobe Valley with a suitable roof-top antenna with. Reception in the west Latrobe Valley, namely Moe, can receive these Melbourne transmissions clearly.

Subscription television service Foxtel (previously Austar until 2014) is available via satellite.

== See also ==
- Gippsland Aeronautics
- List of valleys of Australia
