= Morwell Advertiser =

Former newspaper in regional Victoria

The Morwell Advertiser was a weekly newspaper published from 1886 until 1972 in Morwell, Victoria, Australia. It was initially published on Saturdays, however it changed to Fridays from 1890 until the 1930s when it changed to Thursdays.

== Name changes ==
The paper started as the Morwell Advocate & Boolara & Mirboo Chronicle and then became the Morwell Advertiser & Weekly Chronicle from 1887 to 1888. In 1888 it became the Morwell Advertiser. It continued as the Morwell Advertiser until 1967 when it briefly became the Latrobe Valley Advocate before reverting to Morwell Advertiser in 1969.

== History ==
The first issue of the Morwell Advocate & Boolara & Mirboo Chronicle, published Saturday 30 October 1886, outlined the purpose of the paper on the front page which stated

"It is the intention of the Proprietors to seize every opportunity of advancing the interests of Morwell and the surrounding district. Every effort will likewise be made to obtain the latest and most reliable information for the public. Full reports will be given of all shire councils and other important meetings which from time to time will be held within the large district where the Morwell Advocate circulates. The latest markets will be duly recorded from week to week; while those of its readers who are of a sporting turn of mind will find much within its columns that will be of interest to them. While special attention will be paid to local matters, those of a political nature will not be lost sight of. In short it is intended to make the Advocate all that a journal should be."

George Watson (1874–1942) was the editor and proprietor of the Morwell Advertiser from 1894 until his death in 1942. He was only 20 years old when he purchased the paper and was at the time the youngest newspaper publisher in Victoria. Watson was a prominent figure in Morwell, being involved in practically every public activity including starting the initial tennis club, president of Gippsland Bowling Association for 15 years, Past Master of the Morwell Masonic and Marc Lodges, and a Justice of the Peace amongst other activities. He was also one of the founders of the Victorian Provincial Press Association in 1910.

In 1916 George Watson purchased the Morwell & Yinnar Gazette newspaper and it became incorporated with the Morwell Advertiser.

The paper was briefly sold to H. T. Hipwell, who also owned the Gippslander in Mirboo Shire, in 1927. However, it was sold back to George Watson in 1928.

In 1967 the Morwell Advertiser and the Moe Advocate merged to form the Latrobe Valley Advocate & Advertiser. However, in 1968 the Elliott Newspaper Group bought the Latrobe Valley Advocate & Advertiser and reinstated them as separate bi-weekly papers from 3 March 1969.

Meanwhile, during the 1960s a free regional newspaper was established in the Latrobe Valley called the Latrobe Valley Express. Its first issue was published on 18 June 1965 and the first regular issue was published on 14 July. By the late 1960s the Latrobe Valley Express had "severely dented the business of the paid newspapers in the region. They could not compete in circulation or penetration." The Elliott Newspaper Group therefore had to decide how to respond to this challenge. It was suggested that they should start an opposition free paper, however they decided instead to buy out the Latrobe Valley Express. The Elliott Group was the majority partner with K. S. Hopkins and Sons Pty Ltd, who published the Warragul Gazette. The deal became official on 9 February 1970.

However, as neither the Latrobe Valley Express nor the paid papers owned by the Elliott Newspaper Group (Moe Advocate, Morwell Advertiser and Traralgon Journal) were doing well it was decided to shut down the Moe Advocate and the Morwell Advertiser. The Morwell Advertiser ceased on 27 April 1972.

== See also ==
- List of newspapers in Australia
