= Holsworth =

Holsworth is a surname. Notable people with the surname include:

- Bill Holsworth, Australian mammalogist and philanthropist
- Greg Holsworth (born c. 1990), American football coach
