= Yallourn Power Station =

Australian coal-fired power station

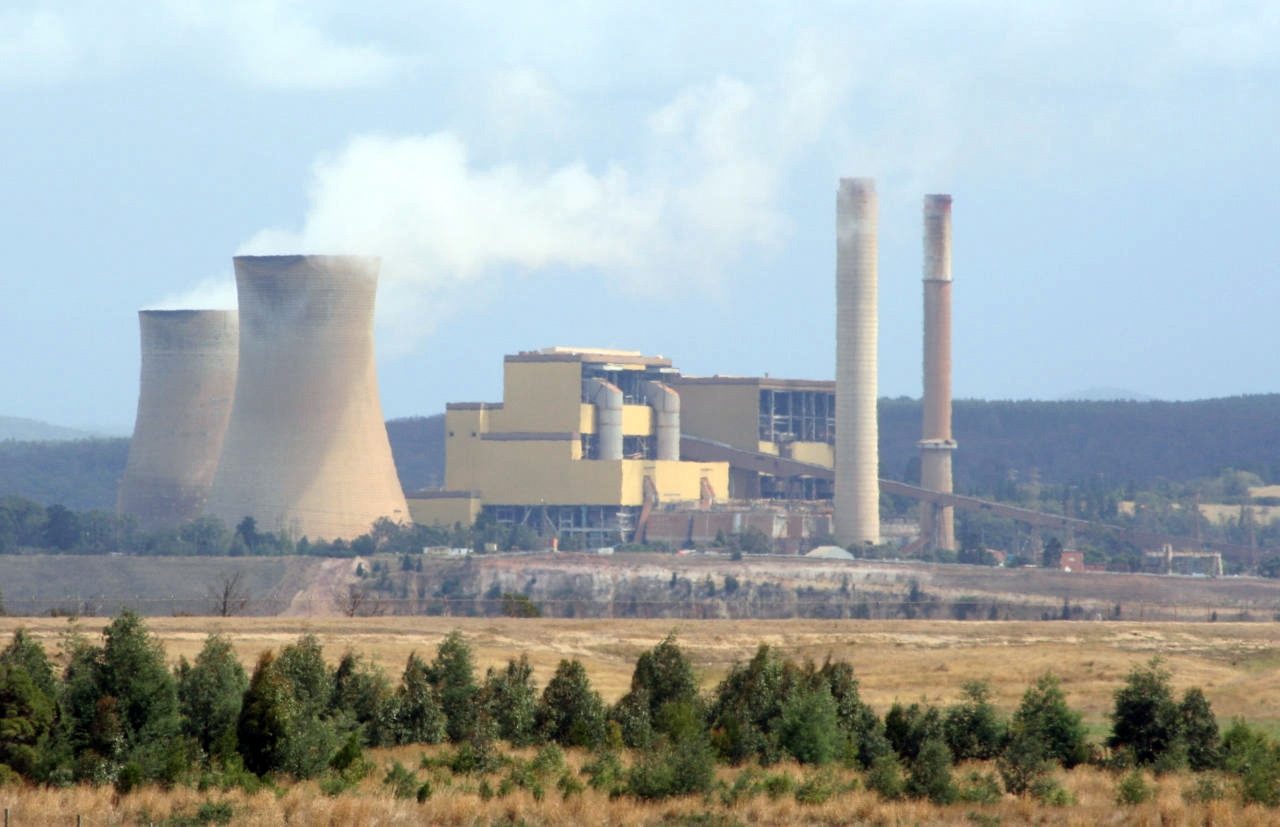
- Yallourn W Power Station viewed from the south, 2007
- Location of the Yallourn Power Station
- Country: Australia
- Location: Yallourn, Victoria
- Coordinates: 38°10′42″S 146°20′21″E
- Status: Operational
- Construction began: 1921
- Commission date: Yallourn A: 1928; Yallourn B: 1932; Yallourn C: 1954; Yallourn D: 1957; Yallourn E: 1961; Yallourn W: 1973-1982
- Decommission date: A: 1969; B: 1970; C: 1985; D: 1986; E: 1989
- Owner: EnergyAustralia (Yallourn W)

Thermal power station
- Primary fuel: Brown coal

Power generation
- Units operational: A: 70 MW (94,000 hp); B: 100 MW (130,000 hp); C: 120 MW (160,000 hp); D: 120 MW (160,000 hp); E: 2 × 120 MW (160,000 hp); W: 2 × 350 MW (470,000 hp); W: 2 × 375 MW (503,000 hp)
- Nameplate capacity: 1,480 MW (1,980,000 hp)

External links
- Website: Energy Australia - Yallourn Power Station
- Commons: Related media on Commons

The Yallourn Power Station, now owned by EnergyAustralia is located in the Latrobe Valley of Victoria, Australia, beside the Latrobe River. Yallourn Power Station was a complex of six brown coal–fired thermal power stations built progressively from the 1920s to the 1960s; all except one have now been decommissioned. Today, only the 1,450-megawatt (1,940,000 hp) Yallourn W plant remains. It is the second largest power station in Victoria, supplying about 7.8TWh in 2025, or around 15% of Victoria's electricity and 4% of the National Electricity Market.

The adjacent open cut brown coal mine is the largest open cut coal mine in Australia, with reserves sufficient to meet the projected needs of the power station to 2028. On 10 March 2021, EnergyAustralia announced that it would close the Yallourn Power Station in mid-2028, four years ahead of schedule, and replace it with a 350-megawatt battery in the Latrobe Valley by the end of 2026. At that time, Yallourn produced about 20% of Victoria's electricity.

== Yallourn A, B, C, D and E ==
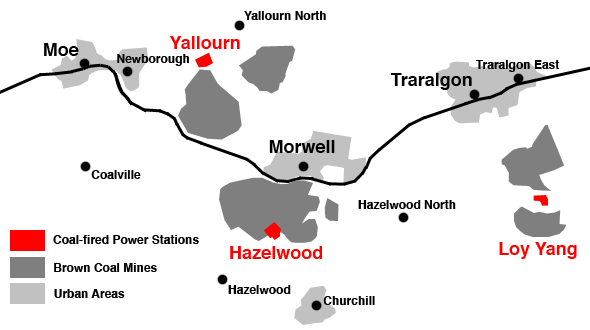
Map of the major towns and coal-fired power stations in the Latrobe Valley

Power generation at Yallourn was first proposed in 1919 when the Victorian Government appointed a committee to investigate the use of coal from the Latrobe Valley. The plant was operated by the State Electricity Commission of Victoria (SECV), and the first sod was turned at the Yallourn Power Station site in 1921. Along with the power station, the town of Yallourn was constructed nearby to house workers at the plant. Coal was moved from the open cut mine to the power station by the Yallourn 900 mm railway, a narrow-gauge electric railway, running along temporary tracks in the mine itself. The Morwell Interconnecting Railway was later constructed to the Morwell power station and briquette works to allow the transfer of Yallourn coal to the briquette works, because coal from the Morwell mine (later renamed the Hazelwood mine) was not suitable for making briquettes.

The first plant, Yallourn A, was opened in 1928. It consisted of six Metropolitan-Vickers sets each generating 12.5MW. Steam was supplied by 12 John Thompson chain grate boilers, each producing 80,000 lb/hr at 260PSI and 640 °F (338 °C).

Yallourn B entered service on 11 April 1932. It consisted of four Metropolitan-Vickers sets of generating 25MW. Steam was supplied by 10 John Thompson chain grate boilers each producing 120,000 lb/hr of steam at 260PSI and 670 °F. Yallourn A was demolished in 1968, followed by Yallourn B in the early 1970s. Yallourn C, D and E stations were commissioned in 1954, 1957 and 1961 respectively, and provided the bulk of Victoria's power until Hazelwood Power Station became operational in the mid 1960s. Yallourn A, B, C & D were constructed as "range-type" power stations, which connected individual boilers to a common steam range before being used to drive the turbines.

C station had two turbo alternators, each generating 60 megawatts (80,000 hp). Steam was supplied by six pulverized-coal-burning water tube boilers. Each boiler produced 200,000lbs/hour of steam at 645psi and 825 °F (441 °C). D station was exactly the same as C station.

E station had two units, each generating 120 megawatts (160,000 hp), with hydrogen-cooled generators but no stator water cooling. Steam came from two PF boilers, each producing 950,000lbs/hour of steam at 1600psi and 1,050 °F (566 °C). Yallourn E was the first unitised station constructed in the complex, in that each boiler was paired with its own turbine.

Yallourn E station ceased generating power in January 1989. C, D and E plants were demolished from 1995 onwards, and the site was cleared by 1999. In 1984, the narrow-gauge railway in the mine was replaced by conveyor belts, and the Morwell Interconnecting Railway was replaced by road haulage in 1993.

== Briquette factory ==
In conjunction with the power station, the open cut mine also fed a briquette factory operated by the SECV. The first stage of the factory came into operation in November 1924 with a capacity of about 400 long tons (410 t) per day. A major extension was approved in 1927 and completed early in 1931, increasing the capacity to 1,200 long tons (1,200 t) per day. Using German technology, the factory also generated electricity, with a maximum output of approximately 10 megawatts (13,000 hp) it produced 220 megawatt-hours (790 GJ) daily, of which about 50 megawatt-hours (180 GJ) was used in the factory and 170 megawatt-hours (610 GJ) was fed into the state grid.

The plant closed in 1970, after the discovery and reticulation of natural gas in Victoria, which also led to the closure of the major Lurgi briquette gasification plant in Morwell. Remaining demand for briquettes was met by the Morwell briquette factory that had been opened in 1959. It was shut down in 2014.

== Yallourn W ==
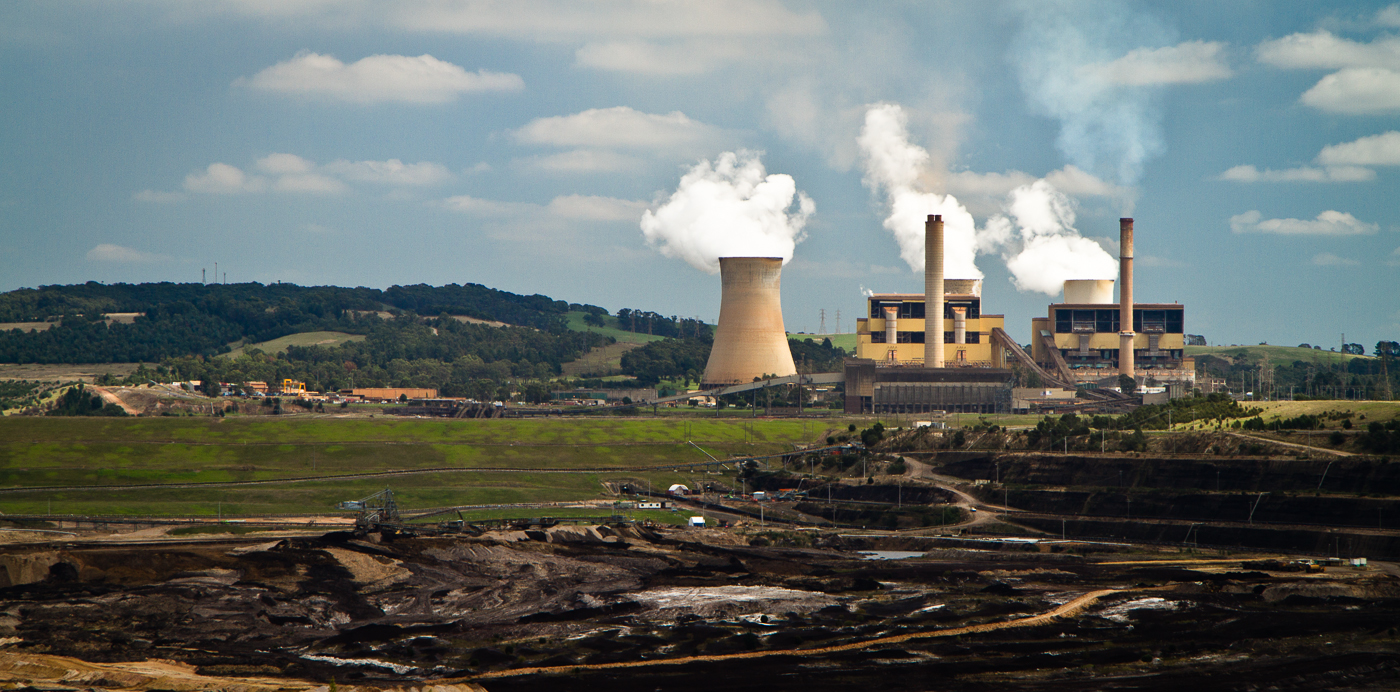
Yallourn W power station with brown coal mine in the front, 2012

The current Yallourn W power station was built at Yallourn West in the 1970s. The four units are Toshiba-built three-stage reheat turbines with steam supplied by four "subcritical" pulverized coal-fired boilers. In 1969 it was announced that the town of Yallourn would be demolished to enable an expansion of the coal mine, with demolition commencing in the 1970s and completed by 1982. Yallourn W power station was the second Victorian generating entity to be privatised in 1996 when it was sold to a consortium including PowerGen, Itochu, AMP, Hastings and State Super. The plant is currently owned by EnergyAustralia.

Because the coal supply from Yallourn's East Field mine was expected to be exhausted in 2007, work commenced on a diversion of the nearby Morwell River in 2002 to enable access to further coal sources from the Maryvale coal field. Without that, the power station faced significant modification or even closure. The Morwell River Diversion, and the access to coal supplies it allowed, ensured that Yallourn could continue to operate until 2032. The 3.5-kilometre (2.2 mi) diversion was constructed over five years, at a cost of A$122 million, and was completed on time and on budget.

In 2007, the station's name was shortened to "Yallourn Power Station". Carbon Monitoring for Action estimated that the power station emitted 10.7 million tonnes (11.8×10^{6} short tons; 10.5×10^{6} long tons) of greenhouse gases each year as a result of burning coal. The Federal Government announced the introduction of a Carbon Pollution Reduction Scheme commencing in 2010 to help combat climate change. It is expected to impact on emissions from power stations. The National Pollutant Inventory provides details of other pollutant emissions, but not CO_{2}.

During 2018 and 2019, the station had 37 outages. In 2024, at least one of the four generators had unplanned outage for 32% of the time.

=== Fire and flooding ===
On 21 June 2013, a fire broke out in a control panel causing three units to trip. This multi-unit contingency caused a "Pricing Event" on the National Electricity Market, and the Market Operator reported the event as part of an industrial action campaign. Police later announced their finding that the event was an act of sabotage.

In late 2007, a subsidence in the mine wall resulted in the Latrobe River bursting through, damaging coal conveying plant and flooding low levels of the mine. Urgent earthwork repairs were made with the co-operation of other power generators. Coal production was limited for some weeks.

On 6 June 2012, a levee bank failure resulted in the flooding of the Yallourn coal mine causing damage to its infrastructure and cutting fuel supply to the power station.

On 11 June 2021, the mine was flooded by heavy rains, shutting down three of the four power units.

=== Closure announcement ===
On 10 March 2021, it was announced that the closure date for Yallourn W had been revised from 2032 to 2028 due to low wholesale electricity prices as well as rising operating costs. A 350 MW battery is set to be completed by 2026.

== Incidents ==
Commemorative plaque dedicated to Graeme John Edwards outside the Yallourn Power Station.

On 12 November 2018 an arc flash and explosion inside the Yallourn Power Station resulted in the death of 54 year old Unit Controller Graeme John Edwards. Edwards was a highly experienced 30 year veteran on the site. Energy Australia were later fined $1.5 million and convicted on three counts of:

- Failing to provide a safe workplace
- Failing to provide safe systems of work
- Failing to provide necessary information, training and supervision

== Engineering heritage award ==
The power station site is listed as an Engineering Heritage National Landmark by Engineers Australia as part of its Engineering Heritage Recognition Program.

== Popular culture ==
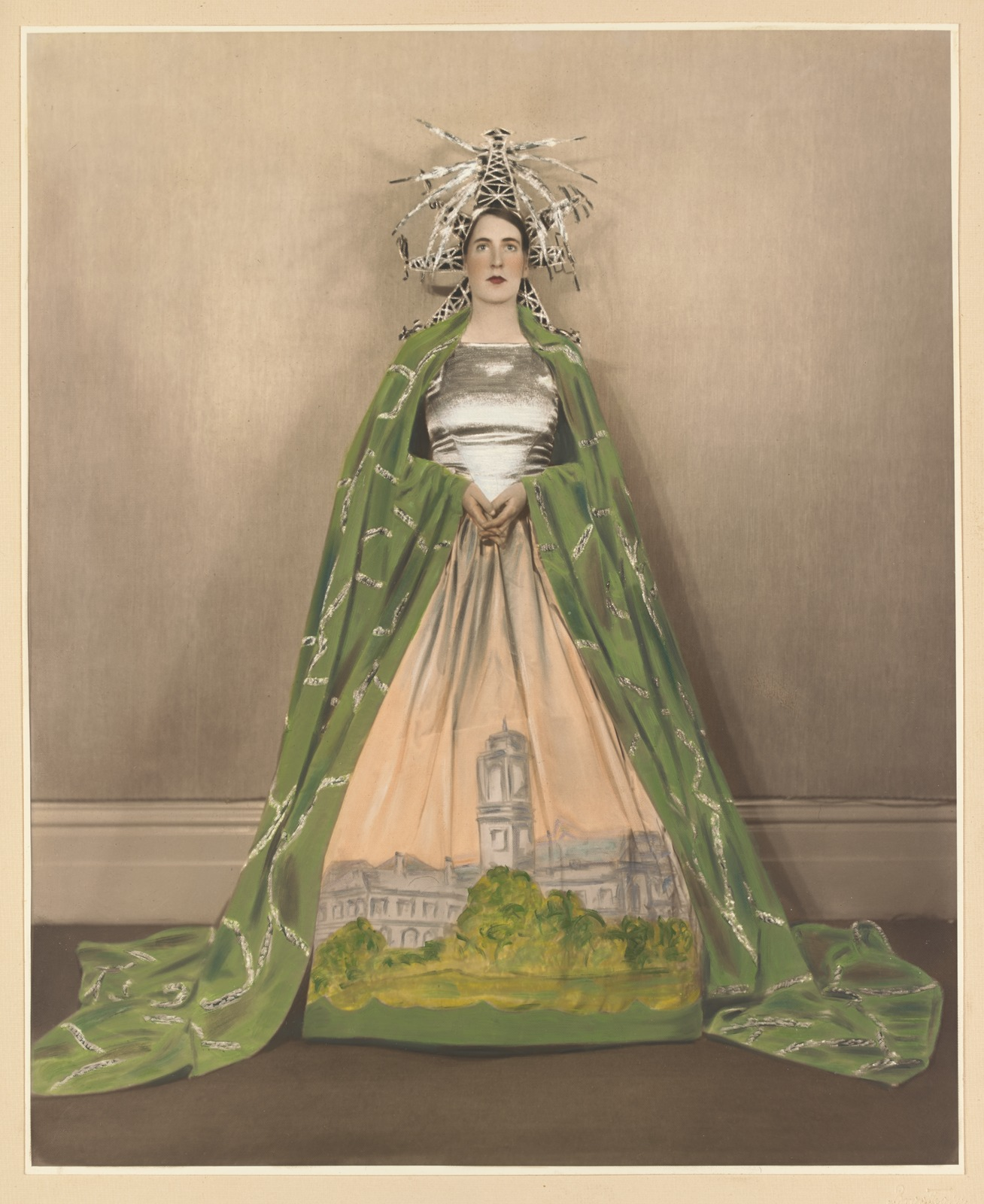
Jessie Deakin Brookes as the state of Victoria including a headpiece modelled on the Yallourn power station transmission tower

In 1934, Jessie Deakin Brookes wore a costume for the Pageant of Nations celebrating the centenary of Victoria, created by Thelma Thomas. It featured three Melbourne buildings, the Murray Darling river and irrigation system and its headpiece was modelled on the Yallourn power station transmission tower. It was the inspiration of the exhibition Velvet, Iron, Ashes at the State Library in Victoria in 2019-2020.

== See also ==
- The Power Makers, a 1957 short documentary about the power station
- List of power stations in Victoria
- List of coal-fired power stations in Australia
