= The Power Makers =

- Directed by: Lee Robinson
- Produced by: George Hughes
- Starring: James Condon
- Production company: Australian National Film Board
- Release date: 1957
- Running time: 10 minutes
- Country: Australia
- Language: English

The Power Makers is a 1957 Australian short directed by Lee Robinson, about brown coal coal mining in Australia and the Yallourn Power Station.

It won a silver medal for Best Documentary at a 1959 Australian film awards (which became the AFIs).
