= Central & Southern Gippsland Competition =

Australian rules football league in the Latrobe Valley region of Victoria, Australia

General Information
Founded	2019 (1st season 2021)

Records
- Highest Score
- Most goals in a game
- Most goals in a season
- Most premierships
- Most flags in a row
- Most wins in a row
- Most loses in a row

The Central & Southern Gippsland Competition is an Australian rules football league in the Latrobe Valley region of Victoria, Australia.

== History ==
Following the proposed changes outlined in the AFL Gippsland Leagues and Competitions Review Draft Recommendations Report. The recommendations for the Alberton Football Netball League and the Mid Gippsland Football League to come together to form the Central and Southern Gippsland Competition, which was founded in 2019.

The clubs are set to compete in seniors, reserves, and under-17s. Both of those new entities will be administered and governed by AFL Gippsland.

First games were played in 2021, as the previous season was cancelled because of the pandemic. The 2021 season was shut down by order of the Victorian State Government.

The first completed season was in 2022, Yinnar won the premiership.

== Clubs ==
Club	Colours	Nickname	Flags	senior premierships
Boolarra		Demons	4	1955, 1958, 1997, 2011
Fish Creek		Kangaroos	20	1955, 1956, 1958, 1959, 1960, 1961, 1963, 1964, 1965, 1966, 1967, 1985, 1991, 1992, 2000, 2001, 2002, 2016, 2017, 2018
Foster		Tigers	8	1946, 1978, 1980, 1982, 1984, 1989, 1993, 2010
Hill End & Grove		Rovers/Hill Men	6	1938, 1948, 1949, 1962, 1974, 1981
Meeniyan Dumbalk United		Demons	5	1975, 1976, 1981, 1988, 1990
Mirboo North		Tigers	7	1956, 1957, 2006, 2007, 2013, 2014, 2017
Morwell East		Hawks	3	1979, 1980, 2005
Newborough		Bulldogs	10	1959, 1978, 1988, 1989, 1990, 1999, 2000, 2002, 2003, 2016
Stony Creek		Lions	2	1983, 2009
Tarwin		Sharks	1	2004
Thorpdale		Blues	5	1946, 1960, 1961, 1976, 1985
Toora Districts		Magpies	1	1973
Trafalgar		Bloods	8	1975, 1991, 1992, 1994, 1995, 2009, 2010, 2012
Yallourn/Yallourn North		Bombers	5	1986, 1987, 1993, 1996, 2019
Yinnar		Magpies	14	1939, 1954, 1964, 1967, 1969, 1970, 1971, 1973, 1998, 2001, 2004, 2008, 2015, 2022

List of premierships from previous country leagues.

== Football Grand Final Results ==
Seniors

Seniors:	Central & Southern Gippsland Competition: Grand Final Scores				
Year	Premiers	Scores	Runner up	Scores	Venue / Comments
2020	In recess >	COVID-19			
2021					
2022					
2023					
2024					
2025					

== 2022 Ladder ==
Central & Southern Gippsland	Wins	Losses	Draws	Byes	For	Against	%	Pts	Final	Team	G	B	Pts	Team	G	B	Pts
Tarwin	14	2	0	2	1140	572	199.30%	64	Elimination A	Yinnar	7	8	50	Foster	6	7	43
Newborough	12	4	0	2	987	617	159.97%	56	Elimination B	Boolarra	8	6	54	Hill End	5	6	36
Foster	12	4	0	2	938	669	140.21%	56	Qualifying	Newborough	7	15	57	Tarwin	3	5	23
Boolarra	10	5	1	2	704	575	122.43%	50	Semi	Yinnar	16	14	110	Boolarra	9	4	58
Hill End	9	6	1	2	802	686	116.91%	46	Premliminary	Yinnar	16	10	106	Tarwin	10	4	64
Yinnar	9	7	0	2	1041	589	176.74%	44	Grand	Yinnar	8	9	57	Newborough	5	7	37
Morwell East	9	7	0	2	858	678	126.55%	44									
Stony Creek	7	9	0	2	708	740	95.68%	36									
Fish Creek	7	9	0	2	687	822	83.58%	36									
Mirboo North	7	9	0	2	676	973	69.48%	36									
Meeniyan Dumbalk United	5	11	0	2	605	790	76.58%	28									
Thorpdale	1	15	0	2	612	1316	46.50%	12									
Toora	1	15	0	2	452	1183	38.21%	12									
