= Energy Brix Power Station =

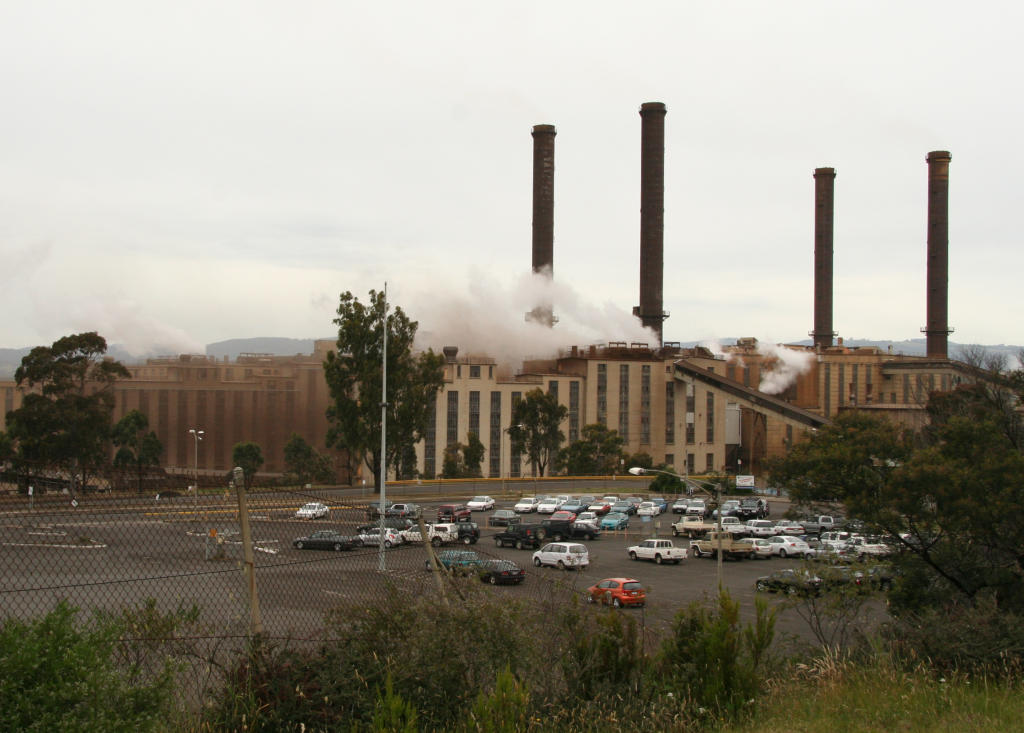
- Energy Brix Power Station and the associated briquette factory
- Country: Australia
- Location: Morwell, Victoria
- Coordinates: 38°15′16″S 146°24′49″E
- Status: Decommissioned
- Construction began: 1949
- Commission date: 1956
- Decommission date: August 2014
- Owner: EnergyAustralia (Yallourn W)

Thermal power station
- Primary fuel: Brown coal

Power generation
- Units operational: 170 MW (230,000 hp)

External links
- Commons: Related media on Commons

The Energy Brix Power Station was a brown coal–fired thermal power station located at Morwell, in Victoria, Australia. The power station was used to supply electricity for the retail market, as well as the production of briquettes in the adjacent Energy Brix briquette works. It was shut down in August 2014 and is currently the earliest surviving large-scale power station designed to provide electricity to the state electricity network. A 100 MW / 200 MWh grid battery is being built at the site.

== History ==
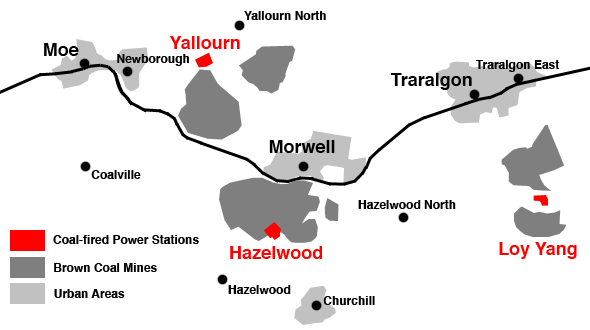
A map of the major towns and coal-fired power stations in the Latrobe Valley.

Work on the power station and briquette works commenced in 1949 by the State Electricity Commission of Victoria (SECV), when field works on the Morwell open cut mine commenced, and briquette production equipment was ordered from Germany.

The SECV expected the first briquette factory to start operating in 1953. But by 1952, the whole project had come to a halt. The recession of 1951 with its credit restrictions had resulted in dismissal of half of the workforce, while equipment for the first two factories lay in limbo at the site. Delivery of the further two factories had been deferred.

In 1955 the project was recommenced. Although the SECV decided to persevere with the first two briquette factories, it cancelled the orders for the planned third and fourth, halving the capacity of briquette production before it had even bugun. The Morwell project's priorities were now changed from briquetting to electrical power generation.

Originally known as the Morwell Power Station, production at the plant started in 1956, with the briquettes produced used for domestic and industrial use, as well as town gas production for Melbourne at an adjacent gasworks by the Gas and Fuel Corporation of Victoria. Morwell Station consisted of one Low Pressure 20MW Metropolitan Vickers axial turbine, three High Pressure 30MW Metropolitan Vickers axial turbo generators and one 60MW (Total) Stal Laval cotra-rotating radial turbine. Steam was supplied by pulverized brown coal-fired boilers made by Mitchell. Eight Boilers supplied 8.7MPa 490Celsious Super Heated High Pressure Steam into a Range that supplied the Three 30MW Metropolitan Vickers Turbines which exhaust of those turbines went into a process main (300Kpa 175Celsious). The Process Main supplied steam to the LP 20MW Metropolitan Vickers Turbine (Which had a condenser and was attached to Marley Forced Draft American Redwood Cooling Towers North of the Power Station and Briquette Factory) and up to 24 Briquette Factory Driers. 8.7MPa 490Celsious Super Heated High Pressure Steam out of the range from the Eight Boilers also supplied steam to the Stal Laval cotra-rotating radial turbine which had a condenser and Marley Forced Draft American Redwood Cooling Towers south of the Power Station.

It was unexpectedly discovered that coal from the Morwell open cut mine, with its high alkali and sulphur content, was not suitable for briquetting. The briquettes deteriorated quickly and fouled the boilers. In order to produce usable briquettes, Yallourn coal had to be transported to supply the Morwell briquette factories on the interconnecting railway, which was an additional cost. At this time, a decline in demand for briquettes was becoming evident, due to competition from oil, electricity for domestic heating, and several years later, the discovery of natural gas in Bass Strait.

The same year the station and briquette factory came into production (1956), the SEC announced a new, much larger power station - Hazelwood Power Station, was to be built to the south of the Morwell Open Cut.

On Boxing Day 2003 a fire destroyed the coal cross-over conveyor that fed B, C & D briquette plants. Following the fire, only A plant continued in operation, effectively operating at 1/8th of intended capacity until closure.

The Briquette Factory was taken off for the last time in August 2014. The last boiler and turbine in the power station was taken off on 8 September 2014. Around 75 people lost their jobs not including many more employees that were not directly employed by the Briquette Factory and Power Station. In its heyday the "Morwell Briquette and Power" as it was then known employed around 1000 people and the power station was designed to be what's known as an "Island Station", which meant it could be used to supply power needed to run start up plant at other power stations in the area if for some reason they all were temporarily shut down.

== Privatisation ==
The power station and briquette works were split from the SECV in November 1993, when former Morwell Briquette and Power division was established as a government business enterprise named Energy Brix Australia (This name meant "Bricks of Energy" referring to the Briquettes). At the time of the split, the plant employed 370 people, and exported 80,000 tonnes (79,000 long tons) of briquettes to Germany, Slovenia, Korea, Japan, New Zealand and Cyprus. Energy Brix Australia was sold on 4 August 1996. In February 2006 a licence was granted to the company for the retail sale of electricity from its plant.

== Process ==
Heat was reclaimed from the turbine bled steam produced by electricity generation, and used to dry brown coal from up to 65% moisture down to 10% for use in coal briquettes manufactured on the site for both domestic consumption and export. The Energy Brix power station has five steam turbines with a combined generation capacity of 170 megawatts (230,000 hp). The power station sourced raw brown coal for briquette production via train from the Yallourn and Loy Yang open cut mines, and it's steaming coal for power generation from the Morwell open cut mine.

Carbon Monitoring for Action estimates this power station emits 1.31 million tonnes (1.29×10^{6} long tons) of greenhouse gases each year as a result of burning coal. The Australian Government has announced the introduction of a Carbon Pollution Reduction Scheme commencing in 2010 to help combat climate change. It is expected to impact on emissions from power stations. The National Pollutant Inventory provides details of other pollutant emissions, but, as at 23 November 2008, not CO_{2}.

== See also ==
- List of power stations in Victoria
- State Electricity Commission of Victoria
