= Bill Holsworth =

Australian mammalogist and philanthropist

- Education: University of British Columbia
- Known for: Holsworth Wildlife Research Endowment
- Spouse: Carol Ann Holsworth
- Scientific career
- Fields: Ecology, mammalogy
- Thesis: Marsupial behaviour with special references to population homeostasis in the quokka on the West End of Rottnest Island (1964)

William Norton Holsworth is an Australian mammalogist and philanthropist. Since 1989, he and his wife Carol Holsworth have managed the Holsworth Wildlife Research Endowment to fund wildlife research by Australian postgraduate researchers.

== Research career ==
Holsworth earned his Bachelor of Science at the University of British Columbia in 1958. During his Master of Science, completed at the University of British Columbia in April 1960, he studied the interactions between moose, elk and buffalo in Elk Island National Park. For his PhD research, conducted at the University of Western Australia, Holsworth studied behaviour and population homeostasis in quokkas on Rottnest Island, off the coast of Western Australia.

Bill and Carol Holsworth moved to Bendigo, Victoria in 1976. In 1979, Holsworth was voted a representative of the Conservation Council of Victoria (now Environment Victoria). In 2004, he was granted honorary life membership by the Australian Mammal Society for providing "long standing service to the Society and to the advancement of substantive knowledge of Australasian mammals."

== Philanthropy ==
Holsworth and his wife Carol founded the Holsworth Wildlife Research Endowment in 1989. According to Holsworth in 2014, “When I retired from university teaching I wanted to continue training the next generation of ecologists and promoting conservation." In its first year, the endowment provided $15,000 to fund three wildlife research projects by Australian postgraduate students. In 1991, Bill and Carol Holsworth received an inheritance from Carol's father, a substantial proportion of which went towards the endowment.

By 2006, the endowment had provided over $1 million for 180 student projects. By 2014, it had funded 164 students from the University of Melbourne alone, with grants totaling $1.4 million. In 2014, the Holsworth Wildlife Research Endowment was extended to all Australian universities. Holsworth's philanthropy has been recognised by both the University of Melbourne and Deakin University.
