= Environment Victoria =

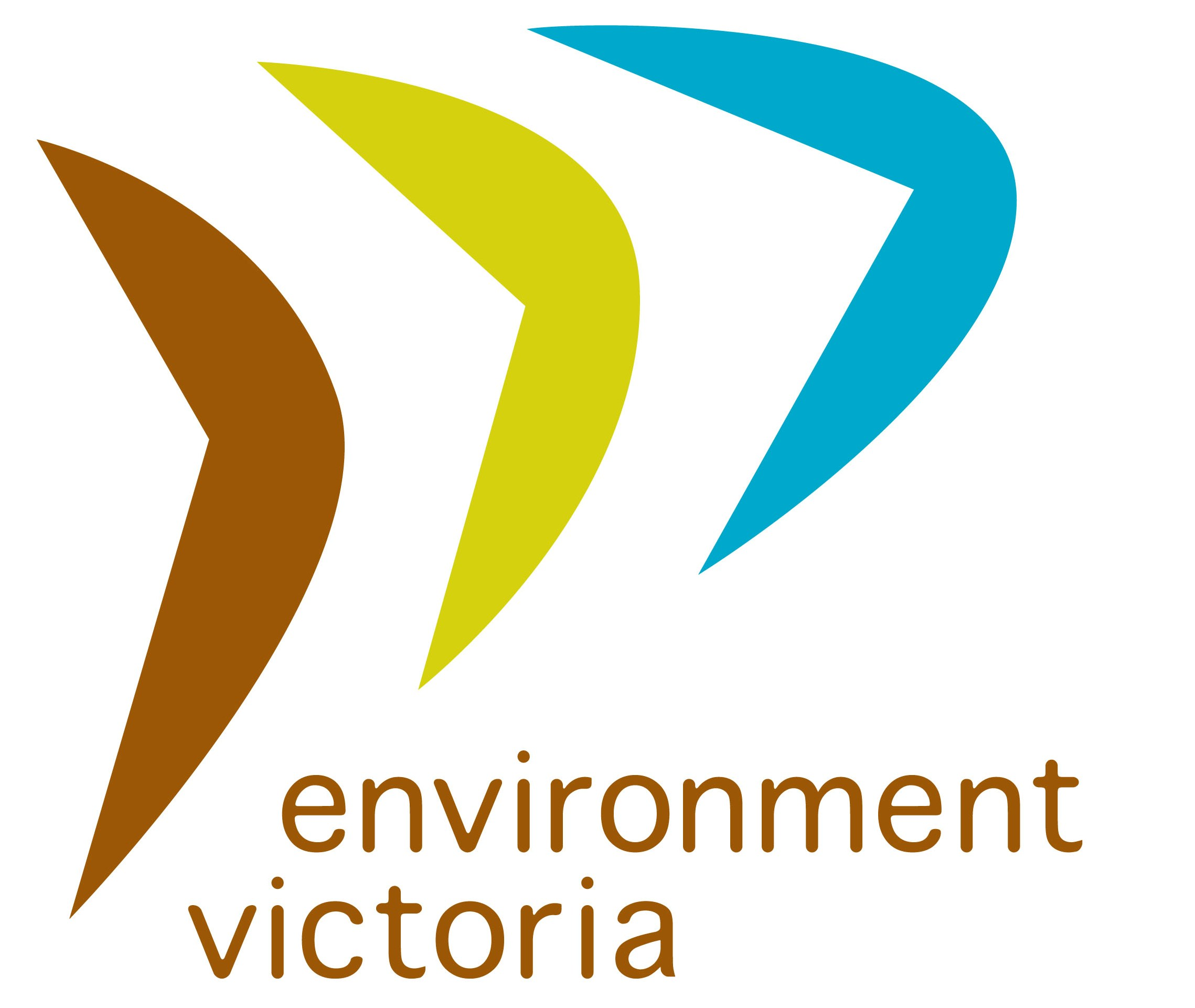
- Founded: 1969
- Type: Charitable trust
- Purpose: Environmentalism
- Location: Melbourne, Victoria, Australia
- Origins: Founded after the successful campaign to conserve the Little Desert in western Victoria
- Region served: Victoria
- Method: Education, campaigning, lobbying, research
- Website: http://www.environmentvictoria.org.au

Environment Victoria, formerly the Conservation Council of Victoria, is an Australian not-for-profit, charitable group and Victoria's peak non-government environment organisation. It works in collaboration with over 150 groups Australia-wide to protect Victoria's environment and relies on financial support from donors, members, grants and sponsorships.

== History ==
The group was originally formed in 1969 as the Conservation Council of Victoria as a result of a successful campaign to save the Little Desert National Park from subdivision. In 1994, the organisation changed name to Environment Victoria to reflect the broader range of issues it now deals with.

From 1971 until 1997, two representatives of the Conservation Council of Victoria served on the Land Conservation Council which was responsible for systematically investigating and recommending balanced use of public land across the state. John Landy (later Governor of Victoria) and professor of botany John Turner were the first representatives. Joan Lindros, Bill Holsworth and Malcolm Calder were also long serving representatives.

== Successes ==
Environment Victoria list the Walk Against Warming, the successful campaign to put a price on pollution in Australia and the federal government's decision to withdraw funding from HRL's proposed coal-fired power station in 2012 among their successes.

== See also ==
- Conservation Council of South Australia
- Conservation Council of Western Australia
- Queensland Conservation Council
