= Traralgon Journal =

Former newspaper in Victoria, Australia

The Traralgon Journal was an English language newspaper published in Traralgon, Victoria in Australia. From 1883 until 1923 the newspaper was published as the Gippsland Farmer's Journal.

== History ==
The Traralgon Record was a weekly newspaper published from 14 December 1883 until 22 December 1932, when it was incorporated into the Traralgon Journal. It was also known as the Traralgon Record and Morwell, Mirboo, Toongabbie, Heyfield, Tyers & Callignee Advertiser.

== Digitisation ==
The paper has been digitised from 1886 to 1932 as part of the Australian Newspapers Digitisation Program of the National Library of Australia.

== See also ==
- List of newspapers in Australia
