= Morwell River =

Morwell
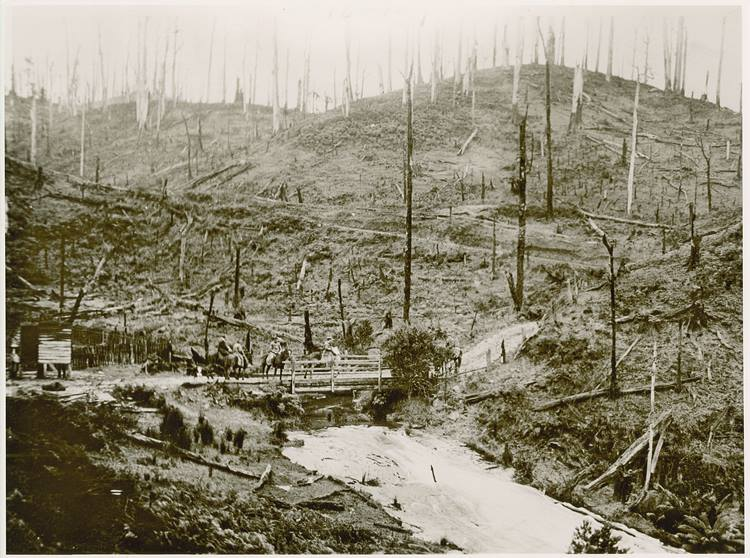
- CRB party crossing Morwell River

- Mouth of the Morwell River in Victoria

Location
- Country: Australia
- State: Victoria
- Region: South East Coastal Plain (IBRA), West Gippsland, South Gippsland
- Local government area: Latrobe City
- Towns: Boolarra, Yinnar, Morwell

Physical characteristics
- Source: Strzelecki Ranges
- Source confluence: West Branch and East Branch of the Morwell River
  - location: Boolarra South
  - coordinates: 38°26′28″S 146°18′45″E
  - elevation: 172 m (564 ft)
- Mouth: confluence with the Latrobe River
  - location: south of Yallourn North
  - coordinates: 38°10′25″S 146°21′50″E
  - elevation: 16 m (52 ft)
- Length: 41 km (25 mi)

Basin features
- River system: West Gippsland catchment
- Tributaries
  - left: O'Grady Creek
  - right: Middle Creek (Victoria)

The Morwell River is a perennial river of the West Gippsland catchment, in the West Gippsland and South Gippsland regions of the Australian state of Victoria.

== Location and features ==
Formed by the confluence of the West Branch and East Branch of the river, the Morwell River rises in the Strzelecki Ranges, below Boolarra South. The river flows generally in a northerly direction, joined by two minor tributaries before reaching its mouth to form confluence with the Latrobe River, south of Yallourn North. The river descends 156 metres (512 ft) over its 41-kilometre (25 mi) course. The lower reaches of the river has been diverted around open-cut coal mines by channels and pipelines until it enters the Latrobe River.

On 6 June 2012, a levee bank failure resulted in the flooding of the Yallourn coal mine causing damage to its infrastructure and cutting fuel supply to the adjacent power station.

== See also ==
- List of rivers of Australia § Victoria
