= List of companies of Singapore =

Location of Singapore

Singapore is a sovereign island country in maritime Southeast Asia. A global city, it has a developed market economy, based historically on extended entrepôt trade and more recently as a financial hub as well. Its economy has a reputation as free, innovative, competitive, dynamic and business-friendly from various multinational economists, think-tanks and organisations. Singapore is also consistently ranked as one of the least corrupt countries in the world, and the most transparent in all of Asia on the Corruption Perceptions Index (CPI).

Singapore is a wealthy country and is one of the original Four Asian Tigers, having also surpassed its peers in terms of GDP per capita, being the second highest in the world. Between 1965 and 1995, growth rates averaged around 6 per cent per annum, transforming the living standards of the population within a single generation. To start a business in Singapore, business owners have to register with the Accounting and Corporate Regulatory Authority (ACRA). ACRA is the national regulator and company registrar of business entities, accountants and service providers in Singapore.

== Largest firms ==
This list shows firms in the Fortune Global 500, which ranks firms by total revenue for 2024. Only the top five firms (if available) are included as a sample.

Rank	Image	Name	2024 revenues (USD billion)	Employees	Notes
19		Trafigura Group	244,280	12,479	Parent (Trafigura Beheer BV) is a Swiss/Dutch entity, but primary operations are from the Trafigura Group in Singapore.
198		Wilmar International	67,155	100,000	Wilmar is an agribusiness acting as a holding company for more than 400 subsidiaries.
425		Olam Group	35,953	62,548	Olam Group is a food and an agribusiness company founded in Nigeria, with primary operations and headquarters in Singapore.

== Notable firms ==
This list includes notable companies with primary headquarters located in the country. The industry and sector follow the Industry Classification Benchmark taxonomy. Organizations which have ceased operations are included and noted as defunct.

Notable companies Status: P=Private, S=State; A=Active, D=Defunct
Name	Industry	Sector	Headquarters	Founded	Notes	Status	
2C2P	Financials	Financial services	Singapore	2003	Money movement	P	A
77th Street	Consumer goods	Clothing & accessories	Singapore	1988	Defunct 2016	P	D
ABR Holdings	Financials	Real estate holding & development	Singapore	1978	Development of food retail properties	P	A
Aetos Security Management	Industrials	Business support services	Singapore	2004	Security services	P	A
Aftershock PC	Technology	Computer hardware & peripherals	Singapore	2012	Personal computers, laptops, gaming systems	P	A
Agoda	Consumer services	Travel & tourism	Singapore	2005	Travel agency	P	A
Akira	Consumer goods	Consumer electronics	Singapore	1984	Televisions, home appliances	P	A
Awfully Chocolate	Consumer goods	Food products	Singapore	1998	Confectionery	P	A
Ayam Brand	Consumer goods	Food products	Singapore	1892	Prepared foods	P	A
Bee Cheng Hiang	Consumer goods	Food products	Singapore	1933	Singaporean cuisine	P	A
Bengawan Solo	Consumer goods	Food products	Singapore	1979	Singaporean cuisine	P	A
BlueSG	Consumer services	Car rental	Singapore	2017	Electric car rental and charging	P	A
Boustead Singapore	Industrials	Business support services	Singapore	1828	Engineering	P	A
BreadTalk	Consumer goods	Food products	Singapore	2000	Bakery	P	A
CapitaLand	Financials	Real estate holding & development	Singapore	2000	Developer	P	A
Carousell	Technology	Software	Singapore	2012	E-commerce platform	P	A
Certis CISCO	Industrials	Business support services	Singapore	1958	Private security	P	A
Charles & Keith	Consumer goods	Clothing & accessories	Singapore	1996	Fashion, luxury items, footwear	P	A
China Aviation Oil	Oil & gas	Exploration & production	Singapore	1993		P	A
Circles.Life	Telecommunications	Fixed-line telecommunications	Singapore	2016	Telecom	P	A
City Developments Limited	Financials	Real estate holding & development	Singapore	1963	Developer	P	A
The Cocoa Trees	Consumer goods	Food products	Singapore	1991	Confectionery	P	A
Cold Storage	Consumer services	Food retailers & wholesalers	Singapore	1908	Supermarket chain	P	A
ComfortDelGro	Consumer services	Travel & tourism	Singapore	2003	Passenger transport	P	A
Courts Singapore	Consumer goods	Furniture	Singapore	1974	Electronics and furniture	P	A
Creative Technology	Consumer goods	Consumer electronics	Singapore	1981	Audio technologies, sound systems	P	A
DBS Bank	Financials	Banks	Singapore	1968	Bank	P	A
dnata Singapore	Industrials	Delivery services	Singapore	1997	Cargo and ground handling services, part of dnata (UAE)	P	A
Eu Yan Sang	Consumer services	Specialty retailers	Singapore	1879	Traditional Chinese medicine retailer	P	A
Far East Orchard	Consumer services	Hotels	Singapore	1967	Hotels, part of Far East Organization	P	A
Far East Organization	Financials	Real estate holding & development	Singapore	1962	Property development	P	A
FilmTack	Industrials	Building materials & fixtures	Singapore	1980	Glass tinting	P	A
Flextronics	Technology	Electronic components	Singapore	1964	OEM/ODM	P	A
Fraser and Neave	Consumer goods	Food products	Singapore	1883	Creator of Tiger Beer and 100plus	P	A
Frasers Property	Financials	Real estate holding & development	Singapore	1963	Property development	P	A
Gardenia Foods	Consumer goods	Food products	Singapore	1978	Bakery	P	A
Garena	Technology	Software	Singapore	2009	Game and software development	P	A
Genting Singapore	Consumer services	Travel & tourism	Singapore	1984	Hospitality and tourism	P	A
GIC	Conglomerates	–	Singapore	1981	State-owned holding company	S	A
GlobalRoam	Telecommunications	mobile telecommunications	Singapore	2001	information technology	P	A
Golden Agri-Resources	Consumer goods	Food producers	Singapore	1996	Palm oil	P	A
Grab	Technology	Internet	Singapore	2012	Car and taxi hailing service	P	A
Great Eastern Life	Financials	Life insurance	Singapore	1908	Life insurance	P	A
Haw Par Corporation	Consumer goods	Personal care	Singapore	1969	Inventor of Tiger Balm	P	A
The Hour Glass	Consumer services	Specialty retailers	Singapore	1979	Luxury watches retailer	P	A
Housing and Development Board	Financials	Real estate holding & development	Singapore	1960	State-owned developer	S	A
Hyflux	Industrials	Heavy construction	Singapore	1989	Defunct 2021	P	D
Japfa	Consumer goods	Food producers	Singapore	1971	Meat processing, dairy products	P	A
Jean Yip Group	Consumer Services	Specialized consumer services	Singapore	2004	Beauty salon chain	P	A
John Little	Consumer services	Broadline retailers	Singapore	1845	Defunct 2016, acquired by Robinson & Co.	P	D
Jurong Port	Industrials	Transportation services	Singapore	2001	Port operator	P	A
JTC Corporation	Financials	Real estate holding & development	Singapore	1968	State-owned developer	S	A
Keppel Corporation	Conglomerates	–	Singapore	1968	Financial, infrastructure, property	P	A
Killiney Kopitiam	Consumer services	Restaurants & bars	Singapore	1919	Café chain for Singaporean cuisine	P	A
Koka	Consumer goods	Food products	Singapore	1986	Prepared foods	P	A
Kopitiam	Consumer services	Restaurants & bars	Singapore	1988	Food court for Singaporean cuisine	P	A
Koufu	Consumer goods	Restaurants & bars	Singapore	2002	Food court chain	P	A
Lazada	Technology	Software	Singapore	2012	E-commerce platform	P	A
LKF Medical	Health Care	Pharmaceuticals and Biotechnology	Singapore	1928	Inventor and producer of Axe Brand Universal Oil	P	A
M1 Limited	Telecommunications	Fixed-line telecommunications	Singapore	1994	Telecom	P	A
Marshall Cavendish	Consumer services	Specialty retailers	Singapore	1968	Books	P	A
Mediacorp	Consumer services	Media	Singapore	1963	Diversified media holdings	P	A
MindChamps	Consumer services	Education	Singapore	1998	Education group	P	A
Mr Bean	Consumer goods	Food products	Singapore	1995	Singaporean cuisine and soy products	P	A
MyRepublic	Telecommunications	Fixed line telecommunications	Singapore	2011	Telecom	P	A
NCS Group	Technology	Information technology services	Singapore	1981	Information technology consultancy services, part of Singtel	P	A
Neptune Orient Lines	Industrials	Marine transportation	Singapore	1958	Defunct 2020, merged with CMA CGM (France)	P	D
NETS	Financials	Finance & credit services	Singapore	1985	Electronic payment services and financial processing services	P	A
Northstar Group	Financials	Equity investment instruments	Singapore	2003	Investment holdings	P	A
NTUC FairPrice	Consumer services	Food retailers & wholesalers	Singapore	1973	Supermarket chain	P	A
O' Coffee Club	Consumer services	Restaurants & bars	Singapore	1991	Café chain	P	A
OCBC Bank	Financials	Banks	Singapore	1932	Bank	P	A
Olam International	Consumer goods	Food producers	Singapore	1989	Agri-business, majority owned by Temasek Holdings	P	A
Old Chang Kee	Consumer goods	Food products	Singapore	1956	Singaporean cuisine	P	A
Omni United	Industrials	Tires	Singapore	2003	Tire manufacturer	P	A
On Cheong Jewellery	Consumer services	Specialty retailers	Singapore	1936	Jewelry	P	A
Osim International	Consumer services	Specialty retailers	Singapore	1980	Healthy lifestyle retailer	P	A
Oyika	Energy	Renewable energy equipment	Singapore	2018	Electric vehicles battery-as-a-service, battery swapping services	P	A
Popular Holdings	Consumer services	Specialty retailers	Singapore	1924	Books	P	A
POSB Bank	Financials	Banks	Singapore	1877	Bank, part of DBS Bank	P	A
Prima Taste	Consumer goods	Food products	Singapore	1998	Prepared foods	P	A
Prime Supermarket	Consumer services	Food retailers & wholesalers	Singapore	1984	Supermarket chain	P	A
PSA International	Industrials	Transportation services	Singapore	1964	Port operator	P	A
Razer	Technology	Computer hardware & peripherals	Singapore	2005	Laptops, gaming systems	P	A
Renewable Energy Corporation	Industrials	Electrical components & equipment	Singapore	1996	Solar energy, solar panels manufacturer	P	A
Robinsons & Co.	Consumer services	Broadline retailers	Singapore	1858	Operates a chain of department stores	P	A
SATS Ltd	Industrials	Transportation services	Singapore	1972	Airline support	P	A
SATS Security Services	Industrials	Transportation services	Singapore	1965	Subsidiary of SATS Ltd	P	A
SBS Transit	Consumer services	Travel & tourism	Singapore	1973	Passenger transportation	P	A
Scoot	Consumer services	Airlines	Singapore	2011	Low-cost airline	P	A
Sea Limited	Conglomerates	–	Singapore	2019	Technology, e-commerce	P	A
Seatrium	Industrials	Industrial engineering	Singapore	1963	Offshore infrastructures, shipbuilding and energy solutions, subsidiary of Temasek Holdings	P	A
Secretlab	Consumer goods	Furniture	Singapore	2014	Gaming chairs	P	A
Sembcorp	Industrials	Diversified industrials	Singapore	1963	Power generation, urban and utility development, waste management, subsidiary of Temasek Holdings	P	A
Senoko Energy	Utilities	Conventional electricity	Singapore	1977	Operates the Senoko Power Station	P	A
SGAG	Consumer services	Broadcasting & entertainment	Singapore	2012	Social media website and news media company	P	A
Shaw Organisation	Media	Entertainment & media	Singapore	1925	Film distribution and cinemas company	P	A
Sheng Siong	Consumer services	Food retailers & wholesalers	Singapore	1985	Supermarket chain	P	A
Shopee	Technology	Software	Singapore	2015	E-commerce platform	P	A
SIA Engineering Company	Industrials	Aerospace	Singapore	1992	Aircraft MRO services, subsidiary of the Singapore Airlines	P	A
SilkAir	Consumer services	Airlines	Singapore	1992	Defunct 2021, merged with Singapore Airlines	P	D
Singapore Airlines	Consumer services	Airlines	Singapore	1947		P	A
Singapore Airlines Cargo	Industrials	Airlines	Singapore	2001	Cargo airline, part of Singapore Airlines	P	A
Singapore Exchange	Financials	Investment services	Singapore	1999	Stock exchange	P	A
Singapore Petroleum Company	Oil & gas	Exploration & production	Singapore	1969		P	A
Singapore Pools	Consumer services	Gambling	Singapore	1968	Lottery, part of the Tote Board under the Ministry of Finance	S	A
Singapore Post	Industrials	Delivery services	Singapore	1819		P	A
Singapore Power Group	Utilities	Conventional electricity	Singapore	1995	Electricity and gas distribution, part of Temasek Holdings	S	A
Singapore Press Holdings	Financials	Real estate holding & development	Singapore	1984	Defunct 2022, merged with Cuscaden Peak	P	D
Singlife	Financials	Full line insurance	Singapore	2017	Insurance	P	A
Singtel	Telecommunications	Mobile telecommunications	Singapore	1992	Mobile network, SGX: Z74	P	A
SMRT Corporation	Consumer services	Travel & tourism	Singapore	2000	Public transportation	P	A
SPH Media Trust	Media	Publishing	Singapore	2021	Publisher	P	A
ST Engineering	Industrials	Diversified industrials	Singapore	1967	Aerospace, defense, electronics and shipbuilding	P	A
Standard Chartered Singapore	Financials	Banks	Singapore	1859	Bank, subsidiary of Standard Chartered (UK)	P	A
StarHub	Telecommunications	Fixed-line telecommunications	Singapore	1998	Telecom	P	A
Super Hi International Holding	Consumer services	Restaurants & bars	Singapore	2022	Holding company for Haidilao branches outside of China.	P	A
Surbana Jurong	Industrials	Business support services	Singapore	2015	Real estate engineering consultancy, part of Temasek Holdings	S	A
Systems on Silicon Manufacturing	Technology	Semiconductors	Singapore	1998	Semiconductor manufacturing	P	A
Tangs	Consumer services	Broadline retailers	Singapore	1932	Department stores	P	A
Tee Yih Jia	Consumer goods	Food products	Singapore	1969	Food production	P	A
Temasek Holdings	Conglomerates	–	Singapore	1974	State-owned holding company	S	A
Thakral Corporation	Conglomerates	–	Singapore	1995	Manufacturing, logistics and property	P	A
Tiger Airways Holdings	Consumer services	Airlines	Singapore	2007	Defunct 2016, merged with Singapore Airlines	P	D
Twelve Cupcakes	Consumer goods	Food products	Singapore	2011	Confectionery	P	D
TWG Tea	Consumer goods	Beverages	Singapore	2007	Tea	P	A
U2opia Mobile	Technology	Software	Singapore	2010	Fonetwish mobile application developer	P	A
United Overseas Bank	Financials	Banks	Singapore	1935	Bank	P	A
UTAC Group	Technology	Semiconductors	Singapore	1997	Semiconductor assembly, packaging and testing	P	A
Vertex Venture Holdings	Financials	Equity investment instruments	Singapore	1988	Investment holdings	P	A
Wilmar	Consumer goods	Food producers	Singapore	1991	Food processing, biodiesel	P	A
Ya Kun Kaya Toast	Consumer services	Restaurants & bars	Singapore	1944	Café chain for Singaporean cuisine	P	A
Yeo Hiap Seng (Yeo's)	Consumer goods	Beverages	Singapore	1900	Soft drinks, part of Far East Organization	P	A
YHI International	Industrials	Tires	Singapore	1948	Tire manufacturer	P	A
Yili Vegetation and Trading	Consumer goods	Food producers	Singapore	1996	Agricultural company that specialises in cultivating vegetables and mushrooms.	P	A
Zalora	Technology	Software	Singapore	2012	E-commerce platform	P	A

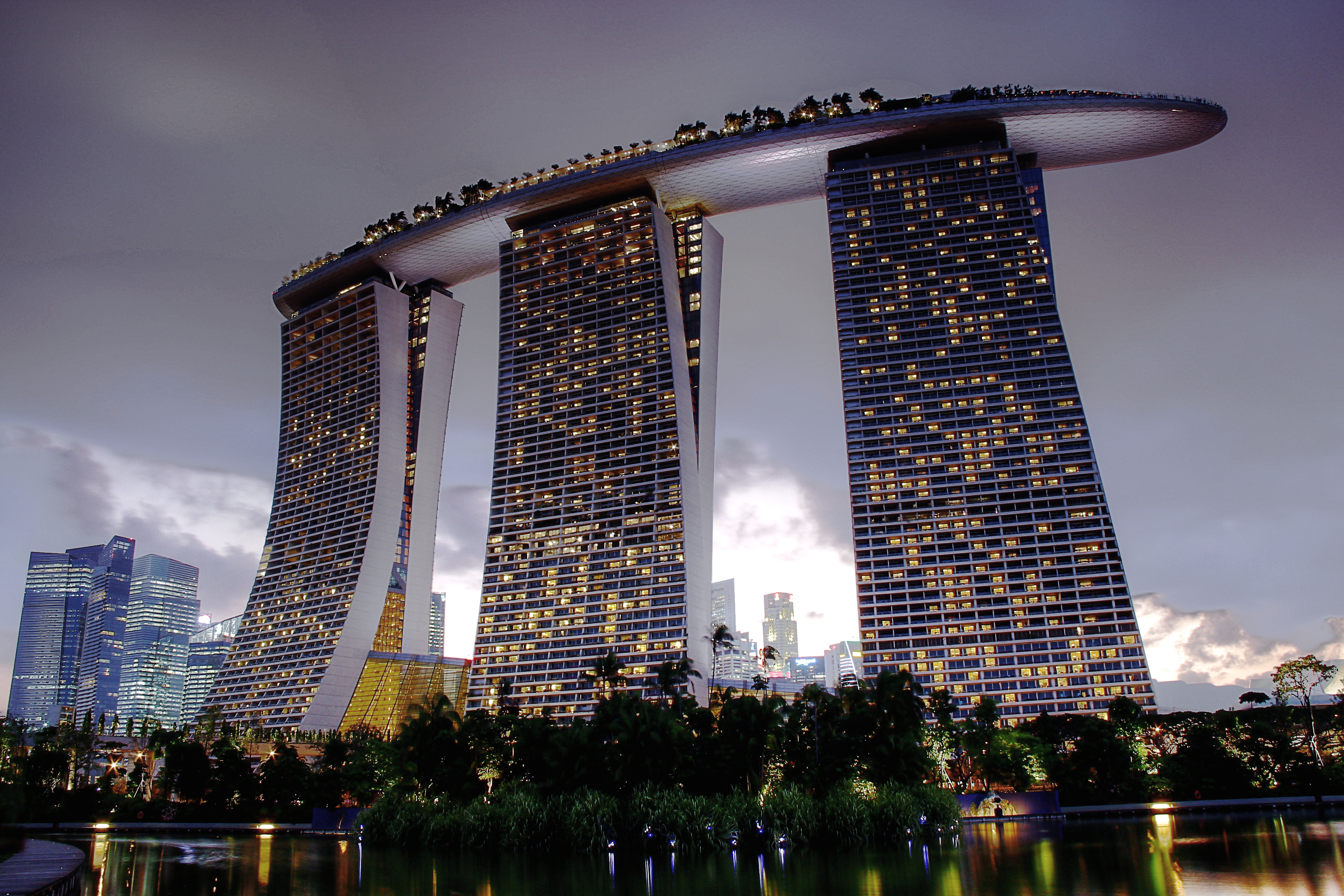
The integrated resort of Marina Bay Sands, that opened in 2010, is one of the world's most photographed buildings.

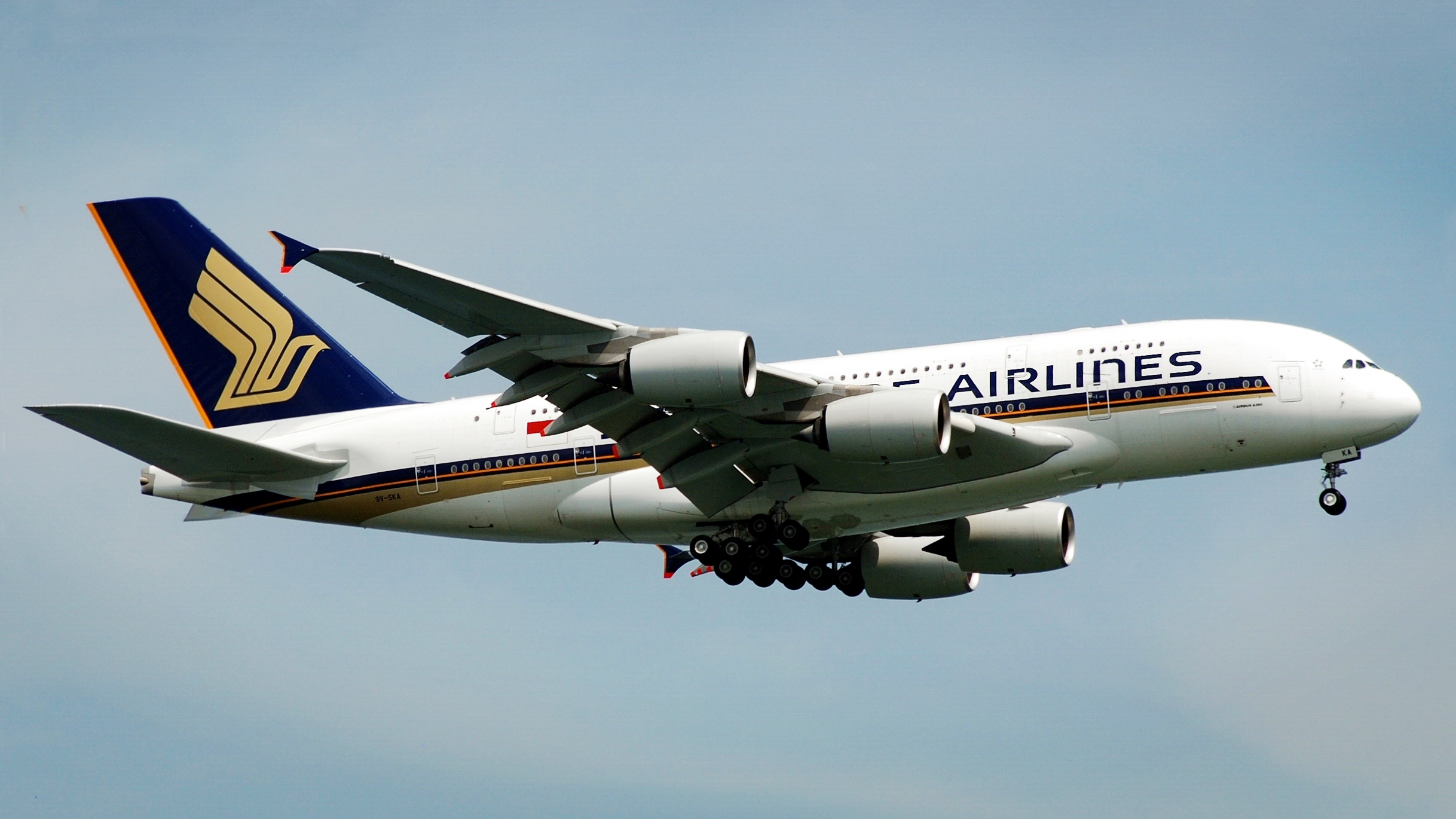
Singapore Airlines's Airbus A380 landing at Singapore Changi Airport

== See also ==
- Economy of Singapore
- List of largest companies in Singapore
- List of companies listed on the Singapore Exchange
- Straits Times Index
