= List of largest companies in Singapore =

This article lists the largest companies in Singapore in terms of their revenue, net profit and total assets, according to the American business magazines Fortune and Forbes.

== 2024 Fortune list ==
This list displays the top 20 Singaporean companies in the Fortune Southeast Asia 500, which ranks the largest companies in Southeast Asia by annual revenue. The figures below are given in millions of US dollars and are for the fiscal year 2023. Also listed are the headquarters location, net profit, number of employees worldwide and industry sector of each company.

Rank	Name	Industry	Revenue (USD millions)	Profits (USD millions)	Employees
1	Trafigura	Commodity	244,280	7,393	12,479
2	Wilmar International	Food production	67,155	1,525	100,000
3	Olam International	Agriculture	35,953	208	65,980
4	Flex Ltd.	Electronics	26,415	1,006	148,115
5	DBS Bank	Banking	25,608	7,495	40,770
6	United Overseas Bank	Banking	19,733	4,254	32,340
7	OCBC Bank	Banking	18,418	5,229	33,330
8	Singapore Airlines	Airline	14,141	1,989	16,643
9	Sea Ltd	E-commerce	13,064	163	62,70
10	Singtel	Telecommunications	10,648	1,620	24,070
11	Golden Agri-Resources	Agriculture	9,756	198	100,800
12	ST Engineering	Technology	7,523	437	26,779
13	Yanlord Land Group	Real estate	6,130	-132	11,530
14	Singapore Power	Utilities	5,443	752	3,584
15	Seatrium	Shipbuilding	5,431	-1,502	22,747
16	PSA International	Logistics	5,285	1,089	49,000
17	Sembcorp	Utilities	5,244	702	5,063
18	Keppel Ltd.	Real estate	5,188	3,029	12,245
19	Housing and Development Board	Real estate	4,503	12	5,516
20	Japfa	Agriculture	4,429	-31	37,668

== 2024 Forbes list ==
This list is based on the Forbes Global 2000, which ranks the world's 2,000 largest publicly traded companies. The Forbes list takes into account a multitude of factors, including the revenue, net profit, total assets and market value of each company; each factor is given a weighted rank in terms of importance when considering the overall ranking. The table below also lists the headquarters location and industry sector of each company. The figures are in billions of US dollars and are for the year 2023/24. All 10 companies from Singapore are listed.

Rank	Forbes 2000 rank	Name	Headquarters	Revenue (billions US$)	Profit (billions US$)	Assets (billions US$)	Value (billions US$)	Industry
1	138	DBS Bank	Singapore	26.2	7.5	560.7	75.3	Banking
2	219	Oversea-Chinese Banking	Singapore	18.6	5.2	440.8	48.3	Banking
3	240	United Overseas Bank	Singapore	20.2	4.3	396.9	37.6	Banking
4	462	Wilmar International	Singapore	67.2	1.5	61.8	14.7	Food production
5	619	Singtel	Singapore	10.6	2.4	34.5	29.7	Telecommunication
6	697	Singapore Airlines	Singapore	14.1	2.0	33.4	15.0	Airline
7	1254	Keppel Ltd.	Singapore	5.2	3.0	20.3	8.9	Electronics
8	1254	Olam International	Singapore	35.9	0.2	25.6	3.3	Agriculture
9	1777	CapitaMall Trust	Singapore	1.2	0.6	18.8	9.9	Real estate
10	1999	CapitaLand	Singapore	2.2	0.1	25.9	10.0	Real estate

== See also ==
- Economy of Singapore
- List of companies of Singapore
- List of largest companies by revenue
