= Stella (singer) =

Singaporean singer (born 1980)

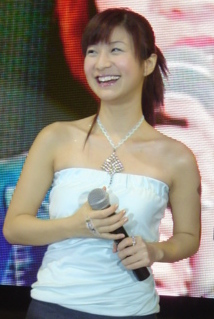
Image of Stella

Stella Huang (born Stella Ng on 17 December 1980) is a Singaporean singer, actress and businesswoman.

== Early life ==
Huang was educated at Crescent Girls' School, Anglo-Chinese Junior College, and the National University of Singapore.

== Career ==
Apart from her performances as a recording artist, she also acts in a variety of television serials in Taiwan and Singapore. Some of her serials have included a lead role as Sam in MediaCorp's Beautiful Trio with award-winning veteran actresses Huang Biren and Ivy Lee, and a role in the China action film Kung Fu Girls, where she also performed the theme song of the soundtrack to the film. She starred as the lead character in the 2002 television series Marmalade Boy, for which she also sang the theme song, "溫室的花 Wēnshì de Huā (Greenhouse Flower)".

In 2017, she formed a children musical group, Bossa Baby, with five other musicians producing children songs in the bossa nova style.

In September 2023, she revealed that she is working as the head of partnerships and activations at Vantage Pointe, a business consultant firm.

== Ventures ==
In 2005, Huang took a break from show business. She set up a specialty cake shop in Taipei under the Awfully Chocolate franchise, investing US$200,000 into the business with a partner.

In 2007, Awfully Chocolate terminated the franchise and sued Stella's company. A court order required Stella to pay approximately $224,000 but due to non-payment by her, the cake firm issued a letter of statutory demand to her in January 2009.

Huang set up her own bakery, Black As Chocolate (BAC), after the termination of her franchisee licence from Awfully Chocolate. As of 2018, the bakery was being managed by her (now ex-) husband's family.

== Personal life ==
In August 2011, Huang married Taiwanese businessman Armstrong Yeh ({葉學澤) in Vancouver, Canada. She gave birth to a son named Ashton on 8 August 2012. In 2018, she migrated to Vancouver, Canada for her son's educational development. Huang and Yeh ended their marriage in 2019 and after the divorce, Huang and her son moved back to Singapore.

In August 2023, Huang announced her three-year relationship with Englishman Jon (born 1973), whom she met on a dating app. Jon reportedly works in the pharmaceutical field and has a pair of twins from a previous marriage.

== Discography ==
=== Studio albums ===
| Date of release | Title |
|---|---|
| 2 February 2001 | Waiting (等) |
| 9 September 2002 | Courier of Love (快遞愛情) |

=== Compilation albums ===
| Date of release | Title |
|---|---|
| 4 June 2004 | Rhapsody (西班牙狂想曲) |

== Filmography ==
=== Television series ===
| Year | Title | Role | Notes |
|---|---|---|---|
| 2002 | Marmalade Boy | | Also performed theme song "Greenhouse Flower" ("溫室的花") |
| 2004 | Running with Seuars | | |
| 2004 | Beautiful Trio | Samantha | |
| 2004 | Baseball Love Affair (追風少年) | | |
| 2005 | Beyond the aXis of Truth II | Zhou Xingxing / Xing Shufen | |
| 2012 | Gentle Mercy (溫柔的慈悲) | | |

=== Film ===
| Year | Title | Role | Notes |
|---|---|---|---|
| 2004 | Karate Girls | | Also performed theme song |

== Awards and nominations ==
| Year | Award | Category | Nominated work | Result |
|---|---|---|---|---|
| 2001 | Singapore Hit Awards | M1 Most Promising Newcomer | Waiting | Won |
