= Jemena =

Australian energy infrastructure company

SGSP (Australia) Assets Pty Ltd
- Trade name: Jemena
- Company type: Private subsidiary
- Industry: Utility
- Predecessor: AlintaGas Ltd; Alinta Limited
- Founded: 1995
- Headquarters: Melbourne, Victoria, Australia
- Key people: Mr Jiang Longhua, Chairman; David Gillespie [Managing Director]
- Services: Electric power transmission and distribution Natural gas transmission and distribution
- Owner: State Grid Corporation of China (60%); Singapore Power (40%)
- Number of employees: ~1300
- Parent: State Grid Corporation of China
- Website: www.jemena.com.au

SGSP (Australia) Assets Pty Ltd (SGSPAA), trading as Jemena, is an Australian company that owns, manages or operates energy infrastructure assets in the eastern states of Australia including Queensland and New South Wales, and gas pipelines and gas and electricity distribution networks in Victoria and the Northern Territory. It is 60% owned by State Grid Corporation of China and 40% by Singapore Power.

== History ==
In January 1995, the vertical monopolist energy supplier, the State Energy Commission of Western Australia, was dis-aggregated into separate gas and electricity corporations, leading to the formation of AlintaGas. On 13 July 2000 legislation was passed by the Parliament of Western Australia for the sale of AlintaGas, which listed on the Australian Stock Exchange (ASX) on 17 October 2000. On 8 May 2003 AlintaGas Ltd changed its name to Alinta Limited. Alinta acquired infrastructure assets and the Agility business from AGL through a combination of merger and demerger transactions on 25 October 2006.

Alinta was acquired on 31 August 2007 by a consortium comprising Singapore Power International (SPI), the largest utility company in Singapore, and Australia's second-largest investment bank, Babcock & Brown Infrastructure (BBI) and Babcock & Brown Power (BBP) with a bid of A$13.9 billion, outbidding a bid by Macquarie Bank. After acquisition, the Alinta businesses were split up. The majority of eastern assets were transferred to Alinta AGL, an Alinta subsidiary, which on 4 August 2008 changed its name to Jemena. Later, ownership of Jemena passed to Singapore Power International, and its name was changed to SPI (Australia) Assets Pty Ltd. In 2014, State Grid Corporation of China acquired a 60% stake in Jemena, and the company's name was changed to SGSP (Australia) Assets Pty Ltd (SGSPAA). The company continues to trade as Jemena.

== Assets ==
Jemena's main assets and activities are:

- An asset management business in the eastern States
- Colongra gas transmission and storage facility, New South Wales
- Jemena Gas Networks gas distribution network, New South Wales
- ActewAGL gas distribution network, Australian Capital Territory (50%)
- ActewAGL electricity distribution network, Australian Capital Territory (50%)
- Jemena Electricity Networks electricity distribution network, Victoria
- Eastern Gas Pipeline, New South Wales and Victoria
- VicHub, Victoria
- Queensland Gas Pipeline
- Northern Gas Pipeline
- Zinfra Pty Ltd, an engineering, construction and maintenance service provider to the utility infrastructure sector. (100%)

== See also ==
- Western Power
- Alinta
