= Eastern Gas Pipeline =

Eastern Gas pipeline

Location
- Country: Australia
- State: Victoria and New South Wales
- Direction: northeast

General information
- Type: natural gas
- Owner: Jemena
- Operator: Jemena
- Commissioned: 2000

Technical information
- Length: 797 km (495 mi)
- Diameter: 457.2 mm (18 in)
- Compressor stations: Longford, Orbost, Mila (near Bombala), Michelago

The Eastern Gas Pipeline (EGP) is a 797 km (495 mi) natural gas pipeline. It is a key supply artery between the Gippsland Basin in Victoria and New South Wales, Australia. The EGP is currently operated by Jemena.

The EGP supplies more than half the gas consumed in New South Wales and supports consumers in Sydney and regional centres, including Bairnsdale, Cooma, Canberra, Nowra, Bomaderry and Wollongong. Gas is fed to the EGP at Longford and Orbost, and by the VicHub interconnect facility.

Capacity up to 2016 was 106 PJ per annum, and during 2016 was increased by 22 PJ per annum. Current capacity in 2018 was 350+ TJ per day.

== Pipeline users ==
A major user of the pipeline is AGL, who have contracted capacity from the pipeline for AGL's customers in the Australian Capital Territory and New south Wales.

Industrial EGP customers include BlueScope at Port Kembla.

Power generation EGP customers include Marubeni’s power station at Smithfield, EnergyAustralia’s power station at Tallawarra, and Alinta Energy’s Bairnsdale power station.

== Route and branches ==
The main pipeline is 797 km (495 mi) from Longford to Horsley Park.

Section / Lateral	Length	Diameter
Victoria
VicHub Pipeline	2.3 km (1.4 mi)	355.6 mm (14.00 in)/273 mm (10.7 in)
Longford to Victoria/New South Wales border	276.7 km (171.9 mi)	457.2 mm (18.00 in)
Bairnsdale Main Valve to Bairnsdale City Gate	2.7 km (1.7 mi)	168.3 mm (6.63 in)
Longford suction pipeline from Esso Longford Gas Plant to Longford Compressor Station	2.4 km (1.5 mi)	610 mm (24 in)
New South Wales
Victoria/New South Wales border to Horsley Park	519.8 km (323.0 mi)	457.2 mm (18.00 in)
Port Kembla lateral	6.6 km (4.1 mi)	219.1 mm (8.63 in)
Smithfield lateral	9.6 km (6.0 mi)	219.1 mm (8.63 in)
Wilton lateral	4 km (2.5 mi)	323.9 mm (12.75 in)

== History and construction ==
Survey work and land access negotiations were undertaken by LandPartners.

The EGP project was initiated by BHP Petroleum and West Coast Energy. Design and construction were undertaken by Duke Energy. The initial design capacity was 65 PJ per annum, with an operating pressure of 14.9 MPa.

The pipeline was commissioned in 2000 and owned and operated by Duke Energy. Estimated cost was AUD450M.

API 5L X70 and X65 grade steel pipe with a fusion-bonded epoxy (FBE) coating was used. 90 kT of pipe was used for the pipeline. 27.7 kT of this was processed by OneSteel Oil and Gas from BlueScope PS5200 pipe steel.

Ownership passed to Alinta in April 2004 when Alinta purchased Duke Energy's assets in Australia and New Zealand.

Jemena took ownership and control in 2007.

In 2008 a midline compressor was commissioned at Mila, near Bombala, New South Wales, increasing capacity by 15%. Engineering constraints included snow zone operating conditions. Capacity was then 98 PJ per annum.

Local Rural Fire Service personnel are given response training by Jemena.

The Wilton lateral was commissioned in 2016.

Planning for a compressor upgrade commenced in 2013. In 2016 capacity was increased by 20%, 22 PJ per year, by the addition of two new midline compressor stations, at Michelago, and at Orbost.
