= Mr. Bean (disambiguation) =

Mr. Bean is a British comedy television programme.

Mr. Bean may also refer to:

== Mr. Bean franchise ==
- Mr. Bean (character), the central character of the series, played by Rowan Atkinson
- "Mr. Bean" (Mr. Bean episode), the 1990 pilot episode of the programme
- Mr. Bean: The Animated Series, since 2002
- Bean (film), a 1997 British–American comedy film
- Mr. Bean's Holiday, a 2007 British comedy film

== Other uses ==
- Mr Bean (company), a Singaporean soy milk and soybean curd retailer

== See also ==
- Bean (name)
