= Greenfields (dairy company) =

Indonesian dairy company

Coordinates: 8.000023°S 112.501287°E

PT Greenfields

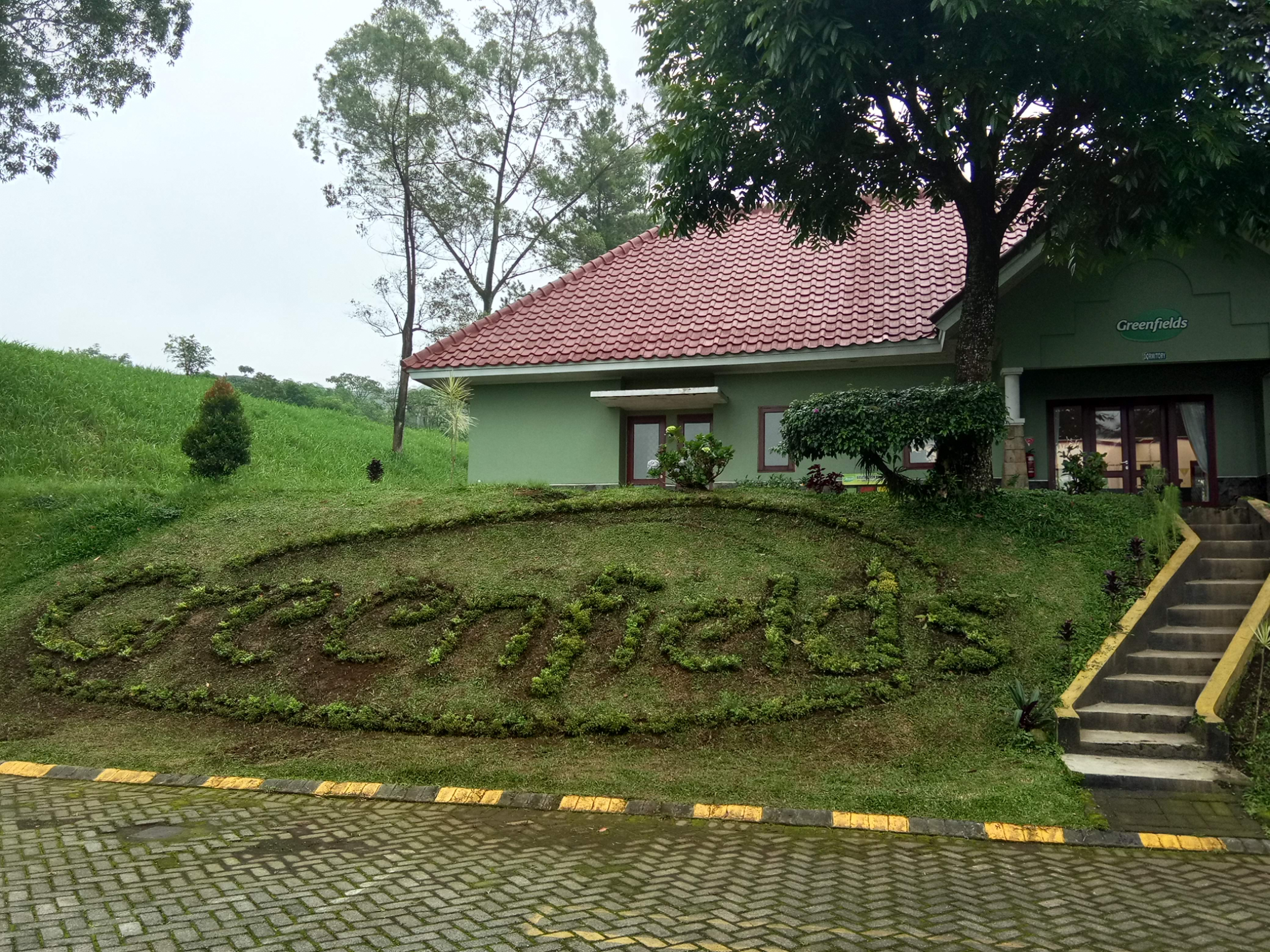
- Headquarters of Greenfields
- Company type: Private company limited by shares
- Industry: Dairy
- Founded: 14 March 1997; 29 years ago
- Headquarters: Malang, Indonesia
- Area served: Southeast Asia
- Products: Dairy products
- Brands: Greenfields Fresh Milk; Greenfields UHT; Greenfields Fresh Cheese; Greenfields Fresh Stirred Yogurt; Greenfields Yogurt Drink; Greenfields Whipping Cream
- Parent: TPG Inc., Northstar Group and Japfa
- Website: www.greenfieldsdairy.com

Greenfields is a large dairy company based in Malang, Indonesia. Greenfields has farms and a factory at the hillside of Mount Kawi in Malang Regency and in Blitar Regency.

The company was founded in 1997. Greenfields is a popular milk brand in Indonesia, Singapore, Malaysia, Hong Kong, Brunei, and the Philippines.

== History ==
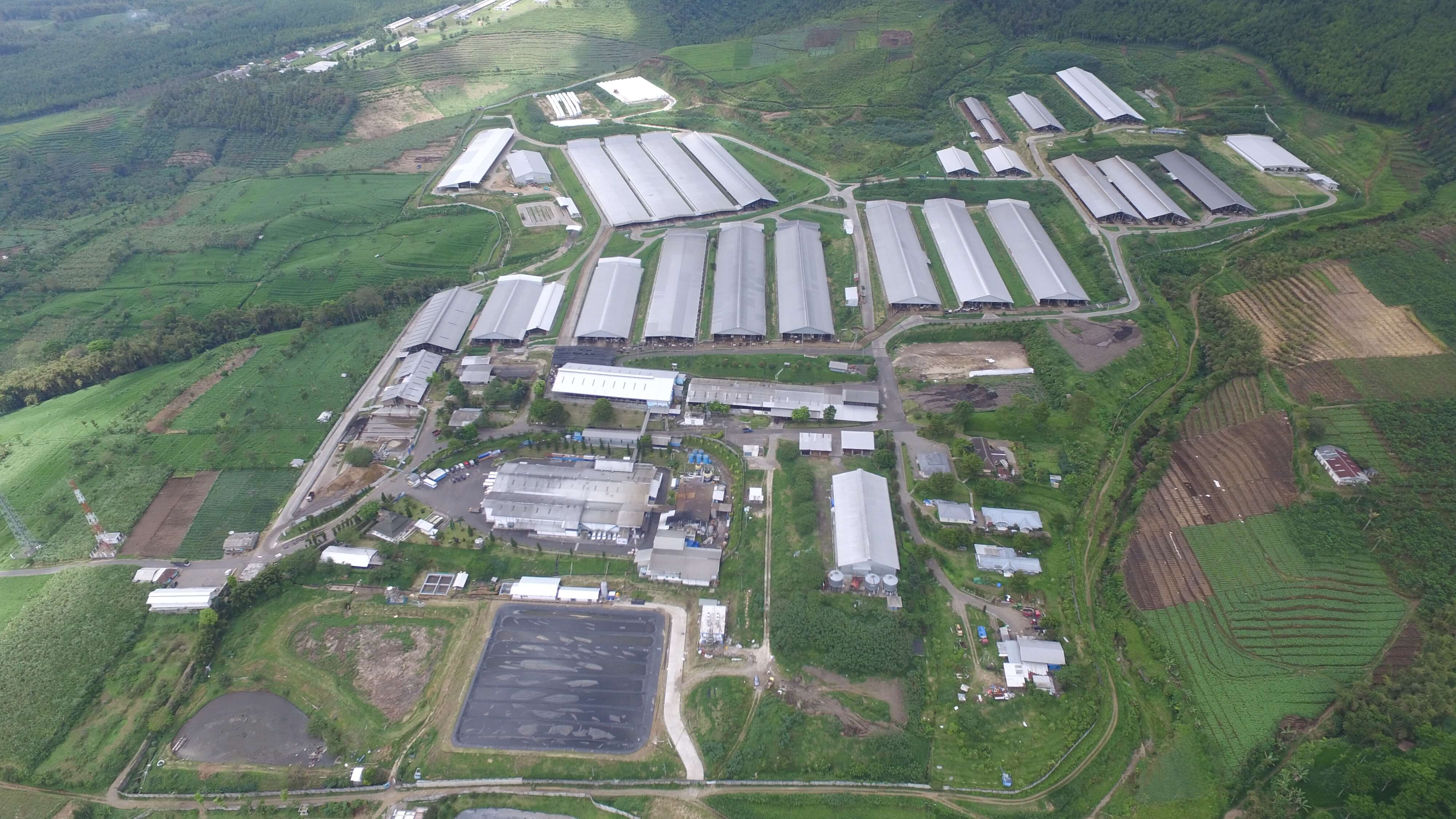
Aerial of Greenfields Factory

PT Greenfields Indonesia was created by a group of Australian and Indonesian business people who had expertise in the field of agribusiness. In 1997, the company began by developing farms in Babadan Village, Mount Kawi, East Java.

The company later opened another dairy farm in Blitar. The Indonesian Minister of Industry, Airlangga Hartarto commented on the company's contribution to the local economy and the fact that developing dairy farming helps to reduce reliance on imported products. By this stage in 2018, the company was also exporting approximately 20% of their products to other countries in the region, such as Hong Kong, Singapore, Malaysia, the Philippines and Brunei. This expansion occurred as the Indonesian government had stated a desire to increase domestic production of fresh milk.

PT Greenfields Indonesia (along with Greenfields Dairy Malaysia and Greenfields Dairy Hong Kong Limited) was a subsidiary of Greenfields Dairy Singapore. In December 2020, Japfa who owned the holding company Greenfields Dairy Singapore, agreed a conditional share purchase agreement which ultimately reduced their stake in the company. The sale was completed in 2021. As a result of the deal, TPG and Northstar Group owned 80% and Japna owned 20%.

The company invested in sustainability improvements from 2020, fitting a solar power system expected to reduce carbon dioxide emissions. By this stage the company had 16,000 heads of cattle. Research published in 2025 suggested that the number of cows had increased to 19,000. In Malang the farm area owned is 50 hectares and in Blitar it is 172 hectares with the ability to create 100 million litres of milk per year, at full capacity.

== Products ==
- Fresh milk.
- UHT milk, including in smaller sizes (200ml and 250ml).
- Stirred yogurt, in plain and flavoured varieties (500g and 1kg).
- Yogurt drinks.
- Whipped cream.
- Cheese.
