= Senoko Power Station =

Power station in Singapore

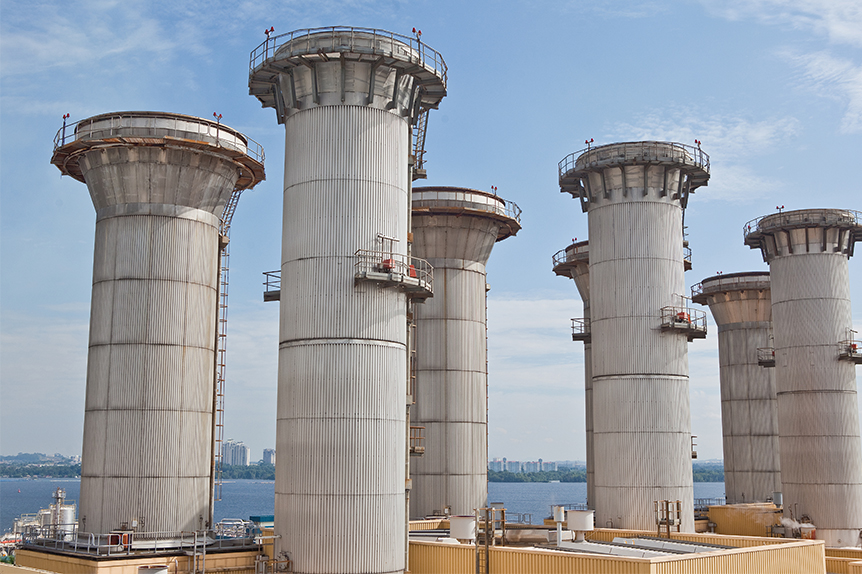
- Senoko Power Station located on the northern coast of Singapore.
- Official name: Senoko Power Station
- Country: Singapore
- Location: Senoko, Sembawang
- Coordinates: 1°28′N 103°48′E
- Status: Operational
- Commission date: 1976
- Construction cost: SGD 1.2 billion
- Owner: Lion Power Holdings (Senoko Energy)

Thermal power station
- Primary fuel: Natural gas
- Secondary fuel: Fuel Oil
- Tertiary fuel: None
- Combined cycle?: Yes
- Cogeneration?: No

Power generation
- Units operational: 7
- Make and model: Hitachi Deregistered; Siemens; Alstom; MHI
- Nameplate capacity: 2800 MW (authorised)

External links
- Website: senokoenergy.com
- 2x Hitachi Thermal power plant has been Deregistered since 2018 and is scheduled for decommission.

The Senoko Power Station is the largest power station in Singapore. It is located in Senoko, Sembawang and was commissioned in 1976. It is owned by Senoko Energy Pte Ltd, formerly known as Senoko Power Ltd.

== Description ==
The Senoko Power Station is located at a former British Naval Base in Sembawang, Singapore.

The Steam Plant Stage I, which was completed in 1976, comprised three steam thermal plants with 120 MW of capacity each. The Steam Plant Stage II, which was completed in 1979, comprised three steam thermal plants with 250 MW of capacity each. The Steam Plant Stage III which was completed in 1983 comprises another two steam thermal plants with 250 MW of capacity each. In 1992, Stage III 250 MW boilers were modified with gas burners to enable it to fire both Natural Gas and Fuel Oil.

In the 1990s, it was converted from a gas turbine power plant to a combined cycle plant. The combined cycle plants include combined cycle plants 1 and 2, combined cycle plants 3 to 5 and combined cycle plants 6 and 7. The Gas Plant Stage I was an open cycle plant with 4 open cycle gas turbines with 131 MW capacity when commissioned in 1991. In 1994, the 4 open cycle gas turbines were converted into two blocks of combined cycle plants with 425 MW of capacity each and renamed CCP 1 and 2. In 2010, Gas Turbine GT22 of CCP 2 was upgraded with new vanes and blades for its stage 1 and 2

The combined cycle plants 3 to 5 were completed and fully operational by 2004 with 365 MW of capacity each, which involved the repowering of the Stage I oil-fired steam thermal plant. The combined cycle plants 6 and 7 were completed and commissioned by 2012 with 431 MW of capacity each, which involved the repowering of the Stage II oil-fired steam thermal plant.

In its early years, the plant used crude oil as fuel to power its turbines; however, this was replaced by natural gas piped from Terengganu on the east coast of Peninsular Malaysia after 1992. Oil, however, is still used as a back-up.

== History ==
The Senoko Power Station originally began operations in 1976. It was built by PUB with plans starting as early as 1971. Two additional stages of construction were conducted with it being officially completed in 1983 as Singapore's largest power station.

In the 1990s, the Senoko Power Station was converted from an open-cycle gas turbine power plant to Singapore's first combined cycle plant.

In 1992, a fire broke out at one of its plants resulting in a major power outage in the island.

Based on a mutual agreement between Malaysia and Singapore on electricity, the plant is linked by a submarine cable to the Sultan Iskandar Power Station in Pasir Gudang, Johor. In the event of a power outage in Peninsular Malaysia, the plant would supply electricity to the Johor plant. Likewise, if there is a power outage in Singapore, the Johor plant would supply electricity to Senoko.

The plant's only standing concrete chimney which belongs to Stage 3, at 182 metres high, is the tallest structure in the northern part of Singapore and one of the tallest structures on the island. It is clearly visible across the Tebrau Straits and in most parts of Johor Bahru. The plant's second chimney which belongs to Stage 2 was demolished in July 2010 as part of the repowering process.

On 5 September 2008, Temasek Holdings sold Senoko Energy Pte Ltd to Lion Power Holdings for S$3.65 billion. Lion Power is owned by a consortium led by Japan's Marubeni Corporation. Other members of the consortium are GDF Suez of France, The Kansai Electric Power Company, Kyūshū Electric Power Company and Japan Bank for International Cooperation.

Plant development stage	Commission date	Status	Installation cost (in S$)	Capacity	Plant type	Turbine manufacturer
Steam Stage I	1976	Decommissioned; Repowered to CCP 3 – 5	600,000,000	3 x 120 MW	Steam Thermal Plant	Hitachi
Steam Stage II	October 1978 April 1979 September 1979	Decommissioned Repowered to CCP 6 – 7	600,000,000	3 x 250 MW	Steam Thermal Plant	Hitachi
Steam Stage III	June 1983; November 1983	Operational	400,000,000	2 x 250 MW	Steam Thermal Plant	Hitachi
Gas Stage I	1990; 1991	Upgraded to CCP 1 & 2		4 x 131 MW	Open Cycle Plant	Siemens
CCP 1 & 2	1994	Operational		2 x 425 MW	Combined-Cycle Plant	Siemens
CCP 3 – 5	February 2002; July 2004; December 2004	Operational		3 x 365 MW	Combined-Cycle Plant	Alstom
CCP 6 – 7	2012	Operational	1,000,000,000	2 x 431 MW	Combined-Cycle Plant	MHI
