= Alinta =

Australian energy generator and retailer

Alinta Limited
- Type: Public
- Traded as: ASX: AAN
- Industry: Energy
- Predecessor: State Energy Commission of Western Australia
- Founded: January 1995
- Defunct: 2007
- Successor: Alinta Energy
- Headquarters: Perth, Western Australia
- Key people: Leonard Gill (Chairman); Jeff Dimery (CEO)
- Products: Electricity, Gas, Oil

Alinta Limited was an Australian energy infrastructure company. It has grown from a small, Western Australia–based gas distributor and retailer to the largest energy infrastructure company in Australia. It was bought in 2007 by a consortium including Singapore Power and various parties which include the now defunct Babcock & Brown funds.

Alinta Limited was known as Westnet Infrastructure Group Limited for a time. In March 2011, due to a deleveraging transaction by the TPG Group, Alinta became Alinta Energy. Alinta Energy was acquired by Hong Kong–based Chow Tai Fook Enterprises in 2017. The successor to the retail gas business is now called Alinta Energy.

== History ==
In January 1995, the vertical monopolist energy supplier, the State Energy Commission of Western Australia, was disaggregated into separate gas and electricity corporations, leading to the formation of AlintaGas. The word Alinta is derived from the word for flame in a traditional language of the Yorta Yorta nation from Victoria. On 13 July 2000 legislation was passed by the Parliament of Western Australia for the sale of AlintaGas, which listed on the Australian Securities Exchange (ASX) on 17 October 2000. On 8 May 2003 AlintaGas Limited changed its name to Alinta Limited.

On 23 July 2003 through a series of complicated transactions involving Alinta, Aquila Energy, United Energy and AMP Henderson Global, Alinta became the operator, manager and part owner of regulated energy assets in Western Australia and Victoria. In April 2004 Alinta acquired Duke Energy's assets in Australia and New Zealand. In October 2004 a consortium of Alcoa, Alinta and DUET acquired the Dampier to Bunbury Natural Gas Pipeline from Epic Energy.

On 4 October 2005 Alinta publicly floated the pipelines and power stations it acquired from Duke Energy International into a separate investment vehicle, Alinta Infrastructure Holdings (AIH) which also traded on the ASX. In October 2006 Alinta, through Alinta IH Pty Ltd (Alinta IHPL), made an offer to buy out the 80% of the shareholding in AIH that it did not already own. By 11 January 2007 Alinta had acquired 91.4%, and moved to compulsorily acquire the remainder.

Alinta acquired infrastructure assets and the Agility business from AGL through a combination of merger and demerger transactions on 25 October 2006.

On 9 January 2007 Alinta announced that senior executives and the Chairman were working on a management buyout proposal, with Macquarie Bank as their advisor. As a result, the chief executive officer Bob Browning resigned on 11 January 2007, and the company was clearly for sale to the highest bidder.

Alinta was acquired on 31 August 2007 by a consortium comprising Singapore Power International, the largest utility company in Singapore, and Australia's second-largest investment bank, Babcock & Brown Infrastructure and Babcock & Brown Power with a bid of A$13.9 billion, beating out a rival bid by Macquarie Bank. Alinta was delisted from the Australian Securities Exchange in September 2007.

Alinta was split into the following businesses:

- Alinta, retaining the Western Australian gas retail business. Alinta Limited for a time was known as Westnet Infrastructure Group Limited. In 2017, This business now trading as Alinta Energy was acquired by Hong Kong–based Chow Tai Fook Enterprises.
- WestNet Energy, which provides asset management, operational, construction and maintenance services to the owners of the AlintaGas Networks gas distribution system in Western Australia; and to the owners of the Dampier to Bunbury Natural Gas Pipeline. It is also a major contractor in overhead and underground electricity cabling.
- Alinta LGA, renamed to Jemena on 4 August 2008, which manages energy infrastructure assets in the eastern states of Australia including Queensland and New South Wales, and gas pipelines and gas and electricity distribution networks in Victoria. Later, ownership of Jemena passed to Singapore Power International, and its name was changed to SPI (Australia) Assets Pty Ltd. In 2014, State Grid Corporation of China acquired a 60% stake in Jemena, and the company's name was changed to SGSP (Australia) Assets Pty Ltd (SGSPAA). The company continues to trade as Jemena.

Since the restructuring Alinta has continued to grow and diversify to become one of Australia's largest energy companies. Alinta has been a key investor in Australia's renewable energy projects and plans to build the world's largest offshore wind farm, a 50 MW solar thermal plant at Port Augusta in South Australia in 2013.
