= The Cocoa Trees =

Confectionery retail chain

Logo of The Cocoa Trees

The Cocoa Trees is a retail chain store of chocolate and confectionery brands based in Asia. It is a brand of Focus Network Agencies (FNA) Singapore, a former subsidiary of ABR Holdings. The company is the largest distributor and retailer of chocolate and confectionery products in Asia, with more than 70 stores in the Asia-Pacific region. It also operates 12 chocolate and confectionery shops at Singapore Changi Airport. In 2014, FNA secured tenders to operate the departure lounges of Terminal 1 and 3. FNA also supplies and distributes chocolates to supermarkets in Singapore and overseas.

== History ==
FNA was founded in 1991 when the Duty Free Store Singapore (DFS) closed down their Chocolates Trading Division. Esther Loo, who was then the head of chocolate division at DFS, took over and started her own distribution company. The company started out with 5 staff and two agency lines: Hawaiian Host and Droste. In the same year, FNA posted a turnover of $1 million.

From 1991 to 1993, FNA acquired three more chocolate brands and opened of their first retail outlet, FNA Chocolate Boutique. Loo Lip Giam, current Group chief executive officer and husband of Esther Loo, joined the company in 1994. FNA Chocolate Boutique was renamed The Cocoa Trees in 2000.

In 2003, FNA received an investment sum of $5 million from ABR Holdings, which also owns the Swensen's ice cream franchise, and its partners. ABR Holdings sold their shares in 2012. In 2014, FNA received an undisclosed amount of investment from Heliconia Capital Management, an investment arm of Temasek Holdings. FNA plans to expand the chain abroad.

FNA's Regional Distribution (Travel Retail) Division has established a Pan-Asian distribution network. The Cocoa Trees has branches and outlets operating out of China, Hong Kong, India, Korea, the Maldives, Malaysia and Taiwan. The company also owns Cocoa and Co. and Choc Spot.

== Retail stores ==
Choc Spot and Cocoa & Co. are retail stores set up by The Cocoa Trees to target sub-urban malls in Singapore. Choc Spot stores are located at West Mall, Bedok Mall, Nex, Sembawang Shopping Centre, West Gate, Compass Point (Grand Final). Cocoa & Co operates five outlets in Singapore Changi Airport, selling candies and chocolates.

M&M's World Stores are also operated at Singapore Changi Airport terminals, supplying clothing and other goods branded with M&M's mascots and logos. In October 2011, FNA, Mars, Incorporated International Travel Retail (ITR) and Changi Airport Group (CAG) opened a 40-square metre M&M's store at Singapore Changi Airport's Terminal 1. In the following year, the group opened its flagship store at Changi Airport's Terminal 2 departure transit lounge.

== Subsidiaries ==
Hydro Style, founded in 2004 is Singapore's largest importer and distributor of designer European kitchen and bathroom supplies. Interiors Affairs, the retail arm of Hydro Style, was launched in 2010. Interiors Affairs sells the products carried by Hydro Style in its showroom.

Established in 2004, Global Vintage Network Pte. Ltd is a subsidiary company of FNA, and distributes wines in the region.

== Philanthropic work ==
The Cocoa Trees Endowed Bursary was established in 2014. The bursary aims to provide financial aid to undergraduates from the School of Economics at the Singapore Management University (SMU). Three bursaries are awarded per year.
