= Beautiful Trio =

Chinese language drama TV show

- Poster
- 大女人·小女人
- Genre: Modern Romance
- Starring: Huang Biren; Ivy Lee; Stella Huang; Zhang Yaodong
- Opening theme: "云霄飞车" by Stella Huang
- Country of origin: Singapore
- Original language: Chinese
- No. of episodes: 20

Production
- Running time: approx. 45 minutes

Original release
- Network: MediaCorp TV Channel 8
- Release: March 22 – April 16, 2004

Beautiful Trio (大女人·小女人) is a Chinese language drama broadcast on Singapore's largest television network, MediaCorp TV Channel 8. The show was filmed in 2003 but broadcast in 2004. It stars Huang Biren, Ivy Lee, Stella Huang & Zhang Yaodong as the casts of the series.

This series was re-telecasted on MediaCorp TV Channel 8 on every Saturday, 11am to 1pm and has since ended its re-run on 31 January 2009.

== Synopsis ==
The drama concerns three women with different ways of dealing with a relationship and their views of men.

Huang Biren plays Christina, a 40-year-old woman with a 14-year-old daughter whose husband (played by Li Wen Hai) is a houseman.

Ivy Lee plays Leo Leo, a 33-year-old woman who thinks men are only interested in sex.

Stella Ng plays Samantha, a 24-year-old woman who thinks men cannot protect her. Because of the same thinking of detesting men in the three women, they become good friends. Zzen Chang acts as Stella Ng's good buddy in the show, the only man she trusts.

== Cast ==
=== Main cast ===
- Huang Biren as Christina
- Ivy Lee as Leo Leo
- Stella Huang as Samantha

=== Supporting cast ===
- Zhang Yaodong
- Zen Chong
- Li Wenhai
- Benjamin Yeung Sheung Bun (Hong Kong singer)
