= On Cheong Jewellery =

Jewellery company in Singapore

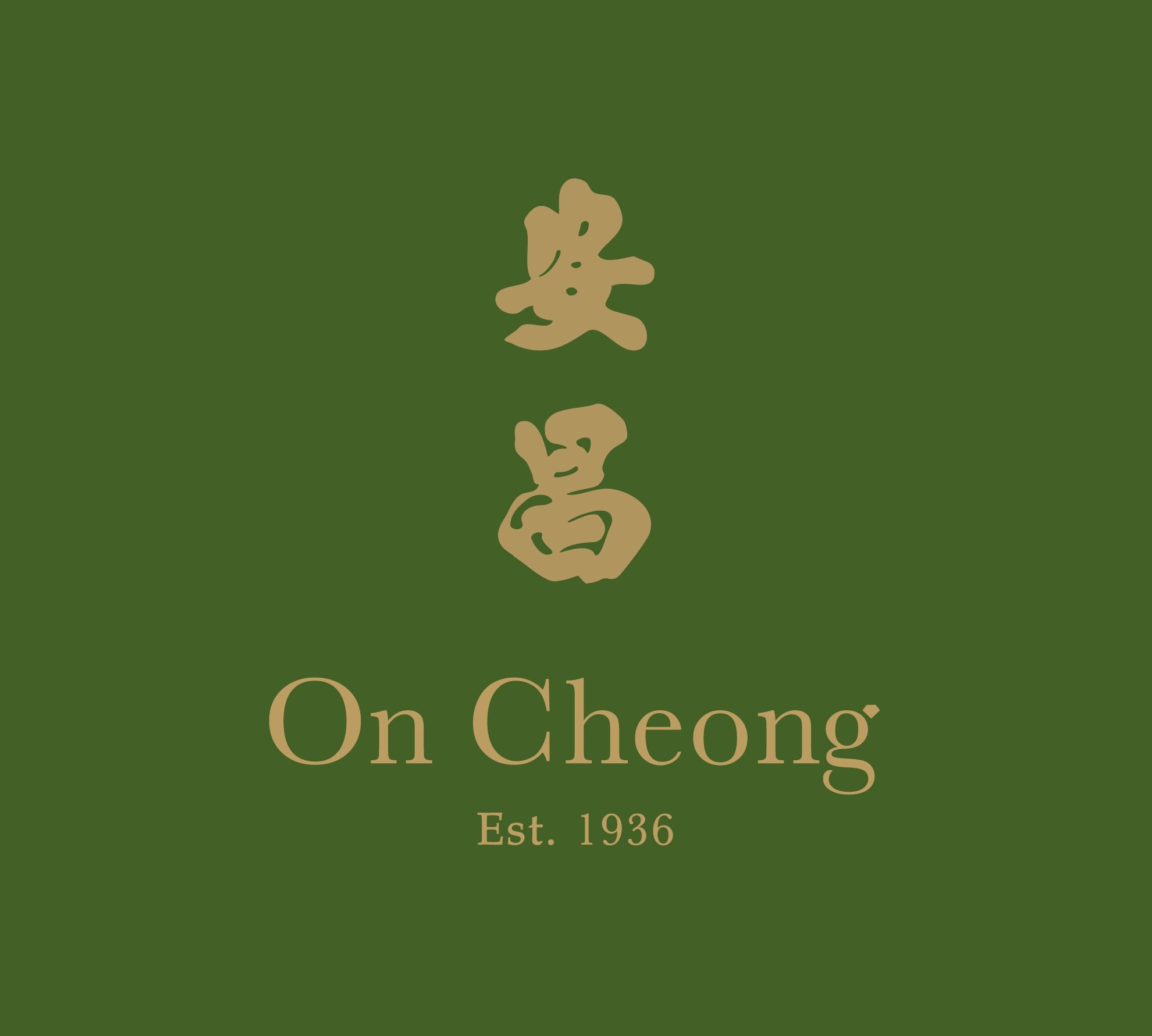
- Industry: Retailing; Jewellery Manufacturing
- Founded: Singapore (1936; 90 years ago)
- Founder: Ho Yew Ping (1911 - 1965）
- Headquarters: Chinatown, Singapore
- Area served: Singapore
- Key people: Ho Nai Chuen, MD
- Number of employees: 1300
- Website: www.oncheong.com

On Cheong Jewellery (安昌) is a jewellery manufacturing company based in Singapore. On Cheong Jewellery is a member of the Singapore Jewellers Association (SJA), a non-profit representing jewellery operators in Singapore.

== History ==
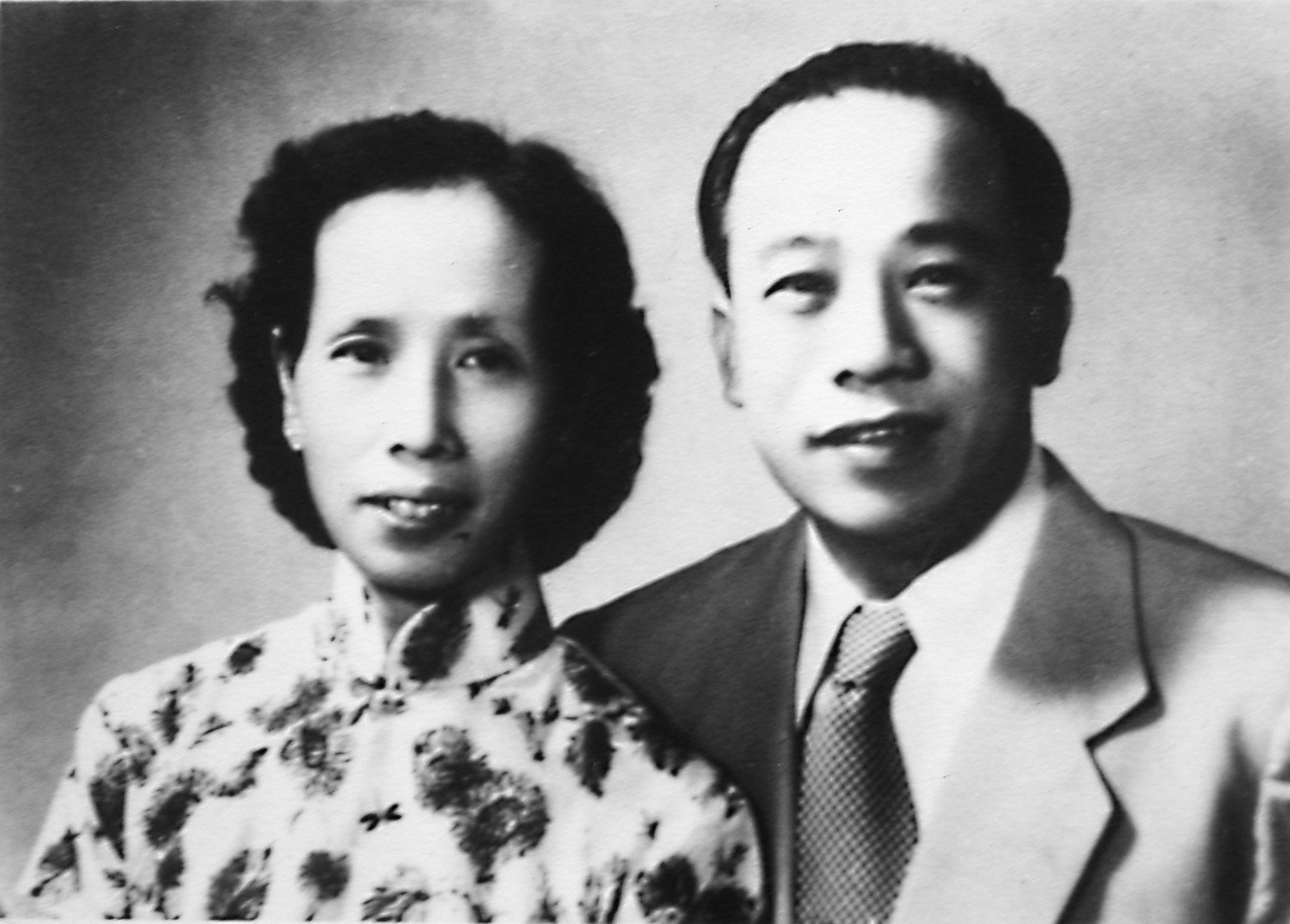
Founder of On Cheong Co. Pte Ltd

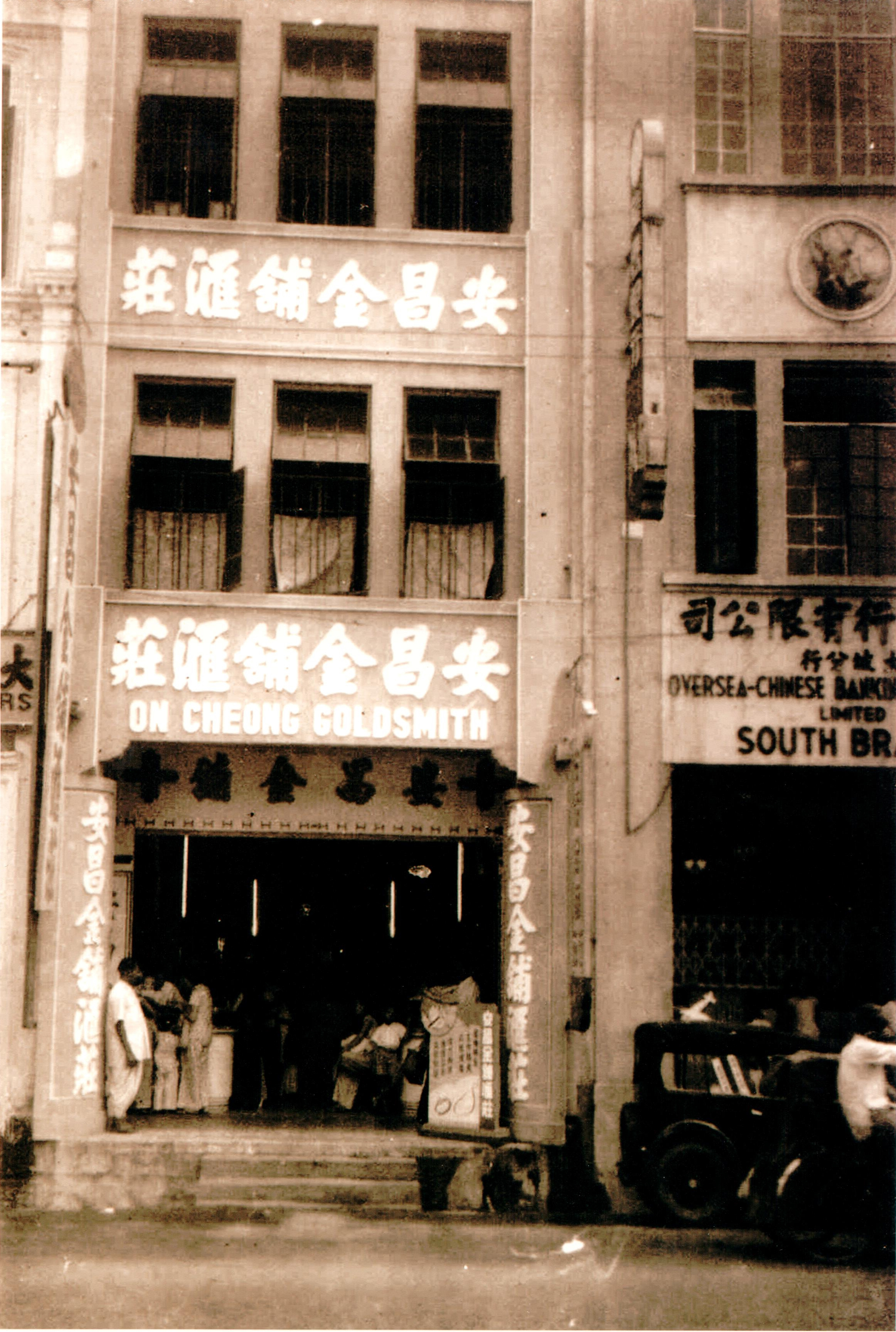
On Cheong Jewellery in the 1950s Singapore Chinatown

On Cheong Jewellery was founded in 1936 by Ho Yew Ping, an emigrant of Guangdong Shunde province of China. The name of the company is derived from the phrase "平安昌盛", meaning peace and prosperity. On Cheong moved to its current location, a shophouse on South Bridge Road, in 1941. In the 1940s On Cheong acquired Kwong Yik and Nan Jing Goldsmiths as part of an expansion and was formally incorporated in 1949. Ho Yew Ping’s wife and the eldest son took over the operations of the business after Ping's death in 1965.

Ho Nai Chuen, the youngest of Ho's children, joined the family business in 1985 and is currently the Managing Director of On Cheong.

During the 2008 financial crisis, sales of gold jewellery fell. In response On Cheong shifted from mass-produced jewellery to customized pieces. The firm also placed additional emphasis on jade jewellery.

== Products ==
On Cheong offers a variety of products including gold, diamonds, jadeite and gem-set jewellery.

== Awards ==
On Cheong has been noted for its practice in retaining older staff. The company was one of the five employers listed by the Tripartite Alliance for Fair Practices in 2012.

== Locations ==
On Cheong’s flagship store is located at South Bridge Road while its branch is located at New Bridge Road.
