= GlobalRoam =

Singaporean technology company

GlobalRoam Pte Ltd
- Industry: Telecommunications
- Founded: 2001; 25 years ago
- Founder: Clarence Tan
- Headquarters: Singapore
- Products: Toku; Pfingo
- Parent: GlobalRoam Group Ltd

GlobalRoam Group Ltd was a Singaporean technology company specializing in infocomm services. It was founded in 2001 and sold early 2018 to a financial firm for an undisclosed amount.

GlobalRoam developed smartmapping, which allows the sharing of a small pool of DDI numbers to reach to a large number of users. This is done for end-users without any additional software downloads or equipment.

Pfingo (Phone, Finger, Internet on the Go), one of GlobalRoam's products, was a global communication platform for the underbanked market segment. It had its own international calling card and mobile application. Pfingo was discontinued in June 2018. Another product, Toku, is a communication app that enables users to link multiple phone numbers to a single global identity.
