= Babcock & Brown =

Global investment firm, 1977 to 2009

Babcock & Brown LP
- Type: Public
- Traded as: ASX: BNB
- Industry: Corporate finance; Project finance; Operating leasing; Private equity; Real estate; Structured finance
- Founded: 1977; 49 years ago
- Defunct: 24 August 2009
- Fate: Liquidation
- Headquarters: Sydney, Australia (formerly San Francisco)
- Key people: Michael Larkin (CEO); Elizabeth Nosworthy; (chairman); Jim Babcock (co-founder); Jim Fantaci; Paul Marini; Michael Dickey Morgan; Bob Falkenberg
- Products: Financial services; Funds management; Structured finance
- Revenue: A$1.29 billion (2006)
- Number of employees: 1,000
- Website: n/a

Babcock & Brown LP (B&B) was a global investment and advisory firm, established in 1977, based in Sydney, Australia, that went into liquidation in 2009.

Babcock & Brown Securities LLC is an active investment banking firm focused on equipment and project financing such as aircraft, rail, marine and infrastructure and is based in Greenwich, CT, USA. It is unrelated to Babcock & Brown LP.

Babcock & Brown LP was best known in financial markets for structured finance deals. The company had at its peak 28 offices and over 1,500 employees worldwide. Although headquartered in Sydney, it had a significant presence in Europe and the United States. The creditors of Babcock & Brown LP voted to place the company into liquidation on 24 August 2009.

At the end of 2008 Babcock & Brown LP had a market capitalisation of just over $8.5 billion, and in 2007 its market capitalisation peaked at above $9.1 billion (A$33.90 per share). However, by October 2008 the share price had collapsed by 95% to A$1.30 and by December 2008 by 99.6% to A$0.14, representing a market capitalisation of less than $50 million. On 13 March 2009 the company was placed into voluntary administration. Approximately 45% of its shares were owned by the executives of the firm.

Nicknamed the "Mini Macquarie", Babcock & Brown LP was a company frequently compared with larger competitor Macquarie Bank.

== History ==
Babcock & Brown LP was founded in 1977 by James Babcock and George Brown in San Francisco, US. It largely operated as a corporate advisory firm focused on leasing of aircraft and other equipment until the early 1990s. Babcock & Brown LP opened a Sydney office in 1982 and entered the real estate market there, at that time enjoying considerable success. Jim Babcock resigned from the board of directors on 1 November 2008 citing personal reasons.

The company's focus from advisory work to investment management continued until a German bank Bayerische Hypo- und Vereinsbank invested US$120 million in return for a 20% stake. It used those funds and third-party funds they raised from clients to invest directly in a wide variety of investments, as both co-investor and principal.

== Organisational structure ==
Babcock & Brown LP regarded its three business functions as financial advisory, principal investment on its own account, and funds management. It was a global business with 33% of its revenues coming from the United States, 31% from Australia, and 36% from Europe. In 2005 its real estate group generated 36% of the company's net revenue. This division made investments on behalf of the company itself, and also of property-focused managed funds that it had organised. It had considerable success in property investments in Japan and Germany.

In infrastructure and project finance, an area in which Macquarie Bank is probably best known in Australia, Babcock & Brown LP emerged as a significant investor in a range of power, transport, water and public-private partnerships (PPPs). Starting out in England with PPP projects, this part of Babcock & Brown LP's business generated 24% of the company's net revenue. In 2004 it established Prime Infrastructure, an ASX listed infrastructure fund containing coal distribution and related assets.

It also had an operating leasing business (Babcock & Brown Aircraft Management), listed in NY under the ticker symbol FLY, which generated 24% of net revenue and managed around 300 leased commercial jets for airline clients, in a portfolio worth approximately US$8.1 billion on 1 June 2008, one of the largest portfolios of commercial jets in the world. As of March 2009 FLY did not appear to have been materially affected by the problems at B&B. Babcock and Brown Air changed its name to FLY Leasing in February 2010. The senior management of FLY Leasing's manager (Babcock and Brown Aircraft Management) completed a MBO of Babcock and Brown's aircraft leasing business in April 2010. The company was renamed BBAM LLC. In 2017, BBAM was the seventh largest aircraft leasing company in the world, managing a fleet of 390 aircraft.

Babcock & Brown LP's "bread and butter" business was its role as a financial adviser in structured finance, including leases, debt placement for large leases, hedging, and securitisation. It focused on businesses looking to lease equipment essential to their business in the most tax-effective and low cost way possible. Babcock & Brown LP was one of the world's leading financial advisers. It was considered the market leader in the United States and the United Kingdom in this area. The structured finance advisory business generated 23% of the company's net revenue.

The company had a highly successful listing on the Australian Stock Exchange in 2004 where it raised over $550 million in new capital.

By 2009, though, the company became a high-profile victim of the credit crunch.

Nevertheless, some aspects of Babcock & Brown LP's business, particularly the infrastructure related activities were well-founded and have re-emerged from the collapse. These include Babcock & Brown LP's successful wind energy business, now called Infigen Energy and listed on the ASX; Prime Infrastructure, which was acquired by Brookfield; and Babcock & Brown LP's well regarded public-private partnership business, which was acquired from Babcock & Brown LP and trades as Amber Infrastructure, headquartered in London.

== Acquisitions ==
In 1997, Babcock & Brown acquired the investment banking, advisory, equity and structured finance assets of AIDC Ltd from the Australian government.

In August 2006 managed fund, Babcock & Brown Capital, announced that it had completed a 65% acquisition of Irish telecommunications company Eircom, with its partner the Eircom Employee Share Ownership Trust Limited (ESOT) holding the remaining 35% of Eircom Group.

In March 2007 Babcock & Brown LP led a consortium to attempt to buy the Australian energy company Alinta Ltd. The takeover by a scheme of arrangement was supported by the Alinta Board.

In the Irish Independent newspaper it was reported that Babcock & Brown LP were planning to break up Eircom. Retaining the core backbone Network Wholesale Division and selling the Eircom Retail and Mobile (Meteor) Divisions. It was reported that the retail arm of Eircom could be worth €1bn and Meteor around €800m.

== Debt problems ==
Babcock & Brown LP's shares fell 27% on 12 June 2008 due to fears about the debt levels of it and its various satellite funds. The plunge triggered a debt covenant when its market capitalisation fell below A$2.5 billion (roughly equivalent to a share price of $7.50). Some of the satellite funds, which have suffered similar falls in share price, responded by cutting their dividends and selling assets in order to repay debt.

On 19 August 2008, the Babcock & Brown LP's stock price was down 23.5% due to speculation about being forced to sell assets to cover bad debts, which caused the company to place itself into a trading halt and receive a price query from the Australian Stock Exchange. The company then announced board and management changes, including the stepping down of CEO Phil Green and the announcement of no dividends. On 21 August 2008, its share price collapsed a further 36% to end at $2.22, a record low.

In September Babcock & Brown LP commenced selling some of its non-core businesses and assets and reducing its workforce in order to streamline its operations. On 4 December it was announced that Babcock & Brown LP had been granted a $150 million loan from its 25 bankers and had the covenants on its outstanding debt removed, conditional on production of a satisfactory revised business plan. Pending resolution, a trading halt was put in place on 8 January. A statement on 23 January 2009 announced "the Board believes that in the current market environment and based on continuing discussions with the banking syndicate there will be no value for equity holders under the revised business plan and balance sheet restructure of Babcock & Brown International Pty Ltd (the parent company) and negligible or no value for holders of the Company's subordinated notes." The banking syndicate is dominated by Australian and European institutions, with Australia's four major banks holding aggregate exposure estimated at $800 million.

The company went into voluntary administration in March 2009 after unsecured bondholders voted against a debt restructuring plan that would value their claims at 0.1 cents in the dollar. The rejection rendered the Babcock & Brown LP insolvent because it could not meet interest payments.
