= U2opia Mobile =

- Company type: Private
- Founded: 2010; 16 years ago in Singapore,
- No. of locations: Dubai, Gurgaon, San Francisco, Manila and Singapore(HQ)
- Area served: Worldwide
- Founders: Sumesh Menon; Ankit Nautiyal
- Products: Fonetwish
- Employees: 150 (2015)
- Website: www.u2opiamobile.com

U2opia Mobile is a Singaporean mobile technology company. The company’s main product Fonetwish enables customers to receive real time updates from social networking sites such as Facebook, Twitter and Google on any handset without access to the internet. It also develops several social applications.

== History ==
U2opia Mobile was founded by Sumesh Menon and Ankit Nautiyal in 2010.

By 2014, the company had a customer base of 15 million in over 33 countries.

In October 2017, U2opia Mobile launched Reycreo, a platform geared to help game discovery and adoption in frontier markets.

== Products and services ==
Fonetwish, the company’s main product, is a mobile application platform that works on the USSD protocol. It enables customers to access their Facebook or Twitter accounts from any location without having a 3G, EDGE or any other internet connection. Users can access their accounts by navigating through a textual, session-based interface. The service is popular in several countries in Asia and Africa. The service is also available in Central and South American countries like Haiti, El Salvador and Bolivia. The versions of Facebook and Twitter are text only and do not have any photos or videos. The company also develops several social applications.

== Operations ==
U2opia Mobile has offices in Dubai, Gurgaon, and San Francisco along with their headquarters in Singapore. It has over 150 employees and was backed by the private equity investment firm Matrix Partners in 2011. It has partnered with telecom companies such as Bharti Airtel, Facebook and Twitter.
