= Senoko Energy =

Company

- Company type: Private
- Industry: Electric utility
- Founded: 1977; 49 years ago
- Headquarters: Singapore
- Key people: Graeme York (President and CEO)
- Parent: Lion Power
- Website: www.senokoenergy.com

Senoko Energy is one of Singapore's largest power generation companies in Singapore, accounting for approximately 20% of the nation's electricity supply.

== History ==
Senoko Power was originally formed in 1977 as a power generation arm of the Public Utilities Board (PUB) in Singapore. In the 1990s, it converted the Power Station from an open-cycle gas turbine power plant to Singapore's first combined cycle plant. It also began piping in natural gas from Malaysia to generate electricity in 1992.

In October 1995, the electricity and gas departments of the PUB corporatised their holdings and vested the electricity and gas undertakings under the Singapore government's investment arm, Temasek Holdings. Within Temasek Holdings, the newly formed Singapore Power was structured as a holding company for five separate subsidiaries, including PowerSenoko Limited (the original corporate name for the company that would become Senoko Energy).

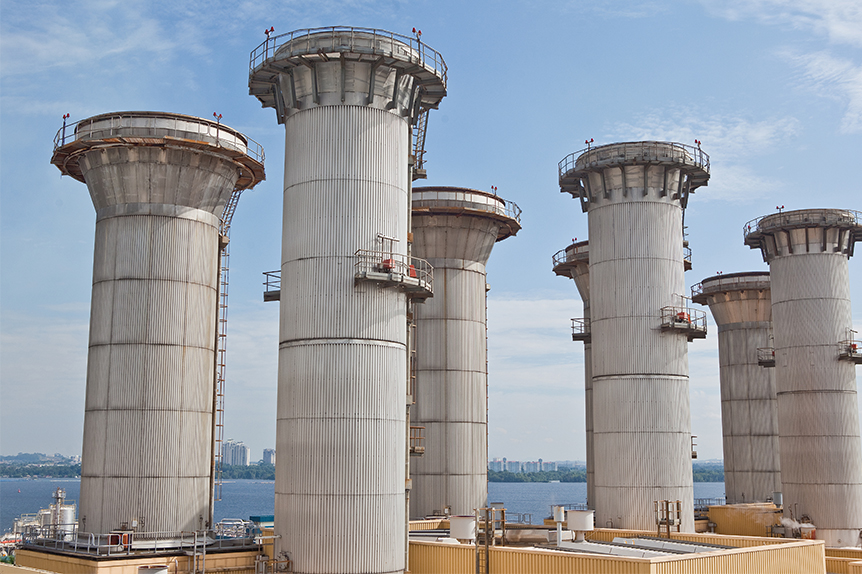
Senoko Power Station located on the northern coast of Singapore

In April 2001, Singapore Power's power generation subsidiaries (including PowerSenoko) were fully divested to Temasek. That same month, a new statutory body, the Energy Market Authority (EMA), was established. PowerSenoko was renamed Senoko Power Limited and it was among the first three companies to receive a power trading licence from the EMA. In April 2004, the company began a $50-million (SGD) power plant upgrade, which eventually made it the largest electricity producer in Singapore.

In September 2008, a consortium led by Japanese trading company, Marubeni, acquired Senoko Power from Temasek Holdings for $3.65 billion (SGD). Other members of the consortium included Kyushu Electric Power, Kansai Electric, the Japan Bank of International Cooperation, and GDF Suez (now Engie) of France. The consortium is known as Lion Power Holdings with Marubeni and Engie holding the most shares at 30% each. Also in 2008, the company started converting three of its oil-fired turbines (producing 750 MW of power) into two natural gas-fired turbines (producing 862 MW of power). The $1-billion (SGD) repowering project was completed in 2013 and resulted in a 1-million ton reduction in carbon dioxide emissions annually.

In 2010, the company underwent restructuring and became known by its current name, Senoko Energy Private Limited. In November 2016, the company became one of the founding members of the Singapore chapter of the World Energy Council.

In April 2018, Senoko Energy began offering consumers individual energy plans for households and small and medium-sized enterprises as part of the EMA's soft launch of the Open Electricity Market in Singapore. It was one of 13 approved electricity retailers when the Open Electricity Market opened nationwide in May 2019. It was one of six that also generated its own power.

In November 2024, Sembcorp Industries, through its subsidiary Sembcorp Utilities, acquired Engie’s 30% stake in Senoko Energy, increasing its shareholding in the company.

In June 2025, Sembcorp Utilities and Marubeni Corporation increased their interest in Senoko Energy to 50% each by acquiring the shares of KPIC Netherlands, Kyuden International, and the Japan Bank of International Cooperation. This established a 50/50 joint ownership structure between Sembcorp and Marubeni. Marubeni stated it intended to strengthen Senoko’s profitability, competitiveness, and corporate value in partnership with Sembcorp, while ensuring a stable electricity supply for Singapore.

== Subsidiaries ==
Senoko Energy has three subsidiaries: Senoko Energy Supply, Senoko Services, and Senoko Gas Supply. Senoko Energy Supply is the company's retail arm that sells electricity and other services to consumers in Singapore. Senoko Services leases out fuel storage tanks and provides terminal services. Senoko Gas Supply is a licensed gas shipper and retailer that is authorised by the EMA to ship gas throughout the country's gas network.
