= Japfa =

Agriculture and food corporation

Japfa Ltd
- Type: Public
- Traded as: SGX: UD2; IDX: JPFA
- Founded: 1971
- Headquarters: Singapore
- Area served: Indonesia; Vietnam; Myanmar; Bangladesh; India
- Products: Poultry; Processed meat Animal feed Dairy products
- Revenue: USD 4.4 billion (2023)
- Net income: USD 118.8 million (2023)
- Number of employees: ~37,000
- Website: japfa.com

Japfa Ltd is a multinational agriculture and food corporation headquartered in Singapore with its origins and primary operations in Indonesia (as PT Japfa Comfeed Indonesia Tbk), along with subsidiaries which operate in the rest of Asia. The company was founded in 1971, and listed at the Jakarta Stock Exchange and the Singapore Stock Exchange in 1989 and 2014 respectively. Its business include animal feed alongside fish and poultry products.

== History ==
The company's operations in Indonesia originated in 1959, when Ferry Teguh Santosa founded PT Ometraco as a diversified group. Japfa was founded in 1971 at Surabaya, as a joint venture between Ometraco and German firm Internationale Graanhandel Thegrau to manufacture copra pellets and coconut oil. Its name was initially PT Java Pelletizing Factory. In 1982, Ometraco took over Thegrau's stake. Ferry's son, Handojo Santosa, joined Japfa in 1986 and later took over management of the company. Japfa entered the aquaculture industry in 1987.

It had its initial public offering at the Jakarta and Surabaya Stock Exchanges in 1989. In 1990, the company took over assets from a number of other food manufacturers under Ometra, and renamed itself to PT Japfa Comfeed Indonesia. Ometra went bankrupt due to the Asian financial crisis in 1997, but Japfa remained operational. The company listed itself at the Singapore Stock Exchange on 15 August 2014.

== Corporate affairs ==
In 2021, Japfa sold an 80% stake in its branded dairy subsidiary Greenfields to private equity groups TPG and Northstar Group for US$236 million. In 2022, the group listed its China-based dairy subsidiary AustAsia at the Hong Kong Stock Exchange, distributing the subsidiaries' shares to shareholders. As of 2022, it is the second largest poultry and animal feed producer in Indonesia, behind Charoen Pokphand. In 2018, the company was fined Rp 2 billion (US$140,000) by the Indonesian Business Competition Supervisory Commission for failing to provide a notice to the body following its acquisition of a smaller firm.

The company's Indonesian subsidiary made up approximately 75% of its total revenue in 2023, with other subsidiaries primarily operating in Vietnam, Myanmar, India, and Bangladesh.

== Products ==
The company produces animal and aquaculture feed, whole poultry carcasses, beef, processed poultry products, and processed seafood.
