= Golden Agri-Resources =

Singaporean palm oil company

Golden-Agri Resources
- Type: Public
- Traded as: SGX: E5H
- Founded: 1987; 39 years ago
- Headquarters: Singapore
- Key people: Franky Widjaja (Director and president)
- Number of employees: 170,700 (2017)

Golden-Agri Resources (GAR) is a Singaporean palm oil company, listed on the Singapore Stock Exchange since 1999. In May 2015, its market capitalization was $4.1 billion. Franky Widjaja, of the Sinar Mas family is its CEO. Alnoor is a subsidiary of GAR. Lew Syn Pau used to serve as a member of the Singaporean Parliament for 13 years and is a member of the board of directors of the firm.

== Criticism of environmental record ==
According to Greenpeace, GAR has six concessions on peatlands in Riau, with an estimated total area of 20,000 hectares. GAR was reported to have 1,880 hectares of peat in Central Kalimantan and 1,330 hectares in West Kalimantan, while claiming a zero-deforestation footprint. Greenpeace also discovered 322 hotspots on five to GAR's concessions in Central Kalimantan. GAR denied these accusations and said to have a zero-burning policy since 1997. Interviews with senior officers revealed evidence to the contrary. In about 2010, companies such as Burger King, Unilever and Nestlé cancelled their supplier contracts with Singapore-listed GAR subsidiaries due to unsustainable farming practices. Golden owns a subsidiary in Liberia called Golden Veroleum, which in 2018 was removed from the Roundtable on Sustainable Palm Oil for alleged land acquisition violations.
