= Awfully Chocolate =

Bakery chain in Asia

- Type: Private limited company
- Industry: Cafe
- Founded: 16 November 1998; 27 years ago in Katong, Singapore
- Founders: Lyn Lee; John Yap
- Headquarters: 190A Pandan Loop, Singapore
- Areas served: Singapore; China
- Key people: Lyn Lee (director)
- Products: Chocolate cake; Chocolate
- Website: www.awfullychocolate.com

Awfully Chocolate is a bakery chain in Asia. It is known for its all-chocolate cake and other desserts. It has 17 locations including shops, cafes and restaurants.

== History ==
Awfully Chocolate was founded by Lyn Lee and John Yap. Lee left her job as an attorney to start the business in 1998. Its first store was in Katong in Singapore. Only one type of cake was sold: a round six-inch chocolate fudge cake called the "all-chocolate cake". The store had an unusual minimalist design in dark brown and white, with the cakes not on display. It received early attention for not looking like a typical cake store and for its similarly minimalist-looking single product.

Its second store, at Cluny Court, was opened in 2004.

By 2007 there were 17 franchise locations in China, Taiwan and Hong Kong.

It later opened a cafe called Ninethirty.

== Products ==
=== Cakes ===
The all-chocolate cake was Awfully Chocolate's first product. It was sold in whole 6-inch cakes. Half a year later, the chocolate banana cake was introduced, followed by the chocolate, rum and cherry cake for Christmas in December 1999.

=== Ice Cream ===
In 2005, Hei Ice Cream was released, the company's signature dark chocolate ice cream. They were served in containers that resemble American Chinese take-out food boxes, with the Chinese character "hei" that means "dark".

=== Seasonal products ===
Every Christmas, Awfully Chocolate sells log cakes based on its original all-chocolate cake.
