= Northstar Group =

Singaporean private equity fund management firm

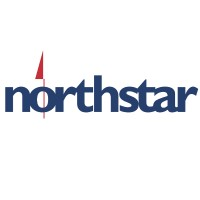
- Type: Private
- Industry: Investments; technology; retail
- Founded: 2003
- Headquarters: Singapore
- Website: nsgroup.com

Northstar Group is a Singapore-based private equity fund management firm dedicated to investments in growth companies in Indonesia and other countries in Southeast Asia. The firm is partly owned by the U.S.-based TPG Capital.

Northstar's investments include Gojek and Indomaret.
