= 1969 Birthday Honours =

British government recognitions

The 1969 Queen's Birthday Honours were appointments to orders and decorations of the Commonwealth realms to reward and highlight citizens' good works, on the occasion of the official birthday of Queen Elizabeth II. They were announced in supplements to the London Gazette of 6 June 1969.

At this time honours for Australians were awarded both in the United Kingdom honours on the advice of the premiers of Australian states, and also in a separate Australian honours list.

The recipients of honours are displayed here as they were styled before their new honour, and arranged by honour, with classes (Knight, Knight Grand Cross, etc.) and then divisions (Military, Civil, etc.) as appropriate.

== United Kingdom and Commonwealth ==
=== Baron ===
Life Peer

- Sidney Lewis Bernstein, Chairman, Granada Group Ltd.
- Sir Paul Henry Gore-Booth, GCMG, KCVO, lately Head of HM Diplomatic Service.
- Sir Kenneth Mackenzie Clark, CH, KCB. For services to the Arts.
- Sir Robert Lowe Hall, KCMG, CB, formerly Principal, Hertford College, University of Oxford. Economic Adviser to HM Government, November 1953–May 1961. Advisory Director to Unilever and Adviser to Tube Investments.

=== Privy Counsellor ===
- James Hutchison Hoy, DL, MP. Member of Parliament for Leith 1945–1950 and for the Leith Division of Edinburgh since 1950. Joint Parliamentary Secretary, Ministry of Agriculture, Fisheries and Food since October 1964.
- Sydney Irving, MP. Member of Parliament for the Dartford Division of Kent since 1955. Treasurer of HM Household, October 1964–March 1966. Deputy Chairman of Ways and Means, April 1966–October 1968. Chairman of Ways and Means since October 1968.
- Harold Lever, MP. Member of Parliament for the Exchange Division of Manchester 1945–1950, and for the Cheetham Division of Manchester since 1950. Joint Parliamentary Under-Secretary of State, Department of Economic Affairs, January 1967–August 1967. Financial Secretary, HM Treasury since August 1967.

=== Knight Bachelor ===
- John Betjeman, CBE, Poet and Author.
- Alfred Davies Devonsher Broughton, MRCS, LRCP, MP. Member of the Speaker's Panel of Chairmen. For services to Parliament.
- Raymond Frederick Brown, OBE. For services to the Ministry of Defence and to Export.
- Arthur Desmond Bonham-Carter, TD. For services to the National Health Service.
- Ernst Boris Chain, Professor of Biochemistry, University of London.
- Oliver Sidney Chesterton, MC. Lately President, Royal Institution of Chartered Surveyors.
- Leonard Crossland. Chairman, Ford Motor Company Ltd. For services to Export.
- Roger Salis Falk, OBE. For services to industrial management.
- Wing Commander Robert Grant Grant-Ferris, MP. Member of the Speaker's Panel of Chairmen. For services to Parliament.
- Professor Brian Hilton Flowers, Chairman, Science Research Council.
- Professor Robert Grieve. Chairman, Highlands and Islands Development Board.
- Richard Arthur Hayward, CBE. Chairman, Supplementary Benefits Commission.
- John MacGregor Hill, Chairman, United Kingdom Atomic Energy Authority.
- Maurice Andrew Holmes, Chairman, London Transport Board.
- Alec Arnold Constantine Issigonis, CBE, Technical Director, British Leyland Motor Corporation Limited.
- Charles Robert Keene, CBE, JP, Alderman, Leicester County Borough.
- Kenneth Alexander Keith. For services to economic and regional affairs.
- Robert Frith Lusty, Managing Director, Hutchinson Publishing Group Ltd.
- Robin McAlpine, CBE. For services to Civil Engineering.
- Hector McNeil, CBE, Chairman, Export Council for Europe. For services to Export.
- Bernard Miles, CBE, Founder and Artistic Director, Mermaid Theatre.
- John Francis Compton Miller, MBE, TD, Senior Registrar, Probate, Divorce and Admiralty Division.
- Peter Mursell, MBE, DL. For services to Local Government.
- Frederick Johnson Pedler, Chairman, Council for Technical Education and Training for Overseas Countries.
- Professor Nikolaus Bernhard Leon Pevsner, CBE. For services to the history of Art.
- Alan James Richmond, Principal, Lanchester College of Technology, Coventry.
- Gerard Ryder, CB, Solicitor, Board of Trade.
- Julian Salmon, CBE. For services to the catering industry.
- Henry Edmund Sargant, President, The Law Society.
- David Waldron Smithers, MD, FRCP, Professor of Radiotherapy, University of London.
- James Sharp Tait, Vice-Chancellor and Principal, The City University.
- Arthur George Weidenfeld, Chairman, Weidenfeld & Nicolson Ltd.
- Robert Francis Martin Wilkinson, Chairman, The Stock Exchange.
- John Spencer Wills. For services to Industry and the Arts.

Diplomatic Service and Overseas List

- Bruce Greatbatch, CMG, CVO, MBE, Governor and Commander-in-Chief, Seychelles.
- Clifford James Hammett, Chief Justice, Fiji.
- Philip Ernest Housden Pike, QC, lately Chief Justice, Borneo, Malaysia.

State of New South Wales

- Brian Hurtle Crowley, MM. For services to sport.
- Harold Grant Ferrier, CMG. For services to industry.
- Harold Stanley Wyndham, CBE. For services to education.

State of Victoria

- Albert Victor Jennings, of Mount Eliza. For services to the community.

State of Queensland

- Clarence Askew Byrne, OBE, DSC, of Caloundra. For services to the development of natural resources, particularly to mining.

State of South Australia

- Louis King, CMG, CVO, lately Under Secretary, Secretary to Minister of Health, and Clerk of the Executive Council.

State of Western Australia

- Henry Frank Cooke. For services to the pastoral industry and to the community.

State of Tasmania

- The Honourable Malcolm Peter Crisp, Senior Puisne Judge, Supreme Court of Tasmania.

=== Order of the Bath ===
==== Knight Grand Cross of the Order of the Bath (GCB) ====
Military Division

- General Sir Charles Harington, KCB, CBE, DSO, MC, (44880), late Infantry, Colonel Commandant The Prince of Wales's Division, Colonel Commandant Small Arms School Corps.

Civil Division

- Sir Ludovic James Dunnett, KCB, CMG, Permanent Under-Secretary of State, Ministry of Defence.

==== Knight Commander of the Order of the Bath (KCB) ====
Military Division

Royal Navy

- Vice-Admiral Ian Lachlan Mackay McGeoch, CB, DSO, DSC.
- Vice-Admiral William Donough O'Brien, CB, DSC.
- Vice-Admiral Michael Patrick Pollock, CB, MVO, DSC.

Army

- Lieutenant-General Cecil Hugh Blacker, CB, OBE, MC, (67083), late Royal Armoured Corps.
- Lieutenant-General John Noel Thomas, CB, DSO, MC, (65504), late Corps of Royal Engineers, Colonel Commandant Corps of Royal Engineers, Colonel Commandant Royal Pioneer Corps, Honorary Colonel Liverpool University O.T.C.

Royal Air Force

- Air Marshal Denis Graham Smallwood, CB, CBE, DSO, DFC.

Civil Division

- Cyril Maxwell Palmer Brown, CB, CMG, Second Permanent Secretary, Board of Trade.
- Samuel Goldman, CB, Second Secretary, HM Treasury.

==== Companion of the Order of the Bath (CB) ====
Military Division

Royal Navy

- Rear-Admiral David Arthur Dunbar-Nasmith, DSC.
- Rear-Admiral Frank Douglas Holford, DSC.
- Rear-Admiral Philip Holden Crothers Illingworth.
- Rear-Admiral Michael Donald Kyrle-Pope, MBE.
- Rear-Admiral William Bryan Scott Milln.
- Rear-Admiral Gambier John Byng Noel.
- Rear-Admiral John Charles Young Roxburgh, CBE, DSO, DSC.

Army

- Major-General Edwin Frederick Foxton, OBE, (72136), late Royal Army Educational Corps.
- Major-General Allan McGill, CBE, (384878), late Corps of Royal Electrical and Mechanical Engineers.
- Major-General Robert Bernard Penfold, MVO, (375887), late Royal Regiment of Artillery.
- Major-General Charles Herbert Stainforth, OBE, (378004), late Royal Army Service Corps.
- Major-General Gerald Abson Whiteley, OBE, (145325), Army Legal Services.
- Major-General Reginald Henry Whitworth, CBE, (124539), late Foot Guards.

Royal Air Force

- Air Vice-Marshal Thomas James Hanlon, CBE.
- Air Vice-Marshal Michael Henry Le Bas, CBE, DSO, AFC.
- Air Vice-Marshal John Hunter Hunter-Tod, OBE.
- Acting Air Vice-Marshal Stanley Haslam Bonser, MBE.
- Air Commodore Alastair Dyson Panton, OBE, DFC.

Civil Division

- John Meriton Benn, Permanent Secretary, Ministry of Education for Northern Ireland.
- John Francis Claxton, Deputy Director of Public Prosecutions.
- David Dickson, HM Senior Chief Inspector of Schools, Scottish Education Department.
- William Rowcliffe Elliott, Senior Chief Inspector, Department of Education and Science.
- Basil Gray, CBE, Keeper of Oriental Antiquities, British Museum.
- Philip Arthur Hufton, Deputy Director (Aircraft), Royal Aircraft Establishment, Farnborough, Ministry of Technology.
- Richard Brian Meredith King, MC, Deputy Secretary, Ministry of Overseas Development.
- Professor James Henry Herbert Merriman, OBE, Senior Director of Development, General Post Office.
- Norman Charles Price, Deputy Chairman, Board of Inland Revenue.
- Italo de Lisle Radice, Comptroller General, National Debt Office.
- Jack Leslie Rampton, Deputy Secretary, Ministry of Power.
- Charles Edgar Sherwin, lately Director of Warship Design, Ministry of Defence.
- Reginald Stanley Swift, Under Secretary, Department of Health and Social Security.
- Henry Moir Wilson, CMG, MBE, Chief Scientist (Army), Ministry of Defence.

=== Order of Saint Michael and Saint George ===
==== Knight Grand Cross of the Order of St Michael and St George (GCMG) ====
- The Right Honourable Samuel, Viscount Hood, KCMG, lately Foreign and Commonwealth Office.

==== Knight Commander of the Order of St Michael and St George (KCMG) ====
Diplomatic Service and Overseas List

- John Greville Stanley Beith, CMG, Her Majesty's Ambassador, Brussels.
- John Richard Cotton, CMG, OBE, lately Her Majesty's Ambassador, Kinshasa.
- Patrick Francis Hancock, CMG, lately Foreign and Commonwealth Office.
- Edward Emile Tomkins, CMG, CVO, Her Majesty's Minister, Washington.

==== Companion of the Order of St Michael and St George (CMG) ====
- Professor Charles Henry Dobinson. For services to education overseas.
- Arthur Stanley George Hoar, lately Managing Director, Commonwealth Development Finance Company Ltd.
- Arthur Patrick Hockaday, Assistant Under-Secretary of State, Ministry of Defence.
- Philip Bicknell Ray, Attached Ministry of Defence.

Diplomatic Service and Overseas List

- Thomas William Aston, Foreign and Commonwealth Office.
- Henry Arthur Hugh Cortazzi, Counsellor, Her Majesty's Embassy, Tokyo.
- John Burke da Silva, Counsellor, Her Majesty's Embassy, Washington.
- Edward Bruce Dawson-Moray, Foreign and Commonwealth Office.
- Robert James Dewar, CBE, Permanent Secretary, Ministry of Natural Resources, Malawi.
- Christopher Thomas Ewart Ewart-Biggs, OBE, Foreign and Commonwealth Office.
- David Ronald Holmes, CBE, MC, ED, Secretary for Chinese Affairs, Hong Kong.
- Oliver Kemp, OBE, lately Her Majesty's Ambassador, Ulan Bator.
- Edgar Ord Laird, MBE, lately Deputy High Commissioner, Kaduna, Nigeria.
- Daniel Donal John McCarthy, Foreign and Commonwealth Office.
- Brian Birley Roberts, Foreign and Commonwealth Office.
- John Armstrong Robinson, Foreign and Commonwealth Office.
- William Hart Sweeting, CBE, Chief Secretary, Bahama Islands.

State of New South Wales

- Emeritus Professor Bruce Toomba Mayes, MVO, MB, BS. For services to medicine.

State of Victoria

- Councillor Reginald Thomas Anthony Talbot, Lord Mayor of Melbourne. For services to the community.

State of Queensland

- Claude Bowhay. For services government and to sheep farming.

=== Royal Victorian Order ===
==== Dame Commander of the Royal Victorian Order (DCVO) ====
- Lady Jean Margaret Florence Rankin, CVO.

==== Knight Commander of the Royal Victorian Order (KCVO) ====
- Major Alastair Campbell Blair, CVO, TD.
- Rear-Admiral The Right Honourable David Charles, Earl Cairns, CB.

==== Commander of the Royal Victorian Order (CVO) ====
- George Brewster, MD, DPH.
- Frederick Peter Collison Garland, QPM.
- William Heseltine MVO.
- Doreen Archer Houblon, MVO.
- John Ritchie Inch, CBE.
- Jean Mary Monica Maxwell-Scott.
- Muriel Elsie Irene Waterman, MVO.
- Lieutenant-Commander Ernest Richard Wheeler, MVO, MBE, Royal Navy (Retd.).
- Hugh Walter Kingwell Wontner, MVO.

==== Member of the Royal Victorian Order (MVO) ====
At this time the two lowest classes of the Royal Victorian Order were "Member (fourth class)" and "Member (fifth class)", both with post-nominal letters MVO. "Member (fourth class)" was renamed "Lieutenant" (LVO) from the 1985 New Year Honours onwards.

Fourth Class

- Captain Alastair Sturgis Aird.
- Commander Peter Italo Frank Beeson, Royal Navy.
- Richard Philip Cave.
- Alfred Richard Deats.
- Charles Annand Fraser.
- Harry Anderson Clifford Gill.
- James Hamilton.
- Gwendolen Maud Kirby.
- Noel Melville Richards, OBE.
- Leslie George Vaughan, MVO.
- George Henry Wagstaff.
- Wing Commander Jack Leslie Wallace, OBE, Royal Air Force (Retd.).
- Edith Wheeler.

Fifth Class

- Anne Ainscough.
- Louis Peter Avery.
- Cecil Edward David Clinton.
- Stanley Horace Pearson.
- George Brooke-Pike.
- Felicity Margaret Salisbury Simpson.
- Albert Shirley Turner.
- Victor Ernest Walters.

==== Medal of the Royal Victorian Order (RVM) ====
In Silver

- Agnes Bier.
- Alexander Coull.
- Edward George Crabbe.
- Divisional Sergeant Major Bertram Charles Durbin, MC, Her Majesty's Bodyguard of the Yeomen of the Guard.
- William John Emmerson.
- Leonard Thomas Harrod.
- Francis Albert Holland.
- Chief Petty Officer Cook Alan Lancelot Jones, P/MX 725736.
- George Kendall.
- George Stanley Lines.
- Maurice Melton.
- William Arthur Raine.
- Thomas Harris Rees.
- James Harry Rivers.
- Leonard Francis Lee Vincett.
- Frederick Wilkins.

=== Order of the British Empire ===
==== Knight Grand Cross of the Order of the British Empire (GBE) ====
Civil Division

- Alderman Sir Louis Halle Gluckstein, CBE, TD, QC, DL, lately Chairman, Greater London Council.
- Sir Arthur Frank Kirby, KBE, CMG, Chairman, National Ports Council.
- Sir Arnold Charles Trinder, Lord Mayor of London.

==== Dame Commander of the Order of the British Empire (DBE) ====
Civil Division

- Mary Lucy Cartwright. For services to Mathematics.
- Daphne du Maurier (Lady Browning), Writer.
- Anna Neagle, CBE, (Florence Marjorie Wilcox), Actress.

Diplomatic Service and Overseas List

State of Victoria

- Rita Mary Buxton, CBE, of Armadale. For philanthropic services.

==== Knight Commander of the Order of the British Empire (KBE) ====
Military Division

- Lieutenant-General Norman Graham Guy Talbot, OBE, TD, QHS, MD, (86207), late Royal Army Medical Corps.
- Acting Air Marshal John Hugh Lapsley, CB, OBE, DFC, AFC, Royal Air Force.

Civil Division

- William Gordon Harris, CB, Director General, Highways, Ministry of Transport.
- The Right Honourable William Brereton Couchman, Baron Merthyr, TD, DL, Chairman of the Magistrates Association.
- Arthur Gordon Norman, CBE, DFC, President, Confederation of British Industry. Chairman, De La Rue Company.

Diplomatic Service and Overseas List

State of Victoria

- Reginald Myles Ansett, of Mount Eliza. For services to the community, particularly to the transport industry.

==== Commander of the Order of the British Empire (CBE) ====
Military Division

Royal Navy

- Commodore Thomas Noel Catlow.
- Captain Michael Arthur John Hennell, MBE, (Retd.).
- Captain George Ashby Looker.
- Commodore Virgil George Tolhurst, VRD*, Royal Naval Reserve.
- Instructor Captain William Harold Watts, OBE.

Army

- Colonel Sydney Curwen, TD, (89066), late Royal Army Medical Corps, Territorial and Army Volunteer Reserve.
- Brigadier Roy Bertram Darkin (363739), late Royal Army Ordnance Corps.
- Brigadier Joseph Leo Dobie (70792), late Corps of Royal Electrical and Mechanical Engineers.
- Brigadier John Keppel Ingold Douglas-Withers, MC, (151389), late Royal Regiment of Artillery.
- Colonel George Huntly Hodgson, OBE, (66101), late Infantry.
- Brigadier William Murray Inglis (64533), late Corps of Royal Engineers.
- Brigadier Donald Ross, OBE, (73054), late Corps of Royal Engineers.
- Colonel George Alexander Sandilands, TD, (193118), late Royal Regiment of Artillery, Territorial and Army Volunteer Reserve.
- Brigadier Benjamin Alfred Sindall (359533), Army Catering Corps.
- Colonel John Francis Weston-Simons, OBE, MC, (95553), late Royal Armoured Corps.

Royal Air Force

- Acting Air Vice-Marshal Richard Trevor Morison, MBE.
- Air Commodore John Cayley Wickham, OBE.
- Group Captain Robert Malcolm Jolly.
- Group Captain Basil Goodhand Lock, AFC.
- Group Captain Aleksander Maisner, AFC.
- Group Captain Michael Peter Stanton.
- Group Captain Arthur George Steele, AFC.
- Group Captain John Stephen Winter, FRCS, FRCS(E).

Civil Division

- Professor Emmanuel Ciprian Amoroso, FRCP, FRCS. For services to Veterinary Physiology.
- Humphrey George Edgar Arthurs, MD, FRCS, Senior Obstetric Physician, Charing Cross Hospital, London.
- Keith Gordon Blake, Assistant Solicitor, Board of Inland Revenue.
- Henry Thomson Blaney, Chief Inspector of Sea Fisheries, Ministry of Agriculture, Fisheries and Food.
- Ritchie Macpherson Campbell, Senior Partner, Babtie, Shaw and Morton, Consulting Engineers.
- Arthur Roy Clapham, Professor of Botany, University of Sheffield.
- Victor Clark, Chief Education Officer, East Riding of Yorkshire.
- Emma Frances Heather Clode, OBE, Vice-Chairman, Women's Royal Voluntary Service.
- Ruth Louisa Cohen. For services to agricultural economics.
- Clements Markham Colbeck, Controller, Southern Division (Civil Aviation), Board of Trade.
- Donald Adolphus Collenette, OBE, Assets Secretary, Church Commissioners.
- William Allister Cook, Lately President, Law Society of Scotland.
- Seymour Donald Mayneord Court, MD, FRCP, James Spence Professor of Child Health, University of Newcastle upon Tyne.
- Thomas Rae Craig, OBE, TD, Group Managing Director, Scottish and Northwest Group, British Steel Corporation.
- Major John Benjamin Davies, MBE, lately National Chairman, British Legion.
- Esmond Samuel de Beer. For services to the Arts.
- Professor Jack Diamond. For services to Civil Defence.
- Ralph William Downes, Organist.
- Walter Bryan Emery, MBE, Professor of Egyptology, University of London.
- David Gwynne Evans, Professor of Bacteriology and Immunology, London School of Hygiene & Tropical Medicine.
- The Very Reverend Seiriol John Arthur Evans, Dean of Gloucester. Chairman of the Council for the Care of Churches. For services to the Arts.
- Hugh Roderick Finn, Chairman, Kent Agricultural Executive Committee.
- Henry George Follenfant, OBE, TD, Chief Civil Engineer, London Transport Board. For services to the construction of the Victoria Line.
- William Fraser, Managing Director (Overseas & Construction Group), British Insulated Callender's Cables Ltd. For services to Export.
- Elisabeth Jean Frink (Mrs. Pool), Sculptor.
- Frederick Garner, Member, Central Training Council.
- Cecil Garstang, Director and General Manager, Thomas Cook & Son Ltd.
- John Frank Goulden, Managing Director, Sheffield Newspapers Ltd.
- Ronald Berry Greenwood, OBE, Chief Constable, Devon and Cornwall Constabulary.
- Edward Noel Griffith, President, Rotary Hoes Ltd. For services to Export.
- Walter Patrick Grove, Director, The Radiochemical Centre. For services to Export.
- Professor Richard Gerald Talbot Guyatt. For services to Graphic Design.
- Thomas Pratt Hall, Headmaster, Percy Junior High School (Boys), Brent.
- Nigel Methuen Beau Hannen, Director, Holland, Hannen & Cubitts Ltd.
- Donald Benjamin Harden, OBE, Director, London Museum.
- William Munger Heynes, Vice Chairman, Director of Engineering, Jaguar Cars Ltd. For services to Export.
- Frederick Taylor Hinkley, Commercial Director, Rolls-Royce Ltd. For services to Export.
- Ralph Hiscox, OBE. Lately Chairman of Lloyd's.
- Norman Hogg. For public services in North-East Scotland.
- Peter Wilfred Essex Holloway, OBE, Chairman, Holloway Brothers (London) Ltd. For services to Export.
- Richard John, Clerk to Glamorgan County Council.
- William Robert Patrick Knox-Johnston. For Seafaring.
- Robin Huws Jones, Principal, National Institute for Social Work Training.
- Edward David Kamm, Chairman, Post Office Users' Council.
- Aileen King, Principal, Edinburgh College of Domestic Science.
- Arthur Edwin Knight. Lately Councillor, Southwark Borough Council.
- Ekkehard von Kuenssberg, MB, ChB, General Medical Practitioner, Edinburgh.
- Walter Moray Lines, Chairman and Managing Director, Lines Brothers Ltd. For services to Export.
- Geoffrey David Lundie, Assistant Secretary, Ordnance Survey.
- John Percival Macey, Director of Housing, Greater London Council.
- Stanley George McKay, Director of Contracts, Ministry of Technology.
- Kenneth Campbell Beveridge Mackenzie, Managing Director, British Home Stores Ltd.
- George Robin Perronet MacLellan, Chairman, George MacLellan Holdings Ltd. For services to Export.
- John McMillan. For services to Television.
- James Dunbar Margach, Political Correspondent, The Sunday Times.
- Henry Ernest Marking, MC, Chief Executive, British European Airways.
- Nevill Francis Marsh, Deputy Chairman, The Electricity Council.
- Royston John Mastel, Deputy Assistant Commissioner, Metropolitan Police.
- Valentine Gilbert Delabere May, Director, Bristol Old Vic Company.
- Ronald Jack Meddings, Town Clerk, Wolverhampton.
- Ernest Leslie Morgan Millar, MD, Medical Officer of Health, City of Birmingham.
- Robert Cecil Miller, Deputy Chief Quantity Surveyor (Director Grade A), Ministry of Public Building and Works.
- Wilfrid Lyonel Miron, OBE, TD, JP, Regional Chairman, East and West Midlands, National Coal Board.
- Henton Morrogh, Director, British Cast Iron Research Association.
- Henry George Munro, TD, General Secretary, National Farmers' Union of Scotland.
- James Hugh Neill, TD, Chairman and Managing Director, James Neill Holdings Ltd. For services to Export.
- Jack Douglas Newth, Joint Managing Director, A. & C. Black Ltd.
- Robert Maurice North, Assistant Secretary, Home Office.
- Stewart Owler. For services to industry on Merseyside.
- Charles Alan Salier Palmer, DSO. For services to the biscuit industry and to Export.
- John Joseph Parkes, Chairman and Managing Director, Alvis Ltd, Coventry. For services to Export.
- Ormonde George Pickard, lately Principal, Ealing Technical College.
- David Emrys Powell, Headmaster, Treorchy Junior Mixed School, Rhondda.
- Hugh Wentworth Pritchard, Solicitor and Parliamentary Agent.
- Alec Harley Reeves, OBE, Senior Principal Research Engineer, Standard Telecommunication Laboratories, Harlow.
- James Nixon Whiteford Ritchie, MB, JP, Past Chairman of the Belfast Water Board.
- James Robertson, Director, London Opera Centre.
- Charles Granville Robinson, MBE, Chairman and Managing Director, Yorkshire Imperial Metals Ltd. For services to Export.
- Alderman Doris Robinson, JP. For services to local government in Stoke-on-Trent.
- Alderman Jean Robinson, JP. For services to local government in Blackpool.
- David Francis Oliphant Russell, MC, DL, Chairman, Tullis Russell & Company Ltd. For services to Export.
- James Herbert Shaw, JP, Chairman, Wool Textile Delegation.
- Thomas Joseph Shaw, MC. A Managing Director, F.M.C. (Meat) Ltd.
- George Fenwick Smith, General Secretary, Amalgamated Society of Woodworkers.
- Frank William Stoneman, MBE, TD, Managing Director, Creed & Company Ltd.
- Joseph John Taylor, OBE. For services to civil aviation.
- George William Job Trowbridge, Deputy Managing Director, Wickmam Ltd. For services to Export.
- Ralph Francis Tyas, Assistant . Secretary, Department of Health and Social Security.
- Edmund Thomas Vallance, ERD, Director (Postal) Scotland, General Post Office.
- Henry Watson, Chief Constable, Cheshire Constabulary.
- Gordon Weston, OBE, lately Associate Director General, British Standards Institution.
- Gilbert Andrew Whitehead, Executive Director and Chief Engineer, Manchester, Hawker Siddeley Aviation Ltd.
- Owen Tudor Williams, Managing Partner, Sir Owen Williams & Partners, Consulting Engineers.
- Denis Smith Poole-Wilson, FRCS, FRCSI, Consultant Urological Surgeon, Salford Royal Hospital, Manchester.
- Francis Wormald. For services to Palaeography.

Diplomatic Service and Overseas List

- James William Anson, Chairman and Managing Director, Mackinnon Mackenzie & Company, Bombay, India.
- Jack Ashworth. For services to British interests in Peru.
- Terence Maurice Attwood, Manager, Chartered Bank, Singapore.
- Stephen Craine Goulden Bach, OBE, British Council Representative, Iran.
- Kenneth James Barnes, MBE, Secretary to the Treasury, Malawi.
- Cyril Frank Baumann, MBE. For services to British interests in Northern Italy.
- Leo Victor de Gale. For services to the community in Grenada.
- George Millar Edington, MBE, Deputy Vice-Chancellor, University of Ibadan, Nigeria.
- Cecily Beatrice Etty-Leal, MBE, Officer on Special Duties, Federal Ministry of Establishments, Nigeria.
- Billy Harry Fox. For services to British interests in Uruguay.
- Duncan Richard Fraser, Manager, Rolls-Royce (Far East) Limited, Tokyo.
- The Right Reverend Anthony Dennis Galvin, Bishop of Lete and Vicar Apostolic, Miri, Sarawak.
- Stanley Gray, Managing Director, Shell B.P. Development Company of Nigeria Limited, Lagos.
- Frank Howarth, MD. For services in Ethiopia under the British Technical Assistance Programme.
- Thomas Edward Orpin, lately Manager of B.O.A.C. for the United States of America in New York.
- The Right Reverend Harold Grant Pigott, Bishop of the Windward Islands.
- William Belcher Greaves Raynor, MBE, MC, lately General Manager, Kenya Tea Development Authority.
- Philip Waller Ridley, Counsellor (Commercial), Her Majesty's Embassy, Washington.
- Roland Smith, lately Director of Agriculture, Sabah, Malaysia.

State of New South Wales

- Judy Cassab. For services to art.
- William Griffith McBride, MD, FRCOG. For services to medicine.

State of Victoria

- Councillor Thomas Richard Flood, Mayor of Bendigo. For services to the community.

State of Queensland

- Wallace George Haydn Best, of Brisbane. For services to commerce and to the community.

State of South Australia

- Joseph Reginald Kearnan, QC, lately Crown Solicitor, South Australian Government.
- John Norman Yeates, Commissioner of Highways and Permanent Head of the Highways and Local Government Department.

State of Western Australia

- William Colin Kennedy Pearse, JP. For services to local government and to agriculture.

State of Tasmania

- Raymond Alfred Ferrall, Master Warden, Port of Launceston Authority.

==== Officer of the Order of the British Empire (OBE) ====
Military Division

Royal Navy

- Commander Anthony Gerald William Bellars, MBE, (Retd.).
- Major Alan Cyril Levin Callaway, MBE, Royal Marines.
- Commander John Hildred Carlill.
- Surgeon Commander George Anand Rurik Giri, LMSSA, DPH.
- Commander Geoffrey Harold Greenish.
- Commander Peter Geoffrey Marshall Herbert.
- Instructor Commander James Herbert Campbell Horton.
- Commander Robert Stuart Scott Ingham, DSC.
- Commander Arthur Charles Wilson Jones, DSC, (Retd.).
- Commander Dennis Feltham Jones, VRD, Royal Naval Reserve.
- Commander Geoffrey Gordon Ward Marsh.
- Commander Richard Neil Pakeman.
- Chief Officer Jean Sutherland Rae, Women's Royal Naval Service.
- Commander Paul Doidge Willcock, (Retd.).

Army

- Lieutenant-Colonel Clifford Adwick (224696), Royal Corps of Transport.
- Lieutenant-Colonel Peter Boucher Cavendish (349894), 14th/20th King's Hussars.
- Lieutenant-Colonel Anthony Constance, TD, (343262), Royal Regiment of Artillery, Territorial and Army Volunteer Reserve.
- Lieutenant-Colonel Wilfred James Charles Griffith Copinger-Symes (364277), The Royal Irish Rangers (27th (Inniskilling) 83rd and 87th).
- Lieutenant-Colonel Kenneth Arthur Foster (155886), 13th/18th Royal Hussars (Queen Mary's Own).
- Lieutenant-Colonel Frederick Heffer (282538), Corps of Royal Electrical and Mechanical Engineers, now retired.
- Lieutenant-Colonel James Stuart Iveson (369646), Royal Corps of Transport; formerly on loan to the Zambia Army.
- Lieutenant-Colonel Hector Andrew Courtney Mackenzie, MC, TD, (74347), 3rd (Territorial) Battalion, Queen's Own Highlanders (Seaforth and Camerons), Territorial and Army Volunteer Reserve, now disbanded.
- Lieutenant-Colonel (acting) Bella Jane Miller (213712), Queen Alexandra's Royal Army Nursing Corps, Territorial and Army Volunteer Reserve, now retired.
- Lieutenant-Colonel Ronald Liddle Murray (352763), Royal Corps of Signals.
- Lieutenant-Colonel John O'Brien, MBE, (349147), Royal Corps of Transport.
- Lieutenant-Colonel Alexander William Raymond Hartley Pettigrew, TD, (327462), Royal Regiment of Artillery, Territorial and Army Volunteer Reserve, now R.A.R.O.
- Lieutenant-Colonel (acting) Charles Richard Randall, TD, (90907), Army Cadet Force.
- Lieutenant-Colonel Ivor Renwick (226990), Royal Army Ordnance Corps.
- Lieutenant-Colonel Eric Ridgeway (261797), Royal Army Ordnance Corps.
- Colonel (acting) Lachlan Robertson, TD, (299681), The Parachute Regiment, Territorial and Army Volunteer Reserve.
- Lieutenant-Colonel Stephen Henry Arthur Scroope (70083), Royal Corps of Transport.
- Lieutenant-Colonel Alfred Thomas Taylor, MBE, (132469), The Light Infantry.
- Colonel (acting) James Douglas Walker (293553), Corps of Royal Engineers.
- Lieutenant-Colonel Phillip John Newling Ward (293484), Welsh Guards.
- Lieutenant-Colonel John Antony Ward-Booth (369352), The Parachute Regiment.
- Lieutenant-Colonel Richard Geoffrey Wilkes, TD, (385029), The Royal Leicestershire Regiment (Territorial), Territorial and Army Volunteer Reserve, now disbanded, now R.A.R.O.
- Lieutenant-Colonel Frank Derek Williams, MBE, (368920), Royal Corps of Signals.
- Lieutenant-Colonel Harry Hazard Wood (261916), The Queen's Royal Irish Hussars.
- Lieutenant-Colonel Michael ffolliott Woodhead (243552), 9th/12th Royal Lancers (Prince of Wales's).

Royal Air Force

- Acting Group Captain Arthur Hale, BEM.
- Acting Group Captain Edgar William Francis Hare.
- Wing Commander Charles Cowell Berry, DFC, (56291).
- Wing Commander Geoffrey Strickland Cooper (57632).
- Wing Commander David Ivor Fairbairn (178972).
- Wing Commander Antony Francis Hignell, MB, BChir, (503808).
- Wing Commander David Mangnall Howorth (82678).
- Wing Commander Bernard Jenkins (59187).
- Wing Commander Robert James Longstaff (59054).
- Wing Commander Kenneth Ernest Richardson (3039387).
- Wing Commander William Jeffrey Roberts (52397).
- Wing Commander Ronald Stone (49489).
- Wing Commander Dennis William Swart (502199).
- Wing Commander Norman Evelyn Arthur Tabor (58201).
- Acting Wing Commander James Stock, DFC, (133771), Royal Air Force Volunteer Reserve (Training Branch).

Civil Division

- Geoffrey Wood Appleyard, Principal Probation Officer, Staffordshire Probation and After-Care Service.
- Archibald Edmund Ash, Deputy Regional Controller, Board of Trade.
- George Reginald Ashton, MBE, lately Clerk and Chief Executive Officer, Keynsham Urban District Council.
- Henry Edwin Ashwood, Director and Editor, Pathé News.
- Arthur Bowden Askey, Comedian.
- Eric Walter John Ball, Composer, Adjudicator and Conductor.
- Major Harry Tracy Barclay, TD, Member, Berkshire County Council.
- Richard Hibbert Barnes, MB, ChB, Chairman, Bee Disease Advisory Committee.
- Robert Alfred Bearman, Chief Executive Officer, Metropolitan Police Office.
- George Coates Bell, JP. For services to local authority health services in Northern Ireland.
- Frederick Victor Bird, Chief Executive Officer, Agricultural Research Council.
- Kenneth Victor Blaiklock. For services in the Antarctic.
- Laurence Walter Blundell, Controller of By-Products, North Thames Gas Board.
- Phyllis Boatwright, lately Senior Administrative Assistant, The Royal Society.
- James Kelvin Bottomley, Director (Production), Albright & Wilson Manufacturing Ltd.
- Sydney Bowman, Chairman, Grimsby and District Local Savings Committee.
- George Bradley, Chairman, Chesterfield Area, National Insurance Tribunal.
- Margaret Elaine Bramall, JP, Director, National Council for the Unmarried Mother and her Child.
- James Breen, Rector, St. Patrick's Roman Catholic High School, Coatbridge.
- Edward Brooks, JP, Councillor, Burnley County Borough.
- Oswald Taylor Brown, MB, FRCP. For services to geriatric medicine.
- William Arthur Brown, Assistant General Manager, Manager, Marketing Department, Navy, Army and Air Force Institutes.
- Norman Frederick Ernest Browning, Town Clerk and Director of Town Development, Winsford Urban District Council.
- George Buchanan, Deputy Chief Ship Surveyor, Lloyd's Register of Shipping.
- Roger Francis Bulstrode, lately Senior Air Traffic Control Officer, Board of Trade.
- James Craig Burgon, Managing Director, J. Burgon & Sons Ltd, Eyemouth.
- Harold Burr, lately Regional Director, National Agricultural Advisory Service, Eastern Region, Ministry of Agriculture, Fisheries and Food.
- Clement George Burrows, MBE, Assistant Chief Constable, Thames Valley Constabulary.
- Harold Ernest Buteux, Chief Technical Officer, Scottish Special Housing Association.
- Michael Joseph Byrne, JP, General Secretary, Scottish Transport and General Workers' Union.
- Edmund Swift Calvert, Chief Officer, Brighton Fire Brigade.
- Robert Charlton. For services to Association Football.
- John William Cheetham, MD, General Medical Practitioner, Widnes.
- Denis Grenville Church, Principal, Board of Trade.
- Donald Clark, Chief Planning Engineer, Central Electricity Generating Board.
- Lieutenant-Colonel John Clark, TD, Chairman, Hexham and District Employment Committee.
- Marjorie Cobby, Chairman, Welfare Committee, West Sussex County Council.
- Charles Jack Coleman, TD, Secretary, Flat Glass Manufacturers' Association. Chairman, Building Materials Export Group. For services to Export.
- William Frederick Cook, Secretary, Medical and Dental Schools, Guy's Hospital.
- Frank William Cooper, Headmaster, Cromwell County Secondary Modern School, Salford.
- Pauline Clothilde Crabbe, JP. For services to Social Welfare.
- James Craigie, Secretary and Editor, Scottish Text Society.
- Kathleen Mary Cripps, JP, Member, Wessex Regional Hospital Board.
- Edgar Dawson, Headmaster, Guard House County Junior School, Keighley.
- Eileen Violet, Lady Denning, Vice-President, Kent Branch, Soldiers', Sailors' and Airmen's Families Association.
- William George Frederick Denton, Manager, National Dock Labour Board.
- William McMillan Dick, MBE, General Manager, Preston Trustee Savings Bank.
- Robert Dobbin, Secretary, Newcastle Regional Hospital Board.
- Basil D'Oliveira. Cricketer.
- John Duncan. For services to the fish trade.
- Alistair Duncanson, Scientific Training Officer for Civil Defence, Scotland.
- John Sinclair Edbrooke, Member of the Council, British Travel Association.
- John Frederick Elam, lately Headmaster, Royal Grammar School, Colchester.
- Walter Elliot. For services to hill farming.
- Charles Elmitt. For services to the Scout Association.
- Frederick Vernon Elvy, Governor, HM Prison Lewes.
- Ann Catherine Elwell, Foreign and Commonwealth Office.
- Maurice Derrick England, Chairman, Chiropodists Board.
- Gordon Page Evans, General Secretary, United Kingdom Committee for Human Rights Year.
- Llywelyn John Evans, Regional Officer, Independent Television Authority, Wales and the West.
- Bernard Melchior Feilden, Architect to York Minster and Norwich Cathedral.
- Herbert Frederick Fisher. For services to the Friendly Societies Movement.
- Gardner Chambers Fletcher, Project Manager, Cammell Laird Training Centre.
- Kenneth Charles Frank Foster, Chairman, Contracts Committee, National Federation of Building Trades Employers.
- Anne Francis, Headmistress, Pontypool County Secondary School for Girls.
- Lieutenant-Colonel Dennis Scott Fead Bult-Francis, Director, United Kingdom Committee, The United Nations Children's Fund.
- Gordon Arthur Franklin, General Secretary, The Shaftesbury Society.
- Percival John Margrie Fry, Chief Executive Officer, Civil Service Department.
- Robert Caddie, Head of Biochemistry Department, Birmingham General Hospital.
- Herbert Charles Garrard, Chairman, Cities of Westminster and London War Pensions and Local Advisory Committees.
- Amy Constance Gentry. For services to Women's Amateur Rowing.
- Evelyn Leslie Gibbs, lately Training Controller, Selfridges Ltd, London.
- Thomas Young Gibson. For services to the timber trade in Scotland.
- John Hardie Glover, Architect, Edinburgh.
- Arnott Leslie Goodrich, Alderman, Torbay County Borough.
- George Herbert Gould, Chairman and Managing Director, Aircraft Materials Ltd. For services to Export.
- Henry Charles Herbert Graves, President, National Council of Concentrate Manufacturers.
- Charles Raylton Gray, MBE, South Western Regional Member, National Savings Committee.
- Howard Frederick Griffiths, MBE, Chief Officer, Suffolk and Ipswich Fire Brigade.
- Harry William Hadaway, Assistant Chief London Signal Engineer, London Transport Board.
- Walter Hall, Headmaster, Brownlow Fold Boys' County Secondary School, Bolton.
- Jeffrey Hubert Hamm, Chairman, Hong Kong Association.
- Benjamin Henry Harvey, Principal, Essex Institute of Agriculture.
- Captain James Clark Harvey, Senior Master, The Ben Line Steamers Ltd.
- Sidney George D'Arcy Dance Hawkey. For services to the Magistracy in Beacontree.
- Alfred Hesler, BEM, Secretary, Durham Area, National Union of Mineworkers.
- Denis Raymond Hicklin, Chairman and Managing Director, St. Anne's Board Mill Company Ltd.
- Carleton Percy Hobbs, Actor.
- Leslie Ernest Hockin, District Alkali Inspector, Ministry of Housing and Local Government.
- Keith Holman, TD, LDS, Dental Practitioner. Chairman, Lancashire Local Dental Committee (died, 3 June 1969).
- Stephen Nicholas Horvat, Farmer, Suffolk. For services to agricultural co-operation.
- Hugh Stuart Howat, Assistant Director, Directorate of Aircraft Production, Ministry of Technology.
- Thomas Howie, lately General Manager, Fibres Group, Imperial Chemical Industries (Europa) Ltd. For services to Export.
- The Reverend Canon David Keith Stather Hunt, TD, For services as Chaplain, HM Prison Oxford.
- Horace Robert Irving, Children's Officer, Lancashire County Council.
- Lieutenant-Colonel Harvey Morro Harvey-Jamieson, TD, DL, Secretary, Company of Merchants of the City of Edinburgh.
- David John Jeffries, Manager for France, British Travel Association.
- Frank Johnston. Lately Town Clerk, Middleton Borough, Manchester.
- Garnet Everard Jones, Director-in-Charge, R.T.B. Division, British Steel Corporation.
- Gwendolen Eluned Jones, JP, lately Chairman, Cardiganshire County Council.
- John Trevor Richardson-Jones, Chairman, Denbighshire Agricultural Executive Committee.
- John Judge, Chief Inspector, Dundee Branch, Royal Scottish Society for the Prevention of Cruelty to Children.
- Elizabeth Effie Keighley, LRCP, LRCS. Lately Consultant Physician to HM Prison Holloway.
- Robert Robertson Laird, Chairman, South Essex Local Advisory Committee.
- Bruce Langley, MBE. Lately Chief Information Officer (B), Ministry of Defence.
- Major Stanley Gerald Last, attached Ministry of Defence.
- Maurice Brinsmead Latey, Editor, Talks and Features, External Broadcasting, British Broadcasting Corporation.
- Kenneth Laybourn, Deputy Chief Education Officer, Manchester.
- Frederick Royden Lee, Joint Chief Investment Manager, Public Trustee Office.
- Alderman Haydn Lewis, JP. For social and local government services in Carmarthenshire.
- Maurice Arthur Liddell, Member, Central Council, Royal Air Forces Association.
- Robert Arthur Long, Executive Director, Passenger, British Railways Board.
- Edmund Lord. Lately Deputy Chief Inspector of Training (Technical), Department of Employment and Productivity.
- Arthur Walter Lucas, Chief Restorer, National Gallery.
- William Leslie Lyall, Managing Director, Peter Scott & Company Ltd. For services to Export.
- Robin Home McCall, Town Clerk, City of Winchester.
- Edward Henry McGale, Grade I Officer, Department of Employment and Productivity.
- Donald Graham McGarey, Chief Engineer, British Transport Docks Board.
- Leonard Charles Madsen, Chairman, Lee Valley Experimental Horticulture Station Advisory Committee.
- Rowland Arthur Marriott, Foreign and Commonwealth Office.
- Arthur Eric Martin, Chairman, Construction Industry Training Board, Northern Ireland.
- George Martin, MBE, Principal, Ministry of Health and Social Services for Northern Ireland.
- Leonard Mason, Senior Research Officer, Board of Trade.
- Hugh Metcalfe, Manager (G.W. Projects), Guided Weapons Division, British Aircraft Corporation Ltd. For services to Export.
- Alfred James Miller, MBE, Actuary and General Manager, Aberdeen Savings Bank.
- Alfred Edgar Milward. For services to the community in Reading.
- John Archibald Montgomery, Farmer, Somerset. For services to agriculture and horticulture.
- May Emily Moody, Chief Executive Officer, HM Treasury.
- Frank Morgan, Senior Superintendent, Chemistry Division, Aldermaston, United Kingdom Atomic Energy Authority.
- Vernon Eversfield Morgan, lately Sports Editor, Reuters.
- Peter John Morley, Producer, Thames Television Ltd.
- Margaret Jane Morrison, Adviser in Social Work, Social Work Services Group, Scottish Office.
- Elspeth Lillias Hope-Murray, Deputy Chief Social Work Officer, Department of Health and Social Security.
- Ernest William Naisbitt, lately Deputy General Secretary, National Union of Teachers.
- Frank Alexander Newhouse, Chairman and Managing Director, Readicut International Ltd, Wakefield. For services to Export.
- Kenneth Garnar Newton, MBE, TD, Managing Director, James Garnar & Sons Ltd. For services to Export.
- Charles Norman Fellows Odgers, Principal, Ministry of Overseas Development.
- Cyril Oettinger, AFC, Director, Oneida Silversmiths Ltd. For services to Export.
- Captain Harold William Taliesin Owen, Chief Superintendent, Trinity House Depot, Harwich.
- Leonard Paule Palmer, Personnel Controller, London Postal Region, General Post Office.
- John Semple Penman, Chairman, Dumfries-shire and Kirkcudbrightshire Youth Employment Committee.
- Neil Pentland, Senior Regional Scientific Adviser for Civil Defence, South Eastern Region.
- Peter John Charles Perry, Director and Secretary, British Association for Commercial and Industrial Education.
- Richard Frederick Richmond Phillips, Head of Economics Department, Sutton Manor High School for Boys.
- Brigadier John Rowley Innes Platt, DSO, Lately Secretary, Wiltshire Territorial and Auxiliary Forces Association.
- Marjorie Rebecca Proops, Columnist, Daily Mirror.
- Stephen Rhodes, Secretary, Rural District Councils Association.
- Dennis Lionel Thomas Rider, Director, Glass Manufacturers' Federation.
- Arthur Douglas Roberts. For services to health in the West Riding of Yorkshire.
- Francis Reginald Roberts, MB, ChB, General Medical Practitioner, Shenstone, Staffordshire.
- Herman Leslie Roberts, London Industrial Correspondent, The Birmingham Post.
- Eric Robinson. For services to Music.
- Stanley Robinson, lately Head of The Times Parliamentary Staff.
- Thomas Osborne Robinson, Director, Northampton Theatre.
- Derek Prior Rogers. For services to Rugby Football.
- Edmund Whiting Roythorne, MBE, Chairman, Lincolnshire (Holland) National Health Service Executive Council.
- William James Lyon Rushworth, JP. For services to the community on Merseyside.
- Henry Lightbown Schollick, Director, B. H. Blackwell Ltd. For services to Export.
- George Sharp, JP, Chairman, Finance Committee, Fife County Council.
- James McGregor Sinclair, MBE, JP, Director and Deputy Chairman, A. I. Welders Ltd, Inverness. For services to Export.
- Marjorie Edith Small, Principal, Department of Education and Science.
- Rex Abbott Smith, Chairman, British Light Aviation Centre.
- Philip Gordon Smyrk, Executive Director, Johnson, Matthey & Company Ltd. For services to Export.
- Ian Naismith Sneddon, Simson Professor of Mathematics, University of Glasgow.
- Alderman Philip Squire, JP, Chairman, Welsh Sports Council.
- William James Frederick Steel, Headmaster, France Hill County Secondary School, Camberley.
- Daniel Strachan, General Secretary, St. Andrew's Ambulance Association.
- Howard Surtees, Managing Director, Elliott-Automation Space & Advanced Military Systems Ltd.
- Doris Taplin, RRC, Regional Nursing Officer, Liverpool Regional Hospital Board.
- Leonard Morris Tate, Chairman, No. 1169 (Exeter) Squadron Committee, Air Training Corps.
- Thomas Taylor, JP, Councillor, Blackburn County Borough.
- David Tempest, JP, Councillor, Kirkby Urban District Council.
- Edgar John Edward Tickle, Deputy Assistant Commissioner, Metropolitan Police.
- Frank Purser Tindall, County Planning Officer, East Lothian County Council.
- Norman John Tolliday, Senior Chief Executive Officer, Ministry of Technology.
- John Turner, Vice-Chairman, East Suffolk County Council.
- Malcolm Turner, JP, lately Provost of Clydebank Burgh.
- Arnold Tweedale, JP, Chairman, Oldham and Ashton-under-Lyne Local Advisory Committee.
- Herbert William Vallender, Director of Trade Affairs, Chemical Industries Association.
- Lewis Edward Van Moppes, Chairman and Joint Managing Director, L. M. Van Moppes & Sons Ltd. For services to Export.
- The Reverend Edward Chad Varah. For services to the Samaritans.
- Joseph Henry Wall, JP. For social and local government services in Liverpool.
- Bertram Waring, President, West Riding of Yorkshire Accident Prevention Federation.
- William Edward Watson, Deputy Chief Constable, Staffordshire County and Stoke-on-Trent Constabulary.
- William Watt, Senior Principal Scientific Officer, Royal Aircraft Establishment, Farnborough, Ministry of Technology.
- Harry Gowland Webber, Principal Overseas Representative, Salvage Association, North America.
- Simon Wernick, Honorary Secretary General, Institute of Metal Finishing.
- Robert Leslie Wessel, Chairman, National College for the Training of Youth Leaders, Leicester.
- George Edward Dudley Whitaker, Chairman, Sperry Rand Ltd. For services to Export.
- Edmund Reay White, MBE, Northern Regional Member, National Savings Committee.
- Edwin Peter Blake White, Chief Constable, Gloucestershire Constabulary.
- Harry White, Honorary Treasurer, Royal Society for the Prevention of Cruelty to Animals.
- Kenneth Thomas Wild, lately Managing Director, Thomas C. Wild & Sons Ltd. For services to Export.
- Geoffrey Light Wilde, Chief Engineer, Aero Engine Division, Rolls-Royce Ltd. For services to Export.
- Dora Myfanwy Williams, Superintendent of the Home Nursing Service, City of Plymouth.
- Gareth Crwys Williams, HM Inspector of Schools, Department of Education and Science.
- Raymond Geoffrey Williams, Secretary, National Institute of Oceanography.
- William David Williams, Director of Operations, Revlon Overseas Corporation, Maesteg, Glamorgan. For services to Export.
- Rosina Winslade. For services to the Women's Engineering Society.
- Lilian Wood, JP, Chairman, Lancashire Association of Youth Clubs.
- Edith Mary Wright, Chief Executive Officer, Ministry of Transport.

Diplomatic Service and Overseas List

- Franklyn Cunningham Adams. For public services in Saint Christopher-Nevis-Anguilla.
- Cyril Donald Aidney, DFC. For public services in Fiji.
- Stanley Robert Airey, Her Majesty's Consul, New York.
- Patrick Edmund Homfray Alexander, lately Manager, British Bank of the Middle East, Beirut.
- James Aidan Robb Anderson, MC, Deputy Conservator of Forests, Sarawak, Malaysia.
- John Denison Kingston Argles, British Council Regional Representative, Madras, South India.
- Kenneth Myer Arthur Barnett, ED, JP, Commissioner of Census and Statistical Planning, Hong Kong.
- Samuel Benady, QC. For services to the community in Gibraltar.
- Clifton Donald Borer, lately Chairman, Bahamas Electricity Corporation.
- Charles John Briggs, Construction Manager, Isa New Town project, Bahrain.
- Lieutenant-Colonel Douglas Jeffrey Cairns, MBE, Senior British Representative, International Observer Team in Nigeria.
- Findlay Cessford, Malaysian Representative, Ben Line Steamers Limited.
- Dennis Seymour Clarke, MC, British Council Regional Director, Hamburg, Germany.
- Commander Trevor Cole, Royal Indian Navy (Retd.). For services to British interests in the Argentine Republic.
- Major George Derek Cooper, MC. For services in disaster areas overseas.
- John Cooper, General Manager, Public Transport Service Corporation, Trinidad and Tobago.
- George Edwin Coster, Head of Special Branch, Royal Brunei Police Force.
- Donald Towler Cox, Her Majesty's Consul, Düsseldorf, Germany.
- George Ian Cullen, Acting Accountant-General, Sabah, Malaysia.
- Donald James Dallas, lately Adviser to the National News Agency of Malaysia.
- The Reverend Raymund Devas, OP, MC. For services to the community in Grenada.
- Jack Shawcross Dixon, First Secretary, Her Majesty's Embassy, Rome.
- Donald Charles Douglas, Director, Australian British Trade Association, Canberra.
- Harry Fang Sin-yang, MCh.Orth, FRCS. For services to the community in Hong Kong.
- Olva Winfred Flax, MBE, lately Permanent Secretary, External Affairs and Defence, Antigua.
- Frank Lugard Fraser, Group Senior Representative and Northern Property Manager, United Africa Company of Nigeria Ltd, Kaduna, Northern Nigeria.
- Bryan Reginald Fuller, Director of Forests and Game, Malawi.
- Charles Gardner, lately First Secretary, British High Commission, Lagos.
- Margaret Shiell Harbottle, Professor of English, University of Peshawar, Pakistan.
- John Edgar Young Hardcastle, Acting Director, Federal Department of Agricultural Research, Nigeria.
- Kenneth Douglas Harrap, lately Secretary and Commissioner for Labour, Fiji.
- James Ronald Harries, FRCP, MD. For services to the community in Kenya.
- Kenneth Houston Dalrymple Hay. For public services in the British Solomon Islands Protectorate.
- John Douglas Hellings. For services to British interests in Malaysia.
- John James Hunter, lately First Secretary, Hong Kong.
- Robert Charles Johnston, MBE. For services to British interests in Costa Rica.
- Merlin Winston Jones, British Council Representative, Norway.
- Sydney Hyde Kemsley, Director, Transport Control Department, Bermuda.
- Paul Victor St. John Killick, First Secretary, Her Majesty's Embassy, Cape Town.
- Camille David Meredith Le Clair, Deputy Commissioner of Police, Nigeria.
- Lee Quo-wei, JP. For public services in Hong Kong.
- Betty Lester. For services to Anglo-American relations in Kentucky, United States of America.
- Douglas George Lomax, Head of Special Branch, Malawi Police.
- John Leonard McGrath, First Secretary, British High Commission, Wellington.
- Donald Lloyd Matheson. For services to the community in Saint Christopher-Nevis-Anguilla.
- Sydney St. Alban Meade, Administrative Secretary, Montserrat.
- Gordon Westall Meggitt, Deputy Director of Lands and Surveys, Sabah, Malaysia.
- The Reverend Raymond John Walton Morris, Honorary Chaplain, Her Majesty's Embassy, Paris.
- Alexander Lawrence Morrison. For services to British interests in Germany.
- The Reverend Robert William Murray, Presbyterian Mission, Vila, Efaite, New Hebrides.
- James Douglas Bertie Panton, Superintendent Engineer, Sarawak, Malaysia.
- Daniel Graham Parsons. For services to the British community in the Sudan.
- David Morris Pearson, MBE, lately Head of Chancery and First Secretary, Her Majesty's Embassy, Kinshasa.
- John Mitchell Peel. For services to British interests in Spain.
- Hugh Keen Pierpoint. For services to British interests in Luanda, Angola.
- Shapour Ardeshirji Reporter. For services to British interests in Iran.
- Sandy Rosdol, First Secretary, Her Majesty's Embassy, Ankara.
- Lambert Stewart Ross, First Secretary, Her Majesty's Embassy, Manila.
- Michael Alexander Rozalla, MB, Deputy Director of Medical Services, Sarawak, Malaysia.
- Douglas Roy Salt, Managing Director, Caxton Press (West Africa), Limited, Ibadan, Northern Nigeria.
- Serge Marc Savy, Deputy Director of Agriculture, Seychelles.
- Richard Smeathers, lately Conservator of Forests, Sarawak, Malaysia.
- Crispin Anselm Sorhaindo, Financial Secretary, Dominica.
- Francis Augustus Squire, Adviser Entomologist, British Tropical Agricultural Mission in Bolivia.
- Francis de Fontaine Stratton, Principal Magistrate, Hong Kong.
- Archibald Cameron Syme, Head of Chemistry Department, University of Ife, Western Nigeria.
- John Henderson Taylor, MBE, Adviser on Technical Education to Trucial States Council, Dubai.
- Rivers Fendall Thompson, MBE, Acting Permanent Secretary, Ministry of Justice, Lesotho.
- Wing Commander Edward Maurice Ware, DFC, Director of Civil Aviation, Bermuda.
- John Cameron Watson. For services to British interests in South India.
- Alexander Munro Welsh, British Council Representative, Portugal.
- John Joseph Wilson, Head of the British Geological Team in Peru.

State of New South Wales

- Herbert Francis Benning. For services to the community.
- Maurice Herman Kellerman. For services to education.
- William Alan Gould Kesterton. For services to local government.
- James Claude Macdougall. For services to journalism.
- Neil McLeod. For services to the welfare of Spastic children and adults.
- Andrew Distin Morgan, MB, ChM. For services to the community in the field of medicine.
- Sydney William Gardiner Ratcliff, MB, ChB. For services to medicine.

State of Victoria

- Henry Alfred Braithwaite, of Camberwell. For services to pharmacy.
- John Russell Conabere, of Brighton. For services in the field of life saving.
- Captain Jessie Margaret Langham, of Ballarat. For services to the nursing profession.
- Alfred Oscar Platt Lawrence, of Camberwell. For services to the Scouting Movement.
- The Reverend Doctor James Keith Wilson Mathieson, of Burwood. For services to child welfare.
- Alice Trevin Stewart, of Camberwell. For services to the Country Women's Association.

State of Queensland

- John James Ahern, of Conondale. For services to the dairy industry.
- Sydney George McDonald, of Brisbane. For services to the community.
- Thomas Wilson, of Brisbane. For services to industry and to the community.

State of South Australia

- Cora Barclay. For services to the education of deaf children.
- Robert Edward Graham, of West Croyden. For services to amateur athletics.
- Eric Davies Sims, of Barmera. For services to the dried fruit industry and to the community.

State of Western Australia

- Ronald Francis Carroll, JP. For services to local government and to the community.
- Leslie Western Nenke, JP. For services to local government and to the community.

State of Tasmania

- James Frederick Charles O'Brien. For services to local government.

==== Member of the Order of the British Empire (MBE) ====
Military Division

Royal Navy

- Lieutenant-Commander Graham John Balchin; formerly serving with the British Joint Services Training Team, Ghana.
- Lieutenant-Commander David Erskine Charles Barratt; on loan to the Royal Malaysian Navy.
- Lieutenant-Commander Harold William Barrett.
- Supply Lieutenant-Commander Arthur George Battin.
- Lieutenant-Commander Martin Frederic Bright, (Retd.).
- Lieutenant-Commander (S.D.) Bernard Credland.
- Engineer Lieutenant Kenneth Robert Finney.
- Lieutenant (G.S.) William Wilfred Harris, Royal Marines (Retd.).
- Engineer Lieutenant-Commander Andrew Thomas Hawkes.
- Wardmaster Lieutenant-Commander Glyn Owen Jones.
- Lieutenant-Commander Philip Compton Masson, Royal Naval Reserve.
- First Officer Sheila Gibson Pert, Women's Royal Naval Service (Retd.).
- Captain Albert Edward Pottle, Royal Marines.
- Lieutenant-Commander Christopher John Ringrose-Voase.

Army

- 22246111 Warrant Officer Class I Keith Laurence Anderson, Corps of Royal Electrical and Mechanical Engineers.
- Major John Desmond Bastick (418193), Royal Tank Regiment.
- Captain (Quartermaster) Ronald Baylis (473078), The Royal Anglian Regiment.
- Captain William Souter Bennett (483096), The Lancashire Regiment (Prince of Wales's Volunteers).
- 2993587 Warrant Officer Class I Peter John Phillip Bing, The Parachute Regiment.
- Major John Nicolas Blashford-Snell (453555), Corps of Royal Engineers.
- 14469470 Warrant Officer Class I Thomas Geoffrey Cable, Corps of Royal Electrical and Mechanical Engineers; formerly serving with the British Joint Services Training Team, Jamaica.
- Captain Ronald William Careless (126185), Corps of Royal Engineers, Territorial and Army Volunteer Reserve.
- Major Daphne Pamela Chandler (432627), Women's Royal Army Corps.
- Major John Lyon Chapple (410821), 2nd King Edward VII's Own Gurkha Rifles (The Sirmoor Rifles).
- 1931967 Warrant Officer Class I Maurice Edward Clark, The Royal Irish Rangers (27th (Inniskilling) 83rd & 87th).
- Major Nigel David Clifford (435014), Corps of Royal Engineers.
- Major (acting) Harry Cooper (384180), Combined Cadet Force.
- Major Richard David Crawford Clarke, TD, (419544), Royal Army Ordnance Corps, Territorial and Army Volunteer Reserve.
- Captain (Quartermaster) Alan Dobson (474883), Grenadier Guards.
- 22771232 Warrant Officer Class II Malcolm Edward Dooley, Corps of Royal Engineers.
- Major Gordon Duncan (339366), The Gordon Highlanders.
- 22540155 Warrant Officer Class I Geoffrey Richard Elliott, Royal Corps of Transport.
- Major (Quartermaster) Dan Furr (450700), The Light Infantry.
- Captain Robert James Fyfe (465763), The King's Own Royal Border Regiment, now R.A.R.O.
- Major Peter Frederick William Gahan (278710), Royal Corps of Signals.
- Captain John Robert Pelham Gibbons, TD, (385061), Royal Army Medical Corps, Territorial and Army Volunteer Reserve.
- 14877065 Warrant Officer Class I Allen Stanley Gibbs, Corps of Royal Military Police.
- Major John Henry Hild (420855), Royal Corps of Signals.
- Major John Roland Marshal Hill (420856), Corps of Royal Engineers.
- Major Thomas Arnett Hughes-Ross (186426), Royal Corps of Transport.
- Captain (T.O.T.) Robin William Vernon Hutley (467154), Royal Corps of Signals.
- 22530348 Warrant Officer Class II, Henry John Jenkins, The Hampshire and Isle of Wight Territorials, Territorial and Army Volunteer Reserve, now disbanded, now retired.
- Major James Guy Lauder (403517), Corps of Royal Engineers.
- 14027999 Warrant Officer Class II Derek Linford, Royal Army Ordnance Corps.
- 23524033 Warrant Officer Class II Ronald Frederick Percy McGinley, 7th (Territorial) Battalion, The Queen's Regiment, Territorial and Army Volunteer Reserve, now disbanded.
- Major (Quartermaster) Duncan McMillan (451608), Royal Corps of Transport, now R.A.R.O.
- Major Thomas Keith Rivers Marlow (129846), Corps of Royal Engineers.
- Major John Stuart Messervy (373279), Royal Corps of Transport.
- Lieutenant Charles Albert Moss (486581), Royal Army Ordnance Corps.
- Major (Quartermaster) George Mullett (450412), The Royal Irish Rangers, (27th (Inniskilling) 83rd & 87th).
- Major Robert Paul Norwood (393232), Royal Corps of Transport, formerly on loan to the Malaysian Armed Forces.
- 14447066 Warrant Officer Class II Edward Oliver, The Queen's Own Hussars.
- Captain Frank Penfold (477013), Corps of Royal Electrical and Mechanical Engineers.
- Major Herbert James Pike (339906), Royal Army Ordnance Corps.
- Major (acting) Reginald Putman (332407), Army Cadet Force.
- Major Peter John Richings (365770), Royal Regiment of Artillery.
- Major Sydney Leon Rooth (424458), Corps of Royal Engineers.
- Major Thomas Sampson (387845), Army Catering Corps.
- 22808074 Warrant Officer Class I Edward Francis Smith, Royal Army Medical Corps.
- Major (Quartermaster) Arthur William Steane (454522), 10th Princess Mary's Own Gurkha Rifles.
- 21018197 Warrant Officer Class I Walter James Swinney, Royal Army Ordnance Corps.
- 22304287 Warrant Officer Class II Henry Walter Waller, Royal Regiment of Artillery.
- Major (acting) John Wilshaw (374771), Army Cadet Force.
- Major (acting) Kenneth Wilson (385974), The Royal Scots (The Royal Regiment).
- 22520542 Warrant Officer Class I Robert Wilson, Army Catering Corps.

Overseas Awards

- Captain Wilfred Osmond Barzey, Montserrat Defence Force.
- Major Ivor Gerald Daniel, ED, The Hong Kong Regiment (The Volunteers).

Royal Air Force

- Squadron Leader Thomas Wilfred Peter Clifford, DFC, (56236).
- Squadron Leader Arthur Charles Cooper (53442), (Retd.).
- Squadron Leader Reginald Thomas Manning Dennehey (195322).
- Squadron Leader Gordon Cyril Dyer (4113072).
- Squadron Leader Derek Keith Empson (3507622).
- Squadron Leader James Peter Fereday (57440).
- Squadron Leader Deryck Alexander Hankin (58307).
- Squadron Leader Richard Treharne Holloway (701642), for services with the British Joint Services Training Team, Zambia.
- Squadron Leader Frederick William Jones (531623).
- Squadron Leader Ronald Leah Kerr (177034).
- Squadron Leader John Howard James Merriman (193127).
- Squadron Leader Milton Henry Trevor Molloy (142845).
- Squadron Leader Frank Alfred Bernard Newton (195223).
- Squadron Leader John Patrick Hugh O'Neill, AFC, (2443722).
- Squadron Leader Walter Kenneth Ongley (45982).
- Squadron Leader James Cameron Robertson (2529433).
- Squadron Leader Kenneth Andrew Tweedie (58007).
- Squadron Leader John Naunton Walter (505064).
- Flight Lieutenant Alexander Begg (3031012), (Retd.).
- Flight Lieutenant John Hunt Cruickshank (547185).
- Flight Lieutenant Donald Geddes, DFC, (186735), for services with the Royal Malaysian Air Force.
- Flight Lieutenant Ivor William Gosling, BEM, (525626).
- Flight Lieutenant Richard Derrick Parkin (507384).
- Flight Lieutenant David Gerald Robinson (4101206).
- Flight Lieutenant Edward Arthur Robinson (197079).
- Flight Lieutenant Christopher Tinkler (1893437).
- Acting Flight Lieutenant Lewis Gordon (566260), Royal Air Force Volunteer Reserve (Training Branch).
- Acting Flight Lieutenant Dennis Edward Whitby (573153).
- Warrant Officer Robert Bancroft (LO611611).
- Warrant Officer John Cleary (AO542103).
- Warrant Officer Percy Cooke (GO533465).
- Warrant Officer Harold Cornes (EO638147).
- Warrant Officer Donald George Culley (VO577511).
- Warrant Officer Terence Ernest James Flatt, BEM, (RO574958).
- Warrant Officer Donald John Hooper (VO926657).
- Warrant Officer Michael Patterson McCowie (UO619268).
- Warrant Officer William John Smyth, BEM, (V1129584).

Civil Division

- Bella Mimi Ainley, Regional Food Organiser, London Region, Women's Royal Voluntary Service.
- Agnes Anderson Aitken, Senior Assistant Secretary, Scottish Branch, British Red Cross Society.
- Joyce Oliver Alexander, Alderman, Bexhill Borough Council.
- Morley Richard Allen, Contracts Estimator, E.B.C. & Sleeman, Ltd, Exeter.
- Henry John Alp, Higher Executive Officer, Department of Economic Affairs.
- May Anderson, Member, Midlothian and West Lothian Local Savings Committees.
- William James Anderson. For services to the community in the Campbeltown area, Argyll.
- Cedric Angove, Safety Engineer, General Electric Company/Associated Electrical Industries (Electronics) Ltd, Leicester.
- Marjorie Alice Apps, Honorary Secretary, Portsmouth Schools National Savings Committee.
- Frank Ashmore, Deputy Headmaster, Penarth County Secondary School.
- Georgina Gladys Babbs. For services to the National Blood Transfusion Service.
- Herbert William Baldock, Export Manager, Commercial Plastics Ltd, Cramlington, Northumberland. For services to Export.
- Annie Ellen Balsdon, Sister-in-Charge, St. George Health Centre, Bristol.
- Kathleen Doris Bannister, Higher Executive Officer, Ministry of Defence.
- Louis Barber, JP, General Manager, Leeds Trustee Savings Bank.
- Peter John Parkes Barker, Lately Chairman, Royal Naval Volunteer Reserve Officers' Association.
- Clifford Frank Barnes, Executive Engineer, London Postal Region, General Post Office.
- Jonah Paul Barrington. For services to Squash Rackets.
- Theodora Ann Barstow, JP, Divisional Safety Inspector, Ministry of Agriculture, Fisheries and Food.
- Arthur Basen, BEM, Chairman, Kempston Urban District Local Savings Committee.
- Eric John Batten, Chief Draughtsman, Ministry of Defence.
- Harry Alfred Halstead Beech, Higher Executive Officer, HM Land Registry.
- John Clement Bell, Manager, Tinsley and Dunlop Street Works, The Firth-Denhon Stampings Ltd.
- Horace Sydney Bendell, Inspector of Taxes (Higher Grade), Board of Inland Revenue.
- Marjorie Catherine Bennett, Sister to the Alms Houses, Ewelme, Oxfordshire.
- William Frederick Bennett, Honorary Secretary and Treasurer, East Devon Flood Appeal Fund.
- David William Bennion, Sales Director, Graesser Salicylates Ltd, Sandycroft, Flintshire. For services to Export.
- Archibald Hunter-Bill, Principal Officer of Nursing Services, Long Grove Hospital, Epsom, Surrey.
- Edward Charles Bilson, Finance Officer, Council of Social Service for Wales and Monmouthshire.
- Mabel Lilian Patricia Bingham, Editor, British Book News, British Council.
- Charles Birnie, Secretary to the Governors, Robert Gordon's Colleges, Aberdeen.
- Samuel Black, Head of Exhibition and Publicity Department and Editor of the Journal, London Chamber of Commerce. For services to Export.
- George Rooking Blackburn, Secretary, Cammell Laird Workmen's Welfare Committee.
- Sybil Eileen Blowers, Headmistress, Burdett-Coutts and Townshend Foundation Junior Mixed School, Westminster.
- Stanley Harold Boughen, Area Welfare Officer and Mental Welfare Officer, Norfolk County Council.
- Leonard Bourne, Secretary to the Chief Constable, Kingston-upon-Hull.
- George James Bowles, Deputy Assistant Chief Officer, London Fire Brigade.
- Andrew McGhee Boyd, Honorary Secretary, Paisley Unit Sea Cadet Corps Committee.
- Lieutenant-Commander Francis Lano Brooks, RD, Royal Naval Reserve, Lately Contracts Engineer, Esso Petroleum Company Ltd.
- Evaline Brown, Controller of Typists, Ministry of Public Building and Works.
- Irene Edith Brown. Lately Higher Executive Officer, Department of Education and Science.
- Sydney Coulter Brown, Honorary Secretary, Zeebrugge (1918) Association.
- John Bulkeley, Head Postmaster, Caernarvon, General Post Office.
- John Russell Burns, Executive Officer (Wayleaves), South of Scotland Electricity Board.
- Elsie Dorothy Burrows, Chairman, Harrow National Savings Street and Social Groups Committee.
- Walter Butcher. For services to the community in Cumberland.
- Dorothy Barton Calverley, Senior Inspector, Harrogate, National Society for the Prevention of Cruelty to Children.
- James Dawson Campbell, General Manager, The Savings Bank of Glasgow.
- Sidney George Carlow, Senior Administrative Officer, City and Guilds of London Institute.
- Thomas Graham Castle, Rural Industries Organiser for Northamptonshire.
- Samuel Thomas Charles, Senior Investigation Officer, Board of Customs and Excise.
- Walter Frederick Charlton, Chief Engineer, British European Airways Helicopters Ltd.
- Henry Cheetham, Senior Executive Engineer, General Post Office.
- John William Chenery, lately Trawler Skipper, Milford Haven.
- George Edward Cholerton, Chairman, Bexley, Dartford and District War Pensions Committee.
- Agnes Christie, Member, Executive Committee, North Eastern Prison After-Care Society.
- Joseph Church, DFM, Security Officer Grade I, Ministry of Defence.
- Vernon James St. Clair Clancey, Senior Scientific Officer, Ministry of Defence.
- Betty Clark, Headmistress, Grafton School for Educationally Sub-normal Children.
- Jessica Clarke, lately Headmistress, Pear Tree Secondary School for Girls, Derby.
- Edgar Claxton, Fixed Equipment and Projects Engineer, British Railways Board.
- Albert Eric Clayton, Managing Director, Cosmic Crayon Company Ltd, Bedford. For services to Export.
- Rosemary Clifford (Mrs. Fighiera), Head of Transatlantic Group, Overseas Press Services, Central Office of Information.
- Jesse Clough, Works Technical Grade "B", Ministry of Public Building and Works.
- Geoffrey Francis Cobbold, Senior Lecturer, Royal Naval College, Dartmouth, Ministry of Defence.
- Invicta Rex Cogbill, Chief Superintendent, Staffordshire County and Stoke-on-Trent Constabulary.
- Captain Arthur William Cole, Physical Recreation Adviser, National Association of Boys' Clubs.
- Thomas Henry Cole, Chief Metallurgist, Neepsend Steel & Tool Corporation Ltd.
- Laurence Edward Collinson, Senior Assistant Land Commissioner, Ministry of Agriculture, Fisheries and Food.
- Ernest Conway, Headmaster, Kingston County Secondary Boys School, Stafford.
- Lettice Corfield, Assistant Matron, Hammersmith Hospital.
- Brian Leonard Cornford, Safety Officer, Plastics Division, Imperial Chemical Industries, Ltd.
- Henry Willie Southward Cornish, Foreign and Commonwealth Office.
- John Rupert Crane, Director, Copper Group, Imperial Metal Industries Ltd.
- Benjamin Wilson Crewdson, Lately Sales Director, Cosalt Ltd, Grimsby. For services to Export.
- Charles Ronald Croome. For services to the Scout Association in Barry, Glamorgan.
- John William Crosby, lately Honorary Secretary, Leeds and District Spastics Society.
- Sidney Harold Cross. For services to Mountain Rescue in the Lake District.
- Alexander Steele Davidson, Works Manager (Chemical Plant) Windscale and Calder Works, United Kingdom Atomic Energy Authority.
- David John Davies, Chief Officer, Merthyr Tydfil Fire Brigade.
- George David Davies, DSC, Export Manager, Lewis Woolf Griptight Ltd. For services to Export.
- John Michael Davis, Air Traffic Control Officer, Grade III, Board of Trade.
- William George Davis, Superintendent of Stares, Board of Customs and Excise.
- Arthur Burfitt Dawson, Headmaster, Hillcrest School, Northumberland.
- Enid Rosina Day. For services to the Women's Royal Voluntary Service in Wales.
- Philip Glyn Deadman. For services to youth in Liverpool.
- Stanley Arthur Devon, Staff Photographer, The Sunday Times.
- Mildred Elizabeth Constance Dibden. For services to deprived children from Hong Kong.
- Alfred George Gannon Dickeson, Higher Executive Officer, Board of Trade.
- George Alexander Dodd, Divisional Director and Commercial Manager, Telephone Cables Division, British Insulated Callender's Cables Ltd. For services to Export.
- Percy Richard Dunlop, Assistant Schoolmaster, Star County Junior School, Newham.
- William David Earnshaw, Chairman, Earnshaw Ltd. For services to Export.
- Winifred Maud Ebsworth, Ward Sister, Goodmayes Hospital, Ilford, Essex.
- Henry George Echart, lately Honorary Secretary, London Borough of Lambeth Savings Committee.
- Harry Bruce Edge, Superintendent, Central Sterile Supply Department, United Leeds Hospitals.
- Evelyn Wynne Edwards. For services to agriculture in Hampshire.
- Trevor Hope Martin Edwards, Managing Director, Benjamin Edgington (Hire) Ltd.
- Keith Guy Eickhoff, Research Manager, Reactor Group, Risley, United Kingdom Atomic Energy Authority.
- Wallace Paterson Elliott, General Manager, Imperial Chemical Industries Ltd. (Oesterreich), Vienna. For services to Export.
- Amy Rosetta Francis Ellis, Honorary Secretary, London Borough of Bromley Savings Committee.
- Fred Evans, MM, Chairman, Preston and Southport Local Advisory Committee.
- Alderman James Evans, JP. For services to local government in Stoke-on-Trent.
- James Kenneth Evans, Area Training and Development Officer, Institute of Supervisory Management.
- Aldred George Evershed, JP, Secretary-Superintendent, Southern Railwaymen's Homes for Children and Old People.
- Arthur Pryce Fairhurst, Head of Remedial Department, Meols Cop County Secondary School for Boys, Southport.
- Margaret Mary Feeny, General Secretary, The Africa Centre.
- Elizabeth Scott Ferguson, Manageress, The Scottish Craft Centre.
- Clifford Albert Fisher, Clerical Officer, Board of Inland Revenue.
- Thomas James Fisher, Lately Clerk, Newbury Rural District Council.
- Norah Kathleen Fitzpatrick, Executive Officer, Civil Service Department.
- William Allen Follows, Group Secretary, North Staffordshire Hospital Management Committee.
- James Henry Forbes, Staff Officer, Ministry of Agriculture for Northern Ireland.
- Bernard Albert Ford. For services to Ice Dancing.
- Squadron Leader Stanley Joseph William Ford, Administrative Officer, Devon Wing Air Training Corps, Ministry of Defence.
- Leon Alfred John Gaillard, Staff Officer, Board of Inland Revenue.
- John Campbell Gallagher, Head of Relays and Links, Transmitter Planning and Installation Department, British Broadcasting Corporation.
- James Varcoe Geach, Member, Kerrier Rural District Council, Cornwall.
- Mabel Edith George, Managing Editor, Children's Books, Oxford University Press.
- Frederick William Gerrard, Commander, Metropolitan Police.
- James Gilchrist, Governor, West of Scotland Agricultural College.
- Anne Lee Glassey, Founder, Anne Glassey Workshop for Disabled Persons.
- Ruth Mary Goodall, Personal Assistant to the Chairman, British Overseas Airways Corporation.
- Geoffrey Frederic Goode, Technical Officer "A" (Civil), West Midland Divisional Road Engineers Office, Ministry of Transport.
- William Gordon, Headmaster, Clune Park Primary School, Port Glasgow.
- Frederick Guppy, JP, Chairman, Dorchester Rural District Council.
- Leslie George Halstead, Grade 4 Officer, Department of Employment and Productivity.
- William Handley. For services to Industrial Accident Prevention.
- Juliana Hanson, lately Supervisor, Hope School Junior Training Centre, Wigan.
- Thomas Shorrock Harris, Senior Executive Officer, HM Stationery Office.
- George Henry Harrison, Production Planning Manager, Vosper/Thorneycroft Group, Portsmouth. For services to Export.
- Sidney White Hart, ERD, Secretary, North Eastern Section, The Federation of Civil Engineering Contractors.
- Adrienne Harvey, British Travel Association Representative, Cape Town.
- Edward Charles Alexander Haviland, Chief Development Engineer, Marconi Instruments Ltd. For services to Export.
- Nellie Hawkins, lately Supervisor, Nursing and Midwifery, Durham County Council.
- Thomas Taylor Hayles, lately Assistant Honorary Secretary, Hull Boys' Club.
- Edward Leslie Alfred Hellicar, Inspector of Taxes (Higher Grade), Board of Inland Revenue.
- Percy Syme Henderson, MB, ChB, General Medical Practitioner, Galashiels.
- Edwin Hesketh, Honorary Secretary, Birmingham National Savings Schools Committee.
- Richard Naylor Hewitt, Chairman, North East Wholesale Fruit & Vegetable Market Ltd.
- Harold Hick, Councillor, Tadcaster Rural District Council.
- Ruby Clare Higgins, Higher Executive Officer, Ministry of Defence.
- William James Hinds, JP. For services to the milk producing industry.
- George Brew Hodgson, National Savings District Member, London Borough of Bexley.
- Mary Ursula Holdsworth, BEM, Assistant Regional Administrator for the Midlands, Women's Royal Voluntary Service.
- Harry Adams Holliday, Chairman, Holliday Group Ltd.
- Cyril Hopkins, Grade 3 Officer, Department of Employment and Productivity.
- Reginald William John Hubbard, Senior Executive Assistant, Solicitor's Department, London Transport Board.
- Major Walter Frederick Irvine, Treasurer, Northern Ireland Area, British Legion.
- Cyril Arthur Jennings, Senior Executive Officer, Department of Health and Social Security.
- Arthur Walpole Johns, Staff Manager, South Wales Docks, British Transport Docks Board.
- Thomas Emanuel Johnson, Chairman, Management Committee, King's Hall Youth Centre, Carlisle.
- Evan Thomas Glynne Jones, Chief Superintendent, Dyfed-Powys Constabulary.
- George Jones, Deputy Director, Textile Council Productivity Centre.
- Alderman Hugh Jones. For social and local government services in Holyhead.
- Muriel Helen Jones, District Nurse/ Midwife, Shropshire County Council.
- Ronald Thomas Jones, Permanent Secretary, Guild of Undergraduates, University of Birmingham.
- William John Jones, Senior Experimental Officer, Joint Anti-Submarine School, Londonderry, Ministry of Defence.
- Captain William Kay, Tug Master, Port of Liverpool.
- Oswald Bainbridge Kellett, Regional Wireless Engineer, Home Office.
- Patrick Joseph Kelly, Honorary Secretary, Royal Dublin Fusiliers Old Comrades Association.
- Jeffrey Kelson. Far services to the road transport industry.
- Robert Edgar Helme Kennedy, Proprietor, R. E. H. Kennedy. For services to Export.
- Frances Jane Kernaghan. For voluntary services to the community in Carrickfergus.
- Andrew Kerr, JP, Member, Ayr County Council.
- Alderman Kelsey Charles Kerridge, Member, Eastern Regional Joint Committee, Eastern Federation of Building Trades Employers.
- Barbara Mary Key, Secretary, Joint Secretariat for Specialist Associations, Royal College of Surgeons of England.
- Edith King, Headmistress, Teesside County Junior School, Eston.
- William Oliver Kirkwood, JP, Divisional Manager, Wear Division, Northern Gas Board.
- Harry Corteen Kneale, Chairman, Liverpool National Savings Schools Committee.
- Wing Commander Thomas Frederick Kyle, Technical Superintendent, Central Servicing Development Establishment, Royal Air Force, Swanton Morley.
- Charlotte Nancy Lall, Senior Executive Officer, General Post Office.
- Yvonne Gertrude Rosar-Lampard, Headmistress, Effra Infants School, London, S.W.2.
- John Frederick Langley, Senior Executive Officer, Board of Trade. Formerly Foreign and Commonwealth Office.
- Charles Laurie, Secretary, Royal National Mission to Deep Sea Fishermen.
- Enid Law (Mrs. Maynard), Head of Membership Department, British Film Institute.
- William Bruce Lawson, Engineer II, Ministry of Defence.
- Cyril Lea. For services to Venture House Youth Club, Melton Mowbray.
- Douglas Lee, Technical Officer, Electro-encephalography Department, Warneford and Park Hospitals, Oxford.
- Major Joseph Leniewski, Interpreter for Board of Trade.
- Thomas Lewis. For services to the community in Aberfan.
- Jeanie Walton Little, Senior Assistant, Occupational Centre, Wellpark.
- Alfred Edward Loving, Engineering Technical Class Grade I, Royal Aircraft Establishment, Farnborough, Ministry of Technology.
- Robert Lyall Lucas. For services to the United Kingdom Warning and Monitoring Organisation.
- Thomas James Lumsden, Chief Superintendent and Deputy Chief Constable, Angus Constabulary.
- Lucy Winifred Lunn, Foreign and Commonwealth Office.
- Edward Cecil Epworth Lyon, Electric Traction Engineer (London Area), Eastern Region, British Railways Board.
- John Robert Little McAndrews, Chairman, Northern Regional National Savings Education Committee.
- Patrick McCann, JP, Lately Provost of Kilsyth.
- Archibald Macdonald. For services to the Royal Air Force in Kinloss.
- John Boyd Macdonald, Grade 4 Officer, Department of Employment and Productivity.
- Captain James Mackinnon, Master, MV Ulster Prince, Coast Lines Ltd.
- James William Mackinnon, Training Assistant (Senior Executive Assistant), London Transport Board.
- Grace Ross McLean, Matron, Alexandra House, London Borough of Camden Home for the Elderly.
- Alexander MacLennan, MC, Lately Head Postmaster, Motherwell and Wishaw, General Post Office.
- John McLeod. For services to the community in Wick, Caithness.
- Francis McLoughlin (Reverend Brother Peter), Headmaster, St. Joseph's (Approved) School, Tranent, East Lothian.
- Angus Macpherson. For services to Piping.
- Craig Johnston Macpherson, BEM, Assistant Executive Engineer, General Post Office.
- Cyril Maurice McVay, Assistant Education Officer, Further Education Officer and Youth Service Officer, Guernsey.
- Robert Britton McWhirter, Member, East Sussex Agricultural Executive Committee.
- Henry James Mars. For services to the community in Treorchy.
- Frank Marsden, Secretary, Yorkshire (West Riding) County Branch, National Farmers' Union.
- William John Martin, Chairman, Swindon and District Local Employment Committee.
- Margaret Mary Martyr, Assistant Principal Probation Officer, Hertfordshire Probation and After-Care Service.
- Sydney John Mayall, Chief Officer, Herefordshire Fire Brigade.
- William Herbert Meech, Lately Clerical Officer, Ministry of Defence.
- Francis Aloysius Messenger, Radio Officer, Eastern Region, British Railways Board.
- Donald Vernon Michell, Assistant Traffic Manager (Controller of Sales and Marketing), Cable & Wireless
- Winifrede Sarah Jane Millington, Chairman, Ashton-under-Lyne, Hyde, Glossop and District War Pensions Committee.
- The Reverend Gordon Edward Moody, General Secretary, The Churches' Council on Gambling.
- Sheila Patricia Mossman (Mrs. Brown), Director of Music, Orpington Junior Singers.
- John Mudie, Chairman, Aberdeenshire Local Savings Committee.
- Commander Richard Gabbett-Mulhallen, Royal Navy (Retd.), Command Naval Auxiliary Officer, Ministry of Defence.
- William Edward Murphy. For services to youth in Northern Ireland.
- Norman Newton, JP, General Secretary, National Woolsorters Society.
- Albert William Nicholson, lately Assistant Secretary, Overseas Service Pensioners Association.
- Annie Laird Niven, Higher Executive Officer, Ministry of Housing and Local Government.
- Philip MacDonald Noble, Senior Illustrator, Exhibition Design and Display Unit, Royal Air Force, Hendon.
- Reginald Charles Oades, Head of Statistics Division, Chamber of Shipping of the United Kingdom.
- Blodwen Ivy Oriel, Lately Headmistress, Beechwood County Infant School, Woodley, Berkshire.
- Gwilym Owen, lately Labour Manager, Royal Ordnance Factory, Cardiff, Ministry of Technology.
- Leonard Frank Oxford, Technical Officer, Grade A, Department of Health and Social Security.
- Evelyn Mary Palethorpe, Lately Shipping Manager, P. P. Payne & Sons Ltd. For services to Export.
- Walter Parker, Technical Director, Ernest Scragg & Sons Ltd. For services to Export.
- Cyril Everard Parley, Chairman, Newark Disablement Advisory Committee.
- Stella Constance Parton, Senior Personal Secretary, Ministry of Power.
- Frank Partridge, Superintendent, Army Department Constabulary.
- James William Paterson, Surveyor, Shildon Urban District Council.
- Hugh Cecil Patterson, Establishment Officer, Belfast County Borough Council.
- Evelyn May Hester Pearce. For services to the community in Bromley.
- John Peck, ERD, Secretary, Slough and District Chamber of Commerce and Industry Incorporated. For services to Export.
- Ernest George Perry, Councillor, Chigwell Urban District Council.
- William Lawrence Perry, Superintendent, British Airports Authority Constabulary.
- Charles James Phillips, Chairman, Moira Rural District Council, County Down.
- John Laidler Pigg, JP, lately Councillor, Richmond Rural District Council, Yorkshire.
- Thomas James Steel Plenderleith, DSC, Provost of Kelso.
- Raymond Sidney Pollard, Manager, Sales Projects, G. W. Division, British Aircraft Corporation (Guided Weapons) Ltd, Stevenage. For services to Export.
- Ernest John Davidson Poole, lately Chief Cloth Consultant, Wool Industries Research Association. For services to Export.
- Valentine Thomas Henri Portwood, Assistant to Building Estate Surveyor, London Midland Region, British Railways.
- James Frederick Powell, President, Nottingham Trustee Savings Bank.
- Captain Peter Charles Priestley, Master, SS Malwa, Trident Tankers Ltd.
- John Wilfred Prince, Shipbuilding Project Manager, Cammell Laird & Company (Shipbuilders' & Engineers) Ltd.
- George Samuel Proffitt, Inspector of Taxes (Higher Grade), Board of Inland Revenue.
- Sydney Pulsford, Chairman, Wellington Rural District Council.
- James Purvis, Licensed Pilot and Senior Pilots' Representative, Tyne Pilotage Authority.
- Beryl Pygott, Administrative Officer, Basildon Development Corporation.
- John Harris Rea. For services to the community of Banbridge and District, County Down.
- Margaret Redmond. For services to agriculture and horticulture in Northern Ireland.
- Gordon Aubrey Reeves, JP, District Secretary, National Union of General and Municipal Workers.
- Thomas Reid, Surveyor, Board of Customs and Excise.
- George Reynolds, Chairman, Pontefract Local Savings Committee.
- Alfred John Stephens Rider, Senior Executive Officer, Board of Trade.
- Frederick Roberts, Chairman, North East Wales Local Advisory Committee.
- George Robertson, Senior Executive Officer, Ministry of Overseas Development.
- Frederick Robinson, Superintendent, Northern Police Convalescent Home.
- Ivor Lindow Robson, Lately Chairman, Carlisle Local Pharmaceutical Committee.
- Arthur Robert Roddick, Vice-Chairman, Board of Management, Glasgow Victoria and Leverndale Hospitals.
- Mabel Clare Roles, Honorary Organising Secretary, Salisbury Old People's Welfare Committee.
- Jean Rose, Matron, St. Mary's Hospital for Women and Children, Plaistow, London.
- Eric Rowden, Lately Head of The Fuel and Kiln Department, British Ceramic Research Association.
- Margaret Elizabeth Rowntree. For services to local government in Fleetwood.
- Thomas Russell Samson, Lately Area Safety Engineer, Scottish South Area, National Coal Board.
- Richard Kenneth Sayer, Honorary Secretary, Newhaven Branch, Royal National Lifeboat Institution.
- William Leonard Screen, Traffic Manager, Midland General Omnibus Company Ltd.
- Robert Cyril Sheldon, Group Chief Development Engineer, Joseph Lucas Ltd, For services to Export.
- Frederick Sydney Shepherd, attached Ministry of Defence.
- Harold Shepherdson, Trainer of England Association Football Team.
- Rosamond Connie Gunner Sherwood, Hostess, Beit Hall, Imperial College, University of London.
- May Ernestine Shutler, General Administrative Officer, South Western' Regional Hospital Board.
- Elizabeth Leitch Simpson, Night Superintendent, Glasgow Royal Infirmary.
- George Donald Simpson, Field Officer, Grade I, Department of Agriculture and Fisheries for Scotland.
- Ian MacLeod-Smith, Sales Director, Jones Cranes Ltd. For services to Export.
- James Smith, Sheep Farmer, Scalloway, Shetland. For the invention of a gutting machine for small fish.
- Lawrence George Smith, lately Senior Head Keeper, Zoological Society of London.
- William Alfred David Smith, DSM, Clerical Assistant, Ministry of Defence.
- George Archibald Snodgrass, TD, JP, DL, Chairman, Clean Air Council for Scotland.
- Irene Lilian Staniforth, Grade 5 Officer, Department of Employment and Productivity.
- Helen Barbara Steward, Branch Secretary, Oxfordshire Branch, British Red Cross Society.
- Leslie Stewart, JP. For services to the wholesale provisions and groceries trade in Northern Ireland.
- Sydney Stout, Former Member, Farnworth Borough Council.
- Alfred Stubbs, Head of Department of Business and General Studies, South Cheshire Central College of Further Education, Crewe.
- Ronald Swindall, Area Chief Accountant, South Nottinghamshire Area, National Coal Board.
- Mary Eileen Tattersall, Executive Officer, Department of Health and Social Security.
- Hubert Taylor, Senior Horticultural Adviser, Parks Department, Greater London Council.
- Mercy Taylor, Domiciliary Nurse/Midwife, Denbighshire County Council.
- Elizabeth Thom, Special Assistant Teacher, Clifton High School, Coatbridge.
- Evelyn Mary Thomas (Mrs. Paczosa), Printed Publicity Editor, British Broadcasting Corporation.
- James Edward Thomas, Managing Director, E. W. Thomson & Sons Ltd, Kendal. For services to Export.
- Mary Emma Thompson, Group Nursing Tutor, Sunderland Area Hospital Management Committee.
- William Thompson, Technical Sales Representative, General Electric Company/Associated Electrical Industries Ltd.
- Sheila Thomson, lately Chief Woman Officer, Government Car Service, Ministry of Public Building and Works.
- Violet Annie Florence Timewell, Divisional Secretary, Sheffield Division, Forces Help Society and Lord Roberts Workshops.
- Henry George Todd, First Class Superintendent of Stamping, Board of Inland Revenue.
- John Russell Toogood, Prison Visitor, HM Prison Parkhurst.
- Diane Margaret Towler. For services to Ice Dancing.
- Alderman Joseph Tweedale, Honorary Secretary, Rochdale Local Savings Committee.
- Thomas Vaile, Higher Executive Officer, Department of Health and Social Security.
- Glyn Vaughan, Chairman, No. 1340 (Rhyl) Squadron Committee, Air Training Corps.
- Arthur Dennis Viggers, Insurance Manager, British Overseas Airways Corporation.
- Anthony Henry Vine, Senior Executive Officer, Export Credits Guarantee Department, Formerly Director, British Week Office, in Stockholm.
- Edgar Norman Walsh, Chief Assistant (Administration), County Surveyors Department, Lancashire County Council.
- John Henry Warren, lately Higher Executive Officer, Ministry of Technology.
- William George Warren, Chairman, Stoke Park League of Hospital Friends.
- John Francis Warwick, Manager, Fitting-Experimental Manufacturing, Aero Engine Division, Rolls-Royce Ltd.
- Cyril Rigby Wason, Grade 4 Officer, National Board for Prices and Incomes.
- James Thomas Watkins, Higher Executive Officer, Ministry of Defence.
- Lily Maud Constance Watkins, Higher Executive Officer, Ministry of Agriculture, Fisheries and Food.
- Tudur Watkins. For services to the Arts in Wales.
- Abram Rackley Watson. For services to local Government and to the community in Glamorgan.
- James Henry Wealleans, JP, Councillor, Newbiggin Urban District Council.
- Albert Norman Webster, Grade 3 Officer, Department of Employment and Productivity.
- Lawson Wharton, Alderman, Colne Borough Council.
- Betty Elsie Wheate, Foreign and Commonwealth Office.
- Manning Hedges Whiley, Honorary Secretary, Hastings Fishermen's Society and Institute.
- Arthur Richard George White, Deputy Chief Constable, Somerset and Bath Constabulary.
- Raymond Eric White, Marketing Director, Clover Leaf (Products) Ltd, Swindon. For services to Export.
- Herbert Hugh Whitley, Member, Southern District Committee, Devon Agricultural Executive Committee.
- Thomas Hugh Wildy, Area Superintendent, East Africa Area, Commonwealth War Graves Commission.
- John Elwyn Williams, Chairman, Rhondda Local Savings Committee.
- Gwendolen Wilson, JP, lately Member, Tottenham Hospital Management Committee.
- Thomas Arnold Wolstenholme, Training Manager, Brough Division, Hawker Siddeley Aviation Ltd.
- Horace George Woods, lately Chief Superintendent, Bedfordshire and Luton Constabulary.
- Thomas Kennedy Woods, Chairman, Kilrea Local Savings Committee, County Londonderry.
- Frank Wootton, Chairman, J. & F. Wootton Ltd, Walsall.
- Dorothy Mary Wright, lately Personal Assistant to Chairman, Midlands Electricity Board.
- Mary Frances Wright. For services to overseas students.
- Thomas Enoch Brinley Wrighton, Technical Assistant to Maintenance Manager, British European Airways.

Diplomatic Service and Overseas List

- Barbara Ellen Algie, Clerical Officer, British High Commission, Auckland, New Zealand.
- Ignatius Antoine, JP, Head Teacher, Micoud Primary School, Saint Lucia.
- Marguerite Florence Louise Barley, lately Nursing Sister, Church Missionary Society Leprosy Settlement, Kabale, Uganda.
- Gloria Barretto, Personal Secretary to District Officer, Tai Po, New Territories, Hong Kong.
- Maximus Joseph Bay, lately Deputy Director of Education, Fiji.
- Silvia Bell, Clerical Officer, British High Commission, Auckland, New Zealand.
- William Leopold Bellotti, Clerk, British Vice-Consulate, Algeciras, Spain.
- John Du Sautoy Blennerhassett, British Consul, Colon, Panama.
- Sidney James Bowe, Technical Assistance Adviser/Instructor in Iran.
- Hilda Victoria Bowen, Principal Matron, Ministry of Health, Bahama Islands.
- Kenneth Forbes Brown. For services to British interests in Kuching, Malaysia.
- Patrick Bernard Cadney, Technical Assistance Adviser in Nepal.
- Frank Michael Kinson Caldwell, Chief Engineer (Roads & Transport), Ministry of Works, Lesotho.
- Winifred Calmels, lately Second Secretary, British High Commission, Port of Spain.
- Mary Cashmore, Shorthand Typist, Her Majesty's Consulate-General, Geneva, Switzerland.
- Winifred Mary Chadwtck. For services to the community in Fiji.
- Chan Sik-tim, Senior Assistant Master, Education Department, Hong Kong.
- Michael Brendan Collins, Her Majesty's Consul, Prague.
- Edward Crawford, Headmaster, Technical Institute, Bermuda.
- Faroak Abdul Curreem, Executive Officer Class I, Public Works Department, Hong Kong.
- Helen Daniel, lately British Pro-Consul, Her Majesty's Consulate, Kobe, Japan.
- Fred Joseph Dare. For public services in Saint Vincent.
- Maravillas Irene Davenhill, British Pro-Consul, British Vice-Consulate, Granada, Spain.
- Audrey Kaye Davies, London Representative of the Ahmadu Bello University, Zaria, Northern Nigeria.
- Leonora Winifred Dearlove, Clerical Officer, United Kingdom Mission to the United Nations, New York.
- Geoffrey Wallis Dearsley. For services in the field of education in Northern Nigeria.
- Ronald Thomas Dew, British Colombo Plan Adviser to the Nepal Electricity Corporation.
- Derek Edmondson. For services to British interests in Malaysia.
- Thomas Norman Joseph Edwards, Chief Superintendent of Police, Nigeria.
- Maude Josephine Etienne, Assistant Matron, Victoria Hospital, Saint Lucia.
- Ethel Fairweather. For services to the community in British Honduras.
- John Matcham Foulsham, Lands Officer, Electricity Corporation of Nigeria.
- Mary Johnson Galarce, Matron, British and American Benevolent Society Old Ladies Home, Buenos Aires.
- Thomas Desmond Gilfedder, Manager, N.A.A.F.I. Shop, Nairobi.
- Maurice Gotfried, Assistant Commissioner, Royal Hong Kong Auxiliary Police Force.
- Ho Chuen-yiu. For services to the community in Hong Kong.
- Reginald Horner, lately Chief Consultant Architect, Ahmadu Bello University, Zaria, Northern Nigeria.
- Alma Hunt. For services to sport in Bermuda.
- Wilson Inia, Principal, Malhaha School, Rotuma, Crown Colony, Fiji.
- Robert Hay Jackson, Executive Engineer, Public Works Department, Sabah, Malaysia.
- Felix Firmin Jacquier, Accountant, Her Majesty's Embassy, Beirut.
- Robert George Jenkins, Clerk, Her Majesty's Embassy, Paris.
- Isobel Mary Johnston, Matron, Scottish Livingstone Hospital, Molepolole, Botswana.
- John Colville Kelly, Manager, British Bank of the Middle East, Dubai.
- Harry Lester, lately British Vice-Consul, Her Majesty's Embassy, Budapest.
- Leung Chiu-man, Deputy Registrar, Victoria District Court, Hong Kong.
- Eunice Lindon, Shorthand Typist, British High Commission, Zomba.
- Pamela Mary Loney, Matron, Zomba General Hospital, Malawi.
- David White Mack, General Manager, National Bank of Dubai.
- Dennis Trevor Llewellyn Marr, Honorary Vice-Consul, Maracaibo, Venezuela.
- Ernest David James Martin, lately Transport Manager, Hong Kong.
- Jennifer Mary Mayo. For nursing and welfare services in Senegal.
- Ronald Ralph Mellor, Second Secretary, British High Commission, Zomba.
- Isabel Winifred Monteith. For welfare services to the British community in Paris.
- Helen Mary Moore, Vice-Principal, The English School, Nicosia.
- Thomas Henry Moran, Her Majesty's Consul, Helsinki.
- Percival Rainbow Mully, Transport Manager, Her Majesty's Embassy, Athens.
- Lois Mary Murphy, Assistant to Vice-Consul, Her Majesty's Consulate-General, New Orleans, United States of America.
- George Needham, Her Majesty's Consul, Munich, Germany.
- Jeanne Mary Noble, lately Head Nurse, British Medical Team, Saigon.
- Louis Francis O'Garra, lately Headmaster, Bishop Fitzgerald School, Gibraltar.
- Michael John Palmer. For services to British interests in Sweden.
- Henry Dennis Ross Patterson, Secretary, British Trade Centre, Caracas.
- Herbert Peach, BEM, Clerical Officer, Her Majesty's Embassy, Tehran.
- France Stanley Pereira, Government Representative, Praslin, Seychelles.
- Eric Pickard, Agricultural Superintendent (Mechanical), North-Eastern State, Nigeria.
- Charles Emmanuel Pontine Piper. For services to education in Montserrat.
- Ladike Wilhem Price, Reception Clerk/Telephonist, Her Majesty's Embassy, Lisbon.
- Robert William Primrose, JP, Clerk of Councils, Hong Kong.
- Lucila Ramagge, lately Confidential Stenographer to the Permanent Secretary, Gibraltar.
- Ramlakhan. For services to the community in Fiji.
- Francis James Gordon Rigby, Organiser of Training and Farm Settlement Scheme for the Blind, Tanzania.
- Roy Summerton Roberts, Her Majesty's Consul, Hamburg, Germany.
- Charles Boon Chuey Scott. For services to British interests in Thailand.
- Ivy Rebecca Seymour, Secretary, Her Majesty's Embassy, Caracas.
- Alexander Ogilvie Shirley, Accountant General, British Virgin Islands.
- Gwynneth Wollace Henchman Southworth, Executive Secretary, Washington Branch of the English-Speaking Union, United States of America.
- Reginald Douglas Stephenson. For services to British interests in Moulmein, Burma.
- Hilda Louisa Stevens, Head Teacher, Pilling Senior School, Saint Helena.
- Terence George Streeton, First Secretary, Her Majesty's Embassy, Bonn.
- Rosemary Stubbs. For services to the British Community in the area of Cannes, France.
- Neville Sylvester, lately Head Teacher, St. Mark's Roman Catholic School, St. Mark's, Grenada.
- William James Chisholm Symon, lately District Agricultural Officer, Masai, Kenya.
- Carrie Joyce Tasch, First Secretary, United Kingdom Mission, United Nations, Geneva, Switzerland.
- Rupeni Saqaleka Tawake, Works Foreman, Public Works Department, British Solomon Islands Protectorate.
- Lewis Vincent Taylor, Superintendent, Boys' Industrial School, Bahama Islands.
- Randolph Marcus Thomas, Superintendent, Royal Saint Vincent Police Force.
- Philip Alfred Thorogood, Honorary Vice-Consul, Valencia, Venezuela.
- Reginald Usher. For services in the field of education in Cameroon.
- Major Henry James Dominic Utley, MVO, Attache, Her Majesty's Legation to the Holy See.
- Aarie Van Aalst, Technical Assistance Adviser in Iran.
- Martin Walsh, Chief Superintendent of Police, Nigeria.
- Captain Ernest Victor Ward, Marine Officer, Gilbert and Ellice Islands Colony.
- Eric Anthony Warren. For services with British relief teams in Nigeria.
- Richard George Williams, Acting Lagos Agent of Elder Dempster Agents Limited.
- John Derek Wilson, lately Chief Superintendent of Police, Nigeria.
- Vera May Wisinger, Nursing Superintendent and Welfare Officer, British Red Cross, Antigua.
- Patricia Mary Wright, Typist, Her Majesty's Embassy, Prague.

State of New South Wales

- Norman Edwin Anderton. For services to the welfare of mentally handicapped children.
- Edith Roseby Ball. For services to education.
- Marie Lorna Duncan. For services to ex-servicemen.
- Jean Johnstone Gale. For services to the community, particularly with the Red Cross Society.
- Devaney William High. For services to the community.
- Phyllis Inez Jessep. For services to nursing.
- Elizabeth Annie Kellett. For services to the community.
- Patrick Joseph Sylvester Mooney. For services to the community.
- Rex Henry Morgan. For services to education.
- Allan Joseph Prescott. For services to the community.
- William James Stagg. For services to the Returned Services League.
- Vincent Joseph Williams. For services to the community, particularly to ex-servicemen and crippled children.

State of Victoria

- Geoffrey Coker Arding Adams. For services to newspaper publishing.
- William Charles Brady, of Nunawading. For services to the rehabilitation of former prisoners.
- Frank Rupert Bowden Coghill, JP, of Boort. For services to local government and to the community.
- Estelle Marie Elethea Collmann, of Hawthorn. For services to the community, particularly to women and children.
- George Walter Findlay, of Glen Iris. For services to music and to the welfare of the blind.
- William George Hide, of Caulfield. For services to ex-servicemen.
- Councillor Roy Thornton Hill, of Molyullah. For services to local government.
- Councillor Herbert George Hilton, of Hopetoun. For services to local government and to the community.
- Councillor Alan Worrall Jones, of Kanumbra. For services to local government.
- Councillor Francis Cyril McCartney, of Echuca. For services to local government.
- Councillor Robert Edward McIndoe, of Leongatha. For services to local government and to the community.
- Catherine McLennan, of Brim. For voluntary nursing services.

State of Queensland

- Daisy Winifred Hinschen, of Proserpine. For services to the community.
- Thomas Joseph Jackman, of Sandgate. For services to the meat industry.
- Edna Mabel Park, of Indooroopilly. For services to the welfare of ex-Naval men and women.
- Rita Bertha Pointon, Matron, Normanton District Hospital.
- Robert James Simmonds, of Miles. For services to local government and to the community.
- Alec James Symonds, of Indooroopilly. For services to youth welfare.

State of South Australia

- Alfred Hamilton Bradley, JP, of Kybybolite. For services to local government and to the community.
- Edward Lewis Gare, of Millswood. For services to music.
- John Arno Halbert, of Clapham. For services to the community, particularly to young people.
- Dorothy Stagg, of Port Lincoln. For services to the community.

State of Western Australia

- Olive Eva Anstey. For services to nursing.
- Edith May Miller. For services to the community, particularly to the Royal Flying Doctor Service.
- Augustus Milton Pickett. For services to the community, particularly to the Returned Services League.

State of Tasmania

- Roy Reginald Bradshaw. For services to the Returned Services League.
- Alice Hyslop Crosswell. For services to the community.

=== Order of the Companions of Honour (CH) ===
- Sir John (Giovanni Battista) Barbirolli. For services to music.
- Sir Allen Lane Williams Lane, Chairman, Penguin Publishing Company.
- The Right Honourable Dr. Eric Williams, Prime Minister and Minister of Finance, Planning and Development, Trinidad and Tobago.

=== Companion of the Imperial Service Order (ISO) ===
Home Civil Service

- Maurice William Andrews, Head Postmaster, Nottingham, General Post Office.
- Leonard Edward Armstrong, Chief Executive Officer, Board of Inland Revenue.
- Alistair Angus John Bain, lately Principal Scientific Officer, Ministry of Technology.
- John Kernan Bannon, Senior Principal Scientific Officer, Meteorological Office, Ministry of Defence.
- Henry William Durrant, Chief Executive Officer, Ministry of Agriculture, Fisheries and Food.
- William Robertson Dickson Greenan, Senior Chief Executive Officer, Department of Health and Social Security.
- Percy Albert Hibberd, Principal Scientific Officer, Royal Radar Establishment, Malvern, Ministry of Technology.
- Edward Eustace Hill, Principal Collector, Board of Inland Revenue.
- Kenneth Hunter, Senior Inspector, Board of Inland Revenue.
- Winton Thomas Johnson, Superintending Electrical Engineer, Ministry of Defence.
- George Robert Kemp, Chief Executive Officer, Department of Health and Social Security.
- Frederick Julius Kumpf, Deputy Controller, Valuation Branch, Board of Customs and Excise.
- Michael Latin, Senior Mechanical and Electrical Engineer, Ministry of Public Building and Works.
- Andrew Baird McLanachan, Chief Executive Officer, Scottish Home and Health Department.
- David Malcolm, Senior Principal Scientific Officer, Ministry of Defence.
- Alfred Charles Morgan, First Class Valuer, Board of Inland Revenue.
- Anthony Leo Mullen, MRCVS, Divisional Veterinary Officer, Ministry of Agriculture, Fisheries and Food.
- David Pilkington, Senior Chief Executive Officer, Department of Health and Social Security.
- Joseph Horsfield Rigby, Lately Senior Engineer, Ministry of Public Building and Works.
- Harold Winson, Principal Executive Officer, Home Office.
- Clarence Wrighton, Senior Chief Executive Officer, Ministry of Defence.

Diplomatic Service and Overseas List

- Roland Spencer Byron, Government Secretary, Nevis.
- Hubert Forrester Knowles, MBE, lately Permanent Secretary, Ministry of Internal Affairs, Bahama Islands.
- Lilburn Alexander Kenneth Lawrence, Postmaster-General, Saint Lucia.
- Louis Charles Saccone, Law Clerk, Attorney-General's Chambers, Gibraltar.

State of Queensland

- Ian Webster Morley, State Mining Engineer and Chief Inspector of Mines.

State of South Australia

- Reginald Keith Sowden, JP, Registrar of Companies Industrial and Provident Societies.

State of Tasmania

- Douglas Edwin Wilkinson, Government Printer.

=== British Empire Medal (BEM) ===
Military Division

Royal Navy

- Chief Petty Officer (PRI) Edgar Francis Aylette, P/JX 851135, on loan to the Royal Malaysian Navy.
- Ordnance Electrical Artificer (O) First Class Stanley Harry Brooks Banks, P/MX 60146.
- Chief Engine Room Artificer John Henry James Berry, D/MX 778197.
- Chief Radio Supervisor Dennis Joseph Bignell, P/JX 885107.
- Chief Petty Officer (BTI) John James Bruce, D/JX 860014.
- Chief Engine Room Artificer Arthur William Burton, P/MX 842602.
- Chief Petty Officer Sing Chu, O.1252.
- Chief Petty Officer Anthony Cilia, E/JX 637846.
- Chief Radio Electrical Mechanician (Air) Jeffrey Crofts, L/FX 833820.
- Chief Petty Officer (PRI) Richard Morgan Dixon, P/JX 394458.
- Chief Air Fitter (AE) Gordon Peter George, L/FX 101689.
- Chief Ordnance Electrical Artificer (L) Stanley Gerrard, P/MX 75592.
- Chief Petty Officer (GI) Edward Gosden, P/JX 194779.
- Ordnance Electrical Artificer (O) First Class Wallace Harris, D/MX 55736.
- Chief Wren Writer (Pay) Elizabeth Mary Howard, 78156, Women's Royal Naval Service.
- Colour Sergeant Martin Francis Joyce, Ply/X5562, Royal Marines.
- Chief Petty Officer Cook Ronald John Matten, S/MX 832945.
- Chief Joiner John James McNaughton, Q 991935, Royal Naval Reserve.
- Chief Ordnance Electrical Mechanician (L) Francis Noon, P/MX 873480.
- Chief Engineering Mechanic Eric Norman Oatley, D/KX 92527.
- Quartermaster Sergeant Walter Preston, Rm 9652, Royal Marines.
- Master-at-Arms Henry Thomas Butler Savage, P/MX 759539.
- Acting Chief Control Electrical Artificer George Skinner, P/MX 804964.
- Chief Petty Officer Writer Derek Taylor, P/MX 841246.
- Colour Sergeant Robert Thompson, Ch/X 4597, Royal Marines.
- Chief Petty Officer Writer Brian Eric Tredray, P/MX 771908.
- Chief Engine Room Artificer Peter George Edward Tuck, P/MX 904929.
- Aircraft Artificer First Class John Anthony Weeks, L/FX 670209.
- Chief Aircraft Artificer (A/E) Bryan George Woodward, L/FX 669463.

Army

- 3784301 Staff Sergeant Reginald Dennis Beith, The King's Regiment (Manchester and Liverpool).
- 22448442 Warrant Officer Class II John Edward Biggs, Royal Army Medical Corps.
- 22916209 Staff Sergeant Eric Astill Burton, Royal Corps of Signals, Territorial and Army Volunteer Reserve.
- 22221075 Sergeant (Local) Malcolm Joseph Leonard Collins, Royal Corps of Transport.
- 14134306 Staff Sergeant Glyn Duke, The South Wales Borderers.
- 22807738 Sergeant George Vernon French, The Royal Green Jackets.
- 23864926 Staff Sergeant John Edward Goodall, Intelligence Corps.
- 22242215 Sergeant Dennis Thomas Harris, Royal Corps of Signals, Territorial and Army Volunteer Reserve.
- 23479934 Staff Sergeant David Keers Harvey, Royal Corps of Signals.
- 23729441 Sergeant David Terrence Haugh, Royal Army Ordnance Corps.
- 23877923 Sergeant Thomas Cranston Hughes, Royal Army Pay Corps.
- 22293444 Warrant Officer Class II (acting) Ronald Jarmain, Army Catering Corps.
- 23424746 Sergeant Jeffrey Law, Royal Army Pay Corps.
- 23062241 Staff Sergeant Claude Hill Lilley, Royal Army Ordnance Corps.
- 24039169 Sergeant Gerald Ernest Frederick Lisle, Corps of Royal Electrical and Mechanical Engineers.
- 22224008 Sergeant John McCrudden, Royal Army Medical Corps, Territorial and Army Volunteer Reserve.
- 22237687 Sergeant Sidney Joseph Merchant, Corps of Royal Electrical and Mechanical Engineers, Territorial and Army Volunteer Reserve.
- 22246578 Sergeant (acting) Eric Albert Middlewood, The Parachute Regiment.
- 15002422 Sergeant Wynne Arthur Popkiss, The Royal Highland Fusiliers (Princess Margaret's Own Glasgow and Ayrshire Regiment).
- 21147804 Staff Sergeant Phurba Lama, Gurkha Engineers.
- 23515362 Staff Sergeant Arthur Harold Richer, The Parachute Regiment.
- 22309189 Sergeant Ian Roderick Rumble, Corps of Royal Electrical and Mechanical Engineers.
- 22518733 Warrant Officer Class II (acting) Henry Francis Salmon, Royal Regiment of Artillery.
- 23253042 Staff Sergeant George Hendry Shaw, Corps of Royal Engineers.
- 23133970 Staff Sergeant Lawrence George Henry Storey, Royal Corps of Signals.
- 19044371 Warrant Officer Class II (acting) Douglas Frank Earle Williams, Special Air Service Regiment, now retired.
- 22478343 Staff Sergeant Andrew Johnston Wright, 3rd (Territorial) Battalion, Queen's Own Highlanders (Seaforth and Cameron). Territorial and Army Volunteer Reserve, now retired.

Overseas Award

- Warrant Officer Class II Theodore Theophilus Bramble, Montserrat Defence Force.

Royal Air Force

- Acting Warrant Officer Francis Brady (Y4006786).
- P0574804 Flight Sergeant Frederick Gentry Austin.
- V3092857 Flight Sergeant Michael Rohan Curtis, for services with the Royal Malaysian Air Force.
- A4004607 Flight Sergeant Keith Ian Dobie.
- H4084328 Flight Sergeant Richard Grainger Drake.
- M0620030 Flight Sergeant James Harold Flattery.
- V0592514 Flight Sergeant John Colin Fox.
- P0975120 Flight Sergeant Alfred Ivan Hall, for services with the Royal Malaysian Air Force.
- K0643909 Flight Sergeant Stanley Roy Hoskins.
- W5042923 Flight Sergeant John Kenneth George Maxwell Hughes.
- G4034770 Flight Sergeant Jeffrey Reginald Andrew Joy.
- C0629548 Flight Sergeant Douglas Edmund Manchip.
- Q4038665 Flight Sergeant Lawrence Merton Mann.
- F3515891 Flight Sergeant Trevor John Palmer, RAF Regiment.
- L3501959 Flight Sergeant Brian Pounds.
- G4010837 Flight Sergeant Alfred John Readman.
- B4025168 Flight Sergeant Kenneth Edward Tomkins, for services with the Kenya Air Force.
- N4106488 Acting Flight Sergeant James Roy Hewitson.
- B4137242 Acting Flight Sergeant Gordon Frederick Lang.
- E3502825 Chief Technician John Edward George Fallen, for services with the British Joint Services Training Team, Ghana.
- E0649329 Chief Technician William Franklin.
- H0553110 Chief Technician Thomas Charles Jones, for services in the Pitcairn Islands.
- E0625349 Chief Technician Horace Edmund Mann.
- K1862425 Chief Technician Richard Edward Moody.
- L1921813 Chief Technician Cyril Alexander Morrison Murray.
- D1922438 Chief Technician Robert Donald Parker.
- N1922525 Chief Technician Brian Pirrie.
- V3503581 Chief Technician Clifford Richards.
- U1922217 Chief Technician Francis Rodney Joseph Tape.
- U4013611 Chief Technician Roy Edward Venus.
- S0632292 Chief Technician Harry Woodcock.
- C4143960 Sergeant Magnus Bethune.
- Q2599195 Sergeant Frederick William Cawte.
- 2659165 Sergeant Elizabeth McKenna Harper, Women's Royal Auxiliary Air Force.
- W4153265 Sergeant John Hemming.
- E4193867 Sergeant David Brian Hulbert.
- E0592475 Sergeant John Howard Matthews.
- C3519285 Sergeant David John Mummery.
- N2325032 Corporal George Geoffrey Mortimer, for services with the Kenya Air Force.
- U4180371 Corporal Gordon Edward Richard Wannell.
- P3084106 Corporal Eric George Wooldridge.
- Y1941243 Acting Corporal Thomas Arthur Poultney, for services with the British Joint Services Training Team, Zambia.

Civil Division

United Kingdom

- Gerald Atkinson, Bugler, Hillsborough Guard. For services in the promotion of trade.
- Thomas Barker, Postal and Telegraph Officer, Head Post Office, Blackpool.
- Frank Sidney Barnes, Distribution Emergency Man, Southern Gas Board.
- Gordon Edward Arthur George Barnett, Senior Scientific Assistant, Radio and Space Research Station, Slough.
- Jack Barnsley, Craftsman, Rippon & Dean Ltd, Sheffield.
- Marian Bassett, Chief Naval Auxiliaryman, Royal Naval Auxiliary Service, Plymouth Command.
- Ernest Batchelor, Driver/Attendant, London Ambulance Service.
- George William Bates, Railway Yard Master, Ministry of Defence.
- Dorothy Maude Baxter, Honorary Collector, Village Savings Group, Minster, Kent.
- James Beardmore, Colliery Mechanical Engineer, Silverdale Colliery, Staffordshire Area, National Coal Board.
- Alfred Henry Beards, Technical Supervisor, HM Dockyard, Devonport.
- Ernest Beevers, Canal Length Foreman, Sheffield Section, Castleford Area, British Waterways Board.
- Amy Bird. For services to All Saints Hospital, Southwark.
- Ernest Percy Blake, Tailor, Royal Marines, Deal, Kent.
- William Bertram Blunkell, Toolmaker, C.A.V. Ltd, Acton.
- Thomas Bontoft, Road Transport Safety Supervisor, Continental Oil (U.K.) Ltd.
- George Bow, Foreman, Carpenters Shop, Building Department, British Broadcasting Corporation.
- Charles Harry Bramble, Lately Storehouseman, Ministry of Public Building and Works, Gibraltar.
- Maud Agneta Brinkley, Officer-in-Charge of Storage and Issue of Medical Loan Stores, St. Asaph Detachment, Flintshire Branch, British Red Cross Society.
- Leonard William Brooker, Technical Supervisor (Shipwright Drillers), HM Dockyard, Chatham.
- Wilfred Broughton, Dust Suppression Officer, Bolsover Colliery, North Derbyshire Area, National Coal Board.
- Archie Harry Bryant, Supervisor, Erection Team, George W. King Ltd, Stevenage, Herts. For services to Export.
- Leonard Budd, Road Foreman, Hampshire County Council.
- George Ernest Budge, Works Fireman, Products Works, Beckton, North Thames Gas Board.
- Annie Sterry Burcher, Auxiliary Postwoman, Newnham, Gloucester.
- Ruth Butler, Canteen Supervisor, Springfields Works, United Kingdom Atomic Energy Authority.
- Ena Margaret Button, Precision Measurement Inspector, Hoffmann Manufacturing Company Ltd, Chelmsford.
- Mary Cairns, Foster Mother, Newtongrange, Midlothian.
- Francis Askew Calder, Technical Class Grade II, Royal Naval Aircraft Yard, Fleetlands, Gosport.
- Evelyn Arthur George Cant, Lately Sergeant, Essex County Constabulary.
- George Andrew Haig Clark, Station Officer, Portsmouth Fire Brigade.
- Stanley Clark, Pests Operator, North Riding of Yorkshire, Ministry of Agriculture, Fisheries and Food.
- William Dennis Clarke, Chargehand, Remploy Factory, Mansfield.
- Henry George Coleman, Bus Driver, London Transport Board.
- Ernest James Collins, Foreman, Contracting Section, London Electricity Board.
- Gladys Irene Cook, Chief Naval Auxiliaryman, Royal Naval Auxiliary Service.
- George Cooke, Warrant Officer, No. 384 (Mansfield) Squadron, Air Training Corps.
- James Cornwall, JP, Permanent Way Inspector, Grangemouth Docks, Forth Ports Authority.
- Ernest Arthur Course, Craftsman I Radio Fitter, Aeroplane and Armament Experimental Establishment, Boscombe Down.
- Elsie Gladys Cullingford, County Clothing Organiser, Norfolk, Women's Royal Voluntary Service.
- Thomas Darling, Shop Manager, Navy, Army and Air Force Institutes, Dortmund, Germany.
- Sylvance Dash, Joiner, Vosper Ltd, Paulsgrove, Portsmouth.
- Daphne Marguerite Davenport, Deputy County Organiser, Shropshire, Women's Royal Voluntary Service.
- Edwin Davies, Station Officer (Part-time), Breconshire and Radnorshire Fire Brigade.
- Harry Davis, Technical Engineering Grade III, Military Engineering Experimental Establishment, Christchurch, Hampshire.
- Frank Dawson, Head Foreman, Nu-Swift International Ltd, Elland, Yorkshire.
- Edward George Deacon, Driver 1, Plymouth Terminal, Shell-Mex and BP Ltd.
- John Denyer, Gate-keeper and farm labourer, East Malling Research Station, Kent.
- David Dickson, Chief Instructor, Department of Employment and Productivity.
- John Kidd Dickson, Process and General Supervisory Grade IV, Instrumentation Research Section, Rocket Propulsion Establishment, Westcott.
- James Dobson, Chief Inspector, Northumberland Constabulary.
- Joseph William Dodd, Sub-Officer (Part-time), Northumberland Fire Brigade.
- Frances Emma Doree, District Organiser, Haringey, Women's Royal Voluntary Service.
- John Carmichael Dunning, Technician Class 1, Glasgow Central, Scottish Region, British Railways Board.
- William Alfred Edwards, Chief Orchestral Porter, Music Division, British Broadcasting Corporation.
- Walter Elliott, Member, Glencoe Mountain Rescue Team.
- Cyril Frederick Ellis, Technical Grade III, Home Office.
- Horace Evans, Head Biscuit Placer, Josiah Wedgwood & Sons Ltd.
- Ian Lloyd Evans, Driver (Engine), Western Region, British Railways Board.
- Richard Matthew Evans, Coxswain, Moelfre Lifeboat, Royal National Lifeboat Institution.
- John Anthony Flanagan, Quantity Surveying Assistant III, Ministry of Public Building and Works.
- Alfred Footitt, Service Supervisor, Newark, East Midlands Gas Board.
- Joseph Wilfred Forster, Shift Leader/ Driver/Attendant, West Riding County Ambulance Service.
- Leslie Harold Gillard, Group Collector, Westland Aircraft Ltd.
- Rowland Goldman, Quartermaster, SS Makrana, Cunard-Brocklebank Ltd.
- James Goodwin, Millwright, Sanderson Brothers & Newbould Ltd.
- Samuel Goodwin, Weaving Superintendent, Blackwood, Morton & Sons Ltd, Kilmarnock.
- Frank Thomas Gordon, Foreman, Air Weapons Assembly, Hawker Siddeley Dynamics Ltd.
- Robert James Gracey, Stores Superintendent, No. 14 Maintenance Unit, RAF Carlisle.
- John Lyall Gray, Warrant Officer, No. 1285 (Caithness) Squadron, Air Training Corps.
- John Grieve, Driver/Attendant, Cumberland County Ambulance Service.
- Stanley George Charles Hardy, Technical Officer, Victoria Telephone Exchange.
- Ethel Patricia Harper, Air Traffic Control Assistant, Grade I, Preston Air Traffic Control Centre, Board of Trade.
- Arthur Frederick Harris, Transport Workshop Supervisor (Technical Officer Grade II), Metropolitan Police Civil Staff.
- Ernest John Thomas Harris, Sergeant, Devon and Cornwall Constabulary.
- Ethel Harris, First Aid Attendant, Ministry of Defence.
- William Austin Harrison, Instructional Officer, Grade III, Department of Employment and Productivity.
- Joseph Hart, Surface Foreman, Wath Main Colliery, South Yorkshire Area, National Coal Board.
- Herbert Patrick Hayward, Chargehand Craftsman I, Royal Aircraft Establishment, Farnborough.
- Gertrude Healey, Sub-Postmistress, Keyham Sub Office, Leicester.
- Thomas William Hicks, Highways Superintendent, City Engineer's Department, Bath County Borough.
- Albert Edward Higham, Chief Inspector, Monks Hall Works (Warrington), British Steel Corporation.
- Robert Percival Horner, Carpenter, RAF Catterick.
- Wilfred Howarth, Head Chancery Guard, British Embassy, Cape Town.
- Elsie Huckbody, Centre Organiser, Rotherham Rural District, Women's Royal Voluntary Service.
- Frederick Huse, Stackyard Foreman, Concrete Ltd, Hounslow, Middlesex.
- Sarah Ann Inskip, Forewoman Cleaner, Metropolitan Police Civil Staff.
- Stephen Anderson Irvine, Foreman (Grade 1), North Eastern Electricity Board.
- Harold Jackson, Iron Ore Miner, Beckermet Ore Mines, Workington, British Steel Corporation.
- Vinnie Marshall Jackson, Honorary Collector, Street Savings Group, Mansfield Woodhouse.
- Clifford Jenkins, Sample Passer, Ebbw Vale Works, British Steel Corporation.
- Frank Johnson, Underground Worker, Desford Colliery, South Midlands Area, National Coal Board.
- Bessie Ann Jones, Honorary Collector, Street Savings Group, Trelawnyd, Flintshire.
- Morgan Emrys Jones, Senior Technical Assistant, Ministry of Agriculture, Fisheries and Food.
- Thomas Jones, Sub-Officer (Part-time), Merionethshire Fire Brigade.
- Alice Katherine Kavanagh, Manageress, Airmen's Club, RAF Station, Kinloss.
- Herbert John Keen, Unit Operator, Hams Hall "B" Power Station, Midlands Region, Central Electricity Generating Board.
- John Holland Kilner, Illustrator, RAF Staff College, Andover.
- Sarah Kirkpatrick, Honorary Collector, Street Savings Group, Ballymena, County Antrim.
- Herbert Alfred Kitney, Senior Messenger, Public Record Office.
- William Knight, Chargchand Fitter, Signal Shop, British Railways Workshop, Crewe.
- Herbert Donald Reeve Largent, Skilled Forest Worker, Forestry Commission.
- Peter Ralph Latham, Inspector, Metropolitan Police.
- Wilhelmina Laurence. For services to the community in Tonbridge.
- Agnes Marion Lawrence. For services to the community in Llangrove, Ross-on-Wye.
- Frederick Leslie Leader, Warrant Officer No. 329 (Finsbury) Squadron, Air Training Corps.
- Flora Elizabeth Le Gear, Manageress, Navy, Army and Air Force Institutes, Lisburn, County Antrim.
- David Morris Lewis, Chief Officer, Albany Prison.
- Henry William Lindfield, lately Carpentry and Joinery Instructor, Park House School, Godalming, Surrey.
- Tom Atherton Lloyd, Police Sergeant, Air Force Department Constabulary.
- Harold Edward Lockett, Foreman Electrical Fitter in charge of Fitting Shop, Midlands Electricity Board.
- George Samuel Lovering, Chief Cook, SS Tilapa, Elders & Fyffes Ltd.
- John Townsend Lutener, Technical Officer, Post Office Satellite Earth Station, Goonhilly.
- Albert Lymn, lately Airport Foreman Grade III, Edinburgh Airport, Board of Trade.
- Angus MacDonald, Donkeyman, SS King George V, David MacBrayne Ltd.
- Malcolm MacDonald, Coxwain, Stornoway Lifeboat, Royal National Lifeboat Institution.
- Leslie Hemy McGarry, Experimental Worker Grade 4, Explosives Research and Development Establishment, Waltham Abbey.
- Hugh Gilmour McGrattan, Head Observer, Coleraine, County Antrim, Royal Observer Corps.
- Alice Maud Mary Mack, Forewoman, Leethams (Twilfit) Ltd, Portsmouth.
- George MacRae, Horticultural Superintendent, Northern Area U.K. Region, Commonwealth War Graves Commission.
- William Miller McVinnie, Lately Chief Clerk Officer, HM Prison Edinburgh.
- Alfred Dennis Maddrell, Coxswain, Port Erin Lifeboat, Royal National Lifeboat Institution.
- Mabel Marler, Barmaid, House of Lords.
- Charles Marooth, Technical Officer, Telephone Manager's Office, Liverpool.
- Joseph Percival Marshall, Inspector, Lincolnshire Special Constabulary.
- Gordon Kenneth Mason, Warden, Woodwalton Fen National Nature Reserve.
- Marion Reid Matson, Chief Inspector, Northumberland Constabulary.
- Lillian Kate Matthews, Quality Controller, British Van Heusen Company Ltd, Crewkerne.
- Samuel Edward Mee, Station Officer (Part-time), Derbyshire Fire Brigade.
- William Milne, Chief Occupational Supervisor, Department of Employment and Productivity.
- Thomas Money, Agricultural worker, Wicken, Cambridgeshire.
- David More, Warden, Forestry Commission.
- Charles Edward Mortimer, Chief Attendant, National Gallery.
- Olive Morton, Centre Organiser, Risca Urban District, Monmouthshire, Women's Royal Voluntary Service.
- Albert Mosdale, Superintendent, Detail Manufacture, Hawker Siddeley Aviation Ltd, Manchester.
- Charles Leonard Moses, First-class Gas Fitter, Plymouth District, South Western Gas Board.
- William Murphy, Office Keeper (Grade III), Welsh Office.
- Elizabeth Mary Murray, lately Supervisor, Stainburn Central Kitchen, Workington.
- William Trimble Newman, Works Overseer Grade IV, HM Stationery Office.
- John George Oliver, Technical Supervisor (Boilermakers), HM Dockyard, Rosyth.
- Arthur Albert Parker, Chief Engineer, Kent County Constabulary.
- Cyril Ernest John Parker, Jointer, St. Albans and Stevenage District, Eastern Electricity Board.
- Wilfred Frederic George Pepin, Honorary Collector, Street Savings Group, Bournemouth.
- Lennie Gwenllyan May Perkins, Commandant, Shropshire Branch, British Red Cross Society.
- Emlyn Phillips, Assistant Commissioner, North Monmouthshire District, St. John Ambulance Brigade.
- Richard George Phillips, lately Packing Station Manager, Land Settlement Association Estate, Newent, Gloucestershire.
- Frank Platt, Telephone Switchboard Operator, Department of Employment and Productivity.
- Arnold Reynolds Plummer, V.A.D. Member, Surrey Branch, British Red Cross Society.
- John Robert Plummer, Coxswain, Caister Lifeboat, Royal National Lifeboat Institution.
- Howard William Polkinghorne, Inspector, Metropolitan Police.
- John Price, Chief Inspector (Postal), Swansea.
- Ernest William Prior, Senior Hall Porter, British Council.
- John Pryde, General Foreman, James White (Contractors) Ltd, Edinburgh.
- Robert Rae, Storekeeper, Northern Lighthouse Board Depot, Oban.
- Thomas Irvine Ramsay, Able Seaman, SS Sir William Walker, General Service Contracts, Merchant Navy.
- Geoffrey Ernest Read, Head Herdsman (Daily), East Anglian Real Property Company Ltd, Norfolk. For services to stockmanship and to the interests of stockmen.
- Harold Ernest John Regler, Boatswain, MV Aranda, Shaw Savill & Albion Company, Ltd.
- George Frederick Revill, Motor Transport Driver, RAF Bawtry.
- Charles Rex, Official driver, British Consulate-General, Düsseldorf.
- Elizabeth Richardson, Centre Organiser, Ashmgton Centre, Northumberland, Women's Royal Voluntary Service.
- Germaine Roads, lately Foster Parent, Bournemouth, Hampshire.
- Rita May Rogers, Experimental Worker Grade I, Ministry of Defence.
- Margaret Crombie Rutherford, Senior Enrolled Nurse, Stobhill Hospital, Glasgow.
- John Angus Sheldon, Technical Officer, General Post Office,
- William Sheldon, Tube Drawer, Reynolds Tube Company Ltd, Tyseley, Birmingham.
- Edward Arthur Sibbick, Upholsterer, Osborne House, Isle of Wight.
- Albert Leslie Simmonds, Foreman, Aircraft Equipment Division, MB. Metals Ltd, Portslade, Sussex.
- Archibald Smith, Foreman Shipwright, Upper Clyde Shipbuilders Ltd, Glasgow.
- Cecil John Smith, lately Supervisory Foreman, Frome Division, Somerset County Council.
- Mabel Smorfit, Honorary Collector, Street Savings Group, York.
- Roy Frederick Charles Souter, Sergeant, Mid-Anglia Constabulary.
- Roger Leslie Spindler, Operating Theatre Attendant, West Middlesex Hospital, Isleworth, Middlesex.
- George Stephenson, lately Inshore Fisherman, Lowestoft.
- Albert Arthur Streeter, Hospital Chief Officer, Wakefield Prison.
- Ernest Swift, Inspector, Tonbridge Postal Sorting Office.
- Frances Tandy, Honorary Collector, Street Savings Group, Birmingham.
- Frank Leonard Thompson, Area Superintendent, London Ambulance Service.
- William Joseph Towriss, Checker, Grimsby Docks, British Transport Docks Board.
- Desmond George Trimble, Boatswain, MV Aureol, Ocean Fleets Ltd.
- Houssein Velettin, Foreman At Trades Class I, Ministry of Defence, Cyprus.
- Sydney Welborn, Trackman, Chief Civil Engineer's Department, York, Eastern Region, British Railways Board.
- Frank Leslie Wendon, Receptionist, National Hospital for Nervous Diseases, London W.C.1.
- Frank Jordan Weston, lately Senior Foreman, Fitting and Assembly Shops, A. A. Jones & Shipman Ltd. For services to export.
- Frederick Wilkins, Senior Officeman, Derby Technical Centre, British Railways Board.
- John Pryce Williams, Office Keeper, Ministry of Public Building and Works.
- Jesse Wilson, Ranger, Stormont Estate.
- George Raymond Wood, Senior Tester, Walter Somers Ltd, Halesowen, Worcestershire.
- Charles Woodward, Head Warder, Imperial War Museum.
- Edith Florence Yates, Centre Organiser, Swanscombe Urban District, Women's Royal Voluntary Service.

Overseas Territories

- Ida Brooks, Assistant Matron, Her Majesty's Prison, Bahama Islands.
- Emmanuel Cruickshank, Temporary Supervisor and Maintenance Officer (Mechanical Equipment), Public Works Department, Grenada.
- Rudolph Arundell Phillip, Engineering Assistant (Roads), Grenada.
- Desmond Thomas Rogers, Road Foreman, Public Works Department, British Honduras.
- So Tse-chung, Clerk Class I, Establishment Branch, Colonial Secretariat, Hong Kong.
- William Charles Somner, Roads Superintendent, Public Works Department, Bermuda.
- Tang Kwok-leung, Clerk Class I, Public Works Department, Hong Kong.
- Maurice Walcott, lately Foreman Mason, Public Health Engineering Unit, Saint Lucia.
- Ada Theodora Waters. For services to the community in the British Virgin Islands.

State of New South Wales

- Norton John Crane. For services to the community in the Moree district.
- Alderman Kenneth Jones. For services to local government in Armidale.
- William Joseph Keegan, lately Supervisor of General Staff, Sydney Hospital.
- Jessie Isobel Mudge. For services to nursing.
- Dulcie Catherine Muffet. For services to the community in Forbes.
- Elsie Mary Russell. For services to the community in Newcastle.
- Harold David Stevenson. For services to the community in Westmead.
- Andrew Scott Tait. For services to the community, particularly to ex-Servicemen in Sydney.

State of Victoria

- Patricia Joy Balfour, Base Radio Operator, Moyhu Fire Brigades Group.
- Edgar John Barrett, Secretary, Geelong City Urban Fire Brigade.
- Thomas Charles Beaumont, Superintendent, Ballarat Botanical Gardens.
- Thomas Brown, Corporal, Boronia Basin Rescue Squad, St. John Ambulance Brigade.
- Ronald Frederick Buchanan, Inquiry Officer, Premier's Department, Victorian Public Service.
- William Buckle, Sergeant, Springvale Rescue Squad, St. John Ambulance Brigade.
- Balda Butterfield. For services to the community in Springmount.
- Robert Morris Campbell. For services to the community in Daylesford, particularly to firefighting.
- Kenneth Henry Cassidy. For services to the community in Newstead, particularly to firefighting.
- John Joseph Cooper. For services to the community in Bacchus Marsh, particularly to firefighting.
- Brian French, Sergeant, Wangaratta Rescue Squad, St. John Ambulance Brigade.
- David Edwin Thomas Gibson. For services to the community in Wedderburn, particularly to firefighting.
- Ronald John Jilbert, Group Officer, Swan Hill Rural Fire Brigades Group.
- Alan Martin Judd. For services to the community in Pearcedale.
- Leslie John Kaye, Group Officer, Maldon Fire Brigades Group.
- Emil Motchall. For services to the community in Panton Hill, particularly to fire-fighting.
- Robert Bruce Ness. For services to the community in Kangaroo Ground, particularly to firefighting.
- William Charles Price, Group Communications Officer, Alexandra Fire Brigades Group.
- William Anderson Purcell. For services to the community in Yea.
- Frederick William Benjamin Rayner. For services to the community in Myrtleford.
- Alfred William Richardson. For services to the community in Myrtleford.
- Grenville Thomas Roddick, Superintendent, Queenscliff Lifeboat Service.
- William Halman Rowe, Deputy Group Officer, Maldon Fire Brigades Group.
- Richard Shrimpton, Waverley Rescue Squad, St. John Ambulance Brigade.
- Colin Graeme Turnbull, Group Officer, Wedderburn Fire Brigades Group.
- James Stewart Venters. For services to the community in Stonehaven.

State of Western Australia

- Annie Adelaide Berry. For services to the community in Spearwood and Carnarvon.
- Emma Constance Dawson. For social welfare services in Busselton.
- Ettie Ritcher, General Secretary and Welfare Officer, Civilian Maimed and Limbless Association.
- Ernest George Taylor, Commanding Officer, Sea Cadet Corps, Albany.
- Gwendoline Trivett, President, Red Cross Society, Fremantle.

=== Royal Red Cross (RRC) ===
- Cynthia Felicity Joan Cooke, ARRC, Principal Matron (Tutor), Queen Alexandra's Royal Naval Nursing Service.
- Lieutenant-Colonel Mary Anne Gara (301727), Queen Alexandra's Royal Army Nursing Corps.
- Wing Officer Kathleen Keane (406210), Princess Mary's Royal Air Force Nursing Service.

==== Associate of the Royal Red Cross (ARRC) ====
- Major Violet Marjorie Jones (336944), Queen Alexandra's Royal Army Nursing Corps.
- Lieutenant-Colonel Audrey Hayward (213440), Queen Alexandra's Royal Army Nursing Corps, Territorial and Army Volunteer Reserve.
- Lieutenant-Colonel Gwenillian Williams (313414), Queen Alexandra's Royal Army Nursing Corps, Territorial and Army Volunteer Reserve.
- Eileen Mary Northway, Superintending Sister, Queen Alexandra's Royal Naval Nursing Service.
- Euphemia Hastie White, Head Naval Nurse, Queen Alexandra's Royal Naval Nursing Service.
- Squadron Officer Kathleen Bernadette Hayes (407149), Princess Mary's Royal Air Force Nursing Service.

=== Air Force Cross (AFC) ===
Royal Navy

- Lieutenant Commander Ronald Edward Coventry.

Army

- Major George Howard Southall (360990), Army Air Corps.

Royal Air Force

- Squadron Leader John Black (1822006).
- Squadron Leader Ronald William Bridge (4094028).
- Squadron Leader Terence Maxwell Hamer AFM, (1584832).
- Squadron Leader Donald Malcolm Holliday (4161921).
- Squadron Leader Edward Joseph Longden (577828).
- Squadron Leader Michael Raymond Nash (4089003).
- Squadron Leader Bernard James Noble (583275).
- Squadron Leader Hugh William John Rigg (607600).
- Squadron Leader Alfred Charles Shafe (175080).
- Squadron Leader Nigel Raymond Williams (2521488).
- Flight Lieutenant Francis Edward Debenham (188083).

Bar to Air Force Cross

- Wing Commander Colin Henry Bidie, AFC, (772776).
- Squadron Leader Eric Edward Fell, AFC, (1179544).

=== Air Force Medal (AFM) ===
- X3503154 Flight Sergeant Stanley Phipps, Royal Air Force.

=== Queen's Police Medal (QPM) ===
England and Wales

- Walter Stansfield, MC, Chief Constable, Derby County and Borough Constabulary.
- Harold Hubert Salisbury, Chief Constable, York and North East Yorkshire Police.
- Walter Baharie, Assistant Chief Constable, Northumberland Constabulary.
- Aubrey Burt, MBE, Assistant and Deputy Chief Constable, Bristol Constabulary.
- Eric Hall Watson, MBE, Assistant and Deputy Chief Constable, Warwickshire Constabulary.
- Sydney George Leader, Assistant Chief Constable, Sussex Constabulary.
- Henry James Kidd-Brown Devlin, lately Acting Chief Constable, Southend-on-Sea County Borough Police Force.
- Joseph Scott Hall, Commander, Metropolitan Police.
- Alexander Flett, lately Chief Superintendent, Metropolitan Police.
- Richard Leslie Wearmouth, Chief Superintendent, Durham Constabulary.
- Arthur Green, Chief Superintendent, Metropolitan Police.
- Edmund Charles Desmond Thorp, Superintendent, West Yorkshire Constabulary.
- John James Conrad Weisner, Chief Superintendent, Metropolitan Police.

Inspectorate

- Jeanie Sarah Stirling Law, Assistant Inspector of Constabulary.

Scotland

- James Lorimer, MBE, Assistant and Deputy Chief Constable, Fife Constabulary.
- William Ian McLaren, lately Chief Superintendent, Edinburgh City Police.

Northern Ireland

- Isaac Keightley, BEM, Head Constable, Royal Ulster Constabulary.

British Airports Authority Constabulary

- Major William Ronnie, OBE, Chief Constable, British Airports Authority Constabulary.

State of New South Wales

- Andrew McCarthy, Superintendent, 2nd Class, New South Wales Police Force.
- Roy Alfred Ashton, Superintendent, 2nd Class, New South Wales Police Force.
- Raymond Horace Marsh, Superintendent, 2nd Class, New South Wales Police Force.
- Allan Rolf Evans, Superintendent, 2nd Class, New South Wales Police Force.
- Stanley Kenneth Bush, Superintendent, 2nd Class, New South Wales Police Force.
- Donald Hector McKinnon Campbell, Superintendent, 2nd Class, New South Wales Police Force.
- Donald George Fergusson, Detective Superintendent, 2nd Class, New South Wales Police Force.
- Brian Conrad Doherty, Superintendent, 2nd Class, New South Wales Police Force.
- Ernest James Lynch, Superintendent, 2nd Class, New South Wales Police Force.
- Maurice Haydn Harrison, Superintendent, 2nd Class, New South Wales Police Force.

State of Victoria

- James Francis Rosengren, Assistant Commissioner, Victoria Police Force.
- Gilbert Trainor, Superintendent, Grade I, Victoria Police Force.
- John Gilbert Brown, Superintendent, Grade I, Victoria Police Force.
- Leonard Mason, Superintendent, Victoria Police Force.

State of South Australia

- Leonard Ambrose Coghlan, Inspector, 1st Class, South Australia Police Force.
- Paul Turner, Inspector, 1st Class, South Australia Police Force.
- Thomas Robert Howie, Inspector, 1st Class, South Australia Police Force.

State of Western Australia

- Richard Thomas Napier, Commissioner, Western Australian Police Force.
- Ronald Charles Salter, Deputy Commissioner, Western Australian Police Force.
- Albert Francis Anderson, Inspector, 1st Class, Western Australian Police Force.
- Charles Thomas Clarke Pollard, Inspector, 1st Class, Western Australian Police Force.

Nigeria

- Leonard John Mackey, lately Assistant Commissioner, Nigeria Police.

=== Queen's Fire Services Medal (QFSM) ===
England and Wales

- Norman Wilson Goy, Divisional Officer, Grade I (Deputy Chief Officer), Bradford Fire Brigade.
- Reginald Edward Frank Whillock, Divisional Officer, Grade I, London Fire Brigade.
- William Babington, Chief Officer, Kent Fire Brigade.
- Robert Elliott Cooper, Chief Officer, Sunder land Fire Brigade.

Scotland

- John Stewart, Firemaster, Lanarkshire Fire Brigade.

State of New South Wales

- Brian Louis Smith, Brigade Inspector, New South Wales Fire Brigade.
- Raymond Vincent Lynch, Brigade Inspector, New South Wales Fire Brigade.
- Harold Curtis Parker, District Officer, New South Wales Fire Brigade.
- Andrew Speed, Brigade Captain, New South Wales Fire Brigade.
- Ernest James Webster, Brigade Captain, New South Wales Fire Brigade.
- Albert Raymond Victor Paton, Volunteer Fireman, lately Brigade Captain, New South Wales Fire Brigade.
- Charles Victor McIlwaine, Brigade Captain, New South Wales Fire Brigade.

State of Victoria

- Percy Alan Gray, BEM, Deputy Chief Officer, Country Fire Authority.

State of Western Australia

- Frank Ernest William Harding, Chief Officer of Fire Brigades, Western Australian Fire Brigades Board.

=== Colonial Police Medal (CPM) ===
Brunei

- Michael Joseph Heincen, Superintendent, Royal Brunei Police Force.

Overseas Territories

- Chak Tong, Principal Fireman, Hong Kong Fire Services.
- Cheung Yick, Sergeant, Royal Hong Kong Police Force.
- Chung Hing, Principal Fireman, Hong Kong Fire Services.
- Clifford Michael Dumper, Assistant Superintendent, British Division, New Hebrides Constabulary.
- Peter Joseph Felix, Assistant Superintendent, Royal Saint Lucia Police Force.
- John Hogarth Grieve, Senior Superintendent, Royal Hong Kong Police Force.
- Samuel Frank Harvey, Inspector, Royal Hong Kong Auxiliary Police Force.
- Gulam Hyder, Senior Inspector, Royal Hong Kong Auxiliary Police Force.
- Fred Jackson, Assistant Chief Fire Officer, Hong Kong Fire Services.
- Kam Yu-lam, Sergeant, Royal Hong Kong Police Force.
- Lui Ho, Fireman Class II, Hong Kong Fire Services.
- David Edward William O'Brien, MBE, Senior Superintendent, Royal Hong Kong Police Force.
- Ieli Irava Samuela, Sergeant, Fiji Police Force.
- Murray Todd, Superintendent, Royal Hong Kong Police Force.
- Frank Wakefield, Superintendent, Royal Hong Kong Police Force.
- Yuen Wah, Sergeant, Royal Hong Kong Police Force.

=== Queen's Commendation for Valuable Service in the Air ===
Royal Air Force

- Wing Commander James Henry Anthony Winship (4048591), (Retired).
- Wing Commander Ronald Charles Wood (607161).
- Squadron Leader Graham David Andrews (607757).
- Squadron Leader Walter Ernest Close (2501989).
- Squadron Leader Gerald Colin Crumbie (608021).
- Squadron Leader Sidney Albert Edwards (607641).
- Squadron Leader Paul Lewis Gray (607314).
- Squadron Leader John King (3504434), (Retired).
- Squadron Leader Robert John Manning (607738).
- Squadron Leader Roderick Frank Mundy (607653).
- Squadron Leader Michael George Simmons (607734).
- Squadron Leader Harvey Horace Thompson, AFC, (51124).
- Flight Lieutenant Alan Armitage (3136361).
- Flight Lieutenant John Denys Armstrong (2617026).
- Flight Lieutenant Robin Lindsay Blair Bell (4157915).
- Flight Lieutenant Victor Richard Henry Blake (585541).
- Flight Lieutenant Michael Noel Bond (2617416).
- Flight Lieutenant Bruce Sidney Bull, AFM, (1583781).
- Flight Lieutenant Gerald Foster (584261).
- Flight Lieutenant John Michael Peter Hough (4230914).
- Flight Lieutenant Robert Derek Lightfoot (608102).
- Flight Lieutenant Anthony Arthur Norman (4083498).
- Flight Lieutenant Trevor Charles Wingham Peacock (572652).
- Flight Lieutenant Michael James Douglas Stear (5011693).
- Flight Lieutenant Bernard Alexander Stevens (500483).
- Flying Officer Douglas George Lawton (772540).
- Master Air Electronics Operator Roy Crow (K4034658).

United Kingdom

- Captain Norman Victor Bristow, Flight Training Manager, V.C.10 Flight, British Overseas Airways Corporation.
- Captain Richard Alistair Callander, Flight Development Captain, British Overseas Airways Corporation.
- John George Peter Morton, Senior Test Pilot, Westland Helicopters Ltd, Yeovil, Somerset.
- Joseph Thomas Partridge, Flight Engineering Training Superintendent, V.C.10 Flight, British Overseas Airways Corporation.
- Duncan Menzies Soutar Simpson, Deputy Chief Test Pilot, Hawker Siddeley Aviation Ltd, Dunsfold Aerodrome, Godalming, Surrey.

== Australia ==
=== Knight Bachelor ===
- John David Bates, CBE, VRD, Chairman, Australian Tourist Commission.
- Charles Sylvester Booth, CBE, Chairman of the Council, Australian Administrative Staff College.
- Brigadier Frederick Oliver Chilton, CBE, DSO, Chairman, Repatriation Commission.
- George Russell Drysdale, of Kilcare Heights, New South Wales. For distinguished services to art.
- Henry Norman Giles, OBE, of North Adelaide, South Australia. For distinguished services to export, industry, banking and government.
- The Honourable William Crawford Haworth, MP. For distinguished services to parliament and to the community.
- Cecil Thomas Looker, of North Balwyn, Victoria. For distinguished services to commerce and government.
- Ian William Wark, CMG, CBE, of Mont Albert, Victoria. For distinguished services to education and science.

=== Order of the Bath ===
==== Companion of the Order of the Bath (CB) ====
Military Division

- Air Vice-Marshal Brian Alexander Eaton, CBE, DSO, DFC, (0344), Royal Australian Air Force, Chief of Staff, Headquarters Far East Air Force.

=== Order of Saint Michael and Saint George ===
==== Knight Commander of the Order of St Michael and St George (KCMG) ====
- The Honourable David Brand, Premier of Western Australia.

==== Companion of the Order of St Michael and St George (CMG) ====
- John Herbert Broinowski, President, Council for Rehabilitation of the Disabled.
- Ada May Norris, OBE, President, Australian National Council of Women.
- The Honourable Frederick Meares Osborne, DSC, VRD, of Longueville, New South Wales. For distinguished services to Government and the community.
- Edwin Peter Spencer Roberts, of Toobeah, Queensland. For services to Government and the wool industry.

=== Order of the British Empire ===
==== Knight Commander of the Order of the British Empire (KBE) ====
Military Division

- Vice Admiral Victor Alfred Smith, CB, CBE, DSC, Royal Australian Navy, Chief of the Naval Staff.

==== Commander of the Order of the British Empire (CBE) ====
Military Division

- Surgeon Rear Admiral Robert Michael Coplans, LMSSA, QHS, Royal Australian Navy Medical Director-General.
- Major-General Colin Marshall Gurner, ED, QHP, (47545), Royal Australian Army Medical Corps, Director-General of Medical Services.
- Brigadier Erroll John Holmes Howard (2146), Australian Staff Corps, Chief of Staff, Headquarters Eastern Command.

Civil Division

- William Alan Grainger, Federal President, Australian Dental Association.
- Ivor Henry Thomas Hele, OBE, of Aldinga, South Australia. For services to art.
- Iris McKenzie Hyde, MBE, of New Lambton, New South Wales. For continued services to the community and politics.
- The Honourable Mr. Justice Anthony Frank Mason, lately Solicitor-General of the Commonwealth of Australia.
- Kenneth Harold Vial, Vice-Chairman, Australian National Airlines Commission.
- Hermann Puttmann Weber, of East Ivanhoe, Victoria. For services to education and science.
- The Honourable Mr. Acting Justice Howard Edgar Zelling, QC, of Adelaide, South Australia. For services to the legal profession.

==== Officer of the Order of the British Empire (OBE) ====
Military Division

Royal Australian Navy

- Commander Warren John Brash, Royal Australian Navy, Military Secretary to the Governor-General.
- Commander Osmonde Marshall May, VRD, Royal Australian Naval Emergency Reserve.

Australian Military Forces

- Lieutenant-Colonel John Alexander Clark, Royal Australian Infantry Corps. Lately on loan to the Malaysian Armed Forces.
- Colonel John Creighton Dean (237542), Royal Corps of Australian Electrical and Mechanical Engineers.
- Lieutenant-Colonel George Alfred Granville Holzberger, ED, (110306), Royal Australian Artillery Corps.
- Colonel Norman Ronald McLeod (250), Australian Staff Corps.
- Colonel Gerald Otto O'Day (337551), Australian Staff Corps.

Royal Australian Air Force

- Group Captain Samuel William Dallywater (05824).
- Group Captain (now Air Commodore) Philip Henry Napoleon Opas, QC, (255040), Citizen Air Force.

Civil Division

- Margaret Adele Alldritt, MBE, of Point Piper, New South Wales. For continued services to community and social welfare.
- Edley Hector Anderson, MB, BS, Director of Medical Services, QANTAS.
- Charles William Bennett, FRACS, President, Royal Victorian Institute for the Blind.
- The Venerable Archdeacon Douglas Blake, Archdeacon of Geelong, Victoria. For services to migrant assimilation and community welfare.
- Leslie Brewster, of East Brighton, Victoria. For services to industry and government.
- Roy Edward Bullock, Deputy Clerk of the Senate.
- Inspector Errol Sydney Canney, of Hackett, Australian Capital Territory, former Police Adviser to the Commander of the United Nations Forces in Cyprus. For public service to Australia in Cyprus.
- Harry Chan, of Darwin, Northern Territory. For outstanding services to government, the community, and politics.
- Roy William Burleigh Davies, First Assistant Secretary, Planning and Procurement, Department of Supply.
- Ellestan Joyce Dusting, Private Secretary to the former Minister for External Affairs.
- Marcus de Laune Faunce, MB, BS, of Forrest, Australian Capital Territory. For public service.
- Eldred Arthur Green, of Geraldton, Western Australia. For services to primary industry.
- James Arnold Hancock, Vice-Chairman, Commonwealth Serum Laboratories.
- Alfred Henry Humphry, MB, BS, Commonwealth Director of Health, Queensland.
- Raphael Joseph, Federal Vice-President, Australian Natives' Association.
- Councillor John Verran McConnell, of Eltham, Victoria. For services to politics and local government.
- Henry Vincent Napier, of Castlecrag, New South Wales. For services to sport.
- John Edwin Neary, of Whale Beach, New South Wales. For services to the performing arts.
- Thomas Arthur Sale, FRCS, FRACS, of Rockhampton, Queensland. Former Team Leader, Surgical Team, Biên Hòa, South Vietnam.
- James Suttor White, of Boggabilla, New South Wales. For services to international relations.

==== Member of the Order of the British Empire (MBE) ====
Military Division

Royal Australian Navy

- Lieutenant Noel William Roy Edwards.
- Engineer Lieutenant Harold Patrick Shaw, (Emergency List).

Australian Military Forces

- Major (Quarter Master) David Douglas Collins (646), Royal Australian Infantry Corps.
- Warrant Officer Class II Joseph Flannery (29707), Royal Australian Infantry Corps.
- Chaplain Third Class John Maurice Hoare, ED, (2165390), Royal Australian Army Chaplain's Division.
- Warrant Officer Class II Stanley David James (11320), Royal Australian Artillery Corps.
- Captain Charles Rowland Bromley Richards, ED, (251120), Royal Australian Army Medical Corps.
- Warrant Officer Class II James Robert Settree (262336), Royal Australian Infantry Corps.
- Captain James William Turpie (2905030), Royal Australian Artillery Corps.
- Major Robert Arthur Warr (3337), Special List for the Australian Staff Corps.

Royal Australian Air Force

- Warrant Officer Bruce Robert Bovard (A2484).
- Warrant Officer James Joseph Nolan (A2804).
- Flight Lieutenant (Acting Squadron Leader) Charles James John Redenbach (035673), Citizen Air Force.
- Warrant Officer Albert Thomas Sheean (A23725).

Civil Division

- Charles Amato, of Rome, Italy. Clerk, External Affairs Department.
- Ethel Alice Ames, JP, of South Perth. For services to ex-Servicemen and women.
- Kenneth Edwin Andrews, Chief Engineer, Major Contracts, Snowy Mountains Hydro-Electricity Authority.
- The Reverend John James Benjamin, of West Heidelberg, Victoria. For services to the welfare of ex-Servicemen and women and their dependents.
- Gordina Beveridge, of Norfolk Island. For services to the community.
- Arthur William Bishop, Superintendent (Administration) Engineering Division, New South Wales Postmaster-General's Department.
- Walter James Bishop, of Griffith, New South Wales For services to ex-Servicemen.
- Maxwell Phillip Chong, Technical Officer, Grade 2, Bureau of Dental Standards, Victoria, Department of Health.
- William Leslie Dow, of Bathurst, New South Wales. For services to the community and social welfare.
- Pauline Fanning, Chief Australian Reference Librarian, National Library of Australia.
- Atholl Douglas Fleming, of Point Piper, New South Wales. For services to broadcasting and children's education and entertainment.
- Mary Amelia Fox, Regional Director of Training, Young Women's Christian Association, North West Australia.
- Edward David Frewin, former Assistant Superintendent, Industrial and Safety Personnel, New South Wales Postmaster-General's Department.
- Walter Ernest Harvey, Senior Contracts Officer, Office of the High Commissioner for Australia, Australia House, London.
- Bertram Charles Hedgcock, of Ballarat, Victoria. For services to the community and social welfare.
- Councillor Brian Francis Hegarty, of Cassilis, New South Wales. For services to local government.
- Kenneth William Hoffmann, JP, Chief Administrator, Returned Services League, South Australia.
- Irene Ellen Healy Hughes, State Secretary, War Widows' Guild of Australia (Queensland).
- Pearl Gladys James, of Nightcliffe, South Australia. For services to the community and social welfare.
- Allan Ewen Russell Kennedy, of London. For services to sport.
- Mildred Amy Leake, Matron, Repatriation General Hospital, Daw Park, South Australia.
- Gordon Llewellyn Leech, of Cronulla, New South Wales. For services to the community.
- Henri Alexander Theodore Le Grand, of Watson, Australian Capital Territory. For services to the arts.
- Harvard Ernest Locke, Secretary, Army Health Benefits Society, Department of the Army.
- Griffith Donald McKay, of Surfer's Paradise, Queensland. For services to the welfare and rehabilitation of wounded Servicemen.
- Archibald Vincent McKinnon, of Morisset, New South Wales. For services to the community and social welfare.
- Rita Frances Mary Mitchell, of Gladesville, New South Wales. For services to the community.
- John Alfred North, ED, Commercial Manager, Ansett Airlines of Australia.
- Kazimierz Nowicki, Engineer Class 3, Postmaster-General's Department. For public service and service to migrants.
- Mabel Venn Parker, of Rmgwood, Victoria. For services to the community.
- Leslie Gordon Poyser, First Assistant Secretary, Defence Planning Division, Department of Defence.
- Douglas Robinson, of Ryde, New South Wales. For services to the physically handicapped.
- Leslie William Smith, of Burwood, New South Wales. For services to pharmacy.
- Honor Madeline Soar (Sister Honor Madeline Hayes), Senior Sister, Darwin Hospital.
- Harold Victor Sykes, JP, of Burwood, Victoria. For services to the community.
- Raymond William Viney, Finance Manager, Commonwealth Scientific and Industrial Research Organisation.
- Joseph Edward Walsh, Assistant Comptroller-General (Management Services), Department of Customs and Excise.

=== Companion of the Imperial Service Order (ISO) ===
- James Miller Henderson, Controller, Royal Australian Mint, Department of the Treasury.
- Edric Marshall Wood, Assistant Director, Postal Services, Postmaster-General's Department, Queensland.

=== British Empire Medal (BEM) ===
Military Division

Royal Australian Navy

- Chief Petty Officer Writer John Frederick Connellan (R29091).
- Chief Engineroom Artificer Colin John Dodds (R52973).
- Chief Communications Yeoman Robert Selwyn Huggins (F24477), Royal Australian Fleet Reserve.
- Chief Electrician (Communications) Gerald Frederick Mitchell (R51649); on loan to the Royal Malaysian Navy.
- Chief Petty Officer Malcolm Ross Sheather (R49375).

Australian Military Forces

- Staff Sergeant James Francis Callaghan (19722), Royal Australian Artillery Corps.
- Sergeant Keith Francis Fox (22683), Royal Australian Signals Corps.
- Sergeant Kelvin Hundt (2189570), Royal Australian Infantry Corps.
- Sergeant Pieter Authorius Koster (36472), Royal Australian Infantry Corps.
- Staff Sergeant Neville Lawrence Krause (15048), Royal Australian Infantry Corps.
- Sergeant (Temporary Warrant Officer Class II) James Kenneth Myles (212857), Royal Australian Infantry Corps.
- Sergeant (Temporary Staff Sergeant) Rodney James Robertson (53268), Royal Australian Artillery Corps.
- Private (Temporary Warrant Officer Class II) Peter Samuga (8386), Royal Australian Infantry Corps.

Royal Australian Air Force

- Flight Sergeant Annie May Hyland (W35845), Women's Royal Australian Air Force.
- Corporal Francis Christopher Lepinath (A12232).
- Sergeant Graeme Thomas Malone (A34972).
- Sergeant Douglas Oliver (A55472).
- Flight Sergeant Lucky William Watson (A32873).

Civil Division

- Sauri Arai, Sergeant First Class, Papua and New Guinea Constabulary, Port Moresby.
- Phyllis Jean Brown, Telephonist, Government House, Canberra.
- Malvena Maria Catherine Degens, Steno-Secretary to the Secretary, Department of External Territories.
- Janet Lilian Dobson, JP, of Maidstone, Victoria, President, Sunshine Ladies Benevolent Society.
- Beatrice Irene Donaldson, Vice-President, Finley Branch, Australian Red Cross Society.
- Anne Evans, of Merewether, New South Wales. For services to sport.
- Frederick Francis Farrar, Leading Hand Car Driver, Department of Supply, Melbourne.
- Noel Egbert Grevett, of Bondi Junction, New South Wales. For services to ex-Servicemen and the widows and children of Servicemen.
- Allan Victor Harriott, Gardener, Government House, Canberra.
- Henry Charles Harris, Senior Technical Officer Grade 1, Garden Island Dockyard.
- Thomas Chudleigh Hawkes, of Murwillumbah, New South Wales. For services to the community.
- Ronald James Hellard, Senior Technical Officer, Snowy Mountains Hydro-Electric Authority.
- Thomas Michael Hickey, JP, of Putney, New South Wales. For services to the community.
- Kenneth Wright Hill, Foreman Grade B, Government Aircraft Factories, Avalon.
- Reta Marion Jennison, JP, of Burra North, South Australia. For services to the community.
- Maria Alice Kappler, Steno-Secretary to the Director of Civil Defence.
- Samuel Hudson McClimont, Senior Technical Officer, Grade 2 Central Staff, Postmaster General's Department.
- Charles Harold McGregor, Foreman Grade 5, Garden Island Dockyard.
- May Maxwell, of Jolimont, Victoria. For services to journalism.
- Nora Winifred Mills, Clerical Assistant, Prime Minister's Department, Canberra.
- Vera Muriel Moody, of Toowoomba, Queensland. For services to the community, especially to the Red Cross Blood Transfusion Service.
- Bert Ashton Murphy, Senior Drafting Officer Grade 2, Postmaster-General's Department, Queensland.
- Gordon Clarence Pike, Transport Officer, House of Representatives, Canberra.
- Jack Axam Robson, of Wollstonecraft, Senior Inspecting Officer, Army Inspection Services.
- Margaret Scott, of Croydon Park, New South Wales. For services to the community.
- Eileen Mary Smith, President, Guyra Branch, United Hospitals Auxiliary.
- Ernest Guy Soanes, Senior Technical Officer Grade 2, Department of Shipping and Transport, Queensland.
- Clarice Dorothy Sommerville, Honorary Secretary, Ladies Auxiliary, Lane Cove Sydney Group.
- William John Strong, of Coogee, New South Wales. For services to ex-Servicemen.
- Norman Frederick Taylor, Temporary Works Supervisor, Department of Works, Canberra.
- Thomas Charles Wellings, Senior Messenger, Australia House, London.
- Robert Alexander Willis, of Lithgow, New South Wales. For services to the community.
- Jean Alice Wright, Steno-Secretary to the Director-General of Posts and Telegraphs.

=== Queen's Police Medal (QPM) ===
- Ernest Daniel Craig, Superintendent, Officer in Charge of Commonwealth Police, Victoria.

=== Air Force Cross (AFC) ===
Royal Australian Air Force

- Squadron Leader Henry John Maurice Baston (0211511).
- Squadron Leader Richard John Bomball (0313263).
- Warrant Officer Stanley Detlev Cooper (A32455).
- Squadron Leader Ernest Robert Jones (032871).
- Squadron Leader Robert Andrew Macintosh (037576).
- Squadron Leader John James McKenzie (0216734).
- Flight Lieutenant Brian Carmichael Newman (032856).
- Squadron Leader Frank Herbert Rule (02748).
- Squadron Leader Geoffrey William Talbot (032443).

=== Air Force Medal (AFM) ===
- Sergeant William Rex Harrington (A32932), Royal Australian Air Force.

=== Queen's Commendation for Valuable Service in the Air ===
Royal Australian Air Force

- Squadron Leader Charles Alasdair Ephraums (051686).
- Squadron Leader Peter William Kennedy (04667).
- Squadron Leader Keith Joseph Munday, MBE, (0216024).
- Squadron Leader Ronald George Raymond (033756).
- Flight Lieutenant William John Shepherd (0214552).

== Sierra Leone ==
=== Order of Saint Michael and Saint George ===
==== Companion of the Order of St Michael and St George (CMG) ====
- The Honourable Mr. Justice George Frederick Dove-Edwin, Member of the Sierra Leone and Gambia Court of Appeal.

=== Order of the British Empire ===
==== Knight Commander of the Order of the British Empire (KBE) ====
Civil Division

- The Honourable Mr. Justice Emile Fashole Luke, CBE, Speaker of the House of Representatives.

==== Commander of the Order of the British Empire (CBE) ====
Military Division

- Brigadier John Amadu Bangura, Force Commander, Royal Sierra Leone Military Forces.

Civil Division

- George Lawrence Valentine Williams, Secretary to the Prime Minister.

==== Officer of the Order of the British Empire (OBE) ====
Civil Division

- James Blyden Jenkins-Johnston, JP, formerly Town Clerk, Freetown City Council.
- Jenkins Nicholas Edmund George Smith, MVO, Deputy Commissioner of Police.

==== Member of the Order of the British Empire (MBE) ====
Civil Division

- Hainry Brima Alpha. For services to the coffee and cocoa industries.
- Alfred Max Bailor, Education Secretary, United Methodist Church.
- Daisy Sarifina Easmon-Delaney, Principal Matron, Ministry of Health.
- Paramount Chief Madam Woki Massaquoi, Paramount Chief, Gallinas Perri Chiefdom, Southern Province.

=== Queen's Police Medal (QPM) ===
- Prince Claudius Smith, Chief Superintendent, Sierra Leone Police Force.
- Thomas Mac Kessebeh, Superintendent, Sierra Leone Police Force.

== Trinidad And Tobago ==
=== Knight Bachelor ===
- Arthur Hugh McShine, Chief Justice.

== Gambia ==
=== Order of the British Empire ===
==== Officer of the Order of the British Empire (OBE) ====
Civil Division

- Gaspard Peter Francis Mendy, Comptroller of Customs and Excise.

==== Member of the Order of the British Empire (MBE) ====
Civil Division

- Alhaji Malick Ousman Manga, JP, Deputy Chairman, Public Service Commission.

=== British Empire Medal (BEM) ===
Civil Division

- Robert John Collingwood Lloyd, Principal Customs Officer, Customs Department.
- Momodou Juler Sabally, Senior Tractorman, Department of Agriculture.
- Banta Tunkara, Works Overseer, Brikama Area Council.

== Guyana ==
=== Knight Bachelor ===
- Harold Brodie Smith Bollers, Chief Justice.

=== Order of Saint Michael and Saint George ===
==== Companion of the Order of St Michael and St George (CMG) ====
- Sase Narain, JP. For services to the community.
- Lieutenant-Colonel Ronald James Pope (302850) The South Wales Borderers; lately on loan to the Guyana Defence Force as Colonel, Chief of Staff.

== Mauritius ==
=== Order of the British Empire ===
==== Commander of the Order of the British Empire (CBE) ====
Civil Division

- Pierre Guy Girald Balancy, Mauritius Ambassador to the United States of America and Permanent Representative at the United Nations.
- Frank Douse. For services to investment and economic development.
- Joseph Guy Forget, Mauritius Ambassador to France.

==== Officer of the Order of the British Empire (OBE) ====
Civil Division

- Marie Joseph Raymond Lamusse. For services to banking and economic development.
- Hurrypersad Ramnarain, Parliamentary Secretary, Ministry of Labour.

==== Member of the Order of the British Empire (MBE) ====
Civil Division

- Ahmadkhan Hyderkhan, Superintendent, Mauritius Police Force.
- Lutchmyparsadsingh Ramdin. For services in the development of the tea industry.
- Jean Claude Sauzier. For services to sport.
- Lucien Ignace Tranquille, Chief Fire Officer, City of Port Louis Fire Brigade.

=== Companion of the Imperial Service Order (ISO) ===
- Teeluckparsad Callychurn, Postmaster-General.

=== British Empire Medal (BEM) ===
Civil Division

- Abdool Wahab Bhudye, Sergeant, Mauritius Police Force.
- Gerard Vivian Gungaram, Constable/Private, Mauritius Police Force.
- Gabriel Cyril Labour, Inspector, Mauritius Police Force.
- Jean Cyril Sibaly, Inspector, Mauritius Police Force.
