= IsaKidd refining technology =

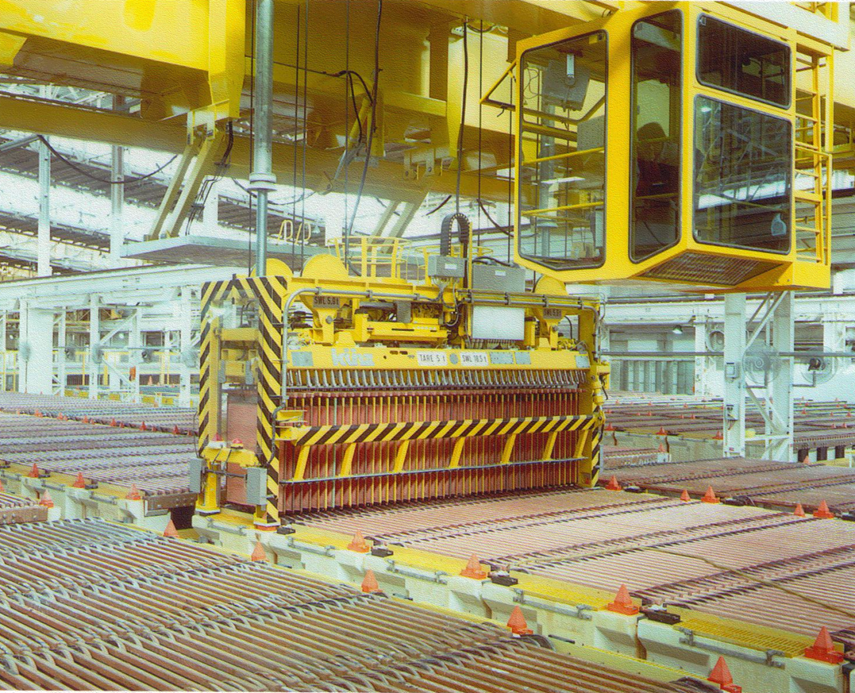
A modern copper refinery tankhouse using IsaKidd technology.

The IsaKidd Technology is a copper electrorefining and electrowinning technology that was developed independently by Copper Refineries Proprietary Limited (“CRL”), a Townsville, Queensland, subsidiary of MIM Holdings (which is now part of Glencore, and at the Falconbridge Nickel Mines now-dismantled Kidd Creek refinery that was at Timmins, Ontario. It is based around the use of reusable cathode starter sheets for copper electrorefining and the automated stripping of the deposited “cathode copper” from them.

== Overview ==
=== The old way of electrorefining copper (pre-1978) ===
The usual process of electrorefining copper consists of placing a copper anode (about 99.5–99.7% pure copper) in sulfuric acid (H_{2}SO_{4}) bath of copper electrolyte, together with a cathode, and passing a current between the anode and cathode through an external circuit. At the applied electropotential, copper and less noble elements dissolve in the electrolyte, while elements more noble than copper, such as gold (Au) and silver (Ag), do not. Under the influence of the applied electrical potential, copper ions migrate from the anode and deposit on the cathode, forming cathode copper.

The current IsaKidd technology represents the merger of the copper refining technologies developed by the two different organisations. The initial Isa Process development in the late 1970s, with its reusable stainless-steel cathode starter sheets, represented an advance on the previous technology of single-use starter sheets of pure copper, the production of which was a labour-intensive process.

The production of the single-use starter sheets involved laying down a sheet of copper by electrolysis on each side of a “mother plate”. Generating the sheet took a day, and thousands of sheets could be needed every day. Originally, the copper starter sheets were separated from the mother plate manually, but over time the process was automated. In addition, limitations associated with the use of copper starter sheets meant that it was difficult to meet the purity specifications of some new copper applications that were, in the 1970s and 1980s, demanding higher quality copper.

=== IsaKidd process ===
The development of the Isa Process tank house technology at CRL eliminated the whole process and cost of producing the starter sheets by using stainless-steel permanent cathodes. It also included substantial automation of the process of inserting the permanent cathodes into the electrolytic cells and their subsequent removal and stripping of the sheets of deposited cathode copper. The labour force required to operate a refinery using the IsaKidd technology has been estimated at 60–70% less of that required for refineries using starter sheets.

MIM Holdings began marketing the Isa Process technology in 1980, as a result of demand from other refinery operators.

Falconbridge subsequently independently developed a similar process to improve operations at its Kidd Creek copper refinery, near Timmins, Ontario. The initial development of permanent cathodes was for internal use, but marketing of the Kidd Process was initiated in 1992 after requests from other refinery operators.

The two technologies were brought together as the IsaKidd Technology in 2006, when Xstrata bought Falconbridge.

The IsaKidd Technology now dominates global copper refining. It has been licensed to 102 users and Xstrata Technology, which markets the technology, reports on its website a total installed capacity of some 12 million tonnes per year (“t/y”) of copper production, as of October 2011. This is about 60% of the estimated 2011 global refined copper production of 19.7 million tonnes.

The development of the IsaKidd technology allowed increased productivity, reduced operating costs and the production of consistent, high-quality cathode copper.

== History ==
Electrolytic refining of copper was first patented in England by James Elkington in 1865 and the first electrolytic copper refinery was built by Elkington in Burry Port, South Wales in 1869.

There were teething problems with the new technology. For example, the early refineries had trouble producing firm deposits on the cathodes. As a result, there was much secrecy between refinery operators as each strove to maintain a competitive edge.

The nature of the cathode used to collect the copper is a critical part of the technology. The properties of copper are highly susceptible to impurities. For example, an arsenic content of 0.1% can reduce the conductivity of copper by 23% and a bismuth content of just 0.001% makes copper brittle. The material used in the cathode must not contaminate the copper being deposited, or it will not meet the required specifications.

The current efficiency of the refining process depends, in part, on how close the anodes and cathodes can be placed in the electrolytic cell. This, in turn, depends on the straightness of both the anode and the cathode. Bumps and bends in either can lead to short-circuiting or otherwise affect the current distribution and also the quality of the cathode copper.

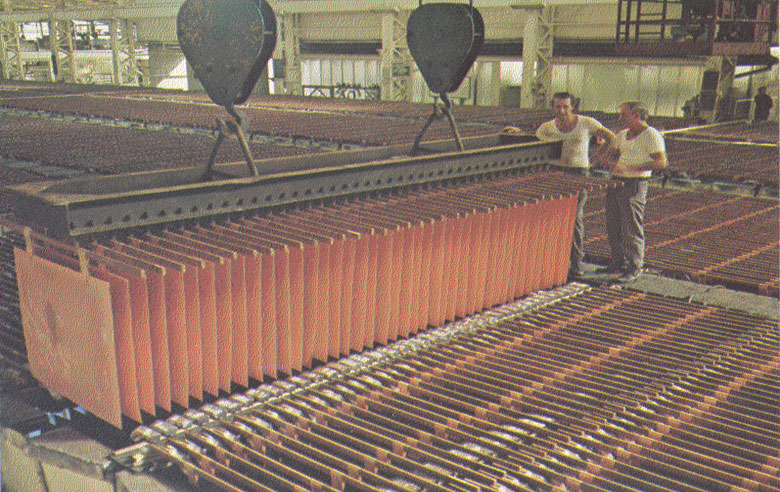
Figure 1. A crane carrying a rack of starter sheet cathode.

Prior to the development of the Isa Process technology, the standard approach was to use a starter sheet of high-purity copper as the initial cathode. These starter sheets are produced in special electrolytic cells by electrodeposition of copper for 24 hours onto a plate made of copper coated with oil (or treated with other similar face-separation materials) or of titanium. Thousands of sheets could be needed every day, and the original method of separating the starter sheet from the “mother plate” (referred to as “stripping”) was entirely manual.

Starter sheets are usually quite light. For example, the starter sheets used in the CRL refinery weighed 10 pounds (4.53 kilograms). Thus, they are thin and need to be handled carefully to avoid bending.

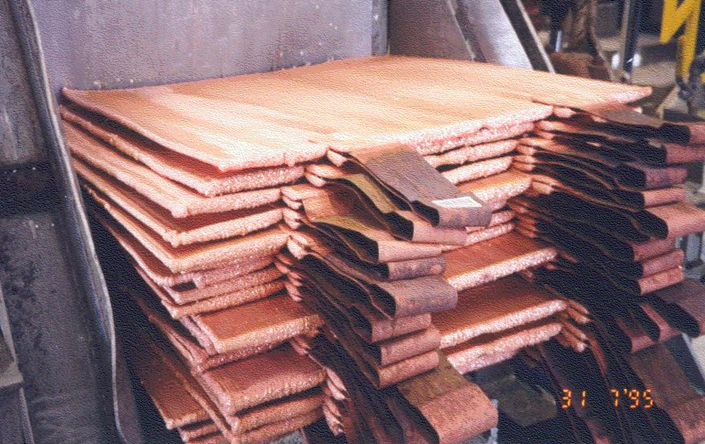
Figure 2. Cathode copper deposited on copper starter sheets.

Over time, the formation of starter sheets was improved by mechanisation, but there was still a high labour input.

Once the starter sheets were formed, they had to be flattened, to reduce the likelihood of short circuits, and then cut, formed and punched to make loops from which the starter sheets are hung from conductive copper hanger bars in the electrolytic cells (see Figure 1).

The starter sheets are inserted in the refining cells and dissolved copper electrodeposits on them to produce the cathode copper product (see Figure 2). Because of the manufacturing cost of the starter sheets, refineries using them tend to keep them in the cells as long as possible, usually 12–14 days. On the other hand, the anodes normally reside in the cells for 24–28 days, meaning that there are two cathodes produced from each anode.

The starter sheets have a tendency to warp, due to the mechanical stresses they encounter and often need to be removed from the refining cells after about two days to be straightened in presses before being returned to the cells. The tendency to warp leads to frequent short-circuiting.

Due to their limitations, it is difficult for copper produced on starter sheets to meet modern specifications for the highest-purity copper.

=== The development of the Isa Process technology ===
The development of the Isa Process tank house technology had its beginning in the zinc industry. During the mid-1970s, MIM Holdings Limited (“MIM”) was considering building a zinc refinery in Townsville to treat the zinc concentrate produced by its Mount Isa operations. As a result, MIM staff visited the zinc smelters using the best-practice technology and found that modern electrolytic zinc smelters had adopted permanent cathode plate and mechanised stripping technology.

MIM recognised that the performance of traditional copper refineries was constrained by the poor cathode geometry inherent in using copper starter sheets.

MIM then developed a research program aimed at developing similar permanent cathode technology for copper refining. CRL had been operating in Townsville since 1959, using conventional starter-sheet technology and treating blister copper produced in the Mount Isa Mines Limited copper smelter at Mount Isa in Queensland. CRL incorporated the permanent cathode technology in its 1978 refinery modernisation project. The material initially selected was 316L stainless steel, stitch-welded to a 304L stainless-steel hanger bar. The hanger-bar assembly was then electroplated with copper to a thickness of 1.3 millimeters (“mm”) (later increased to 2.5 mm and then 3.0 mm to improve the corrosion resistance of the hanger bar) to approximately 15 mm down onto the blade, which provided sufficient electrical conductivity and gave the assembly some corrosion resistance.

Electrodeposited copper adheres quite firmly to the stainless steel so that it does not detach during refining. The vertical edges of the stainless steel plates are covered with tight-fitting polymer edge strips to prevent copper depositing around the edge of the cathode plate and so make it easier to strip the cathode copper from them. The bottom of the cathode plates were masked with a thin film of wax, again to prevent the copper depositing around the bottom edge. Wax was used rather than an edge strip to avoid having a ledge that would collect falling anode slimes and contaminate the cathode copper.

Wax was also used on the vertical edges to prolong the life of the vertical edge strip.

The original cathode stripping machine was based on that used at the Hikoshima plant of the Mitsui Mining and Smelting Company of Japan. However, considerable development work was necessary to modify the design to handle the copper cathodes, which were heavier than those at Hikoshima, and to process the cathode plates without damaging them. The machines also had to be redesigned to allow for waxing the sides and bottoms of the cathode plates to allow the next copper cathode sheets to be removed easily.

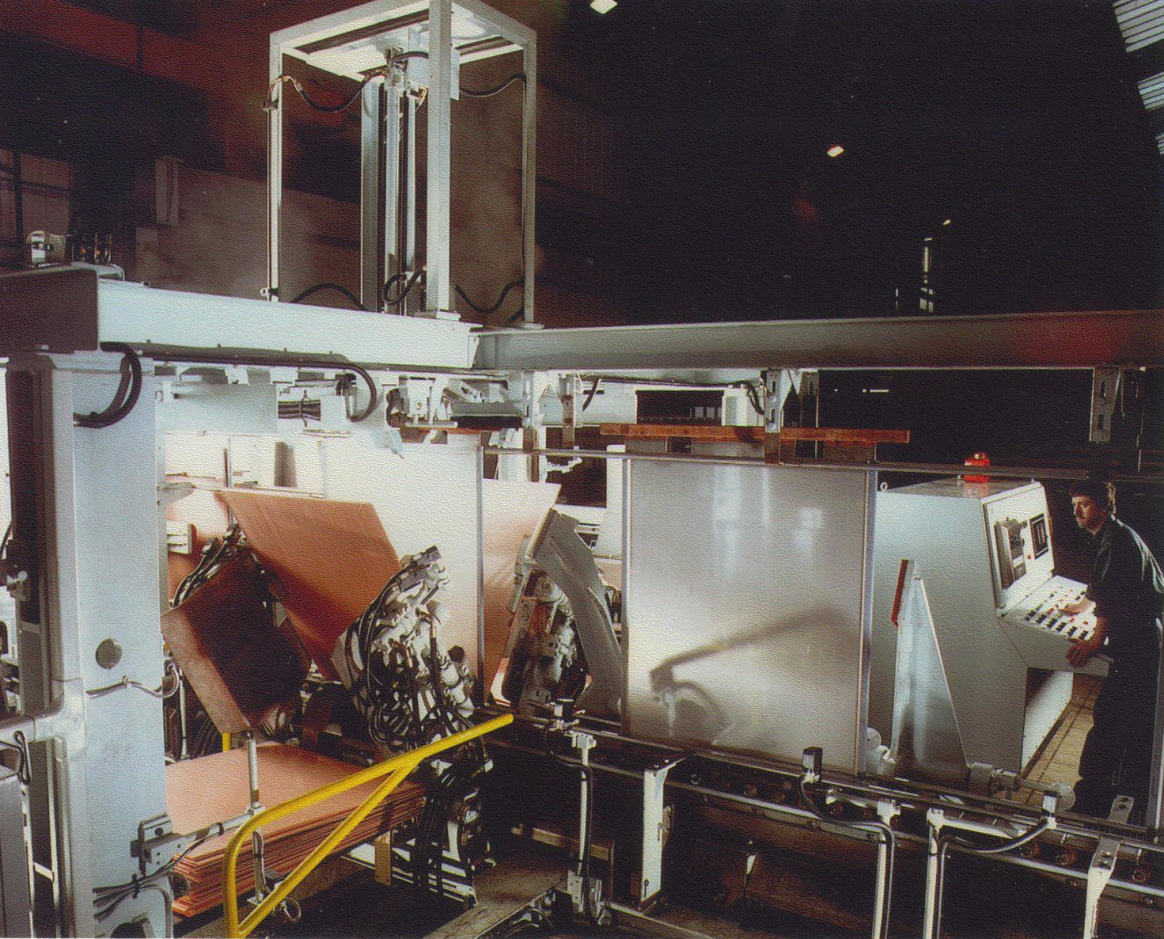
Figure 3. An IsaProcess automated cathode stripping machine.

The stripping machines included receiving and discharge conveyors, washing, separation, cathode stacking and discharging, cathode plate separation for refurbishing, and the wax applications for the sides and bottoms of the cathode plates.

The original CRL stripping machine had the capability of stripping 250 cathode plates per hour.

The lower cost of the cathode plates compared to starter sheets means that shorter cathode cycle times are possible. The cycle time can range from 5 to 14 days, but a seven-day cathode cycle is common. This shorter cycle time improves current efficiency as less short circuits occur and there is less nodulation of the cathode surface.

Initially, other refinery operators regarded the developments at CRL with scepticism. Stainless steel had been tried unsuccessfully as mother-plate material for copper starter sheets. They suffered from rapid deterioration of their strippability, resulting in “an almost daily increase in difficulty of stripping”. However, following the success of early installations in Townsville, Timmins, and many other places, the permanent stainless steel cathode technology has had widespread introduction.

=== Moving into electrowinning plants ===
The Isa Process was originally developed for the CRL copper electrorefinery in Townsville. It was subsequently licensed to the Copper Range Company for its White Pine copper refinery.

The next licence issued was for an electrowinning application at the Broken Hill Associated Smelters (“BHAS”) lead smelter at Port Pirie, in South Australia. BHAS commissioned in 1985 a solvent extraction and electrowinning (“SX–EW”) to recover copper from copper–lead matte produced as a by-product of the lead smelting operations. The process used involves leaching the copper from the material using an acidic chloride–sulfate solution, followed by solvent extraction to concentrate the leached copper and electrowinning.

Electrowinning copper differs from electrorefining in that electrorefining uses a copper anode that is dissolved and redeposited on the cathode, while in electrowinning the copper is already in solution and is extracted from the solution by passing a current through the solution using an inert lead-alloy anode, and a cathode.

The chloride in the leach solution at Port Pirie proved to be a problem for the stainless steel cathodes of the Isa Process. A small amount of the chloride ions in the leach solution passed through the solvent into the electrolyte, leading to a reported chloride concentration of 80 milligrams per liter (“mg/L”) in the electrolyte. The presence of the chloride in the electrolyte caused pitting corrosion of the stainless steel cathode plates. After trying other types of stainless steel, BHAS switched to using titanium cathode plates.

Other electrowinning operations followed, including Gibraltar Mines’ McLeese Lake operation and Magma Copper’s San Manuel copper mine in 1986, the Mexicana de Cananea operation in Mexico in 1989, and the Gunpowder Copper Limited operation at Gunpowder in north-west Queensland 1990. These operations did not suffer the chloride corrosion problems experienced by BHAS.

=== The development of the Kidd Process technology ===
Falconbridge Nickel Mines in mid-1981 commissioned a copper smelter and refinery near Timmins, Ontario, to treat concentrate from its Kidd Mine. However, at the outset, the quality of the cathode copper produced in the Kidd refinery suffered from the presence of higher than usual concentrations of lead and selenium in the copper smelter’s anodes. Kidd cathode copper was not able to meet its customers’ specifications and obtaining product certification for the London Metal Exchange (“LME”) became a key focus.

After several process improvements were instigated, it was ultimately realised that the use of copper starter sheets was preventing the Kidd refinery meeting its cathode quality targets. Test work then began on the use of permanent stainless-steel cathodes. Preliminary tests using full-scale titanium blanks showed a reduction in the lead content of the cathode copper of a factor of four and a six-fold reduction in the selenium content, compared with the use of copper starter sheets.

The focus then shifted to developing a stripping machine, to develop stainless steel cathodes incorporating the existing header bars and evaluating edge-strip technology. The company’s board of directors gave approval for the conversion of the refinery to the Kidd technology in April 1985. The conversion was completed in 1986 and the Kidd refinery became the third to install permanent cathode and automated stripping technology.

Falconbridge began marketing the technology in 1992, after many requests from other refinery operators. Thus, the Kidd Process created competition between two suppliers of permanent cathode technology. The main differences between them were the cathode header bar, edge stripping and the stripping machine technology.

In contrast to the stainless steel header bar then used in the Isa Process cathode, the Kidd Process cathode used a solid copper header bar, which was welded onto the stainless steel sheet. This gave a lower voltage drop (by 8–10 millivolts) than the Isa Process cathode.

The Isa Process technology used the waxed edge at the bottom of the cathode plate to stop the copper depositing around the plate’s bottom to form a single mass of copper running from the top of one side of the cathode plate around the bottom to the top of the other side. The copper was stripped from the cathode plates as two separate sheets. The Kidd Process technology did not use wax, as it was thought that it could exacerbate the impurity problems with which the plant had been struggling. At Kidd, the stripping approach was to remove the copper from the cathode plate as a single V-shaped cathode product, akin to a taco shell.

The Kidd Process initially used a “carousel” stripping machine, but a linear installation was subsequently developed to provide machines with lower to medium stripping capacities for electrowinning plants and smaller refineries. The linear stripping machines, first installed in 1996, were more compact, less complex and had lower installation costs than the carousel machines.

=== New advances ===
==== Waxless cathode plates ====
As outlined above, the Kidd Process did not use wax on its permanent cathodes. This highlighted disadvantages associated with the use of wax by the Isa Process. Cathode copper consumers applied pressure to producers to remove residual wax from the cathode copper, and the use of wax also created “housekeeping” problems for Isa Process operators.

Consequently, MIM commenced a development program in 1997 aimed at eliminating the use of wax. This resulted in a new process called the Isa 2000 technology, which was able to produce single-sheet cathode (as opposed to the Kidd taco shell cathode) without using wax.

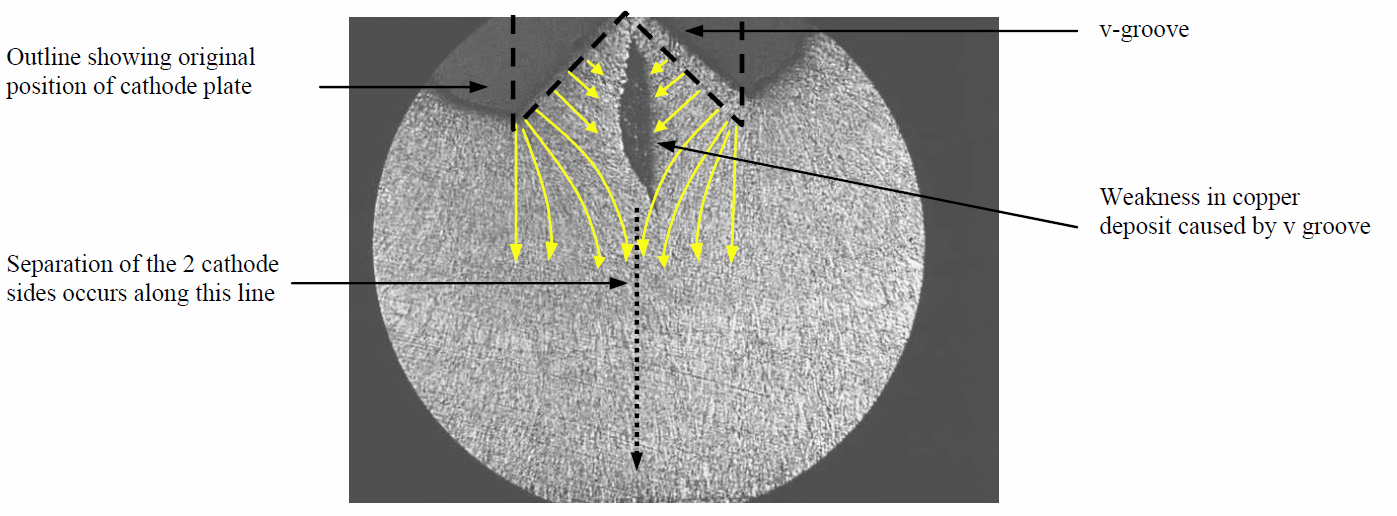
Figure 4. Effect of the V-groove at the bottom edge of the cathode starting plate on the deposited cathode copper.

This was achieved by machining a 90° “V”-groove into the bottom edge of the cathode. The groove weakens the structure of the copper growing at the bottom edge of the cathode plate because the copper crystals grow perpendicular to the cathode plate from opposite sides of the groove, causing them to intersect at right angles to each other. A discontinuity in the structure is formed at the intersection that results in a weak zone, along which the copper splits during stripping.

Figure 4 is a microscope view of the cross-section a copper cathode growing at the tip of a cathode plate. The yellow lines show the orientation and direction of crystal growth.

==== Low-resistance cathodes ====
The standard Isa Process cathodes have slightly higher electrical resistance than solid-copper hanger bar systems used by the Kidd Process, meaning that there is a higher power cost. However, this cost is offset by greater reliability and predictability in the increase in resistance over time, allowing for maintenance planning.

The solid-copper hanger bars, on the other hand, lose electrical performance over a shorter period of time due to corrosive attack on the joint and sudden failure is possible. The maintenance costs of such systems are greater and less predictable. A trial of approximately 3000 solid-copper hanger bars, found over time a lower current efficiency in the solid-copper hanger bars of about 2.4%.

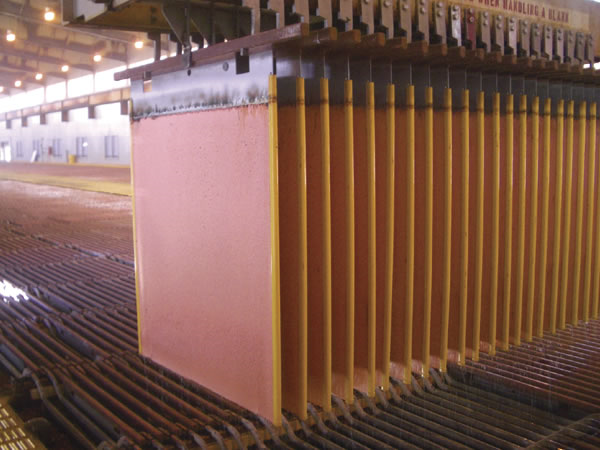
Figure 5. IsaKidd BR cathode plates.

The MIM development team looked for other ways to reduce the resistance of the cathode plates and developed a new low-resistance cathode, which it called ISA Cathode BR. This new design extended the copper plating from 15–17 mm down the blade to approximately 55 mm, and it increased the thickness of the copper to 3.0 mm from the 2.5 mm used on the standard cathode.

The new cathode plate design was tested in the CRL refinery in Townsville and at Compania Minera Zaldivar in Chile. The Chilean results indicated the new cathode design had the potential to reduce power costs by approximately US$100,000 in 2003 for the plant, compared to using conventional Isa Process cathode designs.

==== Lower-cost stainless steel cathode plates ====
From 2001 to 2007, nickel prices rose from an average of US$5945 to US$37,216. Nickel is a key constituent of 316L stainless steel. This, combined with increases in some of the other constituents of the 316L alloy, prompted Xstrata Technology (by then the marketing organisation for the Isa Process technology) to seek an alternative material for the cathode plates.

Xstrata Technology personnel investigated the use of a new low-alloyed duplex stainless steel, LDX 2101 and 304L stainless steel. The LDX 2101 contains 1.5% nickel compared to 10–14% in 316L stainless steel.

LDX 2101 has superior mechanical strength to the 316L stainless steel, allowing thinner sheets to be used for the cathode plates. However, the flatness tolerance of commercially available LDX 2101 steel did not meet the required specifications. Xstrata Technology worked with a manufacturer to produce sheets that did meet the required flatness tolerance.

Xstrata Technology also had to develop a finish that allowed the surface to function in the same way as 316L.

Cathode plates using LDX 2010 have equivalent corrosion resistance to 316L plates.

The LDX 2101 alloy provides an alternative to the 316L stainless steel, with the selection depending on relatively prices of the various steels.

==== High corrosion resistance ====
The Kidd Process development team modified its cathode plates to cope with high-corrosion environments, such as the liberator cells used to remove contaminants in refineries and some high-corrosion environments in electrowinning plants.

The design of the plate features a stainless-steel jacket that surrounds a solid-copper hanger bar, protecting it from corrosion. A corrosion-resistant resin inside the stainless steel jacket protects the conductive interior weld between the header bar and the plate. The hanger bar is then finished with high-quality sealing to prevent ingress of electrolytes into the conductive interior weld.

This corrosion resistance electrode is marketed as the HP cathode plate.

==== The Kidd Process High Capacity Linear Machine ====
After the initial carousel stripping machine development and the later development of the linear stripping machine, Falconbridge personnel developed the Kidd Process High Capacity Linear Machine (“HCLM”). This machine included a loading and unloading system that was based on robotics.

The new design improved, among other things, the discharge area of the stripper. This had been a problem area for the carousel stripping machines, in which copper released from the cathode plate fell into an envelope and was then transferred to a material handling device. Copper that misbehaved and failed to transfer often required manual intervention. The new robot discharge system eliminated the free falling of the copper and physically transferred the released copper to the discharge location.

=== The birth of the combined IsaKidd technology ===
After Falconbridge’s 1992 decision to market the Kidd technology, the Falconbridge and the then MIM Process Technologies groups competed for the tank house technology market. Between 1992 and 2006, 25 Kidd technology licences were sold, while there were 52 Isa process licences sold in the same period.

Xstrata plc (now Glencore) took over MIM Holdings in 2003. The Isa Process technology continued to be developed and marketed by Xstrata Technology. Xstrata subsequently took over Falconbridge in 2006. The Kidd Process technology consequently became part of the Xstrata Technology tank house package and together they began to be marketed as IsaKidd, a name that represents the dual heritage of the technology.

The result has been a technology package that combined what were mutually regarded as the best of both versions. This combination led to the development of new stripping systems and new cathode designs are in development.

The variation in copper deposits on the cathode plates was one of the difficulties encountered with the earlier stripping machines. Areas of thin copper on the cathode plates, which are caused by short circuits, are difficult to separate from the stainless steel plate due to their lack of rigidity. Plates bearing such areas generally had to be rejected from the stripping machine and stripped manually. Similarly, sticky copper deposits (generally related to poor surface condition on the cathode plate, such as corroded surfaces or improper mechanical treatment), heavily nodulated cathode and laminated copper caused problems for stripping.

Stripping machine development focussed on developing a device that could be seen as a more accommodating and universal stripping machine that could handle cathode plates with problem copper deposits without rejecting them or slowing the stripping rate.

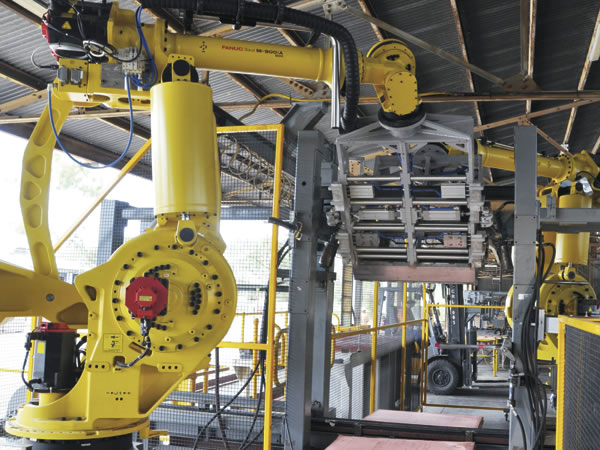
Figure 6. An IsaKidd robotic cathode stripping machine.

The result of this work was a new robotic cathode stripping machine. It incorporated the following features:

- a stripping wedge that starts removing the copper from the top of the cathode plate and moves down to the bottom
- guides to support the copper during the downwards motion to ensure that the copper does not strip prematurely
- rollers designed to reduce the friction between the copper, the cathode plate and the wedge during the downward motion of the wedge
- grippers that clamp the copper before it is pulled away from the cathode plate.

The stripping wedges are mounted on two robotic arms, one for each side of the cathode plate. These arms strip the copper from the plate and lay the sheets of cathode copper onto conveyors for them to be taken away for bundling.

== Advantages of the IsaKidd Technology ==
Advantages cited for the IsaKidd technology include:

- long life – the operational life of the permanent cathodes without repair is said to be over seven years under correct operating conditions for electrowinning applications and over 15 years for electrorefining applications
- reduced labour costs – due to the elimination of the starter-sheet production process and the automation of cathode stripping. The average labour requirement for refineries based on the IsaKidd technology is 0.9 man-hours per tonne of cathode, compared to 2.4 man-hours/t for tank houses using starter sheets. Atlantic Copper personnel reported a figure of 0.43 man-hours/t for the Huelva refinery in Spain in 1998
- no suspension loops – the suspension loops of starter sheets can corrode and thus cause cutting of the electrolytic cell liners. The lack of suspension loops also makes crane handling easier
- improved cathode quality – due to the straight cathode plates, which eliminates short-circuiting, and the lack of bends and other surface irregularities reduces the capture of contaminants such as floating arsenic, antimony and bismuth and other slimes compounds. The elimination of the starter-sheet suspension loops also improved cathode quality. In SX–EW operations, the use of stainless-steel cathode plates eliminates lead flakes and other debris from the cathode copper.
- improved current efficiency – this arises both from eliminating short circuits caused by bent and irregular electrodes and from the shorter cathode cycles possible with the use of the reusable cathode plates. Current efficiencies of over 98% are claimed
- increased refining intensity – this reduces the number of electrolytic cells needed in a refinery and its capital cost because the gap between the anodes and the cathodes can be narrower due to the lower risk of short circuits and because the current density can be increased, making the refining process faster. Refineries operating with the IsaKidd technology can achieve current densities of 330 amperes per square meter (“A/m^{2}”) of cathode area, whereas a refinery using starter sheets can only operate at around 240 A/m^{2}
- shorter cathode cycles – shorter cathode cycles are possible using the IsaKidd technology, which reduces the metal inventory and means that the refinery or SX–EW operator is paid more quickly
- shorter anode cycles – the higher intensity of the refining also results in about a 12% reduction in anode cycle time, also reducing the metal inventory

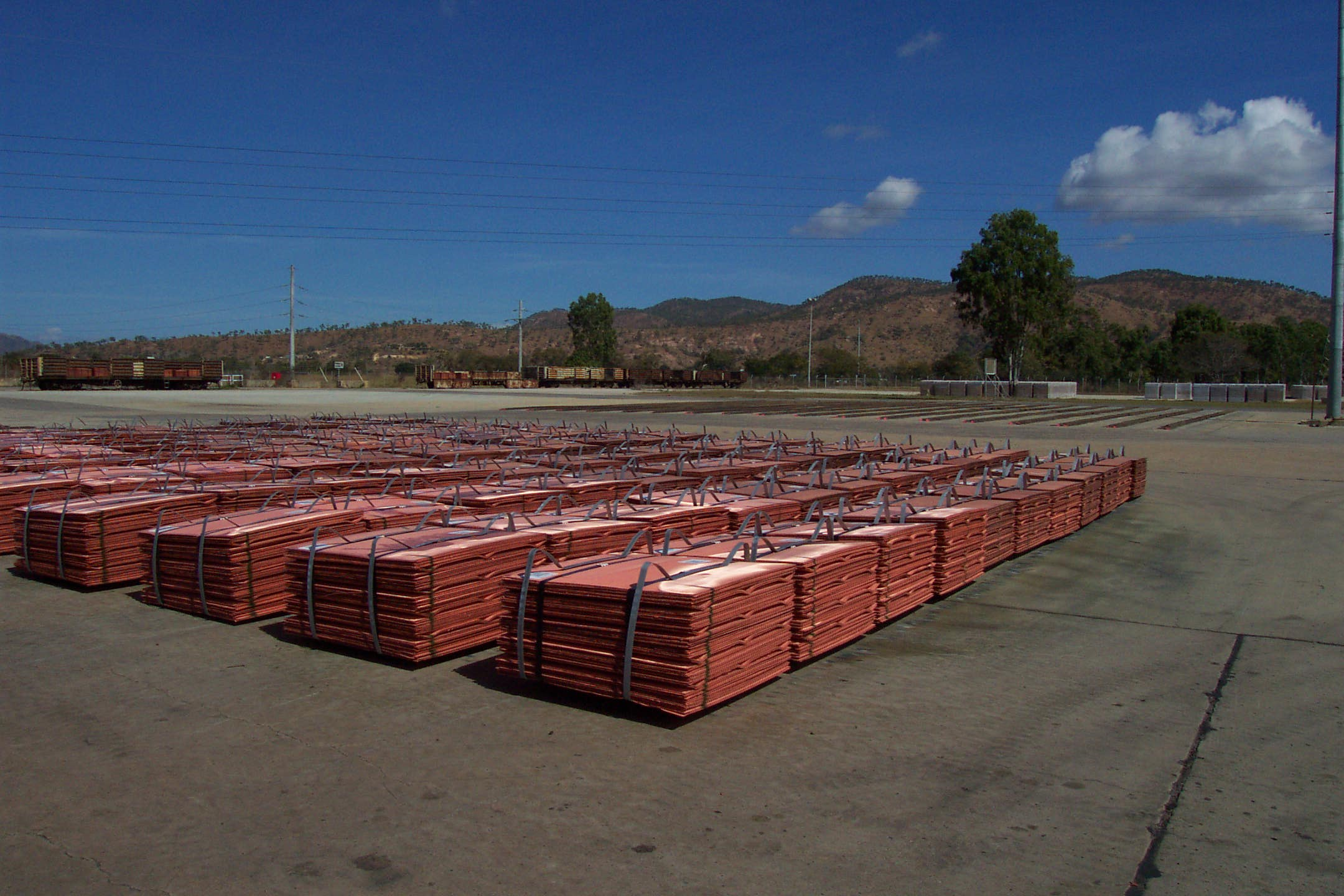
Figure 7. Cathode copper bundles strapped for transport to market.

- uniform cathode copper sheets for ease of transport – the control over the dimensions of the copper sheets made possible by the IsaKidd technology, provides uniform cathode bundles that can be securely strapped and easily transported (see Figure 7)
- improved safety – elimination of much of the manual handling leads to improved safety conditions in the workplace.

Staff of the Cyprus Miami copper refinery wrote after their installation of the Isa Process technology that: “It is now well proven that tankhouses applying stainless steel cathode technology can consistently produce high quality cathodes while operating at higher cathode current density and at a lower cathode spacing than those used in conventional tankhouses.”
