= MIM Holdings =

Former Australian mining company

MIM Holdings Limited was an Australian mining company founded in 1970 as the parent company of Mount Isa Mines, which operates the Mount Isa mines in north-west Queensland.

Based in Ann Street, Brisbane, MIM Holdings owned and/or operated coal, gold, and base metal mines in Australia and Argentina. It also operated lead and copper smelters in Mount Isa, a copper refinery in Townsville (Queensland), a lead refinery at Northfleet (England), zinc smelters using the Imperial Smelting Process at the National Smelting Company located within Avonmouth Docks (England) and Duisburg (Germany), and a precious metals refinery in Sydney. In the early 1980s, it was briefly Australia's largest company by market capitalisation.

It also held, at some stages, cross-shareholdings in ASARCO, Cominco and Metallgesellschaft. It sold its interests in Cominco and Metallgesellschaft during the 1993–1994 Australian financial year.

MIM Holdings was responsible for several significant technological advances in the mining industry, including the Isa Process tank house technology, developed at its subsidiary Copper Refineries Pty Ltd in Townsville; the Bottom-blown oxygen converter developed at its lead refining subsidiary, Britannia Refined Metals, at Northfleet in England; and the ISASMELT top-entry submerged lance smelting process, Jameson Cell flotation technology, and the IsaMill fine grinding technology, all developed at its Mount Isa Mines Limited operations in Mount Isa.

MIM Holdings was taken over by Xstrata for a total of US$2.96 billion in 2003 and delisted from the Australian Securities Exchange on 30 June 2003. At that time, MIM Holdings was one of the world's biggest coal exporters.
