= Jameson cell =

Machinery for processing minerals

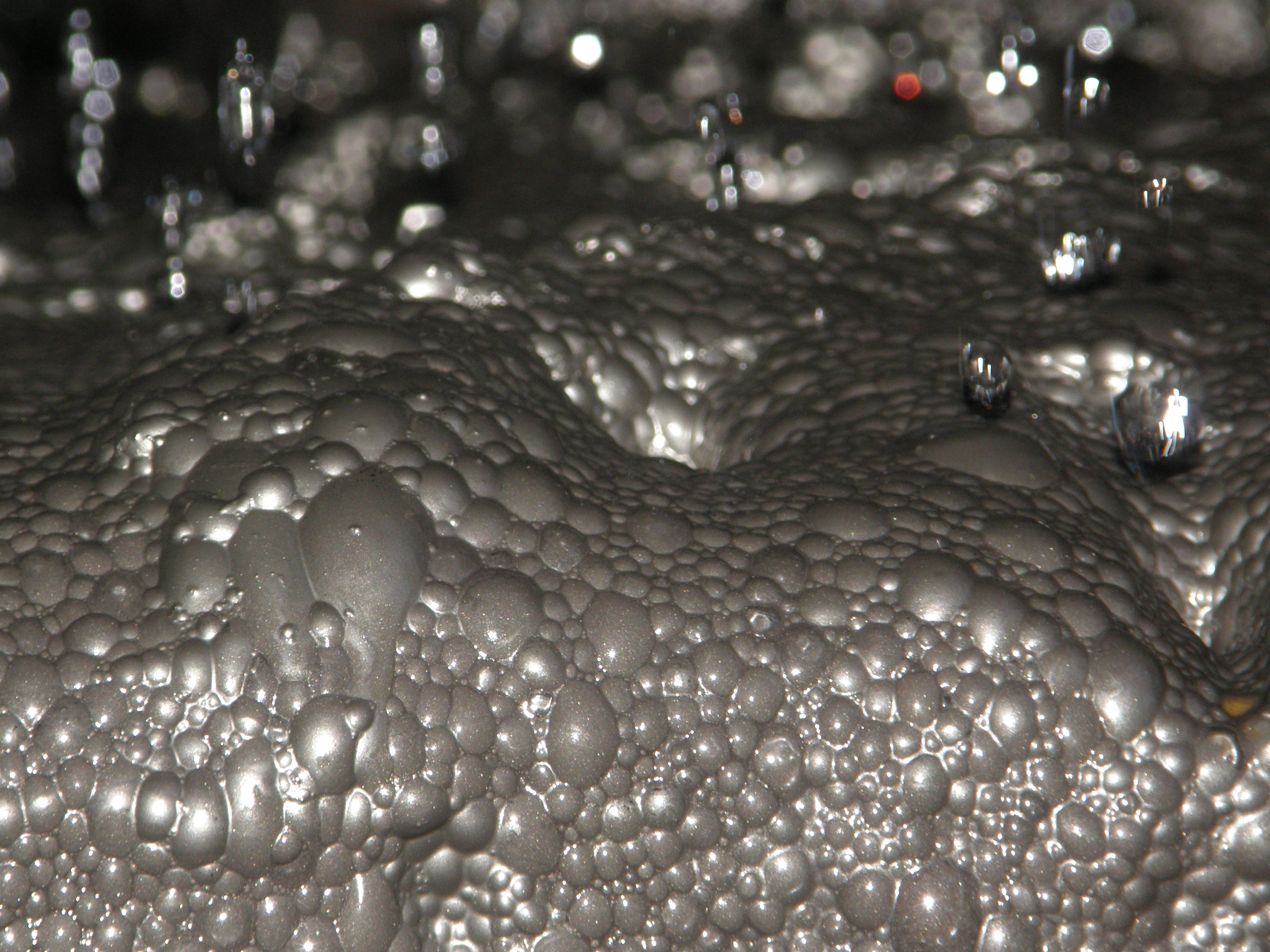
Copper-sulfide-loaded air bubbles on a Jameson Cell at the flotation plant of the Prominent Hill mine in South Australia

The Jameson Cell is a high-intensity froth flotation cell that was invented by Laureate Professor Graeme Jameson of the University of Newcastle and developed in conjunction with Mount Isa Mines (MIM), a subsidiary of MIM Holdings and now part of Glencore.

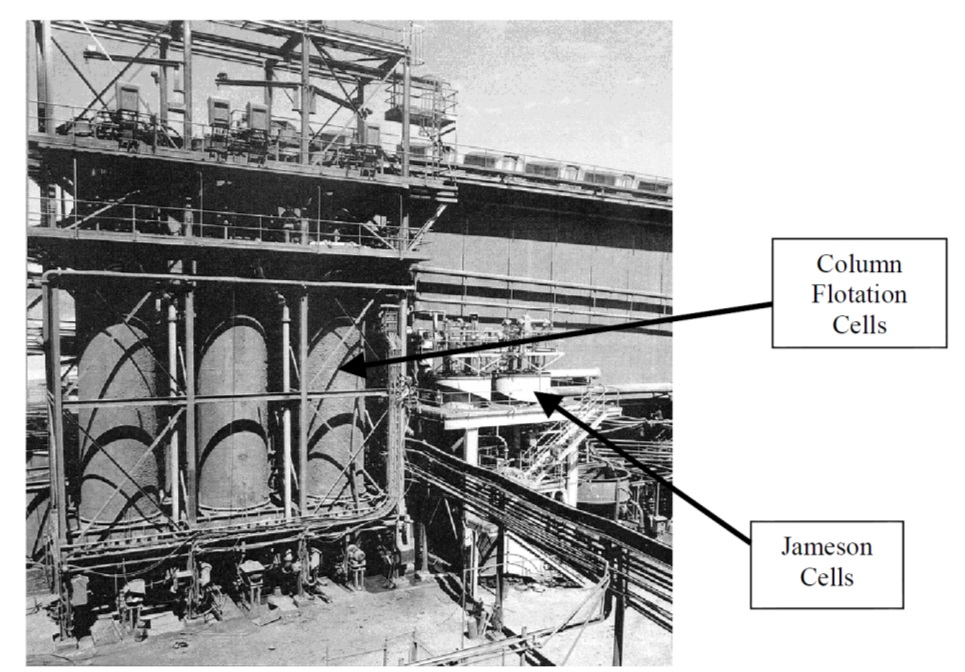
Figure 1. Comparison of the sizes of conventional column flotation cells and Jameson Cells with similar capacities.

The high intensity of the Jameson Cell means that it is much shorter than conventional column flotation cells (see Figure 1), and it does not require air compressors to aerate the suspension of ground ore particles and water (known as a slurry or pulp) in the flotation cell. The lack of a requirement for compressed air and the lack of moving parts means that power consumption is less than for the equivalent mechanical or conventional column flotation cell.

In contrast to most types of flotation cell, the Cell introduces the feed and the air to the Cell in a combined stream via one or more cylindrical columns referred to as "downcomers". Other types of flotation cell typically introduce the feed and the air separately to the cell.

The Cell produces fast mineral flotation rates, especially for very fine mineral particles. It produces high concentrate grades from fast floating liberated particles and is able to do this from a single stage of flotation. The high carrying capacity of the Jameson Cell is particularly beneficial when high yields (mass pulls) are required, such as in recleaning in metals flotation and in the flotation of metallurgical coal, where yields can exceed 80%.

The Cell was initially developed as a lower-cost alternative to conventional column flotation cells for recovering fine particles, and was first used in the Mount Isa lead–zinc concentrator in 1988. Since then, use of the technology has spread to include coal flotation, base and precious metal flotation, potash flotation, oil sands flotation, molybdenum flotation, graphite flotation and cleaning solvent extraction liquors. Xstrata Technology, Glencore Xstrata's technology marketing arm, listed 328 Jameson Cell installations in May 2013. Cells have been installed by 94 companies in 27 countries. Today, the technology is the standard in the Australian Coal Industry where well over one hundred Cells have been installed to recover coal fines. It is mainly used in metals applications to solve final grade and capacity issues from conventional cell cleaner circuits. It has found a niche in transforming traditional circuit designs where its inclusion allows cleaner circuits to be designed with fewer cells in a smaller footprint, while achieving cleaner and/or higher grade concentrates. It has also made possible the recovery of previously discarded fine materials, such as coal and phosphate fines, thereby increasing the efficiency and extending the life of the world's non-renewable natural resources.

== Operating principles ==
Froth flotation is achieved by mixing chemicals known as collectors with the ore slurry. The collectors adsorb onto the surfaces of the particles of select minerals (usually the valuable mineral that is targeted for concentration), making these minerals hydrophobic. Air is passed through the slurry in a tank known as a flotation cell. The air is broken into tiny bubbles by various mechanisms (depending on the design of the flotation cell), and the now-hydrophobic minerals attach to the bubbles, rising with them to the surface of the flotation cell, where they form a froth. The froth flows over the top edge (or "lip") of the flotation cell and forms the flotation concentrate. Ideally, none of the unwanted mineral particles float, and they remain behind as the flotation tailings.

However, the selectivity of the collection mechanism is not perfect. Some unwanted ("gangue") minerals are also carried into the froth, largely by entrainment with the water rising with the bubbles. This is particularly the case for particles less than 10 μm in size. Some of the gangue particles follow the water between the bubbles as it drains back to the underlying pulp. This process can be assisted by the application of sufficient "wash water" to the froth to displace the water entrained with the bubbles and the fine gangue particles brought with them. Column flotation cells, invented in Canada by Boutin and Tremblay in 1961, grew increasingly popular in the 1980s and 1990s as a way of reducing entrainment of fine gangue particles during "cleaning" of flotation concentrates. With heights usually between 6 and 14 meters, they could have froth depths up to 2 m, providing more residence time than conventional cells and more stable froth surfaces that enable better froth washing.

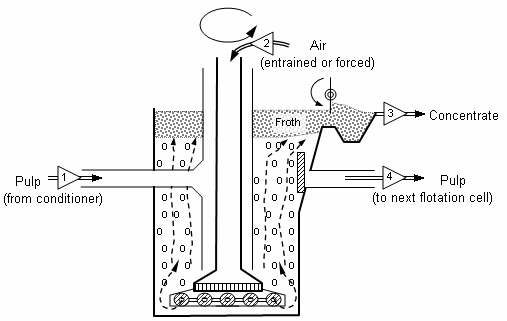
Figure 2. A schematic diagram illustrating the operating principles of a conventional, mechanically agitated flotation cell.

Froth flotation efficiency is determined by a series of probabilities: those of particle–bubble contact, particle–bubble attachment, transport between the pulp and the froth, and froth collection into the product launder.

In a conventional mechanically agitated cell, the void fraction is low (5–10%) and the bubble size is large (2–3 mm), which results in a low interfacial area with a low probability of particle–bubble contact. In a conventional flotation column, the void fraction is similarly low, and so the probability of particle–bubble contact is increased by increasing the height of the column to provide greater residence time.

Traditionally, the ore slurry and the air are introduced separately to the flotation cell (see Figure 2). The Jameson Cell differs from this traditional approach by mixing the slurry with the air in the downcomers.

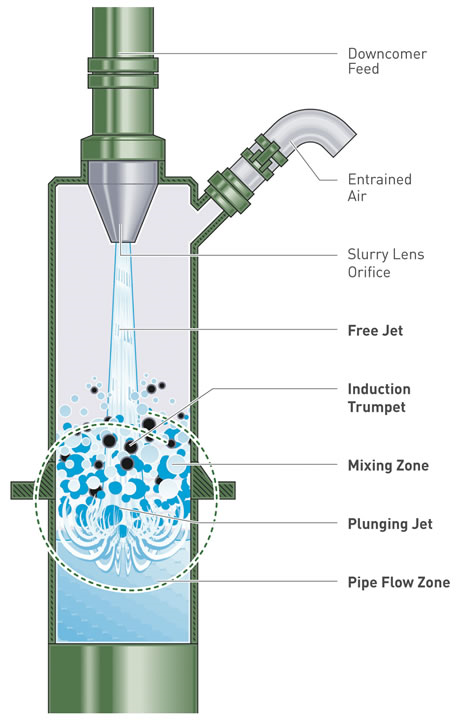
Figure 3. The Jameson Cell downcomer.

The slurry is introduced at the top of the downcomer as a jet that draws in air through a second pipe to form a stable two-phase mixture (see Figure 3). The plunging slurry jet shears and then entrains the air. The target minerals, with their collector-coated surfaces, attach to the bubbles and this mixture travels down the downcomer, driven by hydrostatic forces, before it is discharged into the tank portion of the Jameson Cell (see Figure 4). The downcomer is designed to provide high-intensity mixing of the air and the slurry to generate a dense foam of fine bubbles and maximise the contact between the target mineral particles and the bubbles. The probability of particle–bubble contact is "virtually 100%" with a slurry residence time in the downcomer of 5–10 seconds.

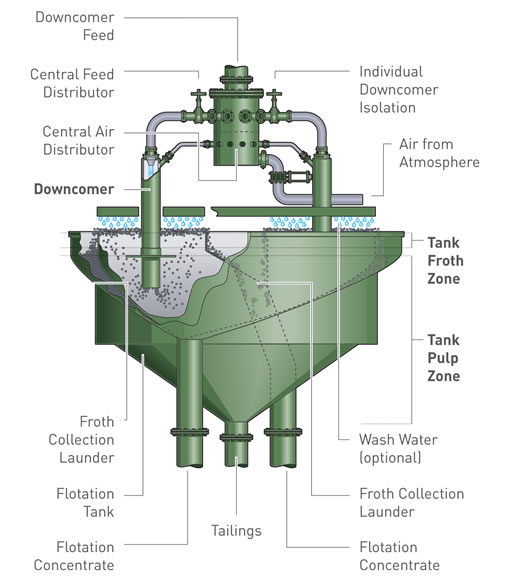
Figure 4. A cut-away drawing showing a typical Jameson Cell design.

The high probability of particle–bubble contact, and subsequent short residence times (five to ten seconds in the downcomer, allows for a much more compact column design than conventional column flotation cells (see Figure 1). The fine nature of the bubbles (0.3 to 0.5 mm in diameter) gives them enhanced carrying capabilities for fine mineral particles. Fine bubbles also improve the separation of minerals, as they intensify the difference in the flotation kinetics of the valuable minerals from the gangue minerals, thus allowing higher grade concentrates to be produced.

The foam in the downcomer is about 50–60% air. Because of this, the pulp is distributed in the form of thin interfacial slurry films between the bubbles, providing an ideal environment for particle–bubble contact. Collection occurs by migration of the particles within the thin films, which are not much thicker than the diameter of the particles.

The best collection occurs when the volume of air roughly equals that of the injected slurry.

The Cell is operated by initially closing the air inlet at the top of the downcomer and feeding the flotation pulp in through the nozzle. The air in the downcomer is entrained in the pulp, creating a partial vacuum that draws pulp from the tank up into the downcomer. The pulp level quickly reaches the nozzle, which is at a level above that of the liquid level in the tank. This creates a hydrostatic head in the downcomer, meaning that the pressure inside the top of the downcomer is lower than the atmospheric pressure. When the inlet is opened, air is drawn into the top space of the downcomer by this lower pressure, where it too is entrained into the downcomer contents by the plunging jet. At the same time, a downward flow is established in the pulp in the downcomer that is sufficient to counter the buoyancy of the bubbles, and the aerated pulp discharges into the tank.

Once in the tank, the wider cross sectional area of the tank reduces the downward superficial velocity of the mixture, allowing mineral-laden bubbles to disengage from the liquid and rise to the surface as they would in a conventional cell, where they form the froth. The velocity of the mixture discharging into the tank, and the large density differential between it and the remainder of the pulp in the tank, results in recirculating fluid patterns that keep the particles in the tank in suspension without requiring mechanical agitation.

The purpose of the tank is simply for bubble–pulp separation, so the volume of the tank is small compared with alternative technologies.

The froth that forms at the top of the tank flows over its lip to be collected. This froth can be "washed" by a light flow of water, if desired. The bubbles flowing over the lip of the cell are smaller in diameter than those that flow over the lip of conventional flotation columns.

The non-floating tailings are discharged through a hole in the bottom of the tank.

The Cell has no moving parts and no requirement for compressed air or sparging mechanisms. This results in lower power consumption than the equivalent mechanical or column flotation cells. Maintenance costs are also lower because the only wearing part is the slurry lens used to create the jet in the downcomer.

== History ==
The Jameson Cell grew out of a long-term research program aimed at improving the recovery of fine particles by flotation. The work started at Imperial College London, and continued when Jameson moved in 1978 to the University of Newcastle, NSW, Australia, where he is Laureate Professor (2015).

=== Academic research (1969–1990) ===
Jameson's research into flotation began when he was at Imperial College London, in 1969. A colleague, Dr J. A. Kitchener of the Royal School of Mines, pointed out that many of the new mineral deposits being found around the world required fine grinding to separate the valuable particles from the rock in which they were embedded, and the flotation technologies available at the time were relatively inefficient for recovering fine particles. Kitchener felt that improvements could best be achieved by an increased knowledge of the physics of flotation, rather than the chemistry of the reagents. Jameson had gained some expertise in the properties of bubbles and particles in suspensions whilst a PhD student at Cambridge. He began research into the fluid mechanics of the flotation process and set in train a series of experimental projects into the effect of particle diameter and bubble size on the flotation rate constant. Much of the research was conducted by honours students in chemical engineering. Jameson accepted the challenge of coming up with practical solutions to remedy the situation, if these could be identified.

Jameson's research showed that the kinetics of flotation of fine particles was a strong function of the bubble diameter and that the way to improve recoveries was to use small bubbles in the order of 300 microns (μm) in diameter. What was needed was a practical method of making such bubbles in large quantities, of the order of billions per second. The device needed to be simple to construct and operate, capable of running for long periods with minimal maintenance, and should be resistant to blockage by stray large particles in the feed. He began to look at the theory of bubble breakup in sheared flows, that is, in flow fields in which layers of liquid slide over each other. Lewis and Davidson had recently published a theory to predict the maximum size of bubbles in a well-characterised flow environment. By balancing the forces acting on a bubble in a shearing flow, including the disruptive dynamic stresses from the liquid motion and the restoring force of surface tension, it was possible to predict the critical shear rate required to produce a bubble of given size. Jameson then looked for simple and practical ways of generating the required shear rates, and found inspiration in the kitchen sink. If a jet of water from a tap plunges into a basin full of water, a shear layer develops around the jet, that entrains air from the atmosphere into the water, and at the same time, breaks up the entrained air into fine bubbles. The effect is magnified if there is a detergent in the water. Detergents, known as frothers, are used in flotation to prevent bubble coalescence, and to create stable froths. By the correct choice of jet velocity and diameter, it is possible to provide a controlled shear environment that can generate bubbles of a suitable size for flotation, with the added advantage that the air is naturally aspirated by the jet, so there is no need for a compressor or blower. Thus the idea of the Jameson Cell was born.

After a number of failures, the radical new process for flotation emerged in the laboratory at the University of Newcastle. Jameson filed a provisional patent application in 1986. After an initial trial at the Renison Bell tin mine in Tasmania, certain design features were modified. He led a further plant trial with a small cell in the lead-zinc concentrator at Mt Isa Mines Ltd in Queensland, initially working alone. The plant metallurgists took an interest in the technology and helped to refine it, particularly checking the scale-up procedures that Jameson had devised. In 1988 a recent graduate was assigned full-time for a year to verify and validate the performance of the Cell. In 1989 a worldwide exclusive license was negotiated between Tunra Ltd on behalf of the University of Newcastle, Jameson, and MIM Holdings Limited, for the use of the Cell for metallurgical purposes. Summary papers on the theory and practice have been published.

There have been ongoing significant changes to the design of the Cell since it was first developed in the late 1980s.

=== Trouble in the mill (1980s) ===
The commercial development of the Cell occurred indirectly as a result of problems being experienced in MIM's Mount Isa lead–zinc concentrator (sometimes referred to as a "mill" in the mining industry). MIM had been operating a lead–zinc concentrator at Mount Isa since 1931, although lead–zinc ore was substituted with copper ore for a time between mid-1943 and mid-1946. Over time, the lead, zinc and other mineral grains in the ore became progressively finer, the ore grade decreased and it became more difficult to treat. These trends, combined with an increase in the concentrator's throughput, significantly reduced the concentrator's performance in the 1980s, resulting in a "tense" period of "an endless circle of circuit changes, reagent changes, operator changes, metallurgist changes, and so on". The decreasing grain size and pushing the grinding circuit beyond its design throughput meant a reduction in the degree of separation of the individual mineral grains (referred to as "liberation") during grinding. From 1984 to 1991, the liberation of sphalerite (the zinc-bearing mineral, ZnS) decreased from almost 70% to just over 50%. This decrease in liberation resulted in a reduction in the recovery of zinc to saleable zinc concentrate.

The initial response to the problem of decreased zinc recovery was in 1986 to start to produce a lower-grade concentrate that was a mixture of zinc and lead (known in the industry as a "bulk concentrate" and referred to at Mount Isa as the "low-grade middlings concentrate"). This concentrate typically contained 34% zinc and 13% lead, compared to the normal zinc concentrate composition of at least 50% zinc and less than 3% lead.

By producing the bulk concentrate, the total recovery of zinc for sale was maintained at over 70% until 1989. However, the high lead content meant that the bulk concentrate could not be treated by the electrolytic zinc process, and it had to be sold to zinc smelters using the more-expensive Imperial Smelting Process. Initially, MIM received good revenue from its bulk concentrate, but as the nature of the ore continued to deteriorate, the production of the bulk concentrate increased and saturated the market. Payment terms declined until MIM received less than half the payment for zinc in the bulk concentrate than it received for zinc in the zinc concentrate.

The problems in the concentrator also affected the performance of MIM's Mount Isa lead smelter. The lead–zinc ore also contained increasing amounts of fine-grained, carbonaceous pyrite (FeS_{2}). This material was naturally hydrophobic and floated without the aid of a collector into the lead concentrate, diluting it. The additional sulfur from the pyrite in the lead concentrate reduced the lead smelter's lead production because the ability to eliminate sulfur from the concentrate was lead smelter's capacity bottleneck.

As part of the effort to try to fix the problems, MIM installed some column flotation cells in the zinc concentrate and bulk concentrate sections of the plant. In those days, the air was introduced into flotation columns using air spargers, usually in the form of a bag or sheath around a pipe. The spargers were high-maintenance items, and their performance was critical to the operation of the column.

=== Inception and early development (1985–1990) ===
==== Lead and zinc flotation ====
In 1985, MIM commissioned Jameson to undertake a project to improve the sparger design for flotation columns. Instead, he developed the concept of using a jet in a downcomer to create the bubbles and eliminate the need for a sparger in conventional flotation columns.

The concept of the Cell followed when further investigations showed that most of the bubble–particle interactions were occurring in the downcomer, rendering unnecessary the collection zone of flotation columns. The idea of the downcomer and short separation tank was developed and a provisional patent application was lodged in 1986. This patent was later assigned to TUNRA Limited ("TUNRA"), the technology transfer company of the University of Newcastle that is now known as "Newcastle Innovation".

A pilot two tonne per hour (t/h) Jameson Cell with a 100 mm downcomer and using an orifice plate to create the jet was tested in MIM's lead–zinc concentrator. Subsequently, in 1988, MIM tested the flotation of a stream of fine lead-bearing particles in a conventional mechanical flotation cell, a conventional column and the Jameson Cell. The Cell gave the best recoveries. This was thought to be a combination of the short residence time of the particles in the Cell and the fact that the hydrophobicity of the lead particles decreased over time.

As a result of this work, in 1989 MIM ordered four full-scale Cells, two for the Mount Isa lead–zinc concentrator and another two for the new Hilton lead–zinc concentrator to be built at the Hilton Mine, located about 20 kilometers north of Mount Isa. The Mount Isa cells had diameters of 1.9 m, with three downcomers each, while those at Hilton were 1.3 m in diameter and had two downcomers each.

==== Coal flotation ====
In parallel with this work, the Cell was tested for the recovery of fine coal at the Newlands coal mine, also owned by MIM Holdings Limited. This fines stream was cyclone overflow, which contained 15–50% ash and was previously discarded. The particle size of this stream was less than 25 μm. Pilot plant testing showed that it was possible to achieve greater than 90% recovery of coal, with less than 10% ash in the product.

Subsequently, a full-scale plant was commissioned at Newlands in the 1988–89 financial year, with six rectangular Cells (1.5 m × 3.5 m) installed in a two-stage arrangement. The cells in the first stage had seven downcomers, while those in the second had six. These cells were in continuous operation at Newlands for 15 years until a new washing plant was built to replace the old one in 2006.

Two additional Cells were installed at MIM Holdings' Collinsville Coal operations in 1990. These had 10 downcomers each.

==== Copper flotation ====
Also in 1989, Peko Mines, then a division of North Broken Hill Peko Limited, also engaged Jameson to undertake test work in its Warrego concentrator near Tennant Creek in Australia's Northern Territory. The objective was to determine the Jameson Cell's performance in cleaning copper concentrate to improve its grade by removing gangue minerals, including pyrite, magnetite, hematite and quartz. Peko Mines personnel also tested a conventional flotation column for comparison. Following the test work, Peko Mines installed two full-scale, 1.4 m diameter Jameson Cells in the concentrator, each with three downcomers.

Peko Mines' decision was based on:

- metallurgical performance during pilot plant test work
- lower capital expenditure and installation costs
- shorter construction and installation times
- ease of operation and lower expected maintenance costs.

Peko Mines reported a payback on the investment in the Cells of two months.

==== Electrolyte cleaning in solvent extraction – electrowinning plants ====
Solvent extraction – electrowinning (often referred to as "SX–EW") is a process frequently applied for recovering copper from low-grade and/or oxidised copper ore. It involves leaching the copper from the ore using an acidic solution, collecting the leach liquor containing the copper and contacting this solution with an organic extractant. The copper ions in the leach liquor transfer to the organic extractant, moving from a relatively low concentration to a higher concentration. The extractant is subsequently brought into contact with a second aqueous solution that is more acid than the original leach liquor, and the copper again moves, this time from the extractant into the aqueous solution. The result is an acidic solution of copper in which the copper concentration is high enough for it to be recovered by electrowinning. The solution destined for electrowinning is known as the electrolyte.

The electrolyte solution usually contains traces of the organic extractant that exist as tiny droplets within it. These need to be removed before the copper can be recovered in the electrowinning process, as the presence of minimal amounts of the extractant can cause difficulties by stripping and damaging the cathodes with a subsequent loss of cathode copper quality.

In the late 1980s, MIM built an SX–EW plant at Mount Isa to recover copper leached from low grade ore stockpiled while mining its Black Rock open cut in the 1960s. In a world first, a Jameson Cell was used to clean the electrolyte solution by removing the remaining organic solvent. This replaced the sand filters traditionally used.

The cell was 3 m high, twice the height of the early Cells used in MIM's lead–zinc concentrators, as it was thought that additional residence time would enhance recovery. It used a single downcomer. The downcomer was used to contact the electrolyte with air and the droplets of the organic extractant attached themselves to the air bubbles created in the downcomer.

After some initial modifications to the orifice size, the Cell was able to remove 70–90% of the entrained organic extractant.

==== Early spread of the technology ====
In April 1989, MIM Holdings Limited acquired the world rights to the Jameson Cell from TUNRA, with TUNRA retaining the rights to use the Cell for waste water treatment.

After the initial applications within the MIM Holdings group of companies, the years to 1994 saw Jameson Cells installed by various base and precious metals companies in Asia, South Africa, Canada and the United States, mainly in concentrate cleaning duties, but also in SX–EW electrolyte cleaning duties. The installation by Phelps Dodge (now Freeport-McMoRan) for electrolyte cleaning at its Morenci operation in Arizona was notable for having a large cell 6.5 m in diameter with 30 downcomers. The Morenci Jameson Cell consistently recovered over 82% of the organic extractant.

Toward the end of the period, Cells were installed in coal preparation plants operated by the BHP Mitsubishi Alliance and by Peabody for fines recovery.

==== Early design developments ====
Improvements to this early design included a focus on the weight and wear of the downcomer. The downcomer was originally built with polyurethane-lined steel, and then changed to a high-density polyethylene ("HDPE") construction with seven elements.

The orifice plate used to generate the slurry jet was a high-wear item and its materials of construction were also a focus of the development effort. After testing high-chromium hardened steel and various ceramics, high-density alumina was found to have excellent wear properties, and it became the standard.

=== The Mark II Cell (1994–1999) ===
==== Mark II improvements ====
The original Jameson Cell design had the following features:

- small (200 mm diameter) downcomers
- no wash water
- no tailings recycle
- no bubble dispersers
- low capacity.

In 1994 MIM launched the Mark II model Cell. It incorporated the following changes:

- the downcomer diameter was increased to 280 mm
- wash-water trays were included for froth washing
- a tailings recycle system was added to maintain constant downcomer flow and higher recoveries
- conical bubble dispersers were added
- increased depth of tank from the bottom of the downcomer
- increased distance between the downcomers.

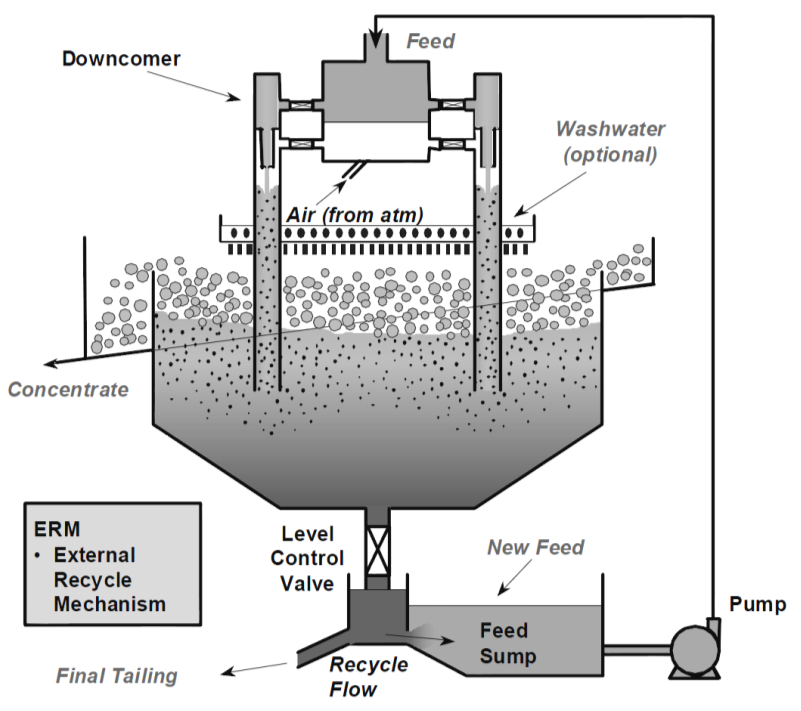
Figure 5. Drawing of a Jameson Cell fitted with an external tailings recycle mechanism.

These changes resulted in a higher capacity design.

One of the problems encountered with the Mark I Cell was that its performance was reduced if the feed rate to the cell varied, which was a common occurrence arising from normal fluctuations in operating concentrators. This problem was resolved by recycling some of the tailings to the cell feed via an external splitter box called an "External Recycle Mechanism" or "ERM" box separate to the flotation cell. Thus, when the production of the feed stream to the Jameson Cell decreased as a result of a fluctuation elsewhere in the concentrator, a higher percentage of the tailings was automatically recycled to the downcomers, producing a constant flow rate, hence feed pressure, to the cell. This had the added benefit of giving a proportion of the tailings (typically 40%) a second pass through the system, which resulted in higher recoveries. In coal fines flotation, this allowed a single Cell to achieve the same recovery of combustibles as had previously been achieved in some two-stage Cell systems.

Subsequently, an internal recycling system, referred to as the "internal recycle control" or "IRC" was developed. This was mainly used in integrated rectangular cells (see Figure 6), where the feed tank and tailings recycling system could easily be built in a single unit with the flotation cell. This system reduced the cell installation costs and made the cell more compact.

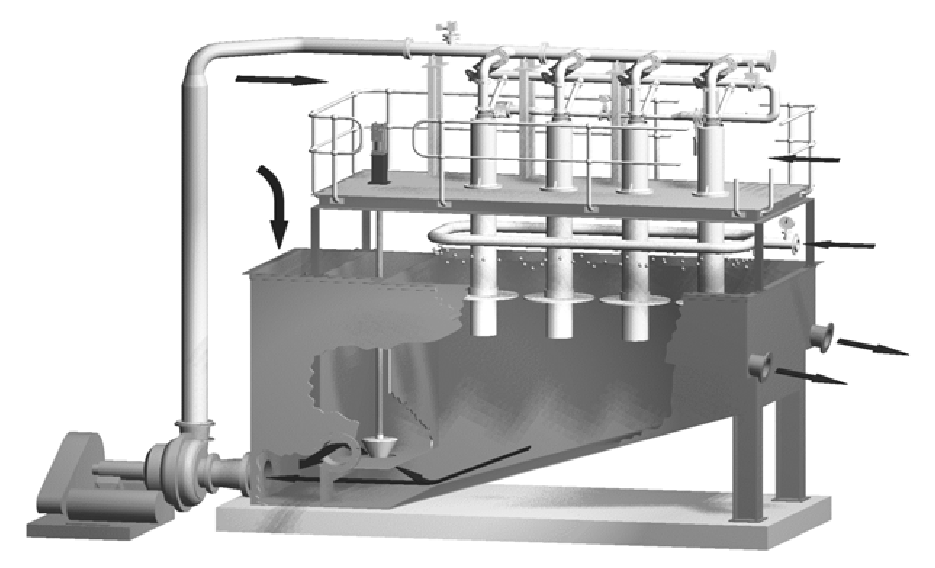
Figure 6. Drawing of a Jameson Cell designed with an internal tailings recycling system.

During this period, the orifice diameter was increased from the 28 mm design used in 1990 to 34 mm with the Mark II model and 38 mm in 1997. This, together with the larger Mark II downcomer diameter, allowed the slurry flow per downcomer to be doubled from 30 m^{3}/h in 1990 to 60 m^{3}/h in 1997.

The increased distance between the downcomers reduced the interaction of aerated slurry discharging from adjacent downcomers. This interaction could reduce overall cell recovery by causing particles collected by bubbles in the downcomer to detach in the pulp tank.

There was significant turbulence in the areas beneath the downcomers. that could result in particles detaching from bubbles. These turbulent areas were calmed by the addition of conical diffusers beneath each downcomer. They allowed uniform bubble rise velocities across the surface of the cell by slowing the superficial gas velocity in the high void-fraction area immediately around the downcomer and provided a more even bubble dispersion. It was reported that the diffusers reduced the turbulence by 69% compared with a standard downcomer with no diffuser.

==== New applications ====
While the JamesonCell continued to expand in base metals concentrate cleaning, SX–EW electrolyte cleaning and coal fines recovery applications, it also found new applications in cleaning potash slimes and was adopted by the Philex Mining Corporation as the sole flotation machine for its Benguet copper concentrator. This is not the normal application for the Cell. No other metals concentrator operates solely using Jameson Cells.

===== Potash flotation =====
Cleveland Potash Limited extracts and refines sylvinite ore from a deposit in North Yorkshire, England. Its processing plant uses froth flotation to produce a product rich in potassium chloride ("KCl"). After a test work campaign in which it compared the performance of the Cell with mechanical flotation cells in various duties in the flotation circuit, Cleveland Potash ordered a Cell with 6 downcomers for recovering potash slimes. The test work had shown a 4.8% increase in the recovery of potash slimes, equivalent at the time to an increase in revenue of approximately £518,000 per year.

===== Copper rougher flotation =====
In 1993 Philex Mining Corporation, a Philippines mining company, replaced the mechanical cleaner circuit with Cells at its Benguet copper concentrator. Following their successful operation, Philex replaced the mechanical cells in its cleaner-scavenger circuit in 1994 and began the phased introduction of Cell rougher and scavenger lines that was completed in early 1996. This was the first operation in which the external recycle mechanism system was applied. By the time the last Jameson Cell was installed, the entire flotation circuit was composed of Jameson Cells.

The motivation for installing Jameson Cells was, in part, to take advantage of their space-saving capabilities and to improve copper recovery at a minimum cost. The Cell circuit occupied 60% less floor area and achieved equivalent results to the mechanical banks with 40% of their residence time. They provided a power saving of 18%.

In addition to these benefits, the use of the Jameson Cells in the rougher and rougher–scavenger section of the plant resulted in a 3.3% increase in copper recovery and a 4.5% increase in gold recovery. When combined with the other Cells in the cleaner, recleaner and cleaner–scavenger section, there was a 2.6% increase in final copper concentrate grade and a 3.5% increase in plant copper recovery, with a 2.6% increase in plant gold recovery.

=== The Mark III Cell (2000–2008) ===
==== Mark III improvements ====
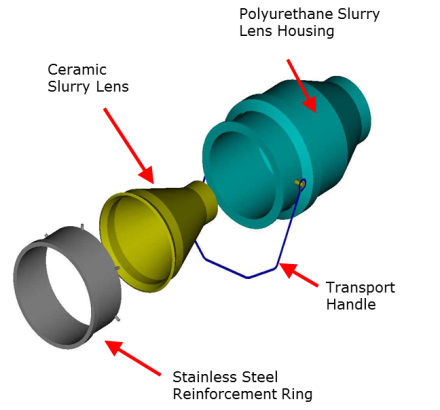
Figure 7. The Jameson Cell Mark IV slurry lens.

The Mark III design encompassed the greatest improvement in the technology since its commercialisation. The focus was to make the technology more robust and easier to use in operations. The total redesign of the downcomer assembly allowed it to be isolated and unblocked much more easily compared to the Mark II design. The Mark III design also saw slurry flow per downcomer to be increased from 60 m^{3}/h to 75–85 m^{3}/h using larger orifice sizes in the slurry lenses.

The Mark III Cell was introduced in 2000. It included the following improvements:

- a new slurry lens orifice design (see Figures 7 and 8)
- a new design downcomer and nozzle
- a new design flat plate bubble dispersers
- a stainless steel adjustable above and in-froth wash water system (see Figure 9)
- automated air and wash water flow control
- air-isolating slurry-eliminating valves ("AISE valves")
- a bottom-fed new slurry distributor.

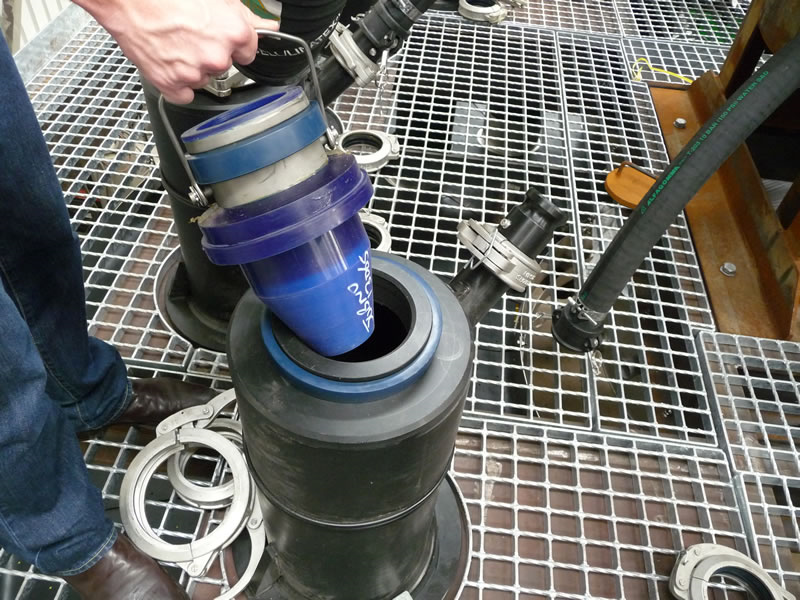
Figure 8. A Jameson Cell slurry lens being inserted into the top of a downcomer.

The earlier models of the Jameson Cell used orifice plates to generate the downcomer jet. The new slurry lens design had a smooth, shallow entry angle that created an optimum flow regime over the ceramic, reducing wear and extending its life. The shape resulted in a decrease in power consumption by the feed slurry pump by up to 10% and resulted in better jet formation that improved air entrainment.

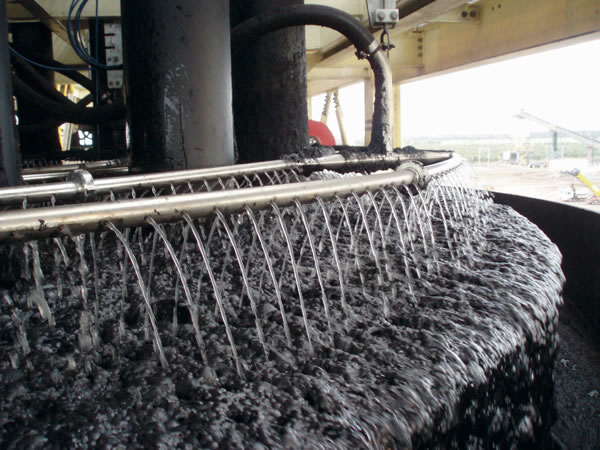
Figure 9. A stainless-steel wash water system fitted to a Jameson Cell being used for floating coal fines.

For coal applications, the wash water addition system was changed from a tray to stainless-steel circular rings attached to a manual lifting system. This allowed the flexibility of an easy transition from above-froth wash water addition to the in-froth addition that might be necessary for high concentrate-grade operations. For metals applications, new design wash water trays consisting of removable rubber mats for easy maintenance were used.

The AISE valves were developed to prevent solids being sucked back into the air lines when individual downcomers become blocked. Solids depositing in the air lines and their build up in the air distributor decreases flotation performance as it prevents air from being efficiently entrained in the downcomers.

==== New applications ====
This period was one of rapid growth for the Jameson Cells in the existing applications. Seventy-seven Cells were installed in concentrators around the world, mainly in coal and base metal operations. However, during this time, the Cell also moved into the Canadian oil sands industry for the flotation of bitumen.

===== Bitumen flotation =====
Flotation is one of the unit processes used to separate the bituminous component of oil sands as part of the process of oil extraction. Some of the bitumen is not recovered in the primary separation vessel and reports to the tailings. These tailings are typically retreated in a scavenging operation to try to recover some of the remaining bitumen.

Three industrial-size single downcomer Jameson Cells were sold by Xstrata Technology to Shell Canada in 2007 for a large scale pilot plant project and eight 500 mm downcomers were sold to Syncrude Limited in 2008. In the latter case, the downcomers were used to treat middlings in an existing tertiary oil recovery vessel in a bitumen recovery process patented by Syncrude.

=== The Mark IV Cell (2009– ) ===
==== Mark IV improvements ====
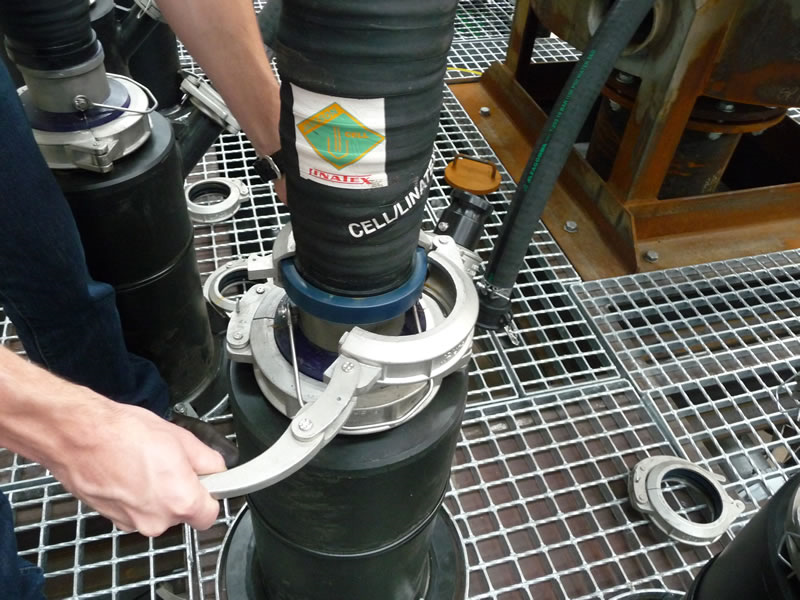
Figure 10. Photograph of the quick-release clamps used to attach the slurry line to the top of the Jameson Cell downcomer.

The Mark IV Cell design was introduced in 2009. It included the following improvements:

- a flexible hose for easier alignment of the downcomer
- clamping of the slurry lens onto the downcomer (see Figure 10)
- stainless steel quick-release clamps in the downcomer assembly
- long-lasting rubber flaps in the AISE valves.

== Current applications ==
=== Base and precious metals flotation ===
In base and precious metals flotation, the Jameson Cell has established itself as being particularly useful in several applications in flotation circuits that also use other types of flotation cells, such as mechanical cells. These applications include:

- preflotation roughers for removing naturally hydrophobic gangue materials (such as carbon, talc and elemental sulfur), where the Jameson Cell minimises the entrainment of the valuable minerals while eliminating naturally floating gangue minerals that would otherwise contaminate the concentrate
- rougher-scalper and roughing duties where selectivity and froth washing produce high-grade concentrate. In this application, the recovery in one Jameson Cell is normally equivalent to several mechanical cells, and where the feed contains fast-floating liberated particles, the Cell can produce final-grade product, thus reducing the number of mechanical cells required in a flotation circuit
- cleaner-scalper duties, in which the Jameson Cell recovers fast floating minerals to produce a final-grade concentrate, thus reducing the load on the rest of the cleaning circuit and reducing its size. In this application, it can also be used as a low-cost way of expanding the capacity of an existing cleaner circuit
- final cleaning duties where mechanical cleaning circuits are unable to consistently produce final grade concentrate because of entrained gangue, the Jameson Cell with its enhanced selectivity and froth washing, is able to remove the gangue

=== Coal flotation ===
The Jameson Cell has been found to be particularly effective in cleaning and recovering fine coal particles. For example, at BHP Coal's Goonyella mine (now part of the BHP Mitsubishi Alliance) eight Cells were installed to replace the entire 32 mechanical cell flotation circuit in 1995 in its 1800 t/h coal flotation plant. The result was an overall increase in yield for the plant of 3.5% (better than the predicted yield of 2.1% that was used to justify the project) and the production of a low-ash product.

Since then, Jameson Cells have been installed in many coal preparation plants around the world, with the largest installation at the Curragh coal mine in Australia, where 12 Cells treat over 5 million t/y of coal fines.

The Cell can also be applied to coal preparation plant tailings to recover fine coal previously discarded.

=== SX–EW plants ===
The Jameson Cell is used to recover the organic solvent in solvent extraction – electrowinning plants from both the electrolyte and raffinate streams.

Contamination of the electrolyte increases operating costs and reduces the quality of the copper product. Any solvent remaining in the raffinate stream represents a loss of solvent and hence an increase in operating costs.

Major users of the Cell in SX–EW plants include Freeport McMoRan at its Morenci operations, BHP Billiton at its Olympic Dam operations and Grupo México at its Cananea and La Caridad operations. In all, Xstrata Technology reports 41 SX–EW applications.

Recent developments in the Cell design for SX–EW applications include large, flat-bottomed cell design to allow it to sit on the ground and large (500 mm diameter) downcomers that can have multiple liquor (there being no slurry in SX–EW applications) lenses fitted to each downcomer.

The biggest operating Cell is at the Olympic Dam operations, treating 3000 m^{3}/h of raffinate.

=== Potash ===
The first potash application was in England in 1993, where Jameson Cells were used to treat potash slimes (see Potash flotation). It has subsequently been applied at Israel Chemicals Limited's Dead Sea Works and by an unnamed producer in the Saskatchewan province of Canada.

=== Oil sands ===
The Jameson Cell has been adopted by Shell Canada and Syncrude for floating bitumen in the oil sands industry (see Bitumen flotation). Syncrude bought an additional eight 500 mm downcomers for its plant in 2012.

=== Iron ore ===
The Jameson Cell can be used for the reverse flotation of silica from iron ore, where flotation columns have traditionally been used.

=== Phosphate flotation ===
Phosphate processing operations that use flotation as the principal mechanism to concentrate the phosphate-bearing minerals usually discard particles smaller than 20 μm in diameter. This is because the fine particles have had poor flotation performance and because their presence decreases the flotation performance of the coarse particles.

Legend International Holdings Incorporated ("Legend") owns major phosphate deposits that average 20–60% particles less than 20 μm that contain up to 50% of the phosphate. This makes the traditional phosphate concentration practice uneconomic for these deposits. In response, Legend developed a process based on using the Jameson Cell in a rougher-scavenger-cleaner configuration to recover at least 80% of the phosphate at a grade of at least 32% P_{2>}O_{5} from a feed with a particle size distribution of up to 80% less than 20 μm.

== Advantages ==
The Jameson Cell reportedly has the following advantages:

- relatively low energy use – the only energy that is required to operate the Cell is to pump the slurry through the slurry lens. This means that it requires significantly less electricity than conventional mechanical or column flotation cells. In addition, the better particle–bubble contact means that fewer Cells are required for the equivalent duty of mechanical cells, giving an even bigger power saving.
- high recovery of fines – The Cell is able to achieve final product specification from previously discarded coal fines at very high recoveries (95–98%) in a single pass. It has also been shown to be effective in recovering fine particles in base metals, potash and phosphate applications.
- effective froth washing – The Cell uses froth washing as standard to control concentrate grade. A conventional flotation cell has problems with recovering fine particles at high grades due to the entrainment of gangue minerals in the froth. The high throughput of the Jameson Cell means that the froth is produced in a small surface area so it is economic to apply froth washing to all cells
- easily scaled up – the hydrodynamic conditions for particle collection inside the downcomer and separation in the tank are identical between the laboratory, pilot plant and industrial-scale Jameson Cell, meaning that there is direct scale-up. This makes predicting plant performance for small-scale tests straightforward. In contrast, factors have to be used to scale-up the design of mechanical and column flotation cells.
- relatively small footprint – the high intensity of bubble-particle contact means that very low residence times are required in the Cell (residence time in the downcomer is 5–10 seconds and the separation tank volume is small compared with alternative technologies). This means that the total volume of the Cell is lower than the alternatives.
- fast response to process changes – process variables such as air flow rate, froth depth and wash water are all automated making optimisation straightforward. The small tank volumes means very short residence times in the tank (typically 1–3 minutes) so changes made, whether they are deliberate or from normal plant fluctuations, are observed almost instantly.
- rapid start-up and shutdown – the small volume of the tank means that the Cell can be filled and drained quickly so with plant upsets the Cell can reach steady state very quickly.
- low maintenance costs – the Cell has no moving parts and is designed to provide easy access to serviceable parts. The slurry lens orifice has a service life exceeding 5 years under normal operating conditions and the service life of the other wet-end wear parts is reported to be over 10 years under normal operating conditions.
- low capital cost – the small footprint of the Cell reduces the amount of steel required in its construction and, coupled with the simplicity of its design, has lower installation costs when compared with conventional or column flotation cells.
- low operating costs – the lack of moving parts with a consequent lower power consumption, long wear life and easy access results in low operating costs.
- short payback periods – Cell users typically report short payback periods for their investments in the technology. For example, the 2007 installation of a 5.4 m diameter Jameson Cell with 18 downcomers to treat preflotation concentrate recovered up to 90% of the zinc previously lost to the tailings disposal facility and had a payback of approximately one year at the zinc prices of the day. Peko Mines reported a payback period of two months for its Cell installation. The complete replacement of 32 mechanical cells with eight Jameson Cells at the Goonyella coal mine had a payback of 17 months. More recently, the installation of a Cell ahead of each of two cleaner trains at the Telfer Mine had a payback of between two and seven months.
