= Graeme Jameson =

Australian engineering professor

Professor Graeme Jameson AO FRS FAA FTSE
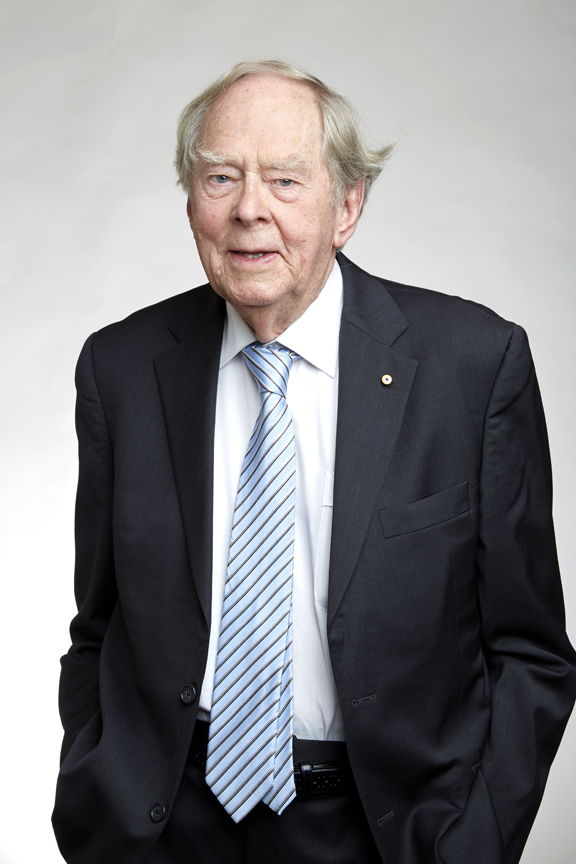
- Jameson in 2018
- Born: Graeme John Jameson
- Education: University of New South Wales; University of Cambridge
- Known for: Jameson Cell
- Scientific career
- Fields: Mineral processing Flotation
- Workplaces: University of Newcastle, Australia
- Thesis: The behaviour of a bubble in a vertically oscillating liquid, and allied topics (1963)
- Website: www.newcastle.edu.au/profile/graeme-jameson

Graeme John Jameson (born 1936) is an Australian engineer who is a professor and Director of the Centre for Multiphase Processes at the University of Newcastle, Australia, in New South Wales, Australia. He is notable for being the inventor of the Jameson Cell mineral separation device, which he devised in the 1980s. The Jameson Cell uses bubbles to separate super fine particles during mineral processing. It is based on the froth flotation mineral separation process, first invented in 1905.

In the coal industry alone, Jameson's cell has retrieved A$36 billion worth of export coal particles. It is being used worldwide in the separation of coal, copper, lead, nickel, platinum, silver and zinc.

== Education ==
In 1960 Jameson received a Bachelor of Science degree in chemical engineering from the University of New South Wales (UNSW), and in 1963 a PhD from the University of Cambridge.

== Career and research ==
Jameson has been Professor of Chemical Engineering at the University of Newcastle since 1978.

=== Awards and honours ===
Jameson was appointed an Officer of the Order of Australia (AO) in 2005, and received the Antoine M. Gaudin Medal in 2013. In 2013 he was also NSW Scientist of the Year. In 2015 he won a Prime Minister's Prize for Science for his cell, and the Prime Minister's Prize for Innovation. Also in 2015, he was elected a member of the National Academy of Engineering for the development of innovative flotation technology for advanced mineral processing. In 2018 he was elected a Fellow of the Royal Society (FRS), the oldest scientific academy in continuous existence with a fellowship of 1600 of the world's most eminent scientists.
