= Ross H. Stanfield =

Canadian businessman and mining promoter (1927–2010)

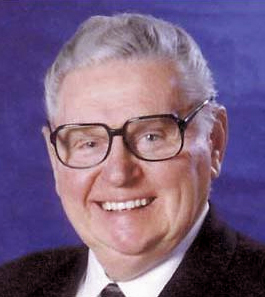
- Ross H. Stanfield
- Born: Dietrich Goertzen; 1927
- Died: 2 August 2010 (aged 82–83)
- Occupation: Mining Promoter

Ross Stanfield (born in 1927 and christened Dietrich Goertzen - died August 2, 2010) was a self-styled mining promoter based in Calgary, Alberta, Canada. Mr Stanfield had been active in the industry at least since the mid-1970s. In 1964, he and his business partner at the time, John Hilton, optioned property near Williams Lake, British Columbia to a penny stock company called Gibraltar Mines Ltd. Together with senior partner Placer Developments Ltd., Gibraltar Mines Ltd. eventually brought the Gibraltar Mine, a current holding of Taseko Mines Limited and the second largest copper mine in Canada, into production in 1972.

Stanfield Mining Group of Canada Ltd. is an umbrella for several corporate entities controlled by R.H. Stanfield. The companies include Fort Steele Mineral Corporation, Zeus Mineral Corporation, Gallowai Metal Mining Corporation, Bul River Mineral Corporation, Big Bear Metal Mining Corporation, International Feldspar Ltd., Giant Steeples Mineral Corporation, Grand Mineral Corporation, Kutteni Diamonds Ltd. and White Cat Metal Mining Corporation.

== Controversy ==
Stanfield's companies have raised at least $220,000,000 CDN in the last three and a half decades from more than 3,700 investors mainly in Alberta and Saskatchewan, yet Stanfield remained president and sole individual in possession of voting shares until the time of his death.

In 2007 the sudden unexplained terminations of key tenured contract employees alarmed several investors from Edmonton, Alberta, who decided to coordinate their efforts to discover exactly what the status of the mine and their investment was. Stanfield responded with a $202 million lawsuit against them.

Stanfield's Alberta lawsuit against the Galloway Twelve has been stayed in the courts pending the results of a petition the G12 launched in the province of British Columbia, to attempt to remove Ross Stanfield and to secure an independent investigation into the true value of the ore alleged to be present at Stanfield's operations, specifically regarding the companies Gallowai Metal Mining Corporation and Bul River Mineral Corporation.

== Results of the BC petition ==
On February 2, 2010, the Honourable Mr. Justice Leask concluded in the case of Stalkhe v. Stanfield (2010 BCSC 142) that the respondents, Ross Stanfield, Gallowai Metal Mining Corporation and Bul River Mineral Corporation, engaged in no oppressive conduct and dismissed the G12 petition with costs awarded to the respondents. The Galloway Twelve have filed an appeal. On July 16, 2010, a BC Securities Commission hearing requested by BCSC enforcement staff ordered Ross Stanfield to provide a mineral resource estimate on Gallowai Bul River by July 15, 2011, using an independent geologist. The first update of that report is due October 15, 2010.

== Death ==
Ross H. Stanfield died of natural causes on August 2, 2010, at 83 years of age.
