= Mount Isa Mines =

Mine in Queensland, Australia

- Location in Australia
- Location: Mount Isa, Queensland, Australia; 20°42′58″S 139°28′34″E
- Products: Copper; Zinc; Lead; Silver
- Opened: 1924
- Company: Glencore
- Website: www.mountisamines.com.au

Mount Isa Mines Limited ("MIM") operates the Mount Isa copper, lead, zinc and silver mines near Mount Isa, Queensland, Australia as part of the Glencore group of companies. For a brief period in 1980, MIM was Australia's largest company. It has pioneered several significant mining industry innovations, including the Isa Process copper refining technology, the Isasmelt smelting technology, and the IsaMill fine grinding technology, and it also commercialized the Jameson Cell column flotation technology.

== History ==
In 1923 the orebody containing lead, zinc and silver was discovered by the miner John Campbell Miles. Prominent mining engineer William Henry Corbould was invited to the field by Douglas MacGilvray, who held options over several tenements, and immediately noted similarities between the Mount Isa orebodies and those of Broken Hill, New South Wales. Corbould secured an option over 400 acres (160 ha) and in January 1924 floated Mount Isa Mines Ltd (MIM) in Sydney with himself as director and general manager.

MIM was one of three companies founded in 1924 to develop the minerals discovered by Miles, but production did not begin until May 1931. The other two companies were Mount Isa Silver Lead Proprietary and Mount Isa South. These were both acquired by MIM by late 1925. Corbould played a key role in consolidating the ground under MIM, investing his own funds and persuading the state government to extend the railway from Duchess. He resigned as general manager in 1927 but remained a major shareholder.

=== The lean years (1924–1945) ===
The early years were characterized by the struggle to develop the lead–zinc ore bodies, including the need to finance drilling, metallurgical test work and shaft sinking, and there was significant doubt that Miles' discovery would ever amount to much. However, by the end of 1928, the drilling had allowed an estimate of reserves of 21.2 million tons, which were at the time the largest in Australian history, and rose to an estimate of 32 million tons in 1930.

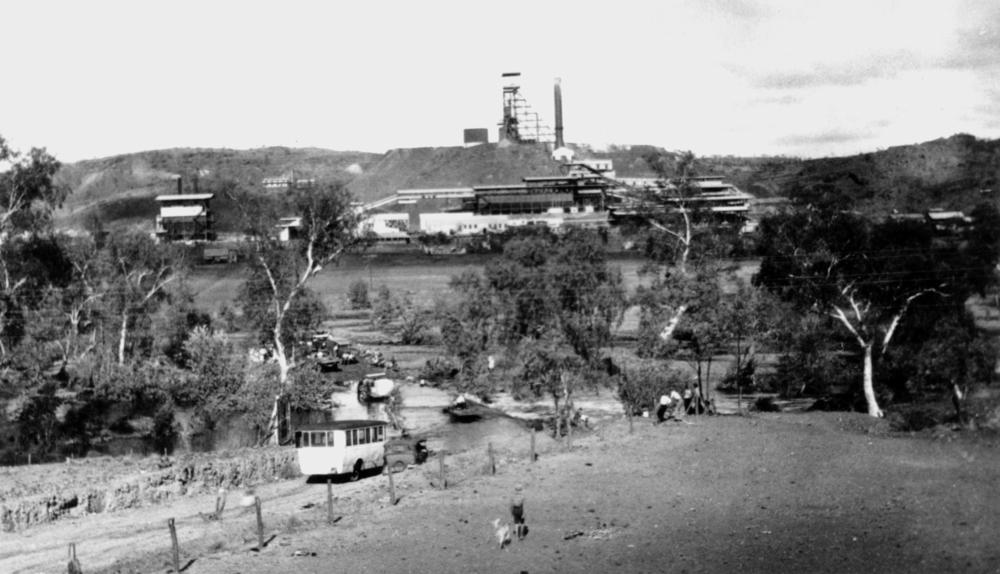
The Mount Isa Mines surface works as seen from the east bank of the Leichhardt River in 1932.

Crucial to the success of any mining venture was a rail line connecting the area to the coast. However, the Queensland Government was reluctant to invest in a railway to what might be a mine of limited life. After the mining company guaranteed to cover any losses, construction of the railway from Cloncurry to Mount Isa began in 1926, and the line opened on 27 May 1929, giving Mount Isa an essential link to Queensland's eastern seaboard.

The cost of developing the Mount Isa ore body was so high that the owners had to turn to ASARCO to obtain sufficient finance to bring the operation into production. The project was running behind schedule and over budget, which ultimately resulted in ASARCO sending its own man, Julius Kruttschnitt II, to take charge. Kruttschnitt arrived in 1930 to find that bills were going unpaid because there was no money to pay them, the shafts were flooding, and the construction of the surface plants was months behind schedule.

When mining commenced in 1931, the mine was mechanized to an extent not previously seen in Australia, with mechanized drilling and mechanical shovels rather than "hammer and tap" hand drilling and hand shovels. The initial mine production was 660,000 tonnes per year ("t/y") of ore and stayed at about this level until 1953.

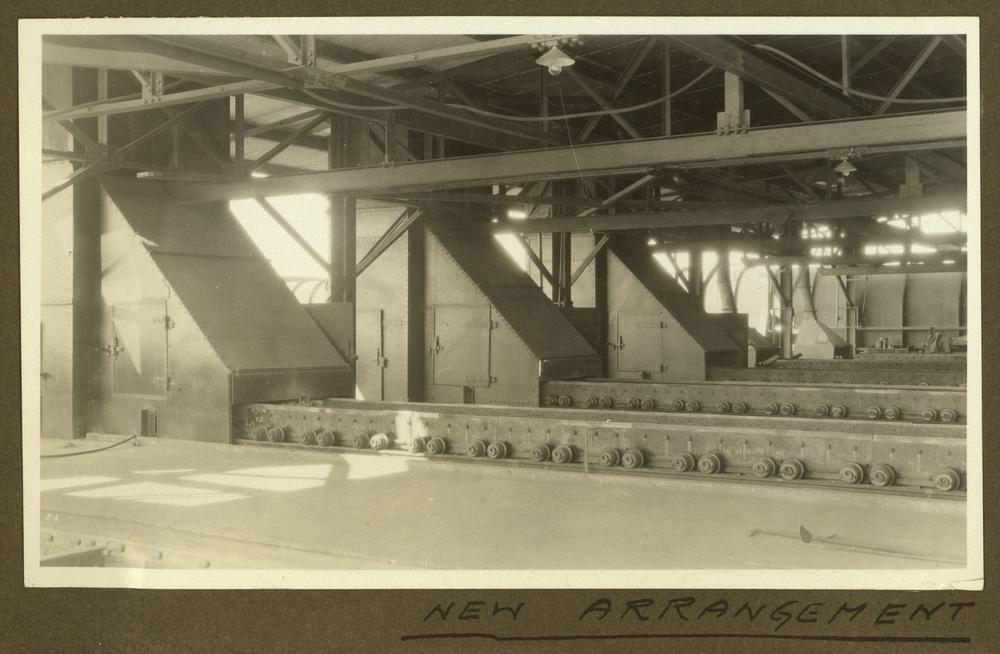
The sinter machines in the Mount Isa lead smelter, 1932.

Even after the first ore had been mined and processed, the Mount Isa operations struggled. The smelter proved inadequate and required a third blast furnace and additional sintering machines. The recovery of valuable minerals in the concentrator was less than expected, and the metal prices were depressed by the Great Depression of the 1930s. The poor recoveries were found to be caused by the unusually (for the time) fine nature of the mineral grains in the Mount Isa ore. While the metal prices eventually recovered as the Depression passed, the fine mineral grains would never be resolved by the Mount Isa lead–zinc operations.

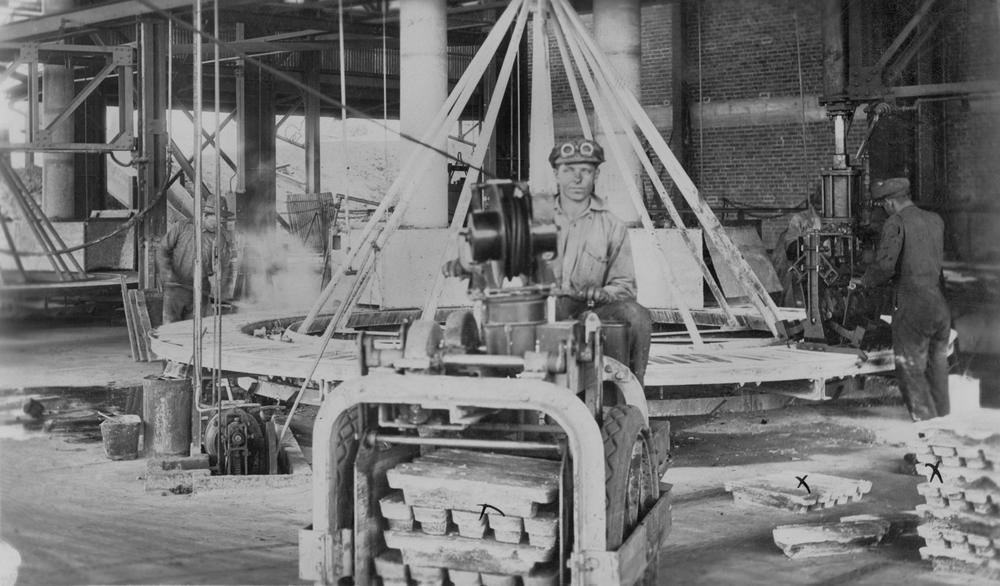
Lead smelter casting area, 1933

By June 1933, the debt owed by MIM to creditors around the world, £2.88 million, was equal to 15% of all income tax paid in Australia in 1932. It was not until the 1936–1937 financial year that MIM made its first profit and the company could begin to pay down its burden of debt. However, the outbreak of The Second World War was not kind to MIM, because it could no longer find markets for all its production, and the price of lead did not increase as it had during the First World War.

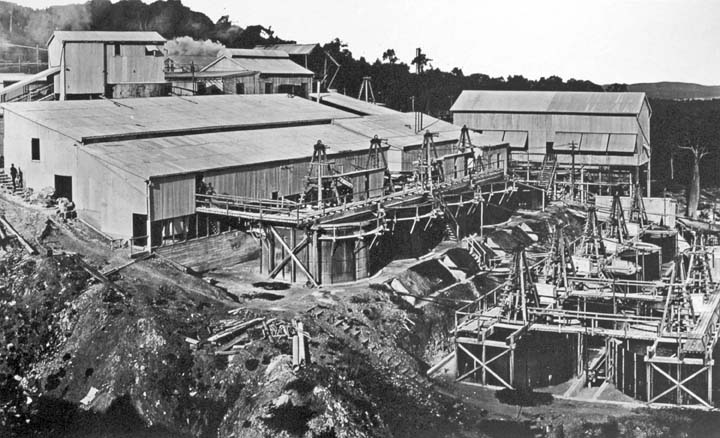
No. 1 Concentrator, Mount Isa Mines, 1940

While some copper mineralization had been discovered during drilling in the late 1920s, the major find did not come until 1930, when drilling to explore the lead–zinc ore body passed through almost 38 meters of copper mineralization with an average grade of 4.3% copper. While this was a very good grade, MIM did not have the financial resources to develop the copper, and it was not until global copper prices increased in 1937 that there was an incentive for further copper exploration. These efforts were initially unsuccessful, but yielded fruit in 1940 and 1941. However, it was not until 1941–1942 that mining of the No. 7 level of the Black Star lead-zinc ore body allowed the existence of an economic copper deposit to be established.

MIM was still not in a position to mine the copper, because it had stockpiles of lead bullion and zinc concentrate that could not be sold due to the war. However, the Australian government needed copper for its war effort and lent MIM £50,000 to allow the mining to proceed. Further drilling expanded the copper reserves and MIM decided to switch from lead to copper production. The lead–zinc concentrator could treat the copper ore with little modification, but the lead smelter required the addition of second-hand equipment lying idle at the Kuridala, Mount Cuthbert and Mount Elliott mines.

Lead smelting ceased on 9 April 1943 and sintering of copper concentrate commenced on the same day. While the copper had the potential to be more profitable, MIM's run of bad luck did not end then: the Australian Government's Department of Supply and Shipping decided that it no longer needed MIM's copper and recommended returning production to lead and zinc as from January 1944, without compensation for the expense of converting the operations to copper production. After much discussion between MIM and the Australian government, MIM was permitted to continue to produce copper until six months after the end of the Pacific War. The last copper was produced on 2 May 1946 and lead production resumed at a time of rising lead prices.

=== From survival to prosperity (1946–1973) ===
In 1947, MIM paid its first dividend, signaling an end to its early troubles, after 16 years of continuous production and 23 years after the company's formation.

That same year, exploration began north of the Mount Isa ore bodies, in an area that later became the Hilton mine and, following the discovery of an outcrop of rocks similar to the host rocks of the Mount Isa ore bodies, diamond drilling began in August 1948. That first drill hole intersected a small amount of zinc mineralization. From then until 1957, a significant drilling program was undertaken and by 1950, the Hilton ore reserves stood at 26 million tonnes. The drilling program was curtailed in 1957 due to a fall in metal prices and heavy capital expenditure in the existing operations.

To ensure adequate supplies of coal for its power station, which supplied both MIM's operations and the city of Mount Isa, MIM bought a controlling interest in Bowen Consolidated Coals Mines Limited in 1951.

The profitable years following the war allowed MIM to repay its debts, including those to ASARCO. ASARCO used the money it received from MIM to buy shares, and owned 53% of MIM's shares by 1960. MIM was also able to construct a copper concentrator and copper smelter, and copper production resumed in January 1953. Later that year, Kruttschnitt resigned as Chairman of MIM's Board of Directors.

With the recommencement of copper mining, total ore production doubled from the 660,000 tonnes per year level that had been maintained since production began in 1931. Both the copper and lead-zinc ores were treated in separate circuits in the same concentrator, which was later referred to at the "No. 1 concentrator".

Initial copper production used two multiple-hearth roasters, a single coal-fired reverberatory furnace and two Peirce-Smith converters to produce a design 1,500 tons of blister copper per month (18,000 tons per year). The copper smelter produced 15,000 tons of copper during 1953.

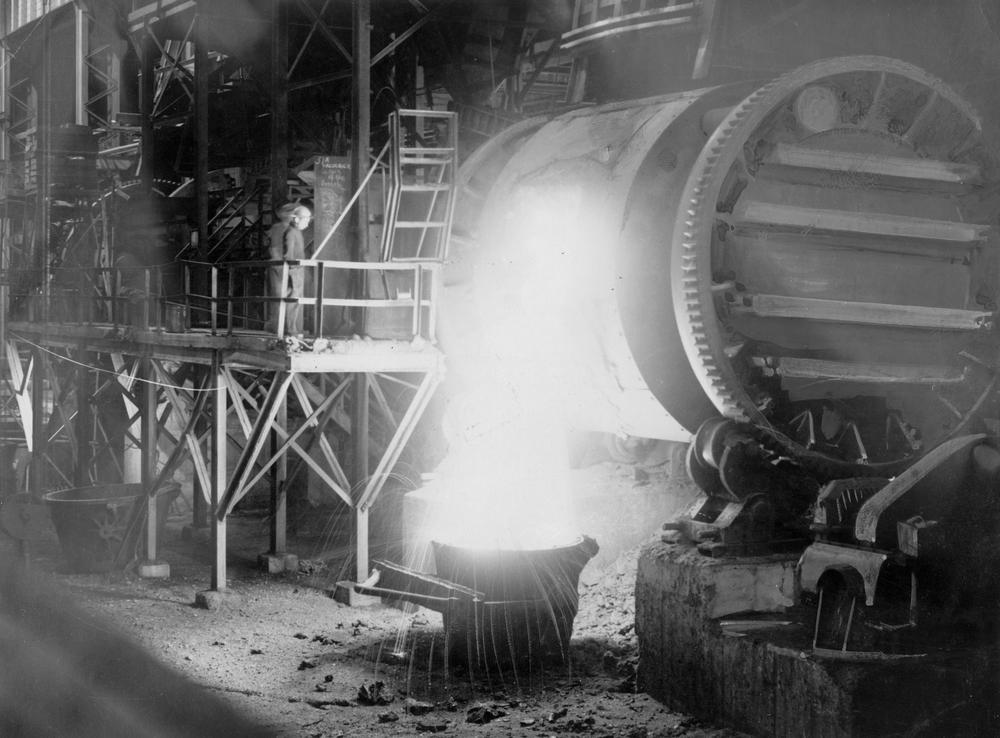
Pouring from a Peirce-Smith copper converter, Mount Isa, 1954.

Exploration activities between 1952 and 1960 expanded the Mount Isa ore reserves from 9.9 million tons of lead-zinc-silver ore to 25.6 million tons, and from 3.8 million tons of copper ore to 24.2 million tons. As a consequence of the expansion of reserves, MIM decided to expand production. The quantity of copper produced rose from zero in 1952 to 60,000 tons in 1960, while the lead bullion output increased from about 36,860 tons in 1952 to 60,000 tons in 1959 and then reduced to 52,000 tons in 1960 as a consequence of a decision to reduce output in the face of a global oversupply of lead metal.

In 1957, a third roaster was added in the copper smelter and the width of the reverberatory furnace was expanded. In 1960, two large roasters and a second, larger, reverberatory furnace were constructed to expand the copper smelter capacity to 70,000 tons of blister copper per year. The original reverberatory furnace was retained as a spare to be used in case of major maintenance of the new furnace. The new furnace was referred to as the "No 1 furnace" and the older, spare, furnace was named the "No. 2 furnace".

MIM had been selling blister copper, but in 1960 it started refining blister copper to produce copper cathode at its new electrolytic copper refinery at Stuart, near Townsville. The initial capacity of the Copper Refineries Pty Ltd ("CRL") refinery was 40,000 tons per year of refined cathode, but further construction commenced in 1960 to expand this capacity to 60,000 tons per year. A new smelter was built on the same site in Mount Isa and commissioned in March 1962, lifting the copper smelting capacity to 100,000 tonnes of blister copper per year.

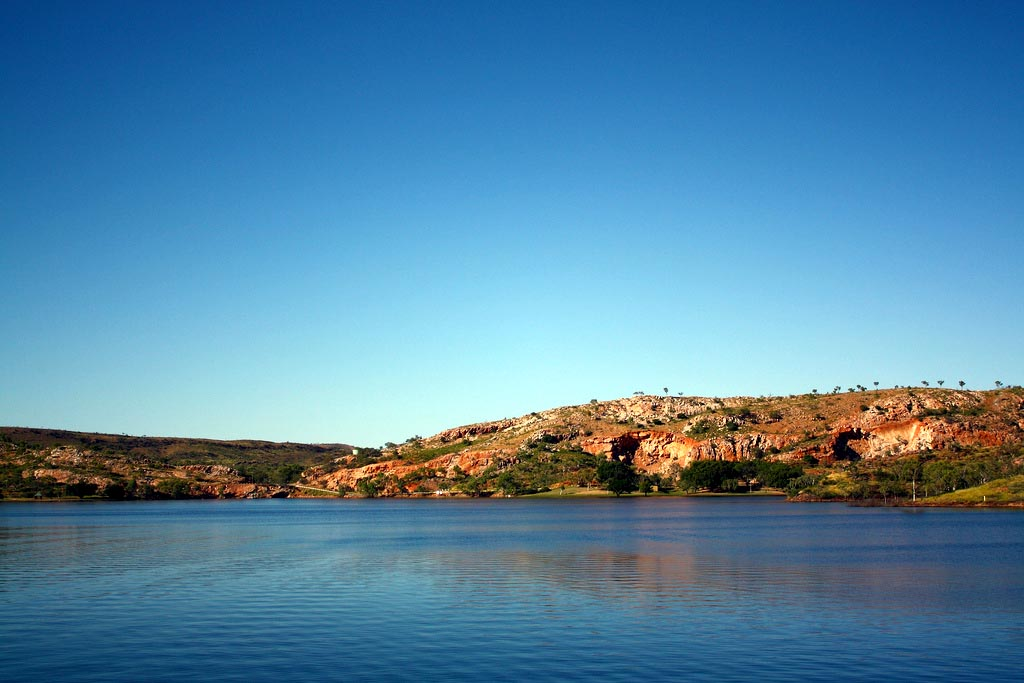
Lake Moondarra on the Leichhardt River, created in 1958.

In response to the increasing power demand from the MIM operations and from the growing city of Mount Isa, MIM constructed in 1960 a new power station near Mica Creek to add to the capacity of the Mines Power Station, which was located adjacent to the copper smelter. The Mines Power Station had itself been augmented over the years, starting with an output of five MW in 1931. It also, in 1958, constructed a new dam on the Leichhardt River to supply water to Mount Isa and the MIM operations and thus Lake Moondarra was created.

The Black Rock open cut began operating in March 1957 to produce copper ore. Until 1963, the Black Rock open cut produced copper oxide ore that was used as a flux in the copper smelter. Mining chalcocite ore started in 1963. The Black Rock open cut was closed prematurely in 1965 due to instability in its western wall. Mining was stopped 40 feet short of its planned final depth of 520 feet, causing a significant quantity of high-grade ore not to be recovered.

A new concentrator, which became known as the "No. 3 concentrator", was commissioned in 1963 to treat chalcocite ore from the Black Rock open cut.

Some of the ore mined from the Black Rock open cut could not be treated economically in the No. 3 concentrator, and about 750,000 tons of this low-grade material, containing an average grade of 1.5% copper, was stockpiled.

In March 1966, MIM consolidated its mining lease holdings by taking up all the territory between Hilton and the Mount Isa operations within a single Special Mining Lease and diamond drilling recommenced at Hilton. The Hilton reserve increased to 37 million tonnes.

Also in 1966, lead–zinc ore treatment was transferred to a new concentrator, referred to as the "No. 2 concentrator". That same year, there was a major modernization of the lead smelter, with the eight small sinter plants being replaced by a single updraft sinter plant, and a new shaft, originally known as the "K57" shaft but later renamed the "R62" shaft, was commissioned.

Until 1966, the zinc concentrate produced in the No. 1 concentrator was solar dried by pumping it to open drying dams and allowing the water to evaporate in the sun. It was recovered for shipment once it was sufficiently dry. A zinc concentrate filtration plant was commissioned in September 1966.

Treatment of lead–zinc ore in the No. 1 concentrator ceased in May 1967, with all of the lead–zinc ore subsequently being treated through the No. 2 concentrator.

In May 1969, MIM decided to proceed with the "Hilton mine", named in honour of Charles R. Hilton, an American who had been General Manager at the time of the discovery of the ore body that was to support it. The sinking of a 4.3 meter ("m") diameter exploration shaft (known as "J53") began in June 1970 and was completed to a depth of 630 m in June 1973. Sinking the "P49" service and hoisting shaft (8 m in diameter) began in 1971, and this shaft was completed to a depth of 1040 m in December 1975.

In March 1971, the practice of returning converter slag to the reverberatory furnaces to recover the contained copper was discontinued. The slag return was a problem because of the high level of magnetite ("Fe_{3}O_{4}") in the slag. Magnetite has a higher liquidus temperature than the iron oxide ("FeO") normally found in the reverberatory furnace slag and it precipitated, causing a growing accretion in the reverberatory furnace, thus reducing the storage capacity of the furnace. MIM changed its converter slag copper-recovery practice in 1971, and instead of returning all the hot converter slag to the reverberatory furnace, allowed some of the slag to cool slowly and then treated it in the copper concentrator to produce a converter slag concentrate. This improved operating conditions within the reverberatory furnace.

In 1972, MIM instituted an air quality monitoring system in Mount Isa, shutting down the smelter operations whenever the meteorological conditions were considered likely to lead the sulfur dioxide levels to exceed the USEPA standards within the city of Mount Isa. The air quality control system (known as the "AQC system") resulted in the loss of about 15% of the lead smelter's production and about 7.7% of copper production.

In 1973, a new copper concentrator, known as the "No. 4 concentrator" was commissioned to treat the copper ore (at a rate of six million tons per year of ore containing 3% copper and 55–60% silica) and the old No. 1 concentrator was shut down, and a new fluidized-bed roaster was installed in the copper smelter to replace the multiple hearth roasters that had been used since 1953. This raised the production of blister copper to 155,000 tons per year. The second reverberatory furnace was brought into permanent operation to treat additional calcine produced by the new roaster.

With the commissioning of the new roaster, the practice of adding hot converter slag to the reverberatory furnace ceased completely.

The replacement of the hearth roasters with the fluid-bed roaster meant that the amount of sulfur eliminated from the concentrate during the roasting process increased, raising the copper content ("matte grade") of the reverberatory furnace matte from 33–35% copper to 40–42% copper. This higher matte grade meant that less sulfur per tonne of concentrate treated in the smelter had to be eliminated in the converters, thus raising their effective capacity and allowing higher copper production from the smelter without adding additional converters.

The rate of ore production expanded in the years between 1953 and 1973, rising to 2.74 million tonnes in 1960, 3.65 million tonnes in the 1965–66 financial year, and plateauing for a time at 7.2 million tons per year (2.6 million tons per year of lead–zinc ore and 4.6 million tons per year of copper ore) in 1973.

=== Growth, innovation and consolidation (1973–2003) ===
The difficult nature of the Mount Isa ore bodies has meant that the company had always needed to be at the forefront of mining technology. It was, in 1962, a founding sponsor of the Australian Minerals Industry Research Association ("AMIRA") P9 mineral processing research project at the University of Queensland, which proved to be the foundation of the Julius Kruttschnitt Mineral Research Centre. Then, in the 1970s through to the 1990s, it became a world leader in developing new mining techniques and processing technologies as a response to declining metal prices and rising costs.

In 1978, MIM's copper refining subsidiary developed the Isa Process copper refining technology, which is now marketed as the IsaKidd process and globally regarded as the preferred copper refining technology, with over 100 licensees using the technology around the world. The Isa Process technology revolutionized copper refining by replacing copper cathode-starter-sheets with stainless steel sheets and allowing what had been a very labour-intensive process to be mechanised.

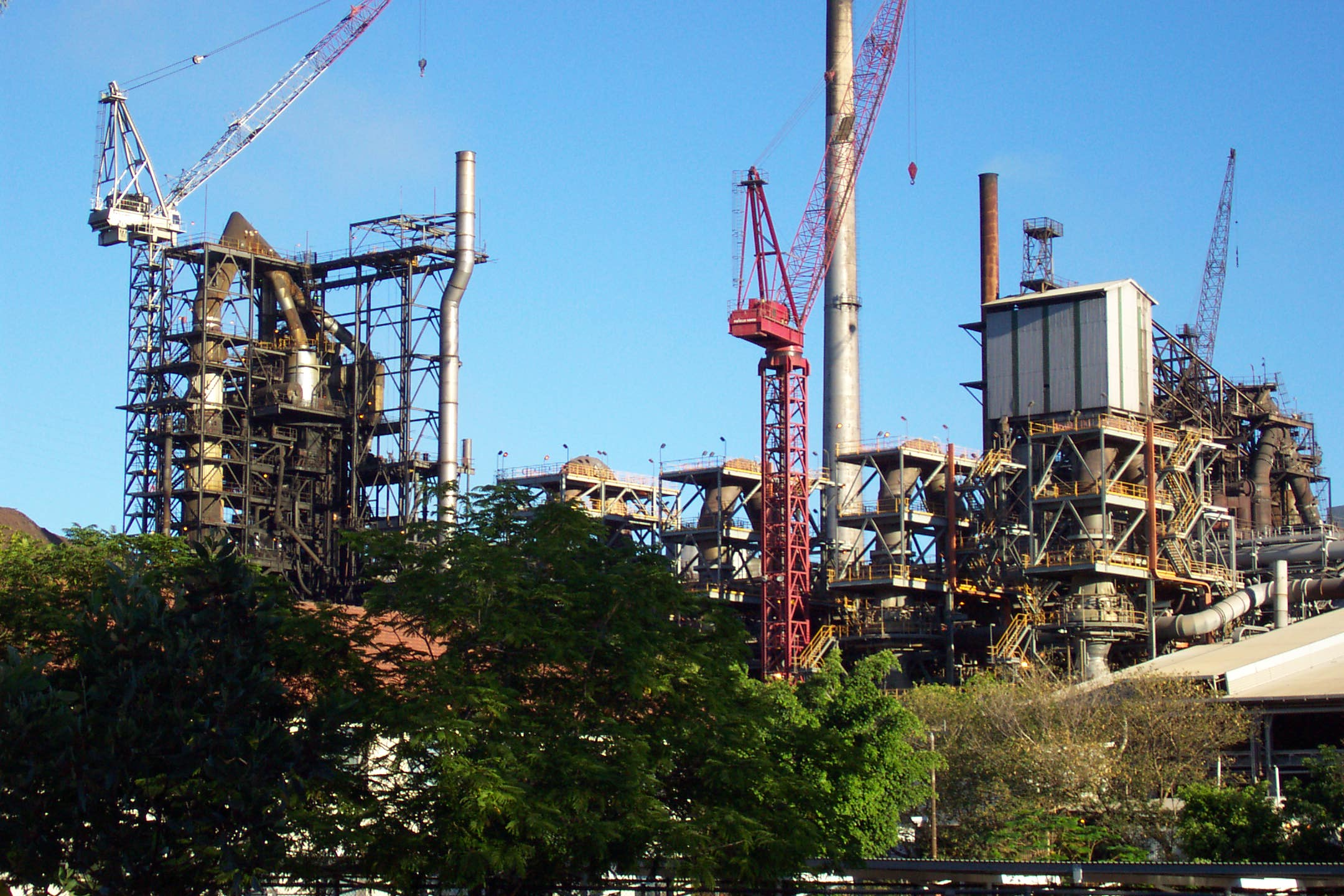
Mount Isa copper smelter in 2002. The building beneath the left-hand crane is the ISASMELT™ plant.

At the same time as it was developing the Isa Process tank house technology, MIM was starting the joint development, with the Australian government's Commonwealth Scientific and Industrial Research Organisation ("CSIRO"), of the energy-efficient ISASMELT™ smelting technology, based on the CSIRO's Sirosmelt lance. After laboratory testing of a potential lead smelting process at the CSIRO's Melbourne facilities, MIM moved to a 120 kg/h test rig in the Mount Isa lead smelter in 1980 and then to a five tonne per hour ("t/h") pilot plant in the lead smelter in 1983. This was followed by the development of a copper smelting process in the Mount Isa test rig and the construction of a 15 t/h copper ISASMELT™ demonstration plant in the copper smelter in 1987. With the success of lead pilot plant and the copper demonstration plant, both of which boosted MIM's metal output by being run by operations' personnel, MIM decided to market the ISASMELT™ technology. By 2013, there were 15 ISASMELT™ plants operating in 10 countries, including in the Mount Isa copper smelter.

In 1992, MIM commissioned an ISASMELT™ furnace in the Mount Isa copper smelter to treat 104 t/h of concentrate containing 180,000 t/y of copper. Its throughput was initially constrained because MIM chose to keep one of the two reverberatory furnaces operating and the converters became a bottleneck. The ISASMELT™ plant's throughput had to be restrained to allow enough material to flow through the reverberatory furnace to prevent the matte freezing in the bottom of the furnace. It was decided in 1997 to shut down the fluidized bed roaster and the reverberatory furnace, and the ISASMELT™ furnace throughput was boosted to more than 160 t/h of concentrates by the addition of a fourth Peirce-Smith converter and a second oxygen plant.

In 1985, MIM commissioned Professor Graeme Jameson of the University of Newcastle (Australia) to improve sparger design in flotation columns used as zinc concentrate cleaners in the zinc circuit of the lead–zinc concentrator. Arising from this work, Jameson developed the idea of mixing air and concentrate slurry in a pipe, referred to as the "downcomer", that was inserted into the flotation column. Further research showed that mixing the slurry and the air in the downcomer meant that much of the height of traditional flotation columns was unnecessary and the concept of the short "Jameson Cell" was born.

Jameson patented the idea in 1986 and a two tonne per hour ("t/h") pilot cell was tested in Mount Isa in 1986. In 1988, MIM decided to increase the capacity of its heavy medium plant slimes flotation circuit to improve lead recovery and, following investigations of various alternatives, installed two full-scale Jameson Cells in the lead–zinc concentrator in 1989. In April 1989, MIM Holdings acquired the world rights to the metallurgical applications of the Jameson Cell, began marketing the technology and continued to develop it. By 2005, there were 228 Jameson Cells operating globally in coal and base metal flotation circuits.

From the mid-1980s, there was a decline in the performance of the lead–zinc concentrator because the grain size of the ore was getting progressively finer. This meant that the ore needed to be ground even finer than it was to achieve separation of the valuable mineral particles from the unwanted ("gangue") minerals, and to separate the lead mineral particles from the zinc minerals. MIM investigated various existing fine grinding technologies (such as ball mills and tower mills) but found them to be uneconomic in the MIM application and also that the high consumption rate of the steel grinding medium resulted in iron contamination of the mineral surfaces, making them less susceptible to flotation recovery. Consequently, MIM sought to develop a better grinding technology, and the result was the joint development with Netzsch-Feinmahltechnik GmbH of a highly energy-efficient horizontal stirred-mill that became known as the IsaMill. The IsaMills typically use an inert grinding medium (such as ceramic balls, smelter slag or silica sand) and avoid the problem of inhibiting flotation of the fine particles with iron deposits.

After testing prototypes at various scales, the first full-scale IsaMill was installed in the Mount Isa lead–zinc concentrator in 1994, followed by others at Mount Isa and at the McArthur River mine in the Northern Territory in 1995. MIM decided to license the technology to other users in 1999, and the latest information available states there are 121 IsaMills installed in concentrators around the world.

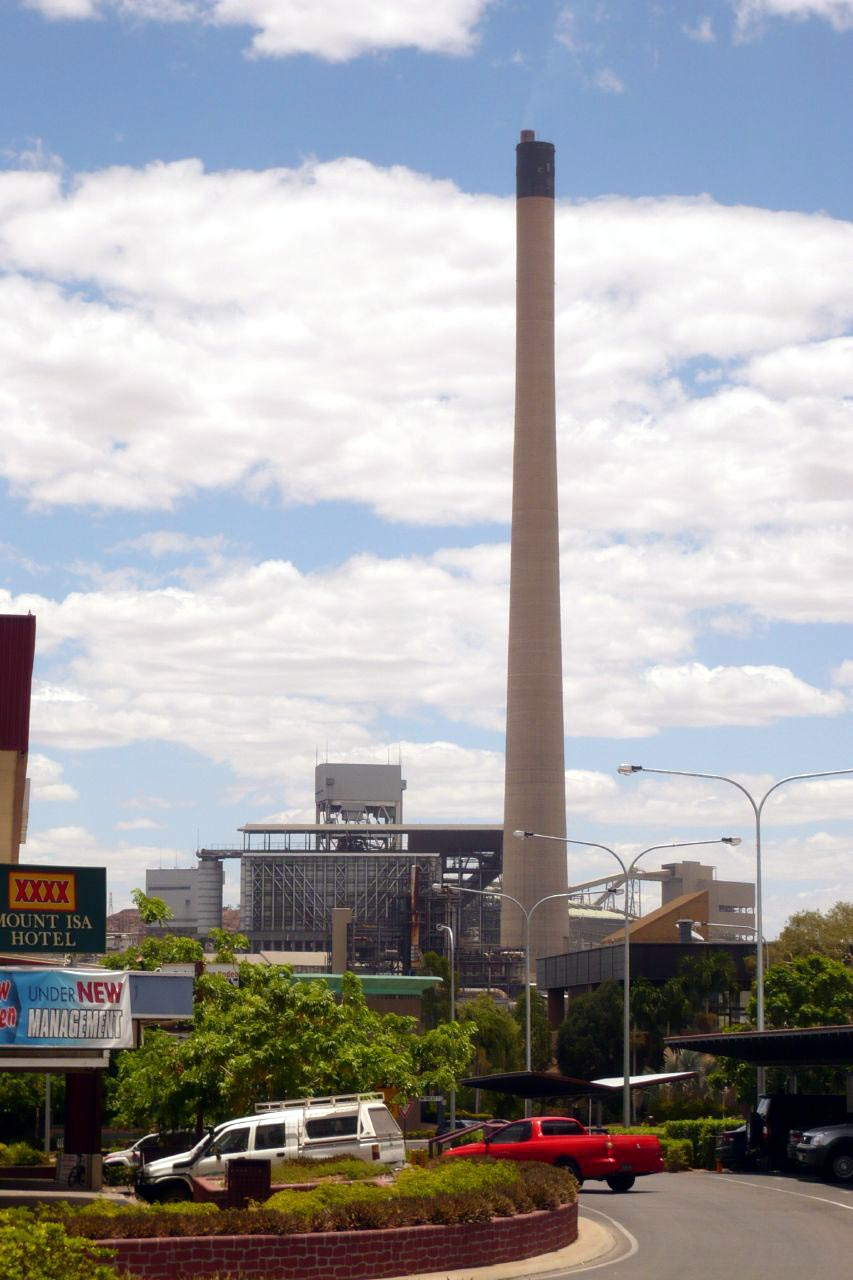
The 270 m lead smelter stack.

After the completion of the P49 shaft at Hilton in 1975, the project there was wound down due to a decline in the world prices for lead, zinc and silver. Some mine development activities were continued, but at a very low level.

In 1978, MIM built a new 270 m stack for its lead smelter, to reduce the effect of the AQC system on lead smelter production using the previous 76 m stack.

From its inception, the copper smelter had been producing blister copper, originally for sale and then for refining at MIM's copper refinery in Townsville. This changed in June 1979, when two 320 tonne capacity rotary "anode furnaces" and a Mitsui-design anode casting wheel were commissioned in the Mount Isa smelter. The move to end exporting cold blister copper from the Mount Isa smelter resulted in substantial energy savings, because the anode furnaces received molten blister copper from the converters, meaning that cold blister copper did not have to be reheated and melted before being cast into anodes for electrolytic refining.

Activity at Hilton ramped up again in 1981, when a permanent headframe was erected over the P49 shaft, but the project was again slowed due to another decline in lead prices and the increase of lead metal production from the Mount Isa operations due to the installation of a heavy medium plant in 1982.

The new heavy medium plant increased the capacity of the lead–zinc concentrator from 2.5 million t/y in the 1981–1982 financial year to 4.2 million t/y in the 1984–1985 financial year. It achieved this by removing lighter (unmineralised) rock fragments and rejecting them from the concentrator before they reached the grinding mills that were the bottleneck for the plant. The rejection rate was 30–35% of the incoming ore.

The increasing difficulty of separating the lead and zinc minerals meant that MIM began producing a mixed lead and zinc concentrate (known in the industry as a "bulk concentrate") at the beginning of 1986 and continued its production until late 1996. Payments by smelters to mining companies are lower for bulk concentrate due to the higher cost of running processes that can treat them. As the production of the bulk concentrate increased, so did the difficulty of finding a buyer. The zinc in the bulk concentrate was eventually worth only half of that in the zinc concentrate.

From 1987, ore from the Hilton mine was used to supplement the Mount Isa ore, and by 1992, the treatment rate of the No. 2 concentrator had reached five million t/y, with 30% coming from Hilton and 70% from the Isa mine.

In 1991, two semi-autogenous grinding mills ("SAG mills") were installed in the copper concentrator. This freed up two ball mills that were transferred to the No. 2 concentrator to increase the grinding capacity of that plant. Coupled with the installation of a tower mill and some new flotation capacity, the changes increased zinc recovery to zinc concentrate by over 15%.

In the late 1990s, production from the Mount Isa original Mount Isa ore bodies began to drop, with copper ore production from the upper ore bodies falling from five million tonnes in 1994 to approximately 3.5 million t/y by 2000 because of increased dependence on pillar extraction sequences and increased reliance on truck haulage. Production of ore from the Mount Isa lead mine dropped to 1.2 million t/y by 2002.

=== The Xstrata years (2003–2013) ===
Xstrata purchased Mount Isa Mines for a total of US$2.96 billion (A$4.93 billion), including assumed debt, in 2003.

Following the take-over, Xstrata split the Mount Isa operations into two separate streams: a copper stream and a lead-zinc-silver stream. The copper stream became part of Xstrata Copper and the lead-zinc-silver stream became part of Xstrata Zinc.

As production from the aging Mount Isa lead-zinc underground mine declined, MIM recommenced mining in the Black Star open cut, the site of some of MIM's earliest mining operations, in October 2004, aiming to maintain feed to the lead–zinc concentrator.

Underground operations in the Mount Isa lead mine ceased in December 2005, after 75 years of almost continuous operation.

=== The GlencoreXstrata and Glencore years (2013– ) ===
On 2 May 2013, Xstrata merged with Glencore to form Glencore Xstrata plc; and on 20 May 2014, Glencore Xstrata changed its name to Glencore plc. In October 2023, it was announced that all copper mining operations would cease by 2025. The closure was attributed to low-quality ore and was expected to affect 1,200 employees. The copper smelter would continue operations until 2030.

== Orebodies ==
Mount Isa contains two separate orebodies: a stratigraphically lower lead-zinc-silver ore horizon and an upper copper ore. Both are contained within the Lower Proterozoic Urquhart Shale. The Urquhart is 1,000 metres (3,300 ft) thick and is a grey dolomitic shale with tuffaceous horizons. Near the ore horizons the shale is pyritic. The orebodies are on one limb of a plunging anticline and are extensively faulted.

The ore occurs as en-echelon bodies parallel to the shale bedding. Orebodies may extend more than one kilometre along strike and three-fourths of a kilometre down dip. Thickness may reach 50 metres (160 ft). The ores are considered to be syn-genetic with the host shale and interbedded volcanic material.

=== Lead zinc silver ore ===
The primary ore consists of galena, iron rich sphalerite and tetrahedrite as ore minerals along with common accessories pyrite, pyrrhotite, quartz, carbonates and graphite. Minor arsenopyrite, marcasite, chalcopyrite, valleriite, proustite, polybasite and argentite also occur. Original surface oxidized ore contained cerussite, anglesite and pyromorphite. Silver and zinc were removed from the surface oxidized zone and were deposited as supergene ore at a depth above the primary ore.

=== Copper ore ===
Copper occurs in brecciated "silica-dolomite" rock. Primary minerals are chalcopyrite, pyrrhotite and arsenopyrite. minor amounts of cobaltite, marcasite, valleriite, chalcostibite, galena and others are reported.

== Production ==
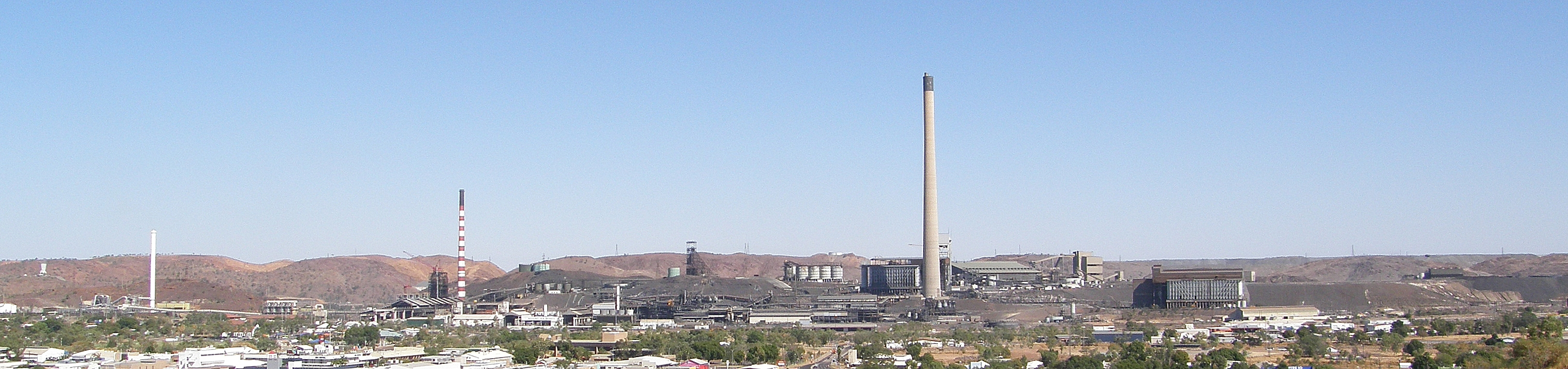
Mount Isa Mines, showing the acid plant stack (white, far left), copper smelter stack (red and white stripes, middle stack) and lead smelter stack (right stack).

- 6.1 million tonnes copper ore with 3.3% copper
- 4.6 million tonnes silver-lead-zinc ore with 154g/t silver 5.4% lead 6,5% zinc (1986)

== Criticism ==
=== Health and Human Safety Issues ===
Smelter operations release sulfur dioxide emissions very close to the city of Mount Isa. The Mount Isa Mines Panel Assessment Study recently spent 4 years investigating the air quality and the effects on community health. The panel found no evidence of adverse effects from the mine. However, the panel did not report on emissions of lead and several other metals associated with sulphur dioxide emissions and which are known to have potentially severe environmental and health effects. Mount Isa Mines is currently the highest atmospheric emitter of sulphur dioxide, lead and several other metals in Australia. Other research has confirmed that there has been widespread contamination of soils with lead, copper and other metals in and around Mount Isa and that these contaminants are derived from both historic and ongoing smelter emissions and fugitive dust from Mount Isa Mines. Queensland Health reported in 2008 that the average blood lead concentration for children (1–4 years old) in Mount Isa was five microgram/dL and 11.3% exceeded 10 microgram/dL. In comparison, average blood lead in children from uncontaminated comparable urban areas is around two microgram/dL. Recent medical research has documented adverse health effects at blood lead concentrations above five microgram/dL and possibly down to as low as two microgram/dL.

=== Tort ===
In September 2014 Sharlene Body won the rights to a civil trial against Xstrata for allegedly causing neurological damages to her son via neurotoxic emissions of lead.

== Awards ==
In 2010, Mount Isa Mines was inducted into the Queensland Business Leaders Hall of Fame.

== See also ==
- 1964 Mount Isa Mines strike
- Mining in Australia
