= Ian Morley =

Australian mining engineer and administrator

Ian Morley ISO (1904–1989) was an Australian mining engineer and administrator, who advocated for safe mining practices and reforms for the Australian mining industry.

== Early life ==
Ian Webster Morley was born on 20 March 1904 in Melbourne, Victoria, the only child of William Morley, a Methodist minister and his wife Grace Webster. He attended Trinity College (1910–1914) and Wesley college (1914–1921) in Melbourne before enrolling at the University of Melbourne. He took his Bachelor of Metallurgical Engineering degree in 1928 and Bachelor of Mining Engineering in 1929.

== Career ==
Morley was employed as an assistant surveyor from 1927 to 1928 with Broken Hill Ltd and was a field assistant on the Imperial Geophysical Experimental Survey between 1928 and 1929. He compiled a report with Harold Taylour on the Mandated Territory of New Guinea between 1931 and 1934 assessing gold mining opportunities in Morobe. Morley was acting superintendent of Mount Coolon Gold Mines NL in Queensland when a wage dispute led to a six-month shut down of the mine during a drought season. He became general manager of Georgetown Gold Mines NL, Queensland from 1935 to 1936 and Mount Kasi Mines Ltd in Fiji in 1936. He was subsequently mine foreman at Wiluna Gold Mines Ltd, Western Australia in 1937 and inspector of mines at Kalgoorlie in 1938–1939. He became assistant state mining engineer in Queensland in 1939 rising to the position of state mining engineer and chief inspector of mines in 1940. He helped to introduce a uniform code of safe mining practice. He and mining executives such as Julius Kruttschnitt II and Malcolm Newman lobbied for the establishment of a mining engineering degree at the University of Queensland in 1949.

From 1950 mining expanded in Queensland and Morley helped formulate policies on oil and natural gas development, and the opening of bauxite, uranium, mineral sands and large open cut coalmines in the state. He recommended the use of computerised drilling data, grid systems for exploration tenures as well as reforms to petroleum legislation and the establishment of a state energy board in the late 1960s. He served on the national council of the Australasian Institute of Mining and Metallurgy (AusIMM) between 1949 and 1952 and again after retiring from the Mines Department from 1969 to 1974. Morley was awarded the Imperial Service Order in 1969 for his service to the government. After his retirement from the state government Morley worked as a mining and petroleum consultant and completed the book, Black sands: a history of the mineral sand mining industry in Eastern Australia in 1981.

== Membership ==
1967–1971 – International Labour Office panel – safety in mines

1982 – Fellow of Australasian Institute of Mining and Metallurgy

== Personal life ==
Morley married Evelyn Marshall in 1937 in Kalgoorlie, Western Australia. After Evelyn's death in 1948, Morley married Janet Innes in Brisbane in 1950. He died in Brisbane on 11 September 1989, and was survived by the son and daughter of his first marriage.

Boxes of his papers are held in the Fryer Library of The University of Queensland Library, primarily related to his book Black sands. An annual prize has been awarded in his name since 1990 at the University of Queensland.
