= Ray Whitmore =

Ray Whitmore AM (1920–2008) was a British mining and metallurgical engineer and academic, who specialised in research into radar, mining and metallurgical engineering and mining heritage in England and Australia.

== Early life and education ==
Raymond Leslie Whitmore was born in Luton, England on 13 September 1920. He attended Handsworth Boys Grammar School. After completing school he joined the University of Birmingham as a laboratory assistant in the Department of Mining. He completed a BSc in physics from the University of London by external study, graduating in 1942. He was awarded the Sumpter Prize for Special Physics at the Central Technical College in 1941 which led to undertaking further study in the Department of Physics at the University of Birmingham. His field there was the emerging study of radar.

== War service ==
Whitmore enlisted with the RAF in 1943 and was posted to the officers radio location training facilities at Yatesbury, where he learned radar operations. He was posted to RAF Aberdaron where he took on many of the commanding officer duties to the 80 personnel stationed there. He was later posted to RAF Malvern where he was involved with radar development and the team producing counter measures against the German radar operations, devising new techniques to assist with the D-Day landings at Normandy.

== Professional career ==
After the war ended Whitmore returned to work at the university and was awarded his PhD in 1949. He was appointed senior lecturer in the Department of Mining and Fuels at Nottingham University in 1953. This appointment was financially supported by the National Coal Board. They were keen to encourage research into coal preparation and mineral dressing. Whitmore pursued research into the cleaning of coal, viscosity and sedimentation of material suspended in fluids. His research led to him being awarded a DSc by the University of Birmingham in 1959, following extensive publication of his findings. He was appointed to Reader within his department. He also lectured outside of the university in courses for the National Coal Board.

Whitmore's research extended beyond mining engineering. He published a paper with another academic on “The theory of the flow of blood in narrow tubes” in the American Journal of Physiology in 1959. This publication led to research in Great Britain and the United States on the behaviour of blood in the circulation system, which had parallels to his study of the flow of particles in his mineral research.

== Move to Australia ==
In 1967, Whitmore was appointed to the Chair of Mining and Metallurgical Engineering at the University of Queensland. His chief programs were to appoint new staff to the department as the mining boom was increasing demand for graduate engineers and to push forward with the move of the department to the St Lucia campus of the university. He developed links with industry which led to the establishment of a number of scholarships and support from MIM Holdings Ltd for the creation of a Mineral Research Centre. The Julius Kruttschnitt Mineral Research Centre was opened in 1970 to recognise the work of Kruttschnitt who had been a former chairman of MIM Holdings. It was located at the university's experimental mine site at Indooroopilly.

Whitmore pursued the creation of a chair in Metallurgy, and worked with the Department of Geology and Mineralogy to establish the Mineral Industry Advisory Committee which was chaired by industry representatives. He was Dean of the Faculty of Engineering between 1974 and 1975. He stepped back as head of the department in 1976 to remain Professor of Mining and Metallurgical Engineering and pursued the creation of several histories of the exploration of coal in Queensland and engineering heritage. He retired in 1985 and was made Emeritus Professor, a role which led him to pursue historical studies in Brisbane and Ipswich, including heritage studies of smelters in north Queensland, the Mount Crosby water treatment station and the Tower Mill at Spring Hill. He also undertook industrial archaeology studies of coke oven technologies, the Rhondda colliery and sawmill in the Ipswich region. He had contributed to over 40 historical papers and books during his later career.

== Personal life and legacy ==
Whitmore married Ruth Franklin in 1947. He died in Brisbane on 20 December 2008. He was survived by his wife and two sons.

Whitmore's professional papers were donated to the University of Queensland Fryer Library. A reading room at Engineering House Queensland was named for him.

== Memberships and other roles ==
- 1970–1974 – representative on the Australian Research Grants Commission
- 1976 – Engineering Heritage Panel, Engineers Australia, Queensland and National Division
- 1982 - Chairman of Engineers Australia, Queensland division
- 1991–2004 Member of Ipswich City Council Heritage Advisory Committee
- Member of Brisbane City Council Heritage Advisory Committee
- Board member, Queensland Museum Science Centre
- Advisory on mining education, Papua New Guinea University of Technology
- Member – Royal Historical Society of Queensland
- Member – Brisbane History Group
- Member – Queensland Heritage Council
- Trustee – Willis L. Haenke Foundation
- 1998 Honorary Fellowship, National Council
- Fellow – Australasian Institute of Mining an Metallurgy
- Life Member – Australian Coal Preparation Society

== Honours ==
- 1994 – Member of the Order of Australia for service to mining and metallurgical engineering and to engineering history, heritage and industrial archaeology
- 2005 – John Monash medal from Engineers Australia, for engineering heritage
