= Susan McDonald =

Australian politician (born 1970)

Senator Susan McDonald

Shadow Minister for Resources Shadow Minister for Northern Australia
- Incumbent
- Assumed office 17 February 2026
- Leader: Angus Taylor
- Preceded by: Dan Tehan (acting)
- In office 5 June 2022 – 21 January 2025
- Leader: Bridget McKenzie; Matt Canavan
- Preceded by: Madeleine King (as Shadow Minister for Resources); Murray Watt (as Shadow Minister for Northern Australia)
- Succeeded by: Dan Tehan (acting)

Deputy Leader of the Nationals in the Senate
- Incumbent
- Assumed office 21 July 2025
- Preceded by: Perin Davey

Special Envoy for Northern Australia
- In office 2 July 2021 – 23 May 2022
- Prime Minister: Scott Morrison

Senator for Queensland
- Incumbent
- Assumed office 1 July 2019
- Preceded by: Barry O'Sullivan

Personal details
- Born: Susan Eileen McDonald; 7 February 1970 (age 56) Brisbane, Queensland, Australia
- Party: National (federal); LNP (state)
- Relations: George Fisher (grandfather); Judy Gamin (aunt)
- Occupation: Accountant; Businesswoman

Susan Eileen McDonald (born 7 February 1970) is an Australian politician who has been a Senator for Queensland since 2019. She is a member of the Liberal National Party of Queensland (LNP) and sits with the National Party in federal parliament. She has a background in agribusiness.

== Early life ==
McDonald was born in Brisbane. Her father Don McDonald served as state and federal president of the National Party during the 1990s. The family company MDH Pty Ltd was established by her paternal grandfather Jim McDonald in the 1940s and runs numerous cattle stations across Queensland, spanning over 38,000 square kilometres (15,000 mi^{2}) as of 2013. Her maternal grandfather George Fisher was a prominent mining executive, while her aunt Judy Gamin was a Queensland state MP.

McDonald grew up on Devoncourt Station, located in the locality of Kuridala outside of Cloncurry. She began her schooling through the School of the Air based in Mount Isa before boarding at Stuartholme School in Brisbane. She later completed the degrees of Bachelor of Commerce and Bachelor of Economics from the University of Queensland.

== Career ==
McDonald is a chartered accountant. From 2014 to 2019 she served as managing director of Super Butcher, a subsidiary of her family business MDH which had five stores and employed 80 people as of 2016. She was appointed to the board of Beef Australia in 2016. She joined the council of the Royal National Agricultural and Industrial Association of Queensland in the same year.

== Politics ==
McDonald joined the National Party of Queensland at the age of 19. She served a term as state secretary beginning in 2003. When the party merged with the state Liberal Party in 2008, she became a founding trustee of the new Liberal National Party of Queensland (LNP). She served as chief of staff to Andrew Cripps, the Queensland Minister for Natural Resources and Mines from 2012 to 2015.

=== Senate ===
In July 2018 McDonald won LNP preselection for the Senate. She was elected to parliament at the 2019 federal election, to a term beginning on 1 July 2019, and sits in the Nationals partyroom. She serves on several Senate committees and is the chair of the rural and regional affairs and transport legislation committee.

McDonald reportedly voted for Barnaby Joyce in the 2021 Nationals leadership spill, despite having previously supported Michael McCormack. She was subsequently appointed as the Morrison government's Special Envoy for Northern Australia, a non-ministerial position.

In 2021, she supported a Senate inquiry into vegan food labels.

Following the Coalition's defeat at the 2022 federal election, McDonald was appointed to new opposition leader Peter Dutton's shadow ministry, with responsibility for the resources and Northern Australia portfolios, and was retained during Sussan Ley's shadow ministry.

In January 2026, following a recall of parliament to vote on the Combatting Antisemitism, Hate and Extremism (Criminal and Migration Laws) Bill 2026, McDonald resigned from the shadow ministry after crossing the floor to vote against the bill.

=== Political views ===
McDonald advocates the agricultural development of inland Australia. She has endorsed the assumptions of the Bradfield Scheme and supports the construction of the Hell's Gate Dam on the upper Burdekin River as well as the expansion of the existing Burdekin Dam. In March 2019 The Australian described her as "avowedly pro-coal".

McDonald has nominated Lawrence Springborg, Tim Fischer and Joh Bjelke-Petersen as political role models.

== Personal life ==
McDonald is a single mother to three children. She moved to Townsville after her election to parliament, having previously lived in the Brisbane suburb of Clayfield.

McDonald was diagnosed with COVID-19 in March 2020. She was only the third North Queenslander to contract the virus. She described it as a "mild case" and said she was unsure how she became infected.
