= 1994 Queen's Birthday Honours (Australia) =

The 1994 Queen's Birthday Honours for Australia were announced on Monday 13 June 1994 by the office of the Governor-General.

The Birthday Honours were appointments by some of the 16 Commonwealth realms of Queen Elizabeth II to various orders and honours to reward and highlight good works by citizens of those countries. The Birthday Honours are awarded as part of the Queen's Official Birthday celebrations during the month of June.

== Order of Australia ==
=== Companion (AC) ===
==== General Division ====
Recipient	Citation	Notes
Dr Peter Stephen Wilenski, AO	For service to international relations and to public sector reform, particularly through fostering the implementation of social justice and equity principles	
Emeritus Professor Bernhard Hermann Neumann	For service to the advancement of research and teaching in mathematics	
His Excellency the Honourable Richard Elgin McGarvie, QC	For service to the Crown as Governor of Victoria, to the law and to the community	
The Honourable Nicholas Frank Greiner	For service to public sector reform and management and to the community	

=== Officer (AO) ===
==== General Division ====
Recipient	Citation	Notes
Dr Bernard John Amos, AM	For service to medicine and to the development and delivery of health care services in Australia and Asia	
Professor Norman Albert Beischer	For service in the fields of obstetrics and gyaecology and for clinical research into the causes and prevention of maternal and prenatal deaths	
Emeritus Professor John Charles Caldwell	For service to the discipline of demography and to population policy and research	
Emeritus Professor William John Campbell	For service to education as a researcher, teacher and administrator	
William Thomas Cooper	For service to art and to ornithology as a natural history artist	
Professor John Victor Malcolm Coppleson	For service to medicine in the field of gynaecology, particularly the prevention and treatment of gynaecological cancer	
Professor Julian Henry Disney	For service to the development of economic and social welfare policy and to the law	
Professor Marshall John Edwards	For service to veterinary education and to research in the field of teratology	
Dr Ruth Marcia English	For service to public health through the development of national food and nutrition policies	
Professor Richard Douglas Gordon	For service to medicine in the field of endocrine causes of hypertension	
Dr Nigel John Gray, AM	For service in the field of preventative medicine, particularly against cancer	
Emeritus Professor Geoffrey Colin Harcourt	For service to economic theory and to the history of economic thought	
Professor Laurence Thomas Hergenhan	For service to Australian literary scholarship and to education	
Associate Professor Michael Sydney Talbot Hobbs	For service to medicine in the field of public health through research and teaching	
Warwick John Hood	For service to the maritime industry as a naval architect	
David Alexander Hunt, QPM	For service to the South Australian Police Department and to the community	
The Honourable Mr Justice Geoffrey Alexander Kennedy	For service to the law, to education and to the community	
Dr Aila Inkeri Keto	For service to conservation, particularly through promoting the protection and management of the wet tropical rainforests of Queensland	
Yolanda Klempfner	For service to the community, particularly in the areas of tertiary education, youth and health	
Simon Sui-hee Lee	For service to the development of Australian-Asian trade relations and to the Chinese community	
Emeritus Professor Geoffrey William Lennon	For service to marine science, particularly in the field of sea level research and tidal predictions	
Dr John Kenneth Leslie	For service to agronomy, particularly crop science and to agriculture	
Keith William Lewis, CB	For service to the national programmes of research in the area of water resource management	
The Honourable Justice John Stanley Lockhart	For service to the law and to the community in the areas of education and the arts	
Kenneth Vincent Loughnan	For service to business and to telecommunications	
Dr Jakob Malmo	For service to veterinary science and education and to the dairy industry	
The Honourable Justice Jeffrey Allan Miles	For service to the law and to the community	
The Honourable Kevin Eugene Newman	For service to the community, particularly through the provision of health care services and the preservation of cultural heritage, and to the Australian Parliament	
Dr Connie Lynne Peck	For service to psychology and to peacemaking and conflict resolution theory and practice	
David Ford Scott	For service in the fields of social welfare, international aid and the environment	
Patricia Marietje Thomas	For service to the science of zoology in both research and teaching and to the development of the Australian Helminthological Collection	
Alastair Hugh Urquhart, CBE	For service to business and finance and to the community	
Edmund Marks (Wolfe) Visbord, OBE	For service to the public sector, particularly in the areas of economic reform and economic policy development	
Lawrence John Willett	For service to public administration, to education and to the community	
Dean Robert Wills, AM	For service to business and commerce and to the community	

==== Military Division ====
Branch	Recipient	Citation	Notes
Navy	Rear Admiral Alwynne Richard Owen Rowlands, RFD RD	For distinguished service and exceptional performance of duty to the Royal Australian Navy and the Australian Defence Force, particularly as the Judge Advocate General	
Air Force	Air Vice Marshal Franklin David Cox	For service to the Royal Australian Air Force, particularly as Assistant Chief of the Air Staff, Personnel and Resource Management	

=== Member (AM) ===
==== General Division ====
Recipient	Citation	Notes
The Honourable Dr Nigel Drury Abbott	For service to the community, particularly through local government and to the Tasmanian Parliament	
Dr Ellis William Abrahams	For service to medicine, particularly in the control of tuberculosis	
Dr Ross McDonald Anderson	For service to neuropathology	
Murray Armstrong	For service to the development of the tourism and hospitality industry	
John Howard Barclay	For service to international relations in the Asian region, particularly through the provision of humanitarian relief to Nepal	
Peter George Barrack	For service to the community and industrial relations	
Dr Brian Harold Bartlett	For service to medicine, particularly in the field of dermatology	
Harry Baynes	For service to the banking industry, to business and to the community	
Timothy Gibson Bowden	For service to broadcasting	
Dr Mary Hector Bremner	For service to medicine, particularly in the field of ophthalmology and to the preservation of Australian flora and fauna	
Edmund George Capon	For service to the arts, particularly as Director of the Art Gallery of New South Wales	
Raymond Thomas Chapman, MBE	For service to the community and philately	
The Right Reverend Adrian Owen Charles	For service to the community through the Anglican Church of Australia	
John Arthur Chiswell	For service to industry, particularly through the Furniture Manufactures Association of Australia	
John Ronald Coghlan	For service to the building and construction industry	
Dr Kenneth Ernest Collins	For service to public health in Australia and Asia	
Stephen Comino	For service to conservation and to law, particularly as it affects the environment	
Noel Alexander Crichton	For service to the printing and grafic arts industries and to training within these industries	
Donald Albert Cushion	For service to music and industrial relations through the Musicians Union of Australia	
David Anthony de Carvalho	For service to the law and to the community	
Nicholas Frederick Derera	For service to the development of the Australian cotton industry and the continued development of the Australian wheat industry	
Nigel Alexander Dick	For service to the media, particularly through television and to the community	
Mark Francis Dohrmann	For service to people with disabilities, particularly through the Technical Aid to the disabled	
Angus Alan Downie	For service to the disabled in Tasmania and as a member of the Disability Advisory Council of Australia	
Dr Aldo Victor Dreosti	For service to medicine, particularly in the field of anaesthesia	
Harold Charles Eagleton	For service to the Public Service	
Professor Creswell John Eastman	For service to medicine, particularly in the field of endocrinology	
Leslie John Eggington	For service to industrial relations	
Dr James Morrison Ellis	For service to medicine, particularly orthopaedic surgery	
John Brehmer Fairfax	For service to the community and to the media	
Dr Graeme Blatchford Frecker	For service to local government	
Kathleen Carina French	For service to the community	
Robert Fulton	For service to the sport of rugby league	
Eric Leslie Garner	For service to the resource development industry and to international trade	
Rosalie Gascoigne	For service to the arts, particularly as a sculptor	
Dr Cherry Joan Gertzel	For service to Australian/African relations as an educator, researcher and advisor to government and community air organisations	
Donald Morrison Grant, RFD	For service to surveying	
The Right Reverend James Alexander Grant	For service to the Anglican Church of Australia	
Malcolm Neil Forsyth Gray	For service to the vegetable processing industry and to the community	
Warren Albert Grimshaw	For service to education	
Henry Baynton (Joe) Gullett, MC	For service to the community, particularly through the National Trust, the Australian War Memorial Council and the Australian Parliament	
Eilene Hannan	For service to opera	
Leon De Witt Henry	For service to engineering, particularly through the management of water resources	
Dr Reuben Hertzberg, CBE	For service to ophthalmic research and training through the establishment of the Chair of Ophthalmology at the University of New South Wales	
Brian John Hill	For service to public administration, particularly in the areas of institutional reform and policy advice	
Robin Kenneth Hood	For service to sport	
Brigadier Ian Murray Hunter, CVO MBE	For service to the community, particularly through the Australian Red Cross Society	
Dr Brian Peter Hurley	For service to medicine, particularly in the field of nephrology	
Darvell Martin Hutchinson	For service to the community	
Lesley Anne Huxley	For service to the Nursing Mothers' Association of Australia	
Harvey Gordon Jacka	For public service	
Earl Bruester McDonald James	For service to surveying, to local government and to the community	
Theodore John Kannis, OBE BEM	For service to the community particularly through the Australian Pensioners League	
Lucy Napaljarri Kennedy	For service to the Yuendumu community	
Philip Christian Koperberg, BEM	For service to the community through co-ordinating and controlling the firefighting effort during the New South Wales bushfires of January 1994	
Helen L'Orange	For service to women and to local government	
Gerhard (Gerry) Levy	For service to the Jewish community	
Kathleen Mary Lowe	For service to the community, particularly as Queensland and National President of the Meals On Wheels Service	
Helen Ann Lynch	For service to finance and banking	
Shirley Ma	For service to the Chinese community, particularly through the Chinese Elderly Welfare Society of Victoria	
John Robert Marsden	For service to the Law Society of New South Wales and to the community	
Professor John Duncan Mathews	For service to medical research	
Associate Professor Francis Thomas McDermott	For service to the community, particularly in accident prevention and treatment of road trauma victims	
Dr John Alexander McDonell	For service to education, particularly through the University of the Third Age	
Daniel Philip McElligott, MBE	For service to the community and to international relations	
Lyndall Alexandra McLean	For service to international relations	
Ronald Neville McLeod	For public service, particularly as Deputy Secretary of the Department of Defence	
Professor Constantine Agapitos Michael	For service to medicine and medical education, particularly in the fields of obstetrics and gynaecology	
Robert Johnston Mierisch	For service to the building and construction industry and to the community	
Mary Patricia Miller	For service to the community, particularly to the physical and financial welfare of aged people	
The Honourable Brian Kirkwell Miller	For service to the Tasmanian Parliament and to the community	
Peter Richard Mitchell	For service to the community, particularly to youth and in the area of stroke research	
Stuart Gwyn Morgan	For service to the manufacturing industry and to the community	
Father Gregory John O'Kelly	For service to education, particularly as headmaster of St Ignatius College, Riverview	
Gerald Page-Hanify	For service to the telecommunications industry	
Dr William Robert Parker	For service to medicine in the area of orthopaedic surgery and orthopaedic education	
Joan Margaret Phipson	For service to children's literature	
Emeritus Professor Peter Clarence Reade	For service to dental medicine, surgery and education	
Professor Kenneth Bruce Reinhard	For service to art and to art education	
Judith Catherine Rodriguez	For service to Australian literature, particularly in the area of poetry	
Christine Anne Ronalds	For service to women, particularly in the area of anti-discrimination and affirmative action	
Norman John Rowe	For service to the community, to veterans and to the entertainment industry	
Dr Steven (Istvan) Salamon	For service to the sheep breeding industry, particularly in the area of artificial insemination and semen preservation	
John Desmond Singleton	For service to the community through personal support and fundraising activities for charitable, sporting and research organisations	
Jim Leonard Smith	For service to community health and to education	
The Honourable Justice Paul Leon Stein	For service to environment law and to the community	
Babette Stephens, MBE	For service to the performing arts	
Margaret Stewart	For service to the community as a patron of the arts, particularly through the National Gallery of Victoria	
Ronald Strahan	For service to zoology and to advancing understanding of Australia's natural biological heritage	
Henry Maurice Tankard	For service to the dried fruits industry	
The Honourable Justice James Burrows Thomas	For service to the law, particularly legal ethics and to music education	
Dr Gad Trevaks	For service to health care administration and to medicine	
Professor Barbara van Ernst	For service to education	
Dr Robert Lyn Vickery	For service to education and to the performing arts	
Kerry Ann Walker	For service to the performing arts	
Raymond Richard Walker	For service to community health	
Kevin Ernest Weldon	For service to the publishing industry and to water safety as President of World Life Saving	
Emeritus Professor Raymond Leslie Whitmore	For service to mining and metallurgical engineering and to engineering history, heritage and industrial archaeology	
Dr Maxwell John Whitten	For service to entomology	
Maurice John Williams	For service to business and industry	
Dr Pauline Wilson	For service to hospital administration and to medicine	
Emeritus Professor Bernard Christopher Wolff	For service to education and to the community	
Roger Corfield Anson Wotton	For service to the community and to the New South Wales Parliament	

==== Military Division ====
Branch	Recipient	Citation	Notes
Navy	Captain Crispin Fletcher George	For exceptional service and devotion to duty with the Royal Australian Navy, particularly as the Commander, Naval Communications Station Harold E. Holt	
Navy	Commodore David York	For exceptional service and devotion to duty with the Royal Australian Navy, particularly as the Chief of Logistics Naval Support Command	
Army	Lieutenant Colonel Noel Geoffrey Adams	For service to the Australian Army, particularly in the 7th Signal Regiment	
Army	Colonel Philip George Kearsley	For exceptional service and devotion to duty with the Australian Army in the field of base logistics and in particular materiel management and commercial support	
Army	Major Michael Joseph Kelly	For exceptional service and devotion to duty with the Australian Army, particularly as a legal officer with headquarters 1st division and on operations in Somalia	
Army	Lieutenant Colonel David Thomas Kings RFD	For exceptional service and devotion to duty with the Australian Army Reserve, particularly as the Commanding Officer of 6th Field Ambulance	
Army	Lieutenant Colonel Brian Wallace Millen	For exceptional service and devotion to duty with the Australian Army, particularly as Commanding Officer 1st Aviation Regiment	
Army	Brigadier Vivian Alexander Morgan	For distinguished service and devotion to duty with the Australian Army and in particular as Commander 2nd Military District and Chief of Staff Training Command	
Army	Lieutenant Colonel Michael Francis Peebles RFD	For exceptional service and devotion to duty with the Australian Army and in particular as Commanding Officer of the 4th/3rd Battalion The Royal New South Wales Regiment	
Army	Lieutenant Colonel Wayne Bruce Sercombe	For exceptional service and devotion to duty with the Australian Army, particularly in the fields of education and training	
Air Force	Wing Commander Peter John Bevan	For service to the Royal Australian Air Force, particularly as Commanding Officer No 1 Radar Surveillance Unit	
Air Force	Group Captain James Wilson Downing	For service to the Royal Australian Air Force, particularly as Director Electronics Section, Defence Intelligence Organisation	
Air Force	Wing Commander Ronald Ian McDonald	For exceptional service and devotion to duty with the Royal Australian Air Force, particularly as Commanding Officer No 1 Central Ammunition Depot	
Air Force	Squadron Leader James Young Walker	For exceptional service and devotion to duty with the Royal Australian Air Force, particularly as Staff Officer in the Technical Trade Restructure Project	
Air Force	Wing Commander Gregory Douglas Weekes	For exceptional service and devotion to duty with the Royal Australian Air Force and Australian Army, particularly as the Divisional Air Liaison Officer, Headquarters 1st Division	

=== Medal (OAM) ===
==== General Division ====
Recipient	Citation	Notes
Panagiota Katholiki Anastasas	For service to the Greek community	
Shirley Aldythea Andrews	For service to folklore through the study of Australian traditional social dancing	
Richard Albert Armitage	For service to vocational education and training in Victoria	
Frederick Clarence Armstrong	For service to the community, particularly through Maroondah Social Health Centre and the Copelen Child and Family Services	
Jean Alison Austin	For service to the community	
Kevin Ashley Bacon	For service to equestrian sport	
Helen Christina Baker	For service to children and adolescents with psychological disorders and special needs	
Ivan Baker	For service to the Aboriginal community	
Basil Anastase Baramilis	For service to the Greek community	
Wayne James Bennett	For service to the sport of rugby league, particularly as coach of the Brisbane Broncos	
William Scott Best	For service to the care of the aged	
John David Bishop	For service to music education, particularly through the South Australian Music Camp Association	
Edward Richard Webster Blackmore, MBE	For service to the Queensland Blinded Soldier's Association	
Lavanda Gordon Blakeney	For service to the community	
Joyce Lillian Blewitt	For service to music education	
Dr John Frank Boas	For service to sport, particularly as an athletics coach	
Laima Bogens	For service to the Ethnic Communities Council of South Australia, particularly in the area of aged support services	
Colin John Bond	For service to motor sport	
Roy George Bradshaw	For service to the community and local government	
Donald Gillies Browne, MBE	For service to veterans	
Ian Sterry Browne	For service to cycling	
Glenis Beverley Bryan	For service to the hearing impaired	
Lina Bryans	For service to the arts as a modernist painter	
Reginald Bryant	For service to the community	
Beverley Joan Byron	For service to the community	
Kelvin Pattison Carr	For service to the community, particularly through the Uniting Church and Rotary International	
Sister Scholastica Josefine Carrillo	For service to the Aboriginal community at Kalumburu Mission	
Nell Challingsworth	For services to the performing arts in the field of dance	
Terri Charlesworth	For service to ballet and the teaching of classical dance	
Shirley Jean Cheshire	For service to women, particularly through the National Council of Women of Victoria and to youth	
Peter Campbell Church	For service to the promotion of business relations between Australia and the South East Asian region	
Sister Mary Visitation Cidad	For service to the Aboriginal community at Lakumburu Mission	
Patricia Clare Clough	For service to the community, particularly through the Catholic Women's League	
Daniel Albert Cole	For service to veterans	
Tjikalyi Collins	For service to the Aboriginal community	
Peter Bertram Colthup	For service to athletics, particularly the Victorian Veteran's Athletic Club	
Maxwell Gordon Colwell	For service to Australian literature	
Estelle Wren Cooper	For service to the community, particularly through the Ku-ring-gai Old People's Welfare Association	
Leslie Gordon Cowie	For service to the sport of rugby league football	
Vincent Arthur Crow	For service to heritage conservation	
James Trevor Dagley	For service to the community	
Judith Ann Dau	For service to the community, particularly the emotional well-being of aged and isolated people	
Patricia May Davies	For service to local government and to the community	
Geraldine Rosalie Davis	For service to the sport of target rifle shooting and to the community	
Donald Francis de San Miguel	For service to local government and to the community	
Ian Christopher Diehm	For service to the RSPCA, Queensland	
Kevin Donald	For service to youth	
Stanley Thomas Downs	For service to the community and local government	
Patricia Mary Dryden	For service to the Girl Guides Association, Queensland	
Nigel Adrian Du Pre Chamier	For service to the real estate and property industry	
Ruth Kathleen Dunbar	For service to music, particularly Australian jazz, and to the community	
Arthur Chiswell Dutch	For service to the Scout Association of Australia	
Ninette Clarice Dutton	For service to the community and to the arts as an artist, particularly as an enameller	
Jill Denise Earner	For service to distance education	
Ramon Gary Epstein	For service to the sport of weightlifting and to people with physical disabilities	
The Reverend Father James Michael Esler	For service to the Roman Catholic Church and to theological education	
Douglas Edward Fahey	For service to industry, particularly the National Plastics and Rubber Industry Training Council	
Robert Hilson Fisher	For service to entomology, particularly through the conservation of endangered species of butterflies in SA	
Cyril Flood	For service to the community, particularly through fundraising for charitable organisations	
Keep Fong	For service to the Chinese community	
Raymond Patrick Foster	For service to the Aboriginal community	
Wilton Foster	For service to the Aboriginal community	
Donald Fraser	For service to the Aboriginal community	
Max Frost	For service to veterans	
Joseph Richard Gailey	For service to the community, particularly the welfare of cancer patients	
Brother Michael Basil Gallagher	For service to education	
Frank Gardner	For service to driver education and motor sport	
John Garfield	For service to the community as an entertainer and compere assisting organisations with fundraising	
Nancy Russell Gemmell	For service to conservation, local history and the community	
Dr Edward John Giblin	For service to the community	
Richard James Gill	For service to music education	
Lyle John Gilligan	For service to the community	
Brian Robert Golledge	For service to junior soccer	
Frederick Spencer Grace	For service to the sport of rowing	
Councillor Peter Graham	For service to local government and to the community	
Sydney Matthew Grant, DFC	For service to veterans and to the community	
Elsa Noeline Braham Gray	For service to the community and to local government	
Irvine Heber Green	For service to community history, particularly through the Doncaster/Templestowe Society	
Therese Maryann Greenslade	For service to the aged	
Alexander John Grieve	For service to community music	
Anne Mcfadden Haines	For service to women, particularly through the War Widows Guild of Australia	
Barry Richard Halpin	For service to community health and to hospital administration	
Betty Thelma Handley	For service to scouting and to the Anglican Church of Australia	
Oriel Ethel Handley	For service to education through Moreton Bay College Wynnum	
Colin William Harman	For service to the preservation of native orchids and ferns and to the Green Mountains Botanic Gardens	
Audrey Jean Harris	For service to women's lawn bowls	
Joseph Wesley Hawkins	For service to the Pony Club movement and to Riding for the Disabled, Wagga Wagga	
Donald William Hayden	For service to local government and to the community	
Kenneth William Hayes	For service to farm management and to land regeneration	
Gwenyth Whitmee Hazelton	For service to the community	
Henry John Heath, RFD VRD	For service to veterans, particularly through the Naval Association of Queensland	
Walter Henry Heinz	For service to aged people, to sport and to the Anglican Church of Australia	
Douglas Ray Henderson	For service to conservation, to sport and to the community	
Elaine Henry	For service to community health, particularly as Executive Director of the New South Wales Cancer Council	
Norman Stanley Herold	For service to the West Australian State Emergency Service and to the community	
William Thomas Hill	For service to the pastoral industry	
Lancelot Thomas Hogg	For service to accountancy and to the Baptist Union of Queensland	
Albert Cecil Howard	For service to golf	
Vera Doreen Humphrey	For service to the Gulgong District Hospital and to the community	
Nancy Iredale	For service to animal welfare, particularly through the Cat Protection Society of NSW	
Norman Bambling Jackson	For service to the broadcasting industry and to the community	
Constance Waratah Jasinskas	For service to the community	
Ronald Arthur Jenkins	For service to cycling	
Ruth May Jensen	For service to the emotional and psychological needs of children in hospital through the "Ward Grannies" scheme at the Royal Alexandra Hospital for Children	
Oliver Merlyn Jones, ED	For service to the Cambodian people of Western Australia, to sport and to the community	
William Jules Joris	For service to children, particularly through the Christian Children's Fund of Australia	
Atunaisa Otutoa Kalamafoni	For service to homeless youth	
Janice Ann Kelly	For service to the community	
Richard George Kerr	For service to the Vietnamese community and to business	
Alison Robyn Kerr-Jones	For service to education and to the community	
James Sidney Kerrigan	For service to community health	
Anthony Albert King	For service to arts administration	
John Ferris Kirkpatrick	For service to the community and to local government	
Rosetta Kleem	For service to veterans and to ex-servicewomen	
Brent Peter Lacey	For service to community health, particularly through the Red Ribbon Project	
George Lakis	For service to the Greek community	
Erminio Antonio Lamarra	For service to local government and to the community	
Andrew Alfred Lavers	For service to the community health, as founder of the Alzheimer's Association of Western Australia	
Myra Jean Law	For service to community music	
Sylvia Laxton	For service to the Country Women's Association of Queensland	
Letitia Anne Leach	For service to community service groups, particularly the Australian Red Cross Society	
Marjorie Leitch	For service to the Gympie State High School and Parents and Citizens Association	
Patricia Evelyn Lemcke	For service to arts administration	
Geoffrey Henry Lemcke	For service to arts administration	
Ronald Hugh Lewis	For service to the community and to the public health system	
James Francis Logan	For service to the community	
Dr Thomas Brendan Lynch	For service to medicine	
Kenneth Forbes Macdonald	For service to Australian rules football	
Donald George Mackrill	For service to fire and emergency services	
Patricia Mary Maguire	For service to the Society of St Vincent de Paul	
Rose Manches	For service to children with physical disabilities	
John Alexander Martin	For service to emergency services and to local government	
Peter Addison Masters	For service to youth through the Duke of Edinburgh's Award Scheme	
James Roy Masters	For service to conservation and the environment	
Allen Joseph Matthews	For service to local government	
Dorothy May McCallum	For service to the community	
William Watson McColl	For service to the promotion of the Australian entertainment industry and to the media	
John Albert McCormack	For service to the community and to local government	
Vivienne Frances McCutcheon	For service to the community in the fields of social welfare, education and health	
Duncan James McDonald	For service to the community and to local government	
William Angus McDonald	For service to local government	
Anthony Michael McGrane	For service to local government, to industry development and to the community	
Heather McGregor	For service to the protection of women and children subjected to domestic violence	
Alec Frederick McIntosh	For service to local government and to the community	
Brother Steven David McLaughlin	For service to education as Principal of St Joseph's College (Nudgee College) and to the community	
Heather Aida McManis	For service to the community, particularly through St John Ambulance Australia (WA) and to ex-servicewomen	
Donald Charles McRae	For service to local government and to the community	
Hugh Ian Millar	For service to aged people	
Ronald Stanley Moore	For service to the community	
William (Bill) Moore	For service to aged people	
Ruby Letitia (Lettie) Morelle	For service to women, particularly through the Queensland Ladies' Bowling Association and the Association of Women's Forum Clubs of Australia	
Dr John James Morrissey	For service to medicine, particularly through improving standards of health care for women in North Queensland	
Mary Teresa Muir	For service to the community	
William Patrick Murphy	For service to the community and to veterans	
Margaret Stuart Murray	For service to the Girl Guides Association (NSW)	
Frederick Robert Myles	For service to the community	
Arthur Leslie Nelson	For service to the community, particularly through the Uniting Church	
Alexander Fraser Nelson	For service to youth through the Scout Association of Australia	
Bruce Nelson	For service to veterans	
Mervyn Stanley Neumann	For service to the community through the Colthup Home for aged people and to the Leichhardt Baptist Kindergarten and Preschool	
Dr Mary Creighton Nixon	For service to the profession of psychology and to the Australian Psychology Society	
Donald Francis Orgill	For service to the wool industry as a judge of sheep shearing competitions	
Alan Clifford Overton	For service to the Parramatta Rugby League Football Club and to the community	
Ronald Murray Papps	For service to the racing industry as a race commentator and to the community	
William Edward Peacock	For service to the hairdressing industry and to the development of standards for apprenticeship training	
Jessie Mildred Peart	For service to the community particularly through the Keilor Road Uniting Church Kindergarten and Orana Family Services Council	
Lance Arthur Phillips	For service to the Jewish community	
Dr Edmund John Pickford	For service to the community and to dentistry	
Myra Jean (Bonnie) Pierce	For service to the community of the Wingecarribee Shire	
Eunice Wilhelmine Pollock	For service to nursing through the treatment and management of spinal cord injuries	
Dr David Carington Pope	For service to the community particularly through the Medical Benevolent Association of New South Wales	
Ian David Purse	For service to the community through the development of youth programs and counselling services	
Norman Neil Rachinger	For service to people with disabilities through Karingal, Inc. and the Noah's Ark Toy Library (Geelong)	
Margaret Joan Ramsay	For service to veterans through the Returned and Services League (South Australian Branch)	
Patrick Gabriel Reid	For service to veterans through the Returned and Services League, Gladesville Sub-Branch, and the Ex-Prisoners War Association (NSW)	
Pauline Neura Reilly	For service to ornithology	
David John Rennie	For service to boxing, particularly through the Australian National Boxing Federation	
Douglas Buist Rennie	For service to soccer	
Alice Mildred Roach	For service to the community	
Mary Edith Robson	For service to the Essy Swar Red Cross Kiosk, Royal Melbourne Hospital	
John Sidney Ross	For service to the tourism and hospitality industry, particularly through the Australian Hotels Association	
Clarence Silver Rowe	For service to veterans and to the community	
Edna Eileen Royal	For service to the United Ex-Servicewomen's Association, Rockhampton	
John Douglas Russell	For service to music, particularly as artistic director of the Barossa Music Festival	
Helen Florence Russell Sage	For service to early childhood education	
Claudia Santilli	For service to the Italian community, particularly through the Co As It Ladies Committee	
Michael Desmond Scanlan	For service to the Sunshine Coast Helicopter Rescue Service and to the community	
William Gustave Schuberg, Rfd	For service to youth through the Air Training Corps, New South Wales Squadron	
David Scott	For service to veterans through the Returned and Services League Granville Sub-Branch	
Heather Janette Scraggs	For service to hockey	
Barry James Seaman	For service to veterans, particularly through the South East Asian and Korean Veterans' Association	
Kenneth Girvan Selleck, DFC	For service to veterans particularly through the Returned and Services League Surfers Paradise Sub-Branch	
Maxine Denise Shaw	For service to nursing in isolated communities	
Dr Margaret Sheldon	For service to the community through the provision and development of rural health services	
Athyl Dawn Smith	For service to the performing arts and to the community	
Joan Smith	For service to charitable organisations	
Eris Mary Smyth	For service to the community and to the trade union movement	
Patricia Meria Somerville	For service to tenpin bowling	
June Ethel Stephenson	For service to the Beaumaris Art Group	
Roslyn Frances Stewart	For service to the National Trust of Australia, Western Australia	
Boris Sverdloff	For service to charitable and community organisations	
Enid Taczewa-Zdanowicz	For service to ballet as principal piano accompanist of the Queensland Ballet	
Donald McGregor Tanner	For service to youth	
Gemmel Tassie	For service to medicine and to the community	
Elwyn Tegel	For service to nursing and to the Uniting Church, Menindee	
Edward Albert Terry	For service to photography	
Alan Raymond Tetley	For service to band music and to the community	
Pantju Thompson	For service to the Aboriginal community	
Patrick John Toohey	For service to the community and to veterans	
Lorna Trevella	For service to music	
Leslie Jack Twentyman	For service to youth as an outreach worker and as founder of the 20th Man Homeless and Kids in Distress Fund	
Verna Joyce Vaughan	For service to the community through the World Education Fellowship, Queensland Section	
Allan John Vial, DFC	For service to veterans through the Path Finder Force Association	
Judith Elizabeth Wadham	For service to the implementation and support of volunteer community service programs in Eltham	
Mary Catherine Walsh	For service to the community	
Francis Michael Warrick	For service to the media, to conservation and to the community	
Patrick John Washington	For service to the offshore diving industry	
William Arthur Weir	For service to the welfare and support of totally and permanently incapacitated veterans	
Rosemary Anne West	For service to disadvantaged groups in the community and to journalism	
Canon James Edward Whild	For service to the community and to St Mark's Anglican Church, Darling Point	
Gordon Sinclair White	For service to local government and to the community	
Daisy Kathleen Billie Williams	For service to the community through fundraising for charitable organisations	
Raynor Alan Williams	For service to the Lord Howe Island community	
Margaret Dawn Wills	For service to the community through the Incapacitated Servicemen and Women's Association of Australia	
Sarah Esther Wilson	For service to aged people, particularly through the Aged and Invalid Pensioners' Association of South Australia	
Jolanta Tomira Wolski	For service to the Polish community	
Nicholas Xynias, BEM	For service to the community through the Ethnic Communities Council of Queensland and the provision of support services to migrants	
Doris May Yabsley	For service to the community	
Anatole Zakroczymski	For service to the Russian community	
Reinis Zusters	For service to the visual arts as a landscape painter	

==== Military Division ====
Branch	Recipient	Citation	Notes
Navy	Chief Petty Officer Thomas Edward Clarke	For service to the Royal Australian Navy, particularly as the senior chef onboard HMAS Brisbane	
Navy	Petty Officer June Lorraine Cunningham	For service to the Royal Australian Navy, particularly in the Directorate of Training and Educational Policy	
Navy	Warrant Officer Graeme Alan Mustow	For exceptional service and performance of duty with the Royal Australian Navy and the Australian Defence Force, particularly as the Academy Sergeant Major at the Australian Defence Force Academy	
Navy	Warrant Officer George John Wall	For exceptional service and devotion to duty with the Royal Australian Navy, particularly as Head of the Career Management Cell for Communicators, Naval Police Coxswains, Work Study and Band Category Sailors	
Army	Warrant Officer Class One David Leslie Bennett	For service to the Australian Army, particularly as the Regimental Sergeant Major of 2nd/4th Battalion	
Army	Warrant Officer Class One Richard Joseph Brearley	For service to the Australian Army, particularly as Range Control Officer, Rockhampton	
Army	Warrant Officer Class Two Trevor John Chell	For service to the Australian Army Reserve, particularly as the Training Warrant Officer of 140th Signal Squadron	
Army	Warrant Officer Class One Wayne John Dixon	For service to the Australian Army, particularly in the field of logistics	
Army	Captain Daniel Desmond Fleming	For service to the Australian Army, particularly as the Quartermaster of the School of Armour	
Army	Warrant Officer Class One Lillian Lucjan	For exceptional service and devotion to duty with the Australian Army, and in particular as the Regimental Sergeant Major of 1st Military Hospital	
Army	Warrant Officer Class Two Beryl Kay McGreevy	For exceptional service and devotion to duty with the Australian Army Reserve, particularly in the field of training	
Army	Warrant Officer Class One Larry Steven Staggs	For exceptional service and devotion to duty with the Australian Army, particularly in the field of supply management	
Army	Warrant Officer Class Two Jennifer Anne Tonkin	For exceptional service and devotion to duty with the Australian Army, particularly in the field of community services	
Army	Warrant Officer Class One Raymond Earle Tutt	For exceptional service and devotion to duty with the Australian Army in the field of stores system management and as Regimental Quartermaster Sergeant to 9th Transport Regiment	
Army	Warrant Officer Class One Kevin Joseph Vann	For exceptional service and devotion to duty with the Australian Army, particularly in the field of training	
Air Force	Flight Sergeant Glenn Ernest Ford	For service to the Royal Australian Air Force, particularly as Base Information Systems Officer, RAAF Williams	
Air Force	Warrant Officer Brian Andrew Fraser	For exceptional service and devotion to duty with the Royal Australian Air Force, particularly as Warrant Officer in Charge No 34 Squadron Field Training Centre	
Air Force	Flight Sergeant Malcolm John Huggett	For exceptional service and devotion to duty with the Royal Australian Air Force, particularly in the field of air transport engineering	
Air Force	Warrant Officer Dennis Frederick Olsen	For exceptional service and devotion to duty with the Royal Australian Air Force Active Reserve, particularly at No 23 Squadron	
Air Force	Warrant Officer Kevin Patrick Riley	For exceptional service and devotion to duty with the Royal Australian Air Force, particularly as the Assistant Resident Project Engineering, United States Air Force, Sacramento Air Logistics Centre	
Air Force	Sergeant Edmond Richard Wilkens	For exceptional service and devotion to duty with the Royal Australian Air Force, particularly in the field of supply computing	
