= George Fisher mine =

Mine in Mount Isa, Queensland, Australia

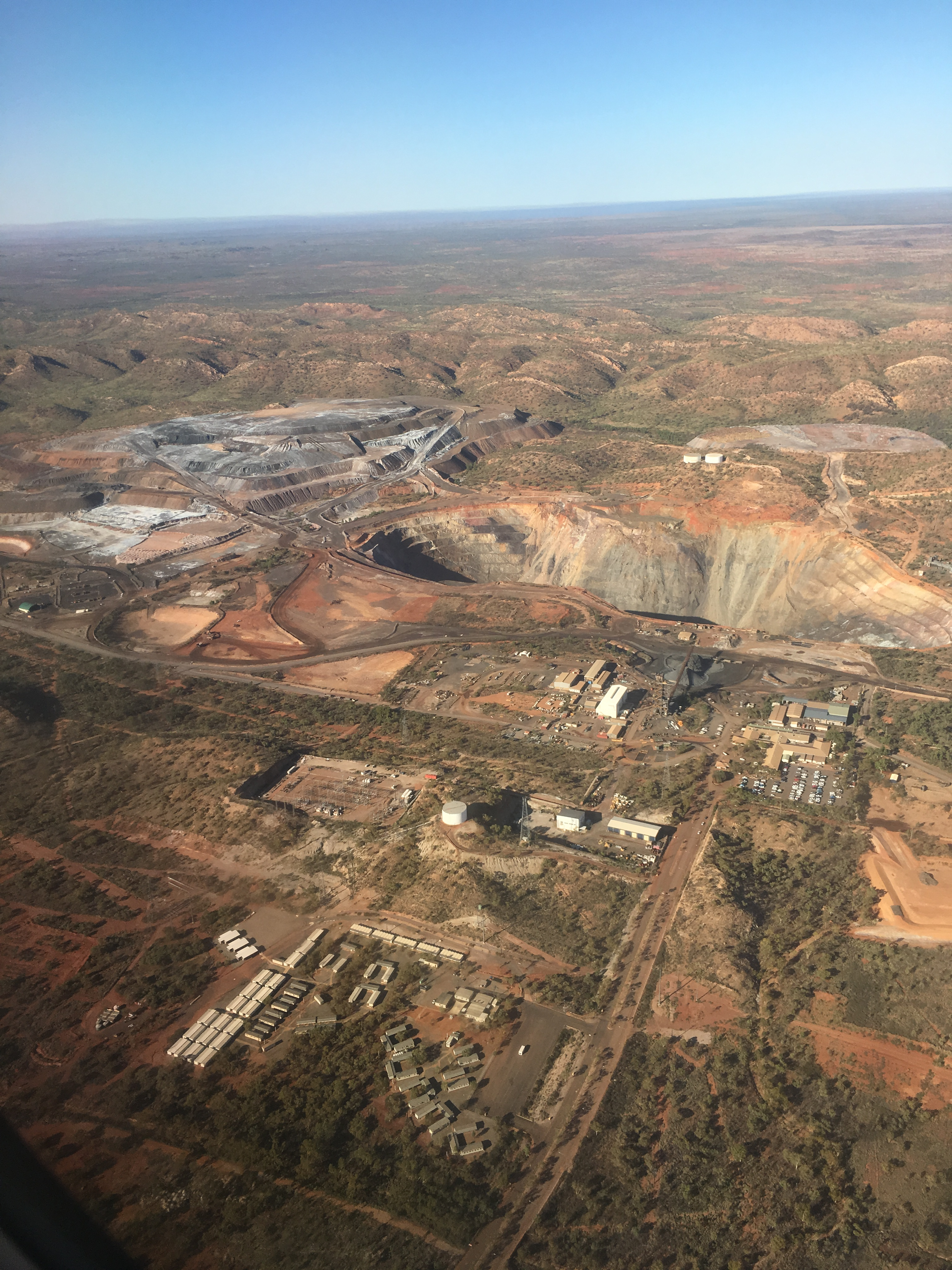
- George Fisher Mine, 2016
- Interactive map of George Fisher mine
- Location: Mount Isa, Queensland, Australia; 20°33′01″S 139°28′31″E
- Products: silver
- Company: Xstrata

The George Fisher Mine is a mine located in Mount Isa in Queensland, Australia. It is one of the largest zinc, lead and silver mines in the world. The mine is located 20 kilometres (12 mi) north of Mount Isa City in North West Queensland. The mine has estimated reserves of 150.4 million ounces of silver. It was named after George Fisher, the former chairman of Mount Isa Mines.

== History ==
Exploration of the area (then known as Hilton) for its potential began in 1948 with initially disappointing results, but with more encouraging results in 1949. From 1950, shafts were sunk to determine the size of the ore body which were promising, but heavy flows of water interfered with the exploration and the potential to mine the site. Further shafts confirmed that the site had plenty of ore but also plenty of water, which suspended further work. In the mid 1960s, metal prices were depressed and sufficient ore available at the existing mine site, resulting in further exploration of the new site being suspended. However, exploration continued on a small scale for many years with better ventilation and pumping to establish the extent of the ore body, while finding ways to manage the water.

The mine was officially opened on 15 May 1990.

Xstrata acquired the mine in 2003 when it took over MIM Holdings. At the time there were known zinc reserves of 33 million tonnes. In 2010, the ore reserve estimate was 76 million tonnes. In 2013, Glencore merged with Xstrata and the mine is now operated by Glencore.

The mine utilises a ground-mounted friction hoist which lifts ore from a depth of over 1.1 kilometres (0.68 mi).

== See also ==
- List of mines in Australia
