= Pecos River High Bridge =

Railway bridge in Texas, US

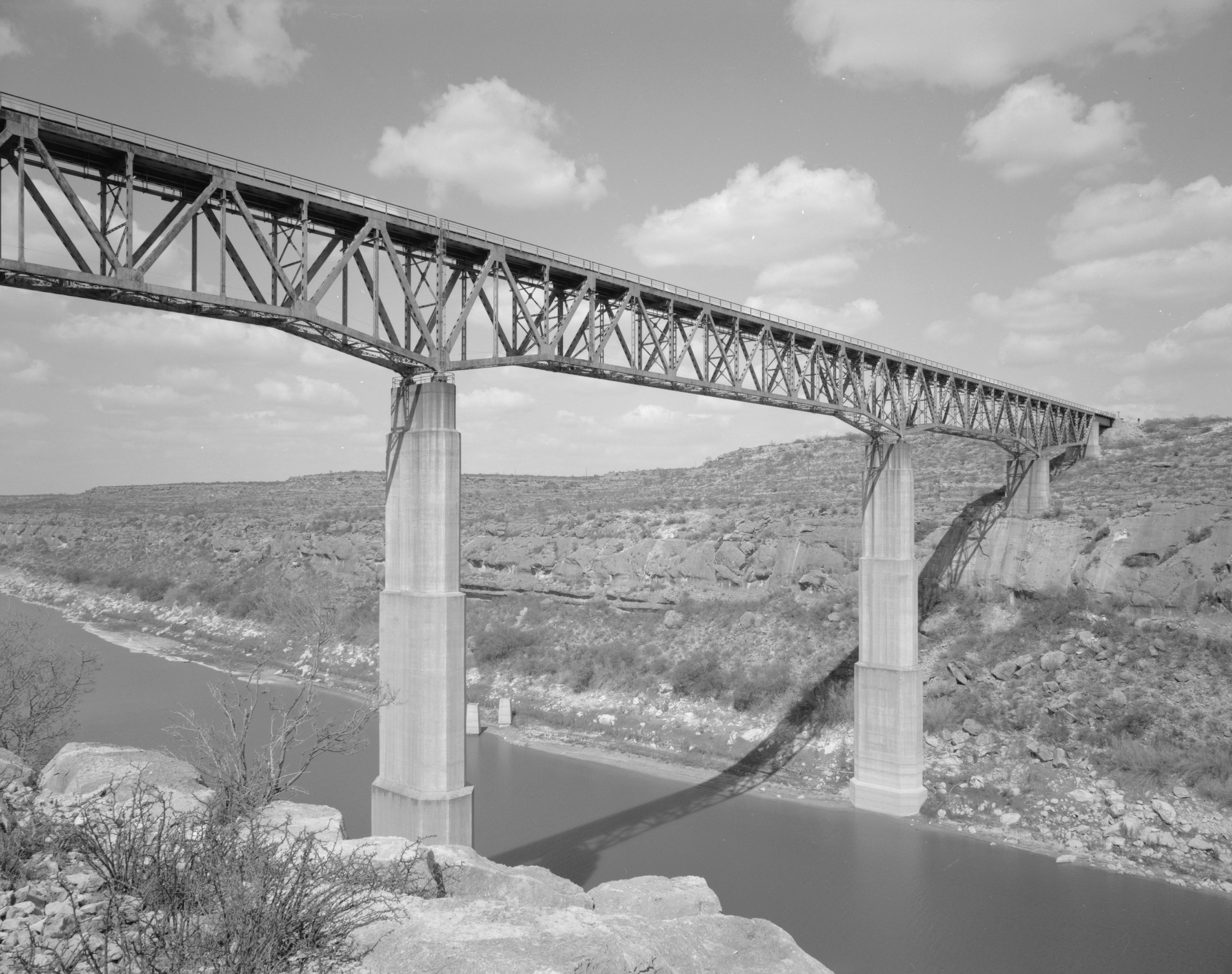
- Pecos River High Bridge, late 1990s
- Coordinates: 29°45′31″N 101°21′27″W
- Carries: Union Pacific Railroad Sanderson Subdivision
- Crosses: Pecos River
- Locale: Langtry, Texas

Characteristics
- Design: Deck truss
- Material: Steel
- Longest span: 374.5 feet (114.1 m)
- No. of spans: 7
- Piers in water: 2

History
- Designer: Modjeski and Masters
- Constructed by: Brown and Root, substructure; Bethlehem Steel Company, superstructure
- Construction start: 1943
- Construction end: 1944

Location
- Interactive map of Pecos River High Bridge

The Pecos River High Bridge carries the Union Pacific Railroad across the Pecos River gorge, near the town of Comstock, Texas, and is historically the second high-level crossing on this site.

== History ==
The first Pecos River Bridge, designed by SP chief engineer Julius Kruttschnitt, was built by the Phoenix Bridge Company and completed in 1892. The Prosperity Special crossed in 1922. After strengthening and reinforcement in 1910 and again in 1929 which almost doubled its weight, it remained in place until 1949, five years after its replacement. The second (current) Pecos River High Bridge, was completed by the Southern Pacific Railroad on December 8, 1944.

The current Pecos River High Bridge is a steel deck truss bridge on slip-formed concrete piers, ranging in height up to 275 feet (84 m). It was designed by Modjeski and Masters of Harrisburg, Pennsylvania, with foundations constructed by Brown and Root of Houston and trusses fabricated by Bethlehem Steel Company of Chicago. Because of material rationing during World War II, War Production Board approval was required before proceeding fabrication.

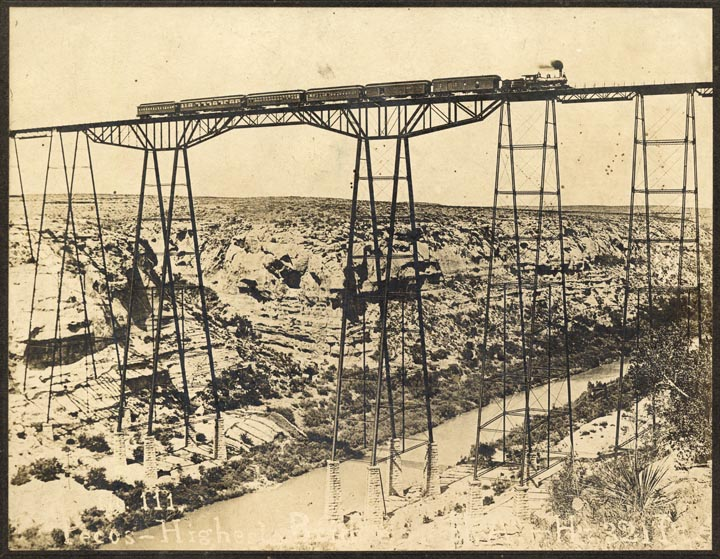
Pecos Viaduct, 1892

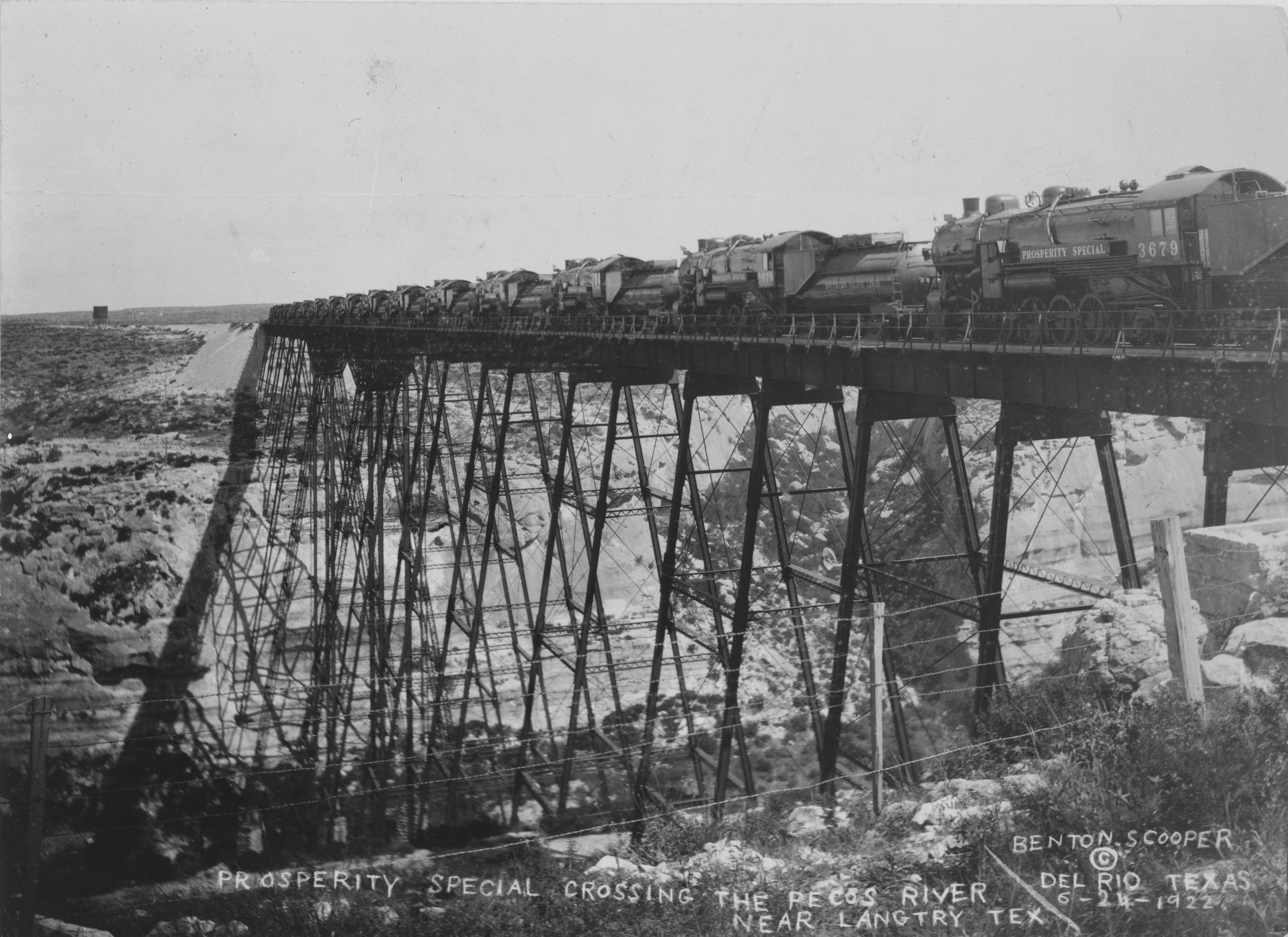
1922 photo entitled Prosperity Special crossing the Pecos river, near Langtry, Texas; the photo shows reinforcement of the original viaduct

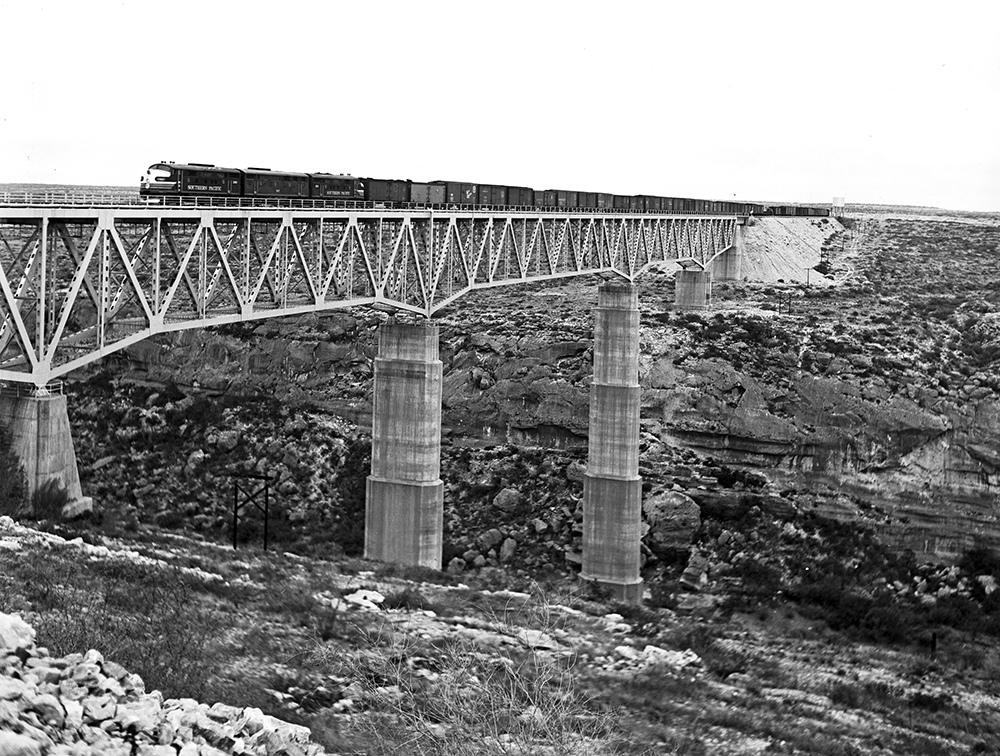
Southern Pacific Railroad train on bridge, 1951

== Route ==
In addition to freight trains of the Union Pacific (which merged with the Southern Pacific in 1996), this bridge carries Amtrak's Sunset Limited and Texas Eagle between its stations in Sanderson and Del Rio.

== See also ==
- List of bridges documented by the Historic American Engineering Record in Texas
- List of bridges in the United States by height
- Texas and New Orleans Railroad
