= Railroads' War Board =

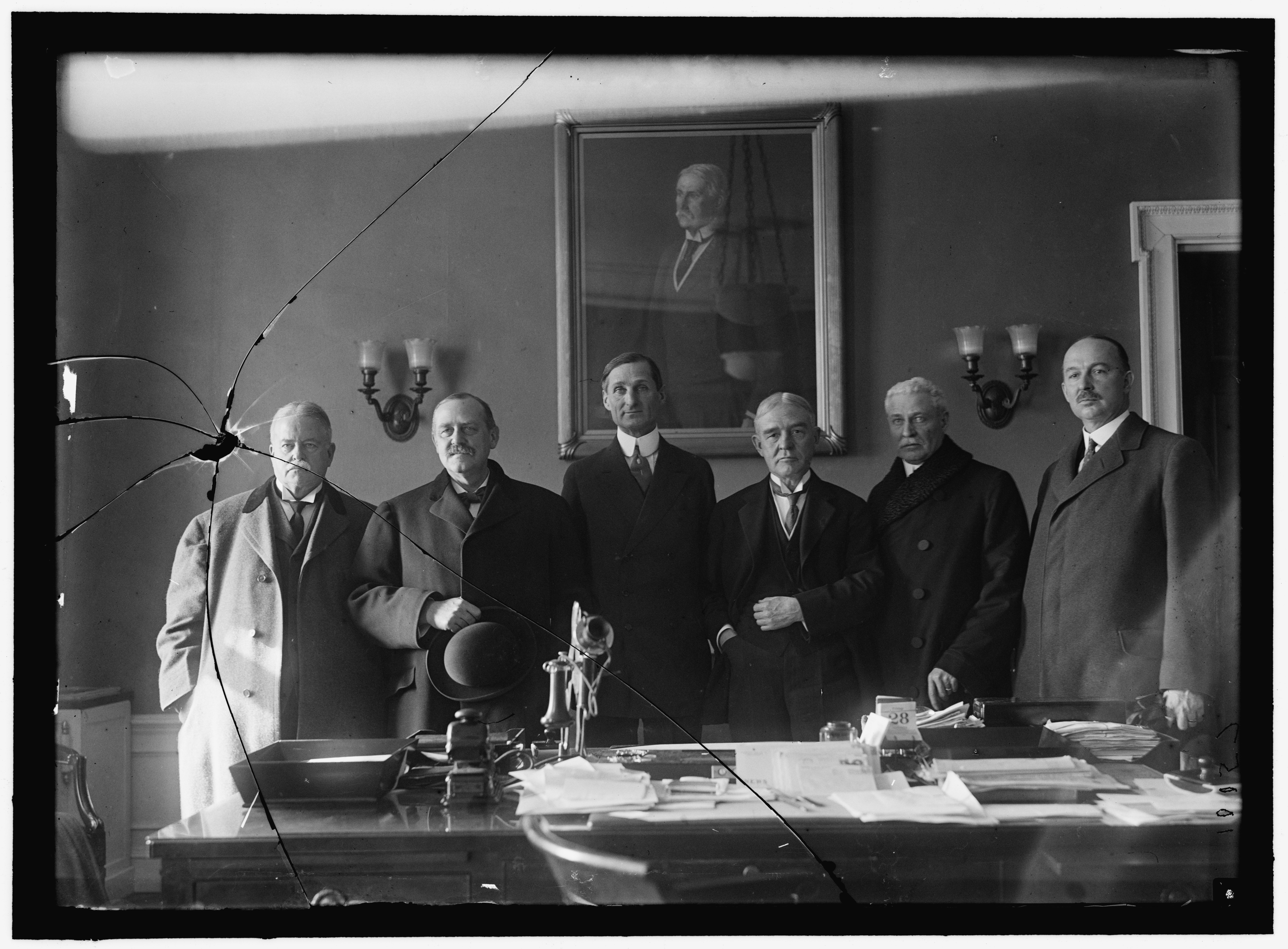
Members of the Railroads' War Board with William Gibbs McAdoo, Director General of the USRA, in 1918

The Railroads' War Board was a committee of U.S. railroad executives that operated voluntarily during 1917 to coordinate rail service as the United States entered World War I.

Following the declaration of war by the United States on April 6, 1917, a large meeting of railroad executives was convened in Washington, D.C. to discuss supporting the war effort. The American Railway Association authorized creation of the war board. The board comprised five members, chaired by Fairfax Harrison, president of the Southern Railway. The additional members were:

- Howard Elliott, chairman, Northern Pacific Railway
- Hale Holden, president, Chicago, Burlington & Quincy Railroad
- Julius Kruttschnitt, chairman, Southern Pacific Railroad
- Samuel Rea, president, Pennsylvania Railroad.

There were also two ex officio members who participated in board discussions and policies: Daniel Willard, President, Baltimore and Ohio Railroad (liaison with the recently formed Council of National Defense); and Edgar E. Clark, Commissioner, Interstate Commerce Commission (which was itself closely studying the national railroad problems).

The board had limited success and, in late 1917, supported President Wilson’s decision to nationalize the railroads to support the war effort. On December 26, 1917, Wilson created the United States Railroad Administration (USRA) to carry out that nationalization, after which the board dissolved.
