= Casa Grande, Mount Isa =

Casa Grande
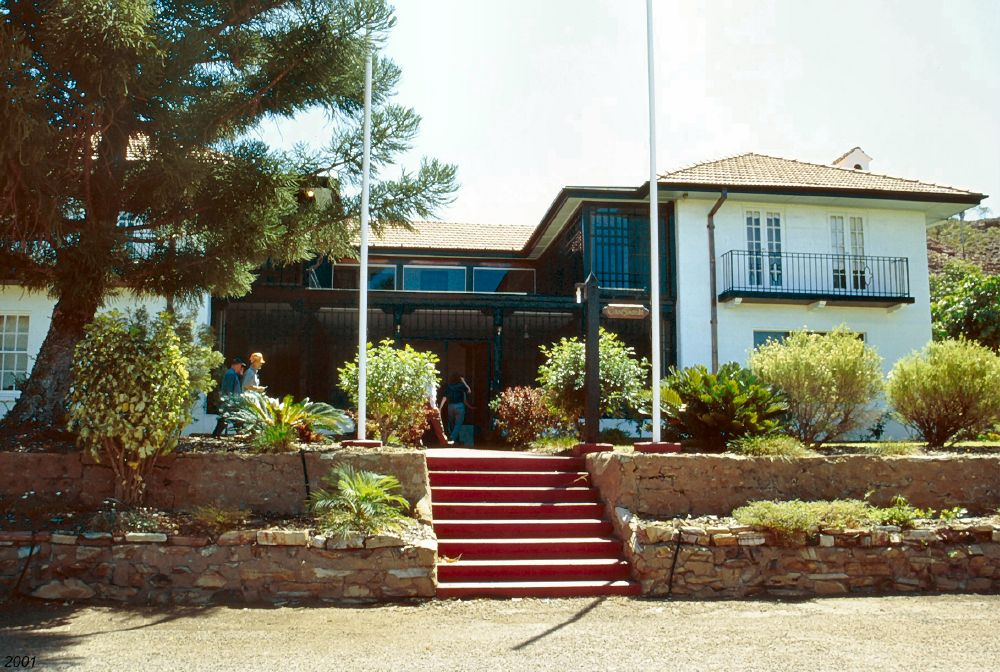
- Casa Grande, 2001

- Location within Queensland Location within Australia
- 20.7413°S 139.4754°E
- Location: Nettle Street, Mount Isa, City of Mount Isa, Queensland, Australia

History
- Design period: 1940s–1960s (post-World War II)
- Built: 1949

Site notes
- Architect: Donoghue, Cusick & Edwards
- Architectural style: Spanish Mission

Queensland Heritage Register
- Official name: Casa Grande
- Type: state heritage (landscape, built)
- Designated: 28 May 1999
- Reference no.: 601094
- Significant period: 1949–1966, 1970 (fabric, historical); 1949 (social)
- Significant components: tennis court, residential accommodation – main house, fence/wall – perimeter, views from, gate – entrance, views to, bridge – foot/pedestrian, driveway, garden/grounds, courtyard, furniture/fittings

Casa Grande is a heritage-listed villa at Nettle Street, Mount Isa, City of Mount Isa, Queensland, Australia. It was designed by Donoghue, Cusick & Edwards and built in 1949. It was added to the Queensland Heritage Register on 28 May 1999.

== History ==
Work commenced on Casa Grande as a home for the then General Manager of Mount Isa Mines, Julius Kruttschnitt II, in 1949. It was a "grand house", designed by the prominent Brisbane firm of Donoghue, Cusick and Edwards, but reflecting the influence of Kruschnitt's time spent in both Arizona and Mexico.

Kruttschnitt, with a background of developing mines in America for ASARCO's mining department, had taken on the challenge in 1930, of revitalising the ailing Mount Isa Mine at a time when the company was unable to meet outstanding financial commitments. The 1930s, a time of depression and austerity throughout Australia, was reflected in the price of lead plunging to the lowest point in the history of the metal markets.

Kruttschnitt tackled Mount Isa's problems with relentless energy and after more capital was raised through overseas financiers, ore production commenced again in 1931. In earlier years of the mine's operation, the company expended large amounts of money providing housing for employees. Two-storeyed timber houses, a number of dormitories and community buildings were constructed for workers during these more buoyant years. The 1930s saw more austere housing accommodation for workers often in the form of tin huts and tent houses. The problem of a lack of financial resources for accommodation extended to Kruttschnitt's own residence. Initially, he was housed in a modest staff house overlooking Central Park and the Band Rotunda. Kruttschnitt was reported to be unimpressed with his quarters.

The finances of the company did not improve until after World War II. While copper had been discovered in 1930, the Japanese attack on Pearl Harbor, and the consumption of copper in Australian factories and munition works, meant that Mount Isa Mines went into full-scale copper production during that period. By 1946, with the end of the war, and a soaring consumption of lead in the United States for assembly lines and defence stockpiles, the price of lead rose to the unprecedented height of £91 a ton. In 1947, for the first time, the mine was able to pay a dividend to its investors. With the mine in an increasingly healthy financial position and an influx of workers to accommodate, the company renewed its housing program. Houses of simple design were constructed, as were dormitories. The company included in its program improved recreational facilities, including tennis courts and a swimming pool.

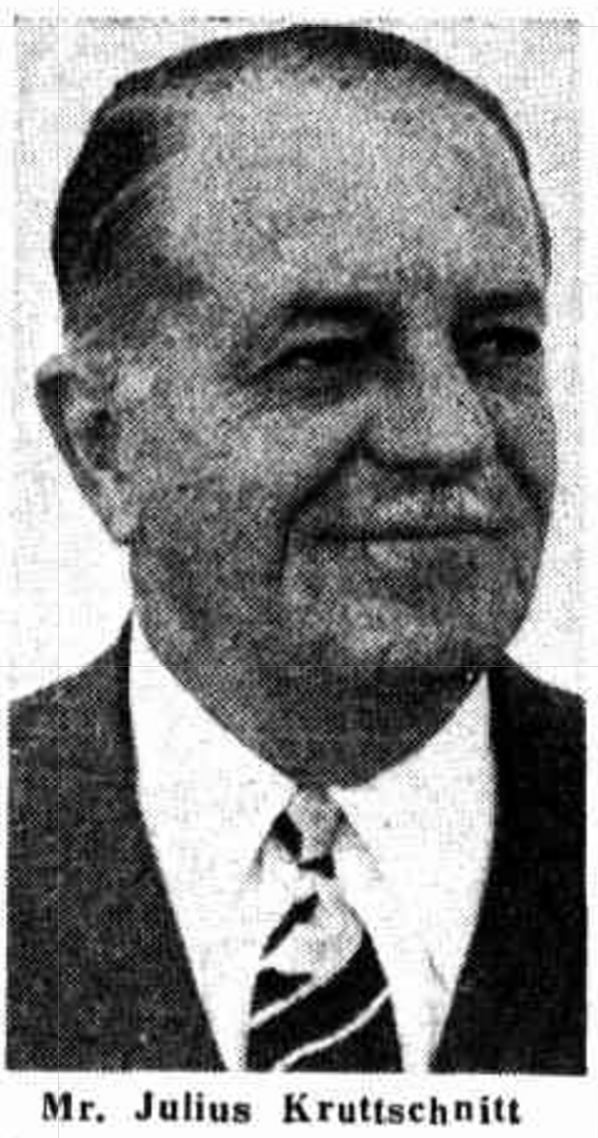
Julius Kruttschnitt, Chairman of Mount Isa Mines, 1946

By the late 1940s attention was also paid to providing improved housing for mine executives. The building of a house for Julius Kruttschnitt, now Chairman of Directors, was commenced in 1949 on part of Special Mineral Lease 5589, overlooking older company housing dating from 1928–29. The name given to the house, literally "big house", reflected the prosperity of Mount Isa Mines at that time and is a term commonly used in Arizona and New Mexico to describe the "boss's"house. Casa Grande was designed by the prominent Brisbane architectural firm of Donoghue, Cusick and Edwards, probably incorporating the ideas of their client, Julius Kruttschnitt.

On the 22 July 1950, a housewarming party was given at "Casa Grande" by Mr & Mrs Kruttschnitt, who entertained their guests under a marquee on the lawns. Small groups of people were shown over the house; certainly the largest and most elaborate house to be built in the hot, dry western district of Queensland.

Casa Grande has been used for many social events. In 1951 when badges were presented to employees of MIM who had served twenty years with the Company, a dinner was arranged for the 80 men and their wives by Mrs Kruttschnitt. An annual New Year's Eve punchbowl party was just one of the functions hosted by the Kruttschnitts during their time at Casa Grande.

Julius Kruttschnitt resigned as Chairman of Directors in 1952 but did not return to the United States, settling in Brisbane at his home Casa Ita. He was succeeded at Mount Isa by George Fisher who lived with his family at Casa Grande until 1966. During the time of the Fisher's occupancy, the house was refurnished and much of this furniture remains at Casa Grande.

Casa Grande became a guest house for visiting directors of the company and VIPs from 1966. A suite at the house was redecorated and refurnished for Queen Elizabeth, who visited the town in 1970. A dining room table, with the tabletop constructed from one piece of cedar was bought by the Company for the Queen's visit.

Casa Grande reflects the period in the life of Mount Isa Mines when the first dividend was paid, and the Company, after years of struggle, was becoming profitable. By 1955 MIM Ltd was the largest mining company in Australia and a company with a strong international reputation.

== Description ==
Casa Grande is Spanish Mission in style, built of 6" thick Denaro bricks with stuccoed outer walls. The white walls contrast with the dark timber framed sash windows and doors, and the building has terracotta roof tiles and balconies.

The large, U-shaped, two storeyed house, encloses a courtyard which is overlooked by surrounding verandahs supported by roughly hewn timber posts. Casa Grande is built on a rise and is a landmark overlooking the mine and the remaining houses of the Isa Mine (Mineside) settlement. It is located within well-kept grounds with a tennis court. The encircling drive and luxuriant gardens, a striking feature in such an arid area, add considerable distinction and presence to the house, emphasising the social standing of the Chairman of Directors within the community.

The area considered significant therefore includes the grounds and is bounded by the property fence on the western and eastern sides, by the footbridge on the southern side and by the entrance beyond the "island" bed on the northern side.

The condition of the house is excellent, and the integrity good. Additions have occurred, but most have been sympathetic to the original design. The furniture complements the house and has a significance of its own.

== Heritage listing ==
Casa Grande was listed on the Queensland Heritage Register on 28 May 1999 having satisfied the following criteria.

The place is important in demonstrating the evolution or pattern of Queensland's history.

Casa Grande, built on the original Mineside settlement, demonstrates the development of the Mount Isa as a mining industry town.

The place is important in demonstrating the principal characteristics of a particular class of cultural places.

Casa Grande is a late, but good, example of Spanish Mission style.

The place is important because of its aesthetic significance.

The house is a landmark in Mount Isa as a prominent and grand house reflecting the relative importance of the position of mine manager in Mount Isa.

The place has a strong or special association with a particular community or cultural group for social, cultural or spiritual reasons.

The house has social value to the Mount Isa community as a prominent local residence and as a community gathering place.

The place has a special association with the life or work of a particular person, group or organisation of importance in Queensland's history.

Casa Grande has a close association with MIM Directors, Julius Kruttschnitt and George Fisher, both of whom are men of international reputation. This is particularly the case with Kruttschnitt, whose Mexican/Arizona experience may have influenced the style of construction.
