= The Prosperity Special =

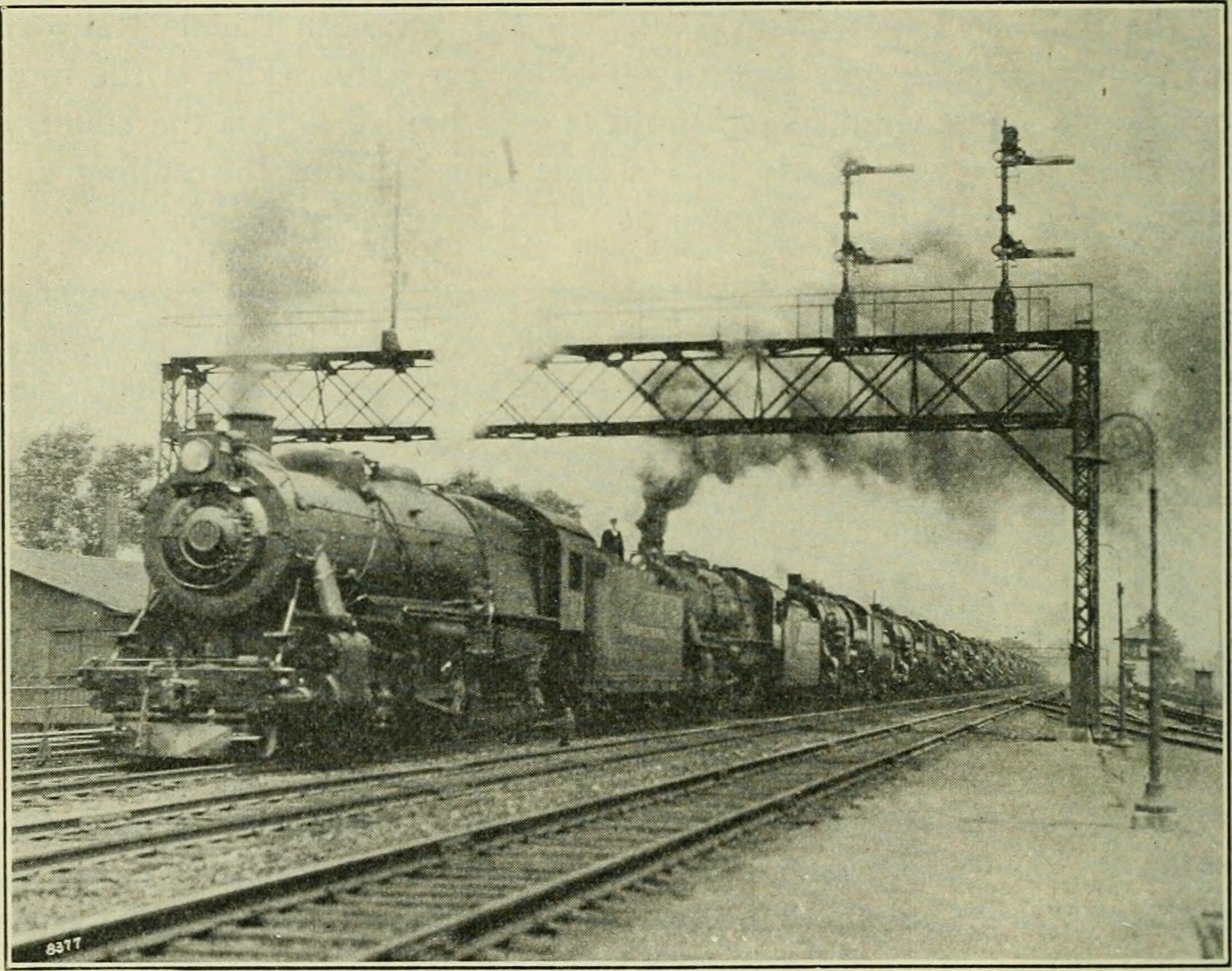
The Prosperity Special

The Prosperity Special was a notable shipment of twenty 2-10-2 Baldwin steam locomotives in May and June 1922.

== History ==
The shipment of twenty locomotives made by the Baldwin Locomotive Works for the Southern Pacific Railroad, was part of an order for fifty. This was the most remarkable single train of locomotives ever hauled across the country until then. The train itself was nearly half a mile long without the pulling and pushing engines. It departed on 22 May 1922 from Eddystone, bound for St. Louis on the Pennsylvania Railroad. It went then via the St. Louis Southwestern Railway to Corsicana. The train moved then via Southern Pacific to Los Angeles, where it arrived in June 1922.

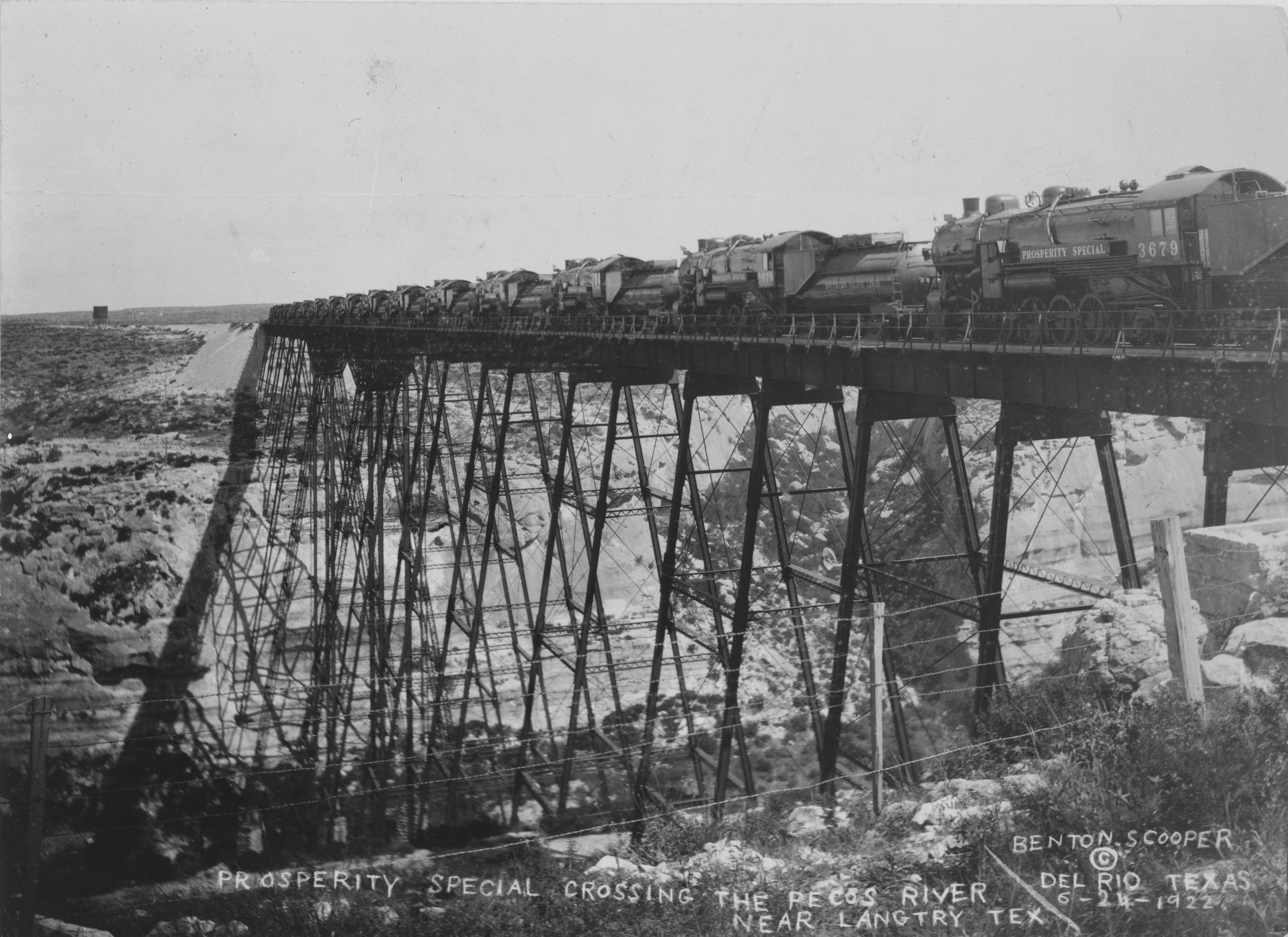
The Prosperity Special crossing the Pecos River High Bridge

These locomotives were subsequently used in heavy freight service on heavy grades in the Far West. They are carried on five pairs of driving wheels, with a two-wheeled truck at the front and rear. The large amount of weight on the driving wheels gives a great hauling capacity, while the trucks support the ends of the locomotive and guide it into curves and switches. Each locomotive was nearly 100 feet (30 m) in length, weighing 621,000 pounds (282 t). so that the entire train of twenty weighed in excess of 6,000 tons. The tenders had cylindrical water tanks and a smaller tank at the front end to carry the oil fuel which all Southern Pacific locomotives burn. The oil was sprayed into the furnace by a jet of steam and the fire is controlled by means of valves placed within easy reach of the fireman.

Various modern devices were applied to increase the efficiency and capacity of the locomotives. Before entering the boiler, the feed water was heated; and the steam was also highly superheated before it entered the steam cylinders. An auxiliary engine known as a booster was attached to the rear truck for increasing the hauling power when starting heavy trains and climbing steep grades. The locomotive was reversed by a power operated device which relieved the engineer of considerable manual labor.

It was only possible to haul twenty of these heavy locomotives in a single train, and it required several pulling and pushing locomotives on level stretches, while in passing over the Allegheny Mountains west of Altoona, additional helping power was needed. No less than six engines were necessary to move the train around the Horseshoe Curve. Throughout the entire journey, each locomotive was manned by an experienced engineer, who was personally in charge of the locomotive to which he was assigned.

The departure of this complete train of locomotives, the most valuable ever moved in the United States as a single unit until then, was a most memorable event at the works where they were built. Many people from Washington, Pennsylvania, all parts of Pennsylvania and adjoining States, including officials from the Southern Pacific and other railways of the country witnessed the starting. By reason of the care which had to be exercised in the handling of this train, its movements were in the daytime only. No attempt at speed was made at any point, and this also permitted the train to be reviewed by millions of people throughout its long journey. At many of the stopping places and in a large number of cities through which it passed, State and Municipal authorities, officers and members of Chambers of Commerce, Boards of Trade, commercial and industrial organizations, public school authorities and local trade and business associations made arrangements to review the train as it passed through their localities. At the night stopping places, opportunity was afforded for a close inspection of the locomotives.
