= George Fisher (mining engineer) =

Australian mining executive (1903–2007)

Sir George Fisher CMG HonFAusIMM
- Born: George Reid Fisher; 1903; Gladstone, South Australia
- Died: 2007 (aged 103–104); Macleod, Victoria, Australia
- Education: Gladstone High School; Prince Alfred College; University of Adelaide
- Occupations: Business executive; company director
- Awards: Companion of the Order of St Michael and St George; Honorary Fellow of the Australasian Institute of Mining and Metallurgy; Complete list

Sir George Read Fisher (1903 – 13 July 2007) was one of Australia's leading mining executives. In 2019, he was posthumously inducted into the Queensland Business Leaders Hall of Fame in recognition of his eminent business leadership, driving the long-term success of Mount Isa Mines and Mount Isa's growth and development as a city.

== Early life ==
Fisher was born in Gladstone, South Australia into a farming family. He attended Gladstone High School and then Prince Alfred College in Adelaide. In 1925, he graduated from the University of Adelaide with a Bachelor of Engineering (mining).

== Mining career ==
Fisher began his career in Broken Hill as an underground manager and later became the general manager at the Zinc Corporation. In these roles, he worked with the Barrier Industrial Council and the union leaders.

The Allied Works Council seconded him in World War II to create tunnels in the cliffs of Darwin Harbour to store fuel supplies so they would be safe during bombing raids by Japan.

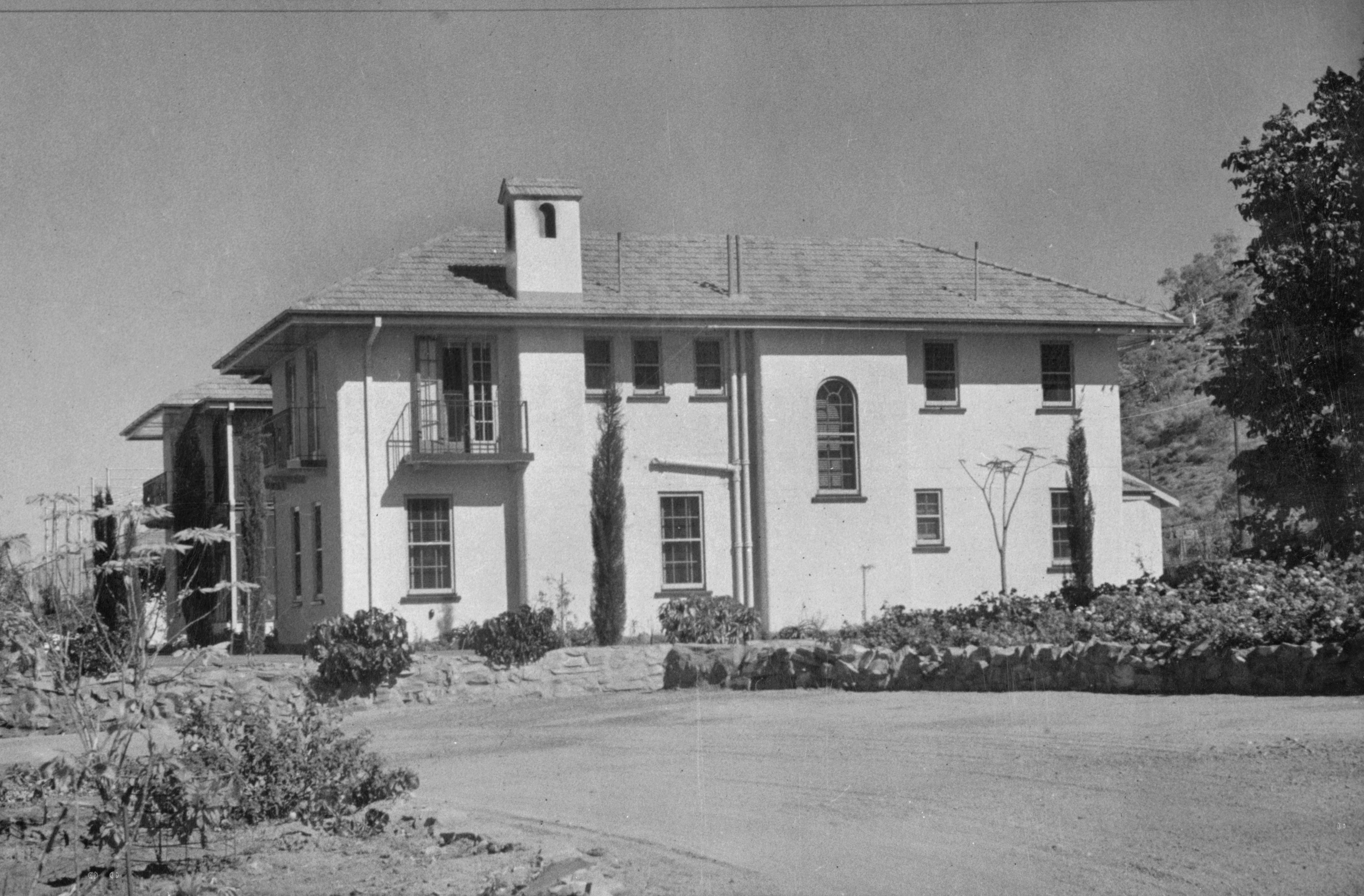
Casa Grande, George Fisher's home in Mount Isa, 1954

With the impending retirement of Mount Isa Mines (MIM) chairman, Julius Kruttschnitt, Fisher joined MIM, then controlled by US company ASARCO, in 1952 as general manager, becoming chairman in 1953. Attracting him to Mount Isa was the prospect of freedom from overseas interference and autonomy to run the company as he saw fit. This was to be a major turning point for MIM and the town of Mount Isa which, in both cases, were to be transformed under his leadership.

He set about building houses and facilities to attract a stable workforce and embarked on a large-scale exploration program resulting in extremely rich new mineral deposits. By 1959 a copper refinery was built in Townsville facilitating the local refinement of copper and the manufacture of copper products. He was always a strong advocate of local downstream value-adding.

During the 1950s, Fisher was also responsible for construction of Lake Moondarra, the largest private water storage project in Australia. He successfully negotiating with the Queensland Government and the Australian Government to have the Mt Isa to Townsville railway reconstructed was another major success during this era.

Under Fisher's leadership, mine production went from 1,500 to 16,000 tons per day. Copper production went from zero to 100,000 tons per year, ready to go to 150,000 before he retired. Lead production was over 100,000 tons. It was probably the largest lead and silver mine in Australia, and one of the largest in the world at the time. The copper was at number nine worldwide and reserves went from three million tons to 140 million tons. Under his leadership, the town developed from 6,000 people to over 20,000 people and the payroll went from seven million pounds, to 31 million pounds.

Sir George rendered extensive community service. He was a recognised in the mining industry, as well as for his innovations, and among the most cited as a pioneer of regional development in Australia's history.

== Later life ==
Sir George Fisher retired in 1970, but remained active through his involvement in the Queensland Art Gallery Foundation and the Queensland Country Party.

When James Cook University of North Queensland (now James Cook University) was established in 1970, Sir George Fisher became the university's Foundation Chancellor. He held that position until 1974. The university named a significant building on its Douglas campus in Townsville after Fisher.

Fisher died on 13 July 2007 aged 104.

== Awards ==
Fisher was awarded the Companion of the Order of St Michael and St George (Imperial) on 10 June 1961. He was knighted on 10 June 1967. In 1974, he was also awarded an honorary fellowship of the Australasian Institute of Mining and Metallurgy (HonFAusIMM).

== Legacy ==
The George Fisher mine is named after him.

The suburb of Fisher in Mount Isa is named after him.
