= Julius Kruttschnitt =

American railroad executive (1854–1925)

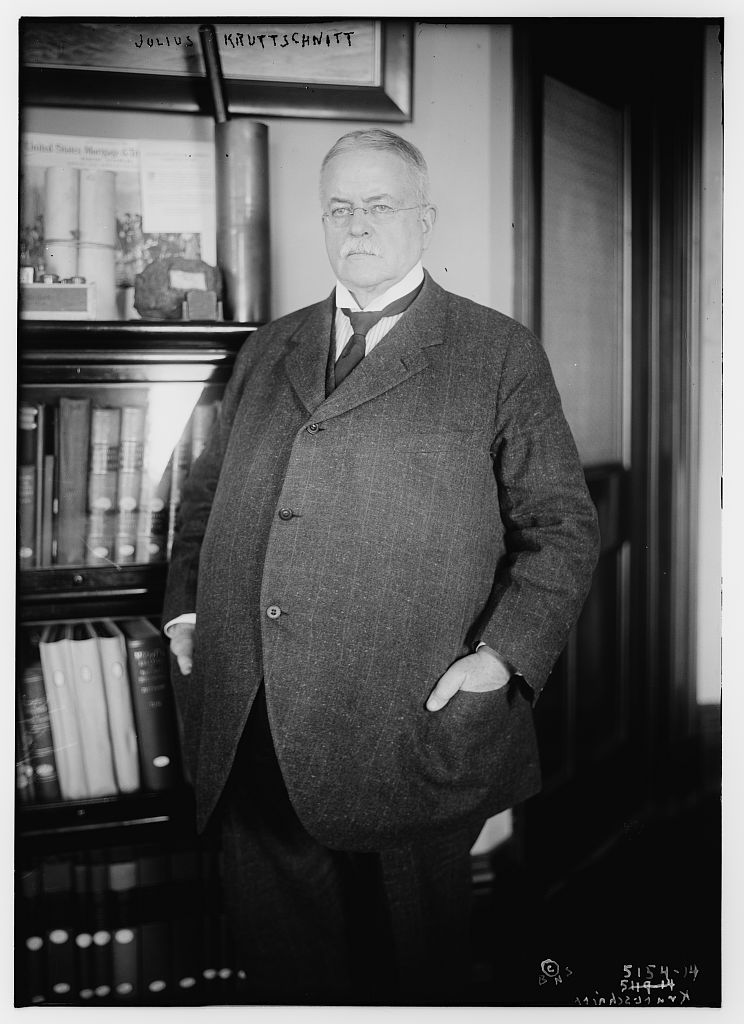
- Kruttschnitt in 1920
- Born: July 30, 1854; New Orleans, Louisiana, U.S.
- Died: June 15, 1925 (aged 70); New York City, New York, U.S.
- Resting place: Metairie Cemetery
- Education: Washington and Lee University (BS)
- Occupation: Railroad executive
- Employer: Southern Pacific Railroad
- Board member of: Southern Pacific Railroad, Union Pacific Railroad, Western Union, Erie Railroad, Wells Fargo
- Spouse: Elise Minna Krock (m. 1882)
- Children: 4, including Julius Jr.
- Relatives: Judah P. Benjamin (uncle)

Julius Kruttschnitt (July 30, 1854 – June 15, 1925) was an American railroad executive of German descent. He joined the Southern Pacific Railroad in 1885 and was its vice president from 1898 to 1913 and then served as chairman of the executive committee until his retirement in May 1925. He also served as vice president of the Galveston, Harrisburg, and San Antonio Railway and the Texas and New Orleans Railroad and as president of the New York, Texas and Mexican Railway. He was one of five railroad executives on the Railroads' War Board during World War I.

== Early life ==
Julius Kruttschnitt was born on July 30, 1854, at the family home on Prytania and Philip streets in New Orleans, Louisiana, to Penina (née Benjamin) and John K. Kruttschnitt. His mother's family were from South Carolina and his father was of German descent. His father was the German consul in New Orleans. His uncle was U.S. senator and Confederate leader Judah P. Benjamin. Kruttschnitt attended city schools in New Orleans. He graduated as a civil engineer with a Bachelor of Science from Washington and Lee University in 1873.

== Career ==
From 1873 to 1878, Kruttschnitt worked as an assistant principal under William Allan at McDonogh School in Maryland. On July 1, 1878, he became resident engineer in charge of the construction of Morgan's Louisiana and Texas Railroad at Berwick, Louisiana. On January 1 1880, following the completion of the railroad, he became the roadmaster of its western division. On April 1, 1881, he became assistant chief engineer and general roadmaster and on April 1, 1883, he was promoted to chief engineer and superintendent.

On October 1, 1885, Kruttschnitt joined the Southern Pacific Railroad as assistant general manager of its Atlantic system, including lines east of El Paso, Texas. On July 1, 1889, he became general manager of those lines and later general manager of the entire system. In 1898, he became the fourth vice president of the railroad. He served under the railroad's president E. H. Harriman. From 1901 to 1904, he was assistant to the railroad's president. He also served as vice president of the Galveston, Harrisburg, and San Antonio Railway and the Texas and New Orleans Railroad. He was president of the New York, Texas and Mexican Railway, the Gulf, Western Texas and Pacific Railway, and the Sabine and East Texas Railway.

From 1904 to 1911, Kruttschnitt served as the director of maintenance and operations of the Union Pacific Railroad and the Southern Pacific alongside his role as vice president of the Southern Pacific. The companies were merged and then headquartered in Chicago. He was called the "von Moltke of Transportation" in contrast to E. H. Harriman's leadership as the "Napoleon of Railroading" on the Union Pacific and Southern Pacific lines. Following Harriman's desire for uniform classes of locomotives for the Southern Pacific and Union Pacific lines, Kruttschnitt argued that choice was impractical due to different operating conditions between the lines. Upon the death of Harriman in 1909, he took over as president of an operating board of Harriman's lines. In 1913, the companies were separated by the government and Kruttschnitt stayed with the Southern Pacific and moved his offices to New York City. He then became the chairman of the executive committee and director of the company. In 1921, the Union Pacific tried to gain control of the Central Pacific Railroad, which Kruttschnitt considered offensive and argued that the Union Pacific executed a "campaign of vilification and misrepresentation" to support its agenda to acquire the Central Pacific over Kruttschnitt's Southern Pacific. In the 1920s, he led the building of station buildings in southeastern Oregon to support the Southern Pacific's bid. He retired as chairman on May 31, 1925, following the company's retirement rule of 70 years of age. He continued as director of the company until his death. Following his retirement as chairman, a portion of his role was absorbed by then Southern Pacific president William Sproule and Henry deForest succeeded his as chairman of the executive committee. Under Kruttschnitt's leadership, the Southern Pacific's grew from 10,000 miles and an annual gross earnings of US$143,000,000 to about 15,550 miles and an annual gross earnings of US$300,000,000.

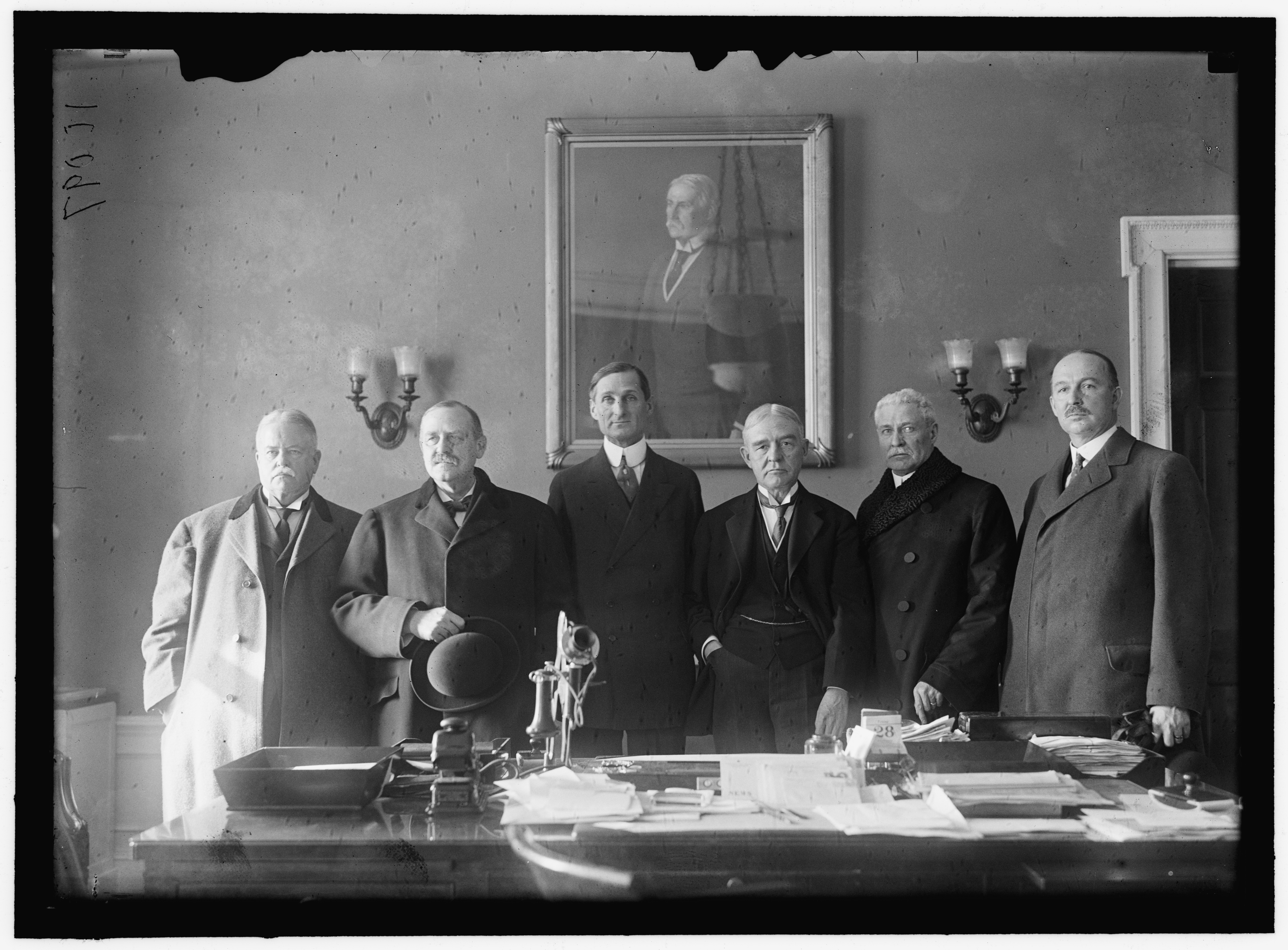
Railroads' War Board in 1918, with Kruttschnitt on the far left and Director General William Gibbs McAdoo at center-left

During World War I, Kruttschnitt was one of the Railroads' War Board, called the Central Committee of Five, a committee to supervise railroads for the country's benefit during the war. He fought President Woodrow Wilson's policy to compensate the railroads when the government took over control. After the war, he asked Congress to implement a fixed railroad policy that would not change with each administration. He questioned the government's management of the railroads. At a Senate committee, he argued that under Director General of Railroads William Gibbs McAdoo's management, equipment and discipline in the railroads had broken down. He argued for relief of this situation by suggesting five remedies:

- Stop common carrier usage of highways without adequate tolls and proper regulations.
- Build or improve inland waterways for common carrier traffic using adequate tolls.
- Stop the government's operation of steamships and public money expenditures relating to coast-to-coast ocean transportation that compete with transcontinental railroads.
- Panama Canal tolls should be sufficient to pay the interest on its costs, operating expenses, and maintenance.
- Do not implement a long and short haul clause that will limit transcontinental carriers from coast-to-coast traffic.

In 1923, Kruttschnitt stated that the cost of coal needed to rise and suggested methods to conserve coal: substituting hydroelectric current for steam, substituting steam turbines for the ordinary locomotive engine, finding cheap fuel for locomotives, and adapting the Diesel engine to locomotives. In 1923, he argued the Transportation Act of 1920 improved the financial state of the railroads and again urged the government to keep its hands off the railroads. He also believed the Interstate Commerce Commission's mismanagement nullified the purposes of the act. In a 1925 speech at the New York section of the American Society of Civil Engineers, he described managers should have a fundamental understanding of science, an ability "to think logically and quantitatively", "to write and speak clearly and correctly", an understanding of economic theories, "an unlimited capacity to learn", "the habit of looking forward", and a "pronounced firmness combined with a high sense of fairness and charity".

Kruttschnitt was a member of the executive committee and director of the Western Union, the Erie Railroad, and the United States Mortgage and Trust Company. He was a director of Wells Fargo. He was a member of the executive committee of the Association of Railway Executives and the American Railway Association. His office was on Broadway in Manhattan.

== Personal life ==
Kruttschnitt married Elise Minna Krock of New Orleans in 1882. They had three sons and a daughter, Theodore H., Julius Jr., John, and Mrs. Clifford H. Woodhouse. He lived in New Canaan, Connecticut, and had a home on Lexington Avenue in New York City. He was a member of the Metropolitan Club of New York City and the Metropolitan Club of Washington, D.C., the Lawyers' Club, the India House of New York City, the Country Club of New Canaan, Connecticut, and the Woodway Country Club of Connecticut. His hobbies included reading, chemistry, astronomy, gardening, and golf.

Kruttschnitt had a surgical operation in May or June 1925. He died weeks later of a heart attack on June 15, 1925, at NewYork-Presbyterian Hospital in New York City. He was buried at Metairie Cemetery in New Orleans.

== See also ==
- List of Wells Fargo directors
- Pecos River High Bridge
