= Tim Bowden =

Australian historian (1937–2024)

Tim Bowden AM
- Born: Timothy Gibson Bowden; 2 August 1937; Hobart, Tasmania, Australia
- Died: 1 September 2024 (aged 87); Sydney, Australia
- Education: University of Tasmania
- Occupations: Author, radio and television broadcaster and producer, oral historian
- Writing career
- Period: 1970s–1990s
- Genre: History
- Notable awards: Member of the Order of Australia; Centenary Medal; Honorary Doctorate of Letters, University of Tasmania

Timothy Gibson Bowden AM (2 August 1937 – 1 September 2024) was an Australian author, radio and television broadcaster and producer, and oral historian. He was born in Hobart, Tasmania, and studied at the University of Tasmania, where he graduated with a Bachelor of Arts degree.

Bowden's work included hosting the Australian Broadcasting Corporation program Backchat (1986–1994), producing This Day Tonight during the 1970s, and founding the ABC's Social History Unit. His other productions include Prisoners of War – Australians Under Nippon and the 24-part series Taim Bilong Masta – The Australian Involvement with Papua New Guinea.

Tim Bowden has also authored numerous books and oral histories, including the well-known The Changi Camera documenting Australian prisoners-of-war under Japanese captivity.

Tim Bowden was a war correspondent during the Vietnam War, which included embedded journalism with military units on patrol. He was the only Western journalists who was embedded with South Vietnamese military units in the war.

During the 1990s he produced several notable documentaries on Australian research in the Antarctic.

Tim Bowden had conducted nearly 120 oral history reports, which are documented and publicly available on the Australian War Memorial website.

Bowden died on 1 September 2024, at the age of 87.

== Awards ==
- Appointed Member of the Order of Australia (AM) in the 1994 Birthday Honours for services to broadcasting.
- Centenary Medal, 2001
- Honorary Doctorate of Letters, University of Tasmania, 1997

== Books ==
- Bowden, Tim (1987). One Crowded Hour: Neil Davis - Combat Cameraman (1934 - 1985). Sydney: Collins. ISBN 978-0-00-217496-1. OCLC 27487367.
- Bowden, Tim (1990). The Backchat Book. ABC Enterprises. ISBN 978-0-7333-0000-4.
- Bowden, Tim (1991). Antarctica and Back in Sixty Days. ABC Enterprises. ISBN 978-0-733-30113-1. OCLC 42579604.
- Bowden, Tim (1992). The Way My Father Tells It: The Story of an Australian Life. ABC Books. ISBN 978-0-733-30010-3.
- Bowden, Tim (1993). Changi Photographer: George Aspinall's Record of Captivity. Sydney: ABC. ISBN 978-0-7333-0287-9.
- Bowden, Tim (1997). The Silence Calling: Australians in Antarctica 1947–97. Allen & Unwin. ISBN 978-1-86448-311-6. OCLC 38199808.
- Bowden, Tim (1999). Penelope Goes West: On the Road from Sydney to Margaret River and Back. Allen & Unwin. ISBN 978-1-86508-066-6.
- Bowden, Tim (2002). Penelope Bungles to Broome. Allen & Unwin. ISBN 978-1-74343-221-1.
- Bowden, Tim (2003). Spooling Through: An Irreverent Memoir. Allen & Unwin. ISBN 978-1-741-14026-2. OCLC 52468798.
- Bowden, Tim (2004). No Tern Unstoned: Musings at Breakfast. ABC Books. ISBN 978-0-733-31444-5.
- Bowden, Tim (2004). This Can't Happen to Me! Tackling Type 2 Diabetes. Allen & Unwin. ISBN 978-1-74115-163-3. OCLC 765574539.
- Bowden, Tim (2006). Aunty's Jubilee! Celebrating 50 Years of ABC-TV. ABC Books. ISBN 978-0-733-31840-5.
- Bowden, Tim (2008). The Devil in Tim: Travels in Tasmania. Allen & Unwin. ISBN 978-1-74176-268-6. OCLC 437209128.
- Bowden, Tim (2008). Down Under in the Top End: Penelope Heads North. Allen & Unwin. ISBN 978-1-74176-225-9.
- Bowden, Tim (2012). The Changi Camera: A Unique Record of Changi and the Thai-Burma Railway. Hachette Australia. ISBN 978-0-733-62962-4. OCLC 812481722.
- Bowden, Tim (2014). Stubborn Buggers: Survivors of the Infamous POW Gaol That Made Changi Look Like Heaven. Allen & Unwin. ISBN 978-1-743-31442-5. OCLC 974257852.
- Bowden, Tim (2019). Larrikins in Khaki: Tales of Irreverence and Courage From World War II Diggers. Allen & Unwin. ISBN 978-1-760-52854-6. OCLC 1107607352.
- Bowden, Tim (2023). Ros Bowden: Trailblazer. ETT. ISBN 978-1-922-69882-7. OCLC 1340542563.

== Sources ==
- Tim Bowden (Australian Broadcasting Corporation)
