= Julius Kruttschnitt II =

Australian mining engineer (1885–1974)

Julius Kruttschnitt II MAusIMM
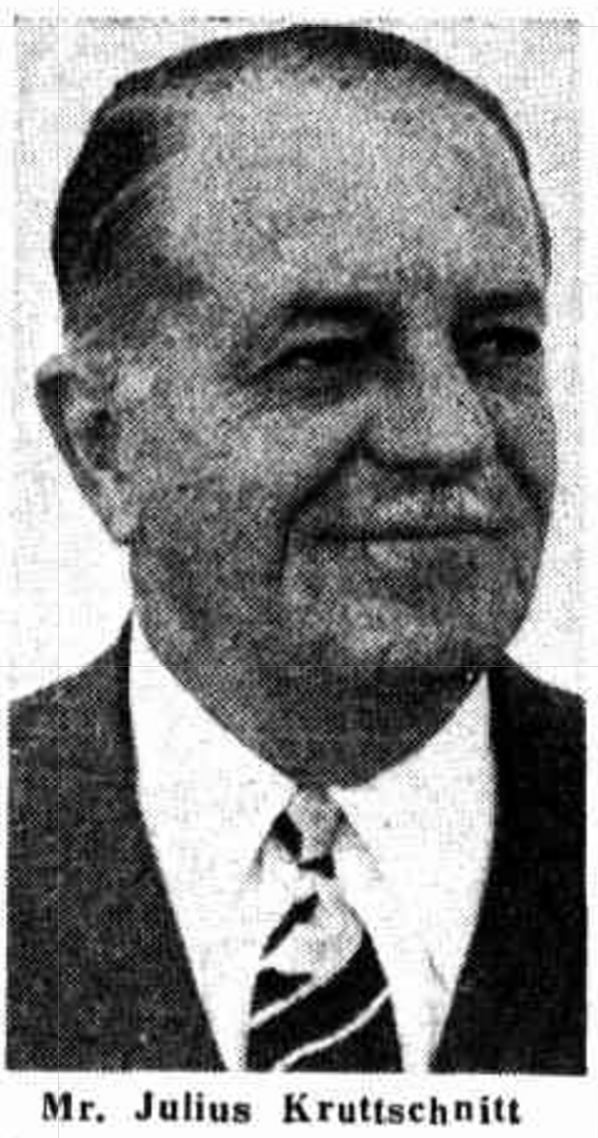
- Kruttschnitt, 1946
- Born: 7 May 1885; New Orleans, Louisiana, U.S.
- Died: 23 September 1974 (aged 89); Brisbane, Queensland, Australia
- Citizenship: United States (by birthplace), Australia (1965)
- Education: Yale University
- Occupation: Mining manager
- Father: Julius Kruttschnitt
- Awards: Member, AusIMM; Member, AIME

Julius Kruttschnitt II MAusIMM (7 May 1885 – 23 September 1974) was an American-born Australian mining manager, who helped to establish the mining industry in Queensland, Australia.

== Early life and career ==
Kruttschnitt was born 7 May 1885 in New Orleans, Louisiana. He was the son of Julius Kruttschnitt and his wife Wilhelmina. He was the great nephew of US Sen Judah P Benjamin (La)and CSA Secretary of War and Treasury. Grandmother of Sephardic Jewish ancestry and managed Belle Chasse, Sen Benjamin's cotton plantation. His grandfather was a Prussian consul in New Orleans, Louisiana. The elder Kruttschnitt was a railway engineer who would go on to become the Chairman of the Southern Pacific railroad company, which also laid tracks for their line in Mexico. After an early education in Belmont, California, Julius Kruttschnitt II went to Yale University, graduating with a B.Phil. in 1906. After a year of postgraduate work, he took a position as a mine surveyor with the Arizona Copper Company. Kruttschnitt married Marie Rose Pickering in San Francisco, California in 1907. He would join the mining department of the American Smelting and Refining Company (ASARCO) at their Reforma lead mine in Mexico in 1909. He then moved to Asientos, Mexico to oversee their silver mine. Kruttschnitt was recalled back to Tucson, Arizona in 1912 to oversee the company's mining department and remained there until 1930.

== Management of Mount Isa Mines ==
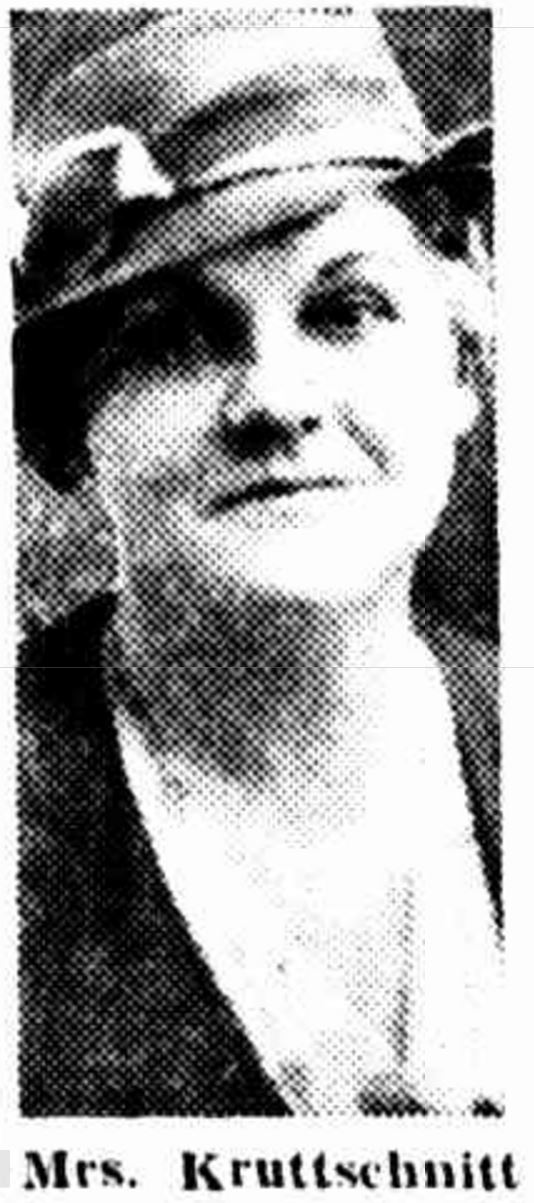
Marie, first wife of Julius Kruttschnitt, 1940

In July 1930, Kruttschnitt took a position for ASARCO in Australia as general manager of Mount Isa Mines Ltd, Queensland. It is probable that it was described as a short term position. However the company was close to bankruptcy. After an agreement by ASARCO to make a million dollar loan to Mount Isa Mines Ltd, the mine and smelters began producing their first lead bullion in mid 1931. Under Kruttschnitt's management, it would take six years until the mine cleared a profit in 1937 largely due to worldwide ore prices and the need for better extraction and milling methods, and another ten before dividends were paid to investors. Kruttschnitt was well liked by the mine's employees, as he took an interest in providing better housing for employees and their families and improving community relations, while General Manager. Kruttschnitt was appointed a director of Mount Isa Mines Ltd in 1931. He was later appointed chairman of the board in 1937, remaining in the role until 1953 when he retired as chairman. He continued on the board until 1967.

His wife Marie (née Pickering), also had a popular role in the Mt Isa community. She was active in the Country Women's Association, the Australian Inland Mission and, during the start of World War II, in the Australian Comforts Fund. She died on 4 September 1940 from pneumonia; her body was returned to the USA for burial. In March 1941, a women's club which she had a major role in establishing was named the Marie Kruttschnitt Club in her memory. In 1944, he married his secretary Mrs Edna May Roger (née Maxted) in a private ceremony with Presbyterian rites at his home in Mount Isa. They moved to Twigg St, Indooroopilly in Brisbane after his retirement in 1953. This home was inundated by floodwater during the Brisbane floods of 1974.

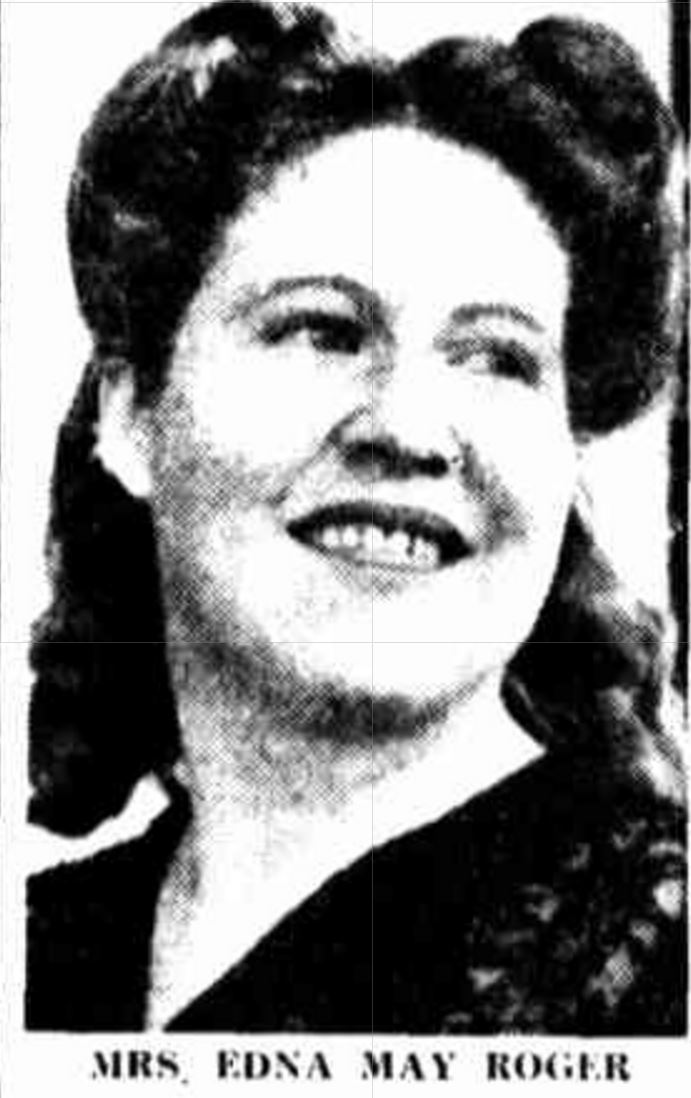
Edna May Roger (née Maxted), second wife of Julius Kruttschnitt, 1944

== Memberships and awards ==
Kruttschnitt was also director of Big Bell Mines Ltd, Anglo-Westralian Mining Pty Ltd, the Mining Trust Ltd, New Guinea Goldfields Ltd and several other companies. He was President of the Queensland Chamber of Mines, established in 1948, for fourteen years. He was president of the Australasian Institute of Mining and Metallurgy in 1939 and 1952. He was awarded a gold medal from the English Institute of Mining and Metallurgy in 1962. He was also awarded the Australasian Institute of Mining and Metallurgy's medal in recognition of his outstanding services to the mining industry of Australia in 1946. He was a member of the American Institute of Mining and Metallurgical Engineers. Kruttschnitt was a member of the Australian Atomic Energy Commission's advisory committee on uranium mining from 1953 to 1960. He sat on the board of the Faculty of Engineering at the University of Queensland from 1954 to 1962. He was granted an honorary Doctorate of Engineering in 1971 from the University of Queensland.

== Later life ==
Kruttschnitt became an Australian citizen in 1965. Kruttschnitt's second wife Edna predeceased him in 1967. He died at the St Andrew's War Memorial Hospital in Brisbane on 23 September 1974. Kruttschnitt was survived by two sons-Julius III and Ernest and two daughters Marie and Barbara from his first marriage and his step-son, Bruce from his second marriage. Kruttschnitt and wife Edna were both cremated and their ashes are interred at the Albany Creek Crematorium.

== Legacy ==
The University of Queensland Julius Kruttschnitt Mineral Research Centre at Finney's Hill, Indooroopilly was named for him in 1971.

His home, Casa Grande, in Mount Isa is listed on the Queensland Heritage Register.
