= J. W. Sutherland =

John Waters Sutherland (16 August 1870 – 27 September 1946) was a mining engineer and metallurgist in Western Australia.

== History ==
Sutherland was born in Scotchmans Lead, Victoria, a son of miner John Sutherland and his wife Wilhelmina Sutherland, née Waters.

Caricature by David Low

Sutherland was living at Allendale, Victoria when he went to Ballarat to study mining chemistry at the School of Mines where Andrew Berry was Registrar. On graduation as an assayer and metallurgist left for Broken Hill, where he served the Broken Hill Proprietary as assayer from 1889 to 1894 and metallurgist from 1894 to 1896. He then worked in Western Australia as metallurgist for Lake View Consols under General Manager H. G. Callahan, from 1896 to 1899, devoting much of his attention to the problem of "slimes", clayey ores that resisted the usual processes of jigging (agitation with water), vanning and froth flotation that concentrated the ore by removing much of the gangue, and resisting the percolation through the mixture of cyanide, as used to remove the gold content. From 1899 to 1929 he worked as metallurgist and General Manager at the Golden Horseshoe Estates, Ltd mine, producing between £300,000 and £400,000 worth of gold annually. Sutherland lost that job in 1929 when the leases passed to Lake View and Star, Ltd, and the huge tailings dump was taken over by Golden Horse Shoe (New), Ltd. He worked as a consulting mining engineer in Perth from 1929 to 1938, then from 1938 to 1946 was assayer for the Phoenix Gold Mine in Coolgardie.

Sutherland, like captains Hancock, Warren and Greenway at Moonta and Broken Hill, addressed the "sulphide problem", refractory ores such as galena (zinc sulphide) that unlike the associated silver and lead compounds, resisted reduction to the base metal by roasting. The outcome was that mine sites were littered with great mounds of tailings, potentially valuable but unsightly and dangerous, and the airborne dust invasive and poisonous; difficult to smelt and too contaminated to ship economically to Europe. While at the Lake View Consols, Sutherland revolutionized the washing of "slimes", and incidentally saved a great deal of valuable water, when he developed the filter-pressing process using a Dehne filter press, already in use in Queensland in the extraction of sugar from macerated cane. The filter press was adopted by other mines, and continued to be used until supplanted around 1930 by the less labor-intensive Oliver filter. While manager of Golden Horseshoe Estates Ltd. he was mentor to up-and-coming metallurgists at the Kalgoorlie School of Mines, with whom he developed techniques for treating gold tellurides.

Sutherland never married. He died in a private hospital at the age of 76 years; his remains were buried at the Karrakatta cemetery, Western Australia.

== Other interests ==
- He was a member of the Australasian Institute of Mining Engineers and its president in 1918
- In 1901 Sutherland was elected to the executive, Chamber of Mines of Western Australia and a vice-president in 1902. He was made an honorary member in 1930.
- He was a member of the Hannan's Club and a Freemason.
