= John Ralston (chemist) =

Australian chemist and researcher (born 1946)

John Ralston AO FAA FTSE FRACI HonFAusIMM
- Born: John Ralston; 20 June 1946 (age 79); Melbourne, Victoria, Australia
- Education: Christ Church Grammar School; Melbourne High School
- Alma mater: University of Melbourne; University of London
- Occupations: Physical chemist; researcher; academic

John Ralston (born 20 June 1946) is an Australian physical and colloid chemist with training in metallurgy, whose research embraces various aspects of interfacial science and engineering. He was made the Professor at the School of Chemical Technology at the University of South Australia (UniSA) in 1984. In addition, he was the Director of the Sir Ian Wark Research Institute of the UniSA between 1994 and 2012. Ralston was awarded South Australian of the Year in 2007 due to his research.

== Education ==
Ralston began his education in Melbourne at Christ Church Grammar School in South Yarra. He completed his High School Certificate (HSC) at Melbourne High School in 1964. Between 1965 and 1975, he completed his Bachelor of Science in Physical Chemistry (BScHons) and continued to do his Master of Science (MS) and finally his PhD; all at the University of Melbourne. After this, Ralston studied and worked alongside other chemists at Swinburne University, Imperial College London, University of Bristol and had a sabbatical at the Wageningen University in The Netherlands in 1979. Throughout the 1970s, Ralston studied in the United Kingdom, until returning to Australia after being offered the post of Professor of the School of Chemical Technology at the then South Australian Institute of Technology (SAIT), the precursor to the University of South Australia in 1983.

== Career ==
=== UniSA ===
In March 1984, Ralston joined the UniSA as the head of the School of Chemical Technology. During this time of work, he gathered further support and financial funds to expand programs and research for students at the University. He mainly concentrated his efforts on interfacial science and engineering, with an importance on practical actions in his research. This further research led him to gain the funding of a new research institute on the campus.

Due to Ralston's work at the UniSA, the University has established the Ralston Medal for Excellence in Physical Chemistry and also the John Ralston Chair in Minerals and Resource Engineering for his scientific legacy.

=== Wark Institute ===
In 1994, Ralston established at the UniSA, the Ian Wark Research Institute, in honour of Sir Ian Wark's contribution to chemistry. Ralston would be its first director. Between 1994 and 2012, the 'Wark' Institute as it came to be referred to, endeavoured to research into minerals and materials used for the mining industry and also for other researchers in Australia. The Wark had a close association with the Industrial Chemistry Division of the CSIRO as well as the Australian Research Council. Over time, the Wark would come to employ over 180 academic staff and research students with an annual budget of $20 million. These successes were due to Ralston's research as well as his networking with the mining industry and researchers at the UniSA.

In the early 2000s, Ralston also established and became the principal researcher at the Australian Mineral Science Research Institute (AMSRI), which attempted at further collaboration in particle science and engineering with the University of Queensland (facilitated by Alban Lynch) and with the Australian Minerals Industry Research Association (AMIRA) International (led by Jim May). Due to these collaborative initiatives, led by Ralston, the Wark received over $200 million in grant funding from the Australian Research Council, as well as returning over $1.5 billion in profit for the minerals industry, due to this research. Despite retiring in 2012, Ralston still partially works at the UniSA as an Emeritus Professor.

== Honours, awards and fellowships ==
=== Honours ===
- 2001 – Centenary Medal "For service to Australian society in colloid and surface chemistry"
- 2002 – Honorary Doctorate at the Abo Akademi University in Finland
- 2000s – Honorary Professorships at the University of Tokyo in Japan and Tianjin University in China
- 2006 – Appointed Laureate Professor by the University of South Australia
- 2008 – Officer of the Order of Australia (AO) "For service to science and to scientific research, particularly in the field of physical chemistry and minerals processing, to education and to the creation and application of new scientific knowledge to industry"
- 2012 – Appointed Emeritus Laureate Professor by the University of South Australia

=== Awards ===
- 2006 – Chemeca Medal for Outstanding Service and Contribution to Chemical
- 2007 – South Australian of the Year
- 2007 – South Australian Scientist of the Year
- 2009 – Clunies Ross Lifetime Achievement Award of the Australian Academy of Technological Sciences and Engineering

=== Fellowships ===
- 1993 – Fellow of the Australian Academy of Technological Sciences and Engineering (FTSE)
- 2005 – Fellow of the Australian Academy of Science (FAA)
- 2000s – Fellow Royal Australian Chemical Institute (FRACI)
- 2020 – Honorary Fellow of the Australasian Institute of Mining and Metallurgy (HonFAusIMM)
