= Ernest Lidgey =

Australian Geologist

Ernest Lidgey (22 June 1863 – 16 February 1925) was an Australian geologist who conducted important geological surveys of mining areas in Victoria, Australia.

== History ==
Lidgey was born in Adelaide the son of John Lidgey (1834–1887) and his wife Hanna Lidgey, née Cornish, both immigrants from Redruth, Cornwall, who were married 20 August 1862 at the Friends meeting house, Adelaide. They had another child, Lilian Mary Lidgey, in Norwood on 22 October 1864, before in September 1865 returning to Cornwall.

Lidgey was educated in England, returning around 1880 to Victoria, where he was appointed a probationary assistant to Reginald A. F. Murray, Government geologist, who required extra hands to complete the geological survey of the Colony. His tasks included the Mount Wills tin mining district, Ballarat, Malmsbury and Lauriston.

In 1897, he was promoted to Assistant Geological Surveyor. Late December that year, he was appointed Government Mining Representative in London, but resigned less than a year later, returning around 1 July 1898.

Lidgey joined the Brunswick syndicate, an English consortium, as consulting engineer and manager of the Hampton Plains mines, resigning in September 1902. He then set up in London as a consulting engineer, and, no longer in the Government employ, was scathing in the criticism of Victoria's Department of Mines.

He returned to Australia in 1903 with an "Electric Ore Finder" for which he had purchased a licence, and brought a set of apparatus and a team of operators to Australia and conducted various trials, the first geophysical surveys for minerals in Australia.

The last years of Lidgey's life are a mystery. His wife, who died in 1921, left her estate valued at some £2,800 to him in her Will dated 1908, but apart from a death notice in The Argus, he appears not to have been otherwise mentioned in newspapers since mention in 1907 of the 1904 Ore-Finder trials.

== Memberships ==
- Member, Australasian Association and acted as vice-president of Section C (Geology) in 1894.
- Member, Australasian Institute of Mining Engineers and president 1901
- Associate, Royal Society of Victoria
- Member, Institution of Mining and Metallurgy, London, 1906–1909

== Other interests ==
- He may have been an amateur botanist, as he is noted for collecting Eucalyptus stricklandii (in 1911 ?).

== Family ==
Lidgey married Blanche Randall Wasley ( – 16 September 1921) on 27 November 1895. They appear to have had no children.

Blanche died at their home on Balaclava road, Caulfield, Victoria; Ernest died at 6 Imperial Avenue, Caulfield, and his remains were privately interred in the Brighton Cemetery.

Ernest had three sisters:

- Lilian Mary Lidgey (22 October 1864 – )
- Hannah Cornish "Nance" Lidgey (1869 – ) married Albert Milner at St Kilda, Victoria on 11 February 1853.
- Agnes Beatrice Lidgey (1875 – 4 September 1933) lived at 6 Imperial Avenue, Caulfield.
