= Richard Hamilton (mining) =

Mine Manager in Western Australia

Richard Hamilton (6 May 1855 or 29 April 1855 – 16 March 1943) was a mine manager at Boulder, Western Australia.

== History ==
Caricature by David Low

Hamilton was born in Williamstown, Victoria, the son of Mary Isobel Hamilton, née Cameron (1833 – 26 Jan 1880) and Henry West Hamilton, originally from Ballymoney, Ireland and proprietor of the Pegleg Hotel, Pegleg Gully, near modern Maldon. He had a younger sister born on 14 August 1856. His father died on 12 July 1858, when Richard Hamilton was 3. His father was 30. His younger sister, Mary Hamilton, the daughter, died of diphtheria at the Pegleg Hotel on 4 April 1860, when she was 4.

On 1 January 1863 the widow Hamilton married Frederick Clark, who adopted Richard Hamilton.

Frederick Clark J.P. (c. 1835 – 4 July 1918) of Lester Street, Eaglehawk perhaps 20 km from Pegleg Gully, was proprietor of a quartz crushing plant, Justice of the Peace and three times Mayor of Eaglehawk. He married twice: to the widow Hamilton in January 1863, and to his cousin, the widow Mrs Elizabeth Rayner (c. 1837 – 3 May 1921), on 13 June 1881.

Hamilton was educated at the Corporate High School and at the School of Mines, Bendigo, and gained practical experience on the Victorian goldfields. Early in the 1880s he was appointed manager of the Honnali gold mine in Mysore, India. Three years later he returned to Victoria and took control of the Peel River Proprietary gold mines in New South Wales. He then spent some years as a fruitgrower at Mooroopna, Victoria near Shepparton in the Goulburn Valley. He left for the US in 1893 to manage the Cañada del Oro (Canyon of Gold) Company's mine in Arizona, leaving his wife to manage the orchard. In 1896 he was appointed general manager of the Great Boulder Mine and returned to Australia. Katie joined him the following year.

On his retirement in 1927 the company appointing him its local director in recognition of his 40 years' service.

The Hamiltons had a home at 23 Leake street, Peppermint Grove, but in later years he lived in Cottesloe. He died in a private hospital, Perth, a month short of his 89th birthday, after some years of failing health, and was interred at the Karrakatta cemetery.

Hamilton Street, Boulder, Western Australia, was named for him.

== Other interests ==
- In 1897 Hamilton was elected president of the Kalgoorlie Chamber of Mines and Commerce, and held that position for three years, then on 28 February 1901 he was elected charter president of its successor, the Chamber of Mines of Western Australia, a position he held until his death.
- Hamilton was a member of the Australasian Institute of Mining Engineers, its president in 1909 and vice-president 1910
- In 1915, Hamilton, George Ridgway and Frank A. Moss purchased the old Lancefield mine, at Beria, Western Australia, regarded as exhausted, and worked it profitably until 1921, when it closed for good.
- He was a board member, Wiluna Gold Mines, Ltd.
- He was a member of the exclusive Weld Club, Perth, and Hannans Club, Kalgoorlie.

== Family ==
Hamilton married Kate Muriel "Kit" "Katie" Clark (– 23 July 1926) on 30 July 1888. Clark was a daughter of John Hall Clark (c. 1831 – 26 May 1875) of Warwick, England, and niece of Hamilton's stepfather Frederick Clark JP (c. 1835 – 4 July 1918). They had two sons and one daughter:

- Frederick Clark Hamilton (1890 – 22 September 1948), of "Warwick Park" farm, Moora, Western Australia married Kathleen Irene Hannah Sullivan (1895–1923), only daughter of Joseph Sullivan, of Perth, on 28 September 1914. He married again, to Caroline Mary Sedgwick (1892–) on 11 May 1925; she was mother of Frederick Hamilton.

- Richard Hamilton (17 September 1915 – 24 June 1944) drowned as result of torpedoing of Tamahoko Maru by USS Tang near Nagasaki while a POW of Japan.
- Kathleen Hamilton (8 August 1918 – died before 1944)
- Mary Hamilton (24 March 1922 –) married Philip Alan Sandland after September 1943
- Elizabeth "Betty" Hamilton (1923–2014) married David LeFroy
- Frederick Hamilton

- (Mary) Elizabeth Hamilton
- Rev. Richard West Hamilton (4 July 1902 –) of Oxford, England

- Richard Allan Hamilton (19 June 1933 –)

Children of Fred Clark
Mary E. C. Clark (c. 1866 – 8 September 1902), married Robert McNaughton
Elizabeth Isabella "Lizzie" Clark (died 30 March 1942) married Thomas Maughan of Kalgoorlie on 25 October 1899.

Other family members
Hubert Ratcliff Clark (died 27 April 1948) was a brother of Hamilton's wife Katie; he worked at the Boulder Mine.
