= Alban Lynch =

Australian mining engineer (1930–2021)

Alban Lynch AO HonFAusIMM
- Born: Alban Jude Lynch; 15 August 1930; Queensland, Australia
- Died: 17 September 2021 (aged 91)
- Education: Christian Brothers College
- Alma mater: Sydney Technical College; University of New South Wales; University of Queensland
- Occupations: Chemical engineer; academic; company director
- Awards: Officer of the Order of Australia; Honorary Fellow of the Australasian Institute of Mining and Metallurgy; Complete list

Alban Jude Lynch (15 August 1930 – 17 September 2021) was an Australian mining engineer and academic who helped develop the mineral processing teaching experience for mining students.

== Early life ==
Alban Lynch was born in Queensland in 1930. He attended the Christian Brothers College, St Patricks, Strathfield. He worked as an industrial chemist between 1947 and 1953 while studying his Diploma of Chemical Engineering part time through the Sydney Technical College.

== Career ==
After completing his diploma Lynch worked as a metallurgist with the Zinc Corporation of Broken Hill from 1954 to 1958. Here he worked with Maurice Mawby. He studied a BSc externally from the University of New South Wales graduating in 1956. He took his PhD from the University of Queensland in 1965 and a DSc from the University of New South Wales in 1975.

Lynch joined the staff of the University of Queensland's Department of Mining and Metallurgical Engineering as a Research Officer in 1958. He began work on an Australian Mineral Industries Research Association (AMIRA) project on grinding in 1962. He worked with Jim May, who was the CEO of AMIRA for a number of decades from the late 1960s. This was conducted at Mount Isa Mines (MIM) using circuits in its old concentrator to conduct their experiments. James Foots, the General Manager of Mount Isa Mines supported the project during this time. This project continues at the Julius Kruttschnitt Mineral Research Centre (JKMRC) and other universities.

== Establishment of the JKMRC ==
In 1971, Mount Isa Mines established the Julius Kruttschnitt Mineral Research Centre at the site of the former Indooroopilly Silver Mine in Brisbane, Queensland owned by the University of Queensland. Lynch was founding director and continued in the role until 1989. He pioneered the early use of computers to produce comminution and classification models which used operational plant data. This enabled simulation modelling of crushers, grinding mills, hydrocyclones and flotation. He pursued field blasting research, which has improved practice and measurement internationally. His network of industry and academic colleagues led to fieldwork opportunities for students and he supervised over 30 doctoral students during his time as director.

Lynch was Head of Mining and Metallurgical Engineering at the university from 1988 until his retirement in 1993. He continued to lecture on modelling and establishing research programmes in countries such as Malaysia, Brazil, Mexico and Turkey.

He has published a number of books and written over 150 technical publications.

== Personal life ==
Lynch married Barbara, who was from Broken Hill, in 1955 and had 7 children. The eldest 2 were born in Broken Hill and the following 5 in Brisbane.

== Books ==
- Mineral Crushing and Grinding Circuits (1977)
- Mineral and Coal Flotation Circuits (1980) with N.W. Johnson, E.V. Manlapig and C.G. Thorne
- Optimising fragmentation for overburden removal in strip mining (1984)
- The History of Grinding (2005) with Chester Rowland
- The History of Flotation (2010) with Greg Harbort and Mike Nelson
- Comminution Handbook (2015)

== Awards and memberships ==
- 1978 – President's Award from the Australasian Institute of Mining and Metallurgy (AusIMM)
- 1985 – Richards Award from the American Institute of Mining, Metallurgical and Petroleum Engineers
- 1989 – AusIMM Distinguished Speaker Exchange Program
- 1991 – AusIMM Sir Willis Connolly Medal
- 1993 – Institute Medal from the AusIMM
- 1999 – Officer of the Order of Australia (AO) “for service to the mining industry, particularly in the area of research and education"
- 2000 – AM Gaudin Award from the Society for Mining, Metallurgy and Exploration, “for his many contributions to the simulation and control of comminution and flotation circuits.”
- 2004 – Honorary Fellowship from the Australasian Institute of Mining and Metallurgy (HonFAusIMM) “in recognition of his outstanding contribution to the minerals Industry over many years which has previously been recognised through 50 years membership in 2004.”
- 1989 – President, AusIMM
- 2010 – Lifetime Achievement Award of the International Mineral Processing Congress
- 2013 – International Mining Hall of Fame induction
