= Jim May (chemical engineer) =

Australian chemical engineer and metallurgist (1934–2023)

Jim May AM FTSE HonFAusIMM
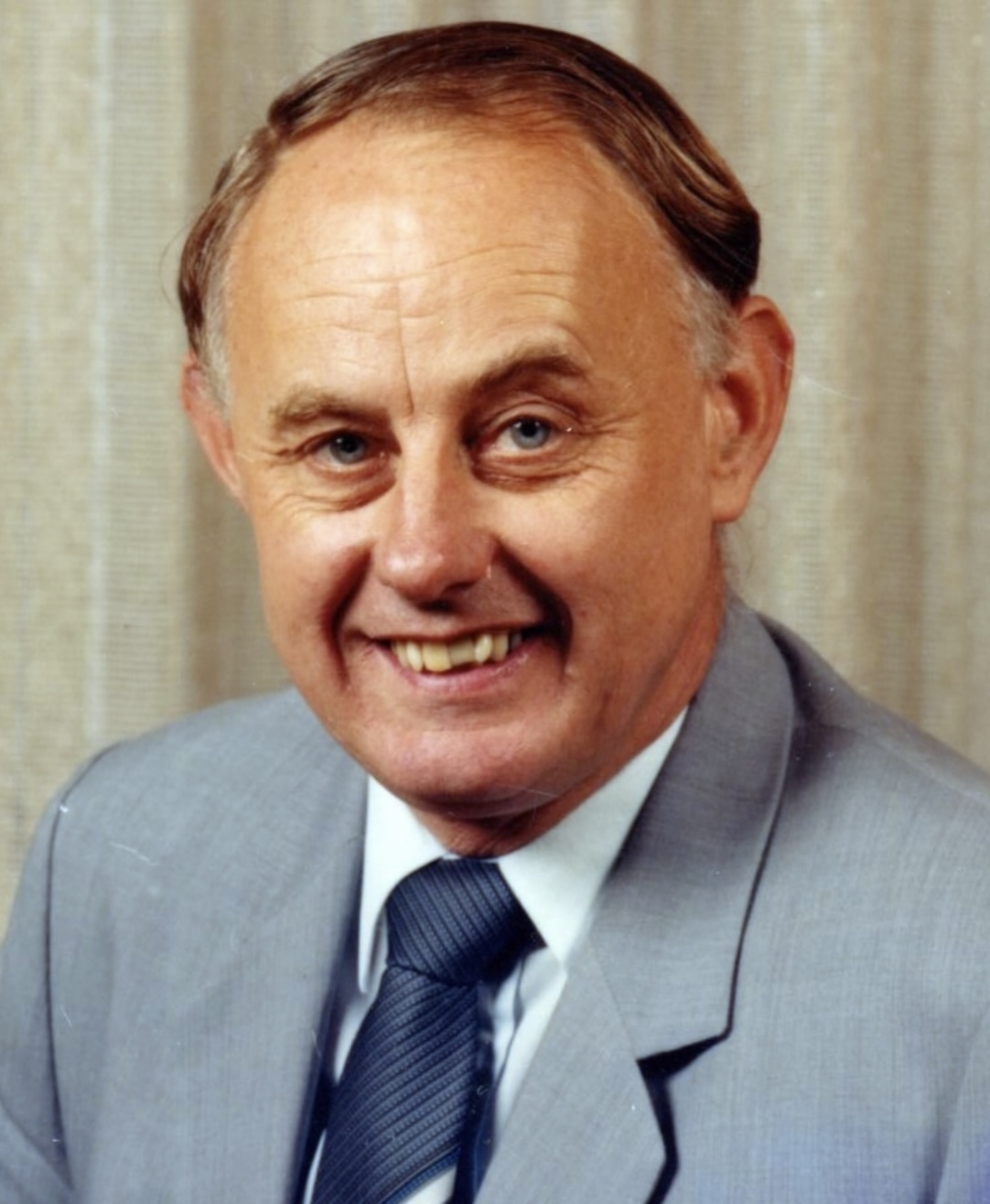
- May c. 1980s
- Born: James Richard May; 20 July 1934; Kensington Gardens, South Australia, Australia
- Died: 6 June 2023 (aged 88); Macleod, Victoria, Australia
- Education: Adelaide High School
- Alma mater: University of Adelaide; University of New South Wales
- Occupations: Chemical engineer; metallurgist; company director
- Relatives: Richard Pope
- Awards: Member of the Order of Australia

James Richard May (20 July 1934 – 6 June 2023) was an Australian chemical engineer and metallurgist who was the chief executive officer of the Australian Minerals Industry Research Association (AMIRA) between 1968 and 1994. He was also on various academic committees in a number of institutions and organisations.

== Early life and education ==
Jim May was born in Kensington Gardens, Adelaide in 1934 to Eric May and Ellen Miners. He had two brothers: John and Lynton May.

Between 1946 and 1951, May was educated at Adelaide High School where he boarded for a number of years before graduating in late 1951. From 1952, he studied at the University of Adelaide where he completed his Bachelor of Metallurgical and Chemical Engineering (ChE) in 1957 and his Master of Science (MSc) in 1961 at the University of New South Wales. However, during his university days, he played for the South Australian Hockey Team. In the lead up to the 1956 Melbourne Olympics, he declined the opportunity to play in the Australian Hockey Team for the Olympics.

He married Christine May (née Field) in March 1959. They had two sons and one daughter together. On 6 June 2023, May died in Macleod, a suburb of Melbourne.

== Career ==
=== Early career ===
May began his career as a metallurgist at Broken Hill South Mine Limited between 1957 and 1958. In June 1958, he moved to the Australian Atomic Energy Commission (AAEC) as an Experimental Officer. He worked there until 1968, predominantly at the HIFAR Lucas Heights Nuclear Reactor which had only gone critical in April 1958. This role led him to work abroad with the United Kingdom Atomic Energy Authority in 1963. Following this, May went to the Oak Ridge National Laboratory in the United States in 1964 and 1965. He was a guest scientist in both countries in which he studied for Australia's interest in the manufacturing and reprocessing of nuclear fuels. In 1967, he was appointed head of the Chemical Engineering Section of the Australian Commission but soon left in 1968 to become the chief executive officer of the Australian Minerals Industry Research Association (AMIRA).

=== AMIRA ===
In 1968, May became the first permanent CEO of AMIRA. This organisation became an advisory group for governments around the world that endeavoured to research into developing and managing new technologies and mitigation strategies in the mining and metallurgy fields. He also established a framework called the ‘AMIRA model’ in which research and development (R&D) costs and intellectual property was shared with many research bodies globally. The Australian Mining Hall of Fame described him in 2016 as a “…driving force for the development and formalisation of collaborative research within the minerals industry, across all technical disciplines, for over 25 years”.

=== Later career ===
In 1952, May joined the Australasian Institute of Mining and Metallurgy (AusIMM) and served on its various committees throughout the latter half of the 20th century. Later, AusIMM awarded him the Institute Medal in 1992 and named him the Distinguished Lecturer to the USA in 1995. In this time, May had been a board member on multiple Cooperative Research Centres including the Centre for Mining Technology and Equipment at the University of Queensland as well as a director of the Australian Minerals and Energy Environment Foundation. In addition, May worked on advisory committees for many university departments and several divisions of the Commonwealth Scientific and Industrial Research Organisation (CSIRO) and the Australian Centre for Minesite Rehabilitation Research. Moreover, he also had an important role in the success of the Julius Kruttschnitt Mineral Research Centre (JKMRC) with Alban Lynch. Similar to this, May pursused a close association with the Sir James Foots School of Mineral Resources at the University of Queensland and the Sir Ian Wark Research Institute with John Ralston at the University of South Australia between 1994 and 2010.

Upon retiring in 1994, May was invited by AusIMM to lecture about his career at various mining engineering institutes throughout the United States in 1995. This was where he received an honorary award as the ‘distinguished lecturer’ from AusIMM and the American Institute of Mining, Metallurgical, and Petroleum Engineers (AIME).

== Honours and awards ==
- 1992 – The Institute Medal of the Australasian Institute of Mining and Metallurgy "In recognition of his outstanding contribution to the initiation and management of mineral research and technology through his role as Chief Executive Officer of AMIRA and involvement with research organisations throughout Australia"
- 1992 – The Eureka Australian Museum Prize for Industry
- 1993 – Honorary Doctorate of the University of South Australia (Hon. DUniv)
- 1994 – Honorary Doctorate of Philosophy of the University of Queensland (Hon. DPhil)
- 1994 – Fellow of the Australian Academy of Technological Sciences and Engineering (FTSE)
- 1995 – The Distinguished Lecturer for the Australasian Institute of Mining and Metallurgy and the American Institute of Mining, Metallurgical, and Petroleum Engineers
- 2001 – Centenary Medal "For service to Australian society in mineral science and engineering"
- 2016 – The Australian Prospectors & Miners' Hall of Fame in Technology and Science Award
- 2021 – Honorary Fellow of the Australasian Institute of Mining and Metallurgy (HonFAusIMM)
- 2024 – Member of the Order of Australia (AM) "For significant service to mining research and governance, and to the community"
