= Frederick Power =

Frederick Power may refer to:

- F. Danvers Power (1861–1955), Australian academic
- Frederick Belding Power (1853–1927), American chemist
