= Robert S. Black =

New Zealand mine manager (1860–1934)

Robert Silvers Black (1860 – 30 March 1934) was mine manager of Kalgurli Mines.

== History ==
Black was a son of William Black, of Milburn, in Otago, New Zealand, and born in nearby Milton. He was educated at several public and private schools, and joined the National Bank, where for a year in 1880/1881 he was involved in the assay and smelting office, then returned to regular banking for seventeen years, serving in various managerial positions.

He left for Tasmania around 1890, to take up a position as general director of a company on the newly developed Zeehan silver fields. In 1895 he left Tasmania for Western Australia, to take up a position as manager of the Londonderry mine near Coolgardie, and held that position until 1898, when he resigned to manage the group of mines owned by the English Octagon Explorers syndicate, which included the Crusoe, Friday, Menzies Consolidated, Block 45 and Kalgurli United mines at Kalgoorlie. When in 1901 Octagon Explorers surrendered their lease 879E, the four sections were picked up by Black. In April 1900 he succeeded Charles S. Stafford as managing director of Kalgurli and Hainault mines and held that position until 1903, when ill-health forced him to resign.

From 1903 to 1907 he lived in Melbourne and in New Zealand, then accepted a call by the Kalgurli company to return to Kalgoorlie, where he would manage the Kalgurli and Archie Hay the Hainault, following the retirement of general manager Frank A. Moss.

By 1917 the Kalgurli mine was barely profitable and by 1920 was practically worked out, and most of the ore processed was for tributers working other mines. In November 1921 he retired to Perth, farewelled by a few friends. He had developed an interest in the pastoral life, and with his son Robin took over Atley Station near Sandstone, raising sheep. He also had Roy Hill station, which he relinquished around 1925. By 1940 Atley Station was in the hands of Phil Broadhurst.

He died in a Perth private hospital in 1934 after a short illness, aged 73 years.

== Other interests ==
- While in Tasmania Black was one of the first members of Zeehan's Hospital Board, serving as chairman and was one of those behind erection of the new hospital building. He was the first chairman of the School of Mines and chairman of the Cemetery Trust. He was an active investor in mining ventures and a Justice of the Peace.
- He was a member of the Coolgardie Racing Club, and served as its timekeeper; the Western Australia Turf Club, and a committee member to 1900; the Kalgoorlie Racing Club and a member if its committee;
- He was in 1918 appointed a member of the State Repatriation Board.
- Mrs Black was head of training, Senior Cadets, a branch of the Girl Guides Association.
- Black was a member of the Australasian Institute of Mining Engineers and its president in 1917, the Chamber of Mines of Western Australia, of which he was vice-president for several years, and the American Institute of Mining Engineers.
- He was a member of the Melbourne Club.

== Family ==
Black married Ellinor Archer (c. 1866 – 24 January 1902) on 13 January 1898. On 11 June 1903 he married again, to Emily Louisa Browne, fourth daughter of T. A. Browne, better known as "Rolf Boldrewood", author of Robbery Under Arms. Children from those unions include:

- Ellinor Black (1 January 1899 – 23 October 1901) died in Bagshot, England
- Robert Montague "Robin" Black (27 May 1900 – ) married Ellen Mary "Nell" Manford, eldest daughter of Frank Manford, on 6 February 1935. In partnership with his father, he owned Atley Station, where, after the death of his father, his mother and sister Judith would spend the winter.
- Ellinor Black (c. 1901 – 14 April 1904) died at Woodend, Victoria
- Judith Emily Black (5 April 1904 – ), socialite, was engaged to be married in early 1936 to John Yorke Birch Sharpe of the Royal Artillery.
- Hubert Silvers Black (17 January 1906 – 22 October 1985) married Margaret Moira Bryans (died c. 1942) on 11 October 1933. He married again, to war widow (of Peter Macdonald, son of Duncan Macdonald MLA) Orme Augusta Marsh Macdonald, née Bell (18 May 1914 – 11 February 2008), of Boonah, Queensland on 21 January 1947. He was a solicitor in the firm of Blake and Riggall, Melbourne.
- Marjory Lilian Black (12 February 1907 – ) perhaps married Thomas George Arbuthnot (1911 – 25 February 1988) of Bonnie Doon, Victoria

His sister Edith Helen Black married Robert Gordon Hyndman at Melton, New Zealand on 29 December 1891.

Thomas Glasgow Black (died 7 October 1915), William Hugh Black, and Robert Black, butchers of Kalgoorlie, were his brothers.
