= Baron Greenway =

Barony in the Peerage of the United Kingdom

Baron Greenway, of Stanbridge Earls in the County of Southampton, is a title in the Peerage of the United Kingdom. It was created in 1927 for Sir Charles Greenway, 1st Baronet, one of the founders of the Anglo-Persian Oil Company. He had already been created a Baronet, of Stanbridge Earls in the County of Southampton, in 1919. As of 2017 the titles are held by his great-grandson, the fourth Baron, who succeeded his father in 1975. Lord Greenway is one of the ninety elected hereditary peers that remain in the House of Lords after the passing of the House of Lords Act 1999, and sits as a cross-bencher.

== Barons Greenway (1927) ==
- Sir Charles Greenway, 1st Baron Greenway (1857–1934)
- Charles Kelvynge Greenway, 2nd Baron Greenway (1888–1963)
- Charles Paul Greenway, 3rd Baron Greenway (1917–1975)
- Ambrose Charles Drexel Greenway, 4th Baron Greenway (b. 1941)

The heir presumptive is the present holder's nephew Nicholas Walter Paul Greenway (b. 1988).

Coat of arms of Baron Greenway
Crest A griffin’s head Or erased Gules holding in the beak an anchor Sable. Escutcheon Per pale Ermine and Ermines on a chief Azure a crescent between two covered cups Or. Supporters On either side a griffin Sable beak and claws Or holding in the beak an anchor and charged on the shoulder with a covered cup Gold. Motto Labore Et Honore (Industry And Honour)
