= Charles Greenway, 1st Baron Greenway =

British businessman (1857 - 1934)

Lord Greenway in 1927

Charles Greenway, 1st Baron Greenway (13 June 1857 – 17 December 1934), known as Sir Charles Greenway, 1st Baronet, from 1919 to 1927, was a British businessman and co-founder of the company that became known as British Petroleum (BP).

Greenway was the son of John David Greenway of Taunton in Somerset. He was a senior partner in the firm of Shaw Wallace & Co of India and Ceylon and of R. G. Shaw & Co of London.

He became associated with the Burmah Oil Company, and later joined forces with William Knox D'Arcy, of the Mount Morgan Mining Company, in developing the oil concessions d'Arcy had won from the Persian government. Together, and with capital from the British Government, they founded the Anglo-Persian Oil Company, which made the Empire largely independent of other powers in the supply of petroleum. To the great benefit of the Treasury, he resisted post-war pressures to privatize the company.

Greenway was created Baronet of Wenhaston in the County of Suffolk, in 1919, and in 1927 retired as chairman of Anglo-Persian Oil, and in recognition of his service to the nation was raised to the peerage as Baron Greenway, of Stanbridge Earls in the County of Southampton.

== Family ==
Lord Greenway married Mabel, daughter of Edwin Augustine Tower, in 1883. He died in December 1934, aged 77, and was succeeded in his titles by his son Charles. Lady Greenway died in 1940. Thomas John Greenway, a prominent mining metallurgist in Australia, was a brother.

Coat of arms of Charles Greenway, 1st Baron Greenway
Crest A griffin’s head Or erased Gules holding in the beak an anchor Sable. Escutcheon Per pale Ermine and Ermines on a chief Azure a crescent between two covered cups Or. Supporters On either side a griffin Sable beak and claws Or holding in the beak an anchor and charged on the shoulder with a covered cup Gold. Motto Labore Et Honore (Industry And Honour)

Peerage of the United Kingdom
New creation	Baron Greenway; 1927–1934	Succeeded by Charles Kelvynge Greenway
Baronetage of the United Kingdom
New creation	Baronet (of Stanbridge Earls); 1919–1934	Succeeded by Charles Greenway
