= H. W. Gepp =

Australian mining metallurgist

Sir Herbert William Gepp (pron. "Jepp") (28 September 1877 – 14 April 1954) was an Australian industrial chemist, businessman and public servant.

== History ==
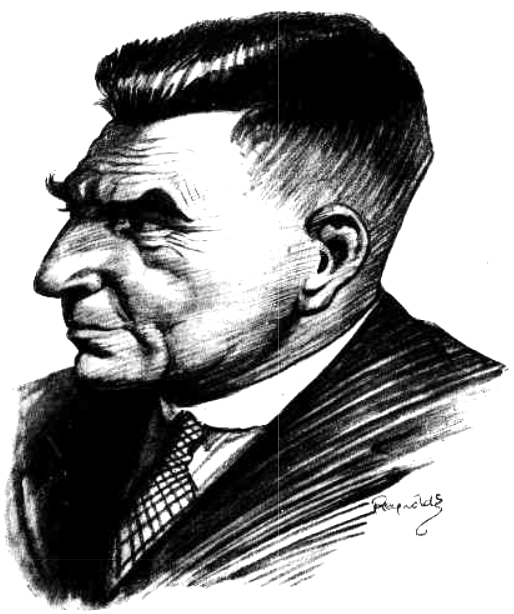
1928 caricature by Reynolds

Gepp was born in Adelaide, a son of William John Gepp (1843 – 27 March 1915) and his wife Marian Gepp, née Rogers (c. 1848 – 11 May 1915).

William was the eldest surviving son of veterinarian Thomas Gepp, sen. (1809–1894), who arrived in South Australia aboard the brig Rapid in August 1836. William's brother Thomas Gepp, jun. (July 1852 – 27 August 1916) was a solicitor who in December 1888 was elected Mayor of Norwood and Kensington.

He was educated at public schools, and won a scholarship to attend Prince Alfred College, but despite a fine academic record and sharing the Longbottom Scholarship in 1893, was unable to proceed to Adelaide University due to straitened family circumstances. He joined the Australian Explosives and Chemical Co., Deer Park, Victoria, as a cadet in 1893, and in 1896 studied chemistry part-time under Professor Masson at Melbourne University. In 1897 the company was taken over by Alfred Nobel's Explosives and Chemical Co. and in 1898, still classified as a junior chemist, Gepp was sent to the new parent company's headquarters in Glasgow for two years, and a few years after his return was promoted to manager of the Melbourne factory.

In 1905, he accepted the position of first manager of the Broken Hill sulphuric acid manufacturing plant which was about to be commissioned for the Zinc Corporation, largely owned by Clark & Robinson and the big London firm of Bewick, Moreing, and Company, then resigned 1907 due to ill-health.

In March 1907, he took over management of the De Bavay Treatment Co., Ltd's zinc concentration plant, and worked on development of the froth flotation process. In 1909 the company became Amalgamated Zinc (De Bavay's) Limited with offices in Melbourne and London.

By 1911 zinc had progressed from the "sulphide problem" to a barely profitable sideline to a major source of income for Broken Hill. There were now five companies producing vast quantities of zinc concentrate by flotation: the Zinc Corporation; Amalgamated Zinc (De Bavay's); the Central mine, the Proprietary, and the British. This was mostly being exported rather than being smelted in Australia due to lack of facilities.

At the outbreak of war in 1914 Gepp led a volunteer rifle company at Broken Hill, and enlisted with the First AIF. He underwent training with the 12th company Field Engineers at Fort Largs. He was however commandeered by Billy Hughes and William Baillieu to encourage the US use of Australian zinc concentrates, and by Andrew Fisher to investigate munitions manufacture.

While in America, Gepp recruited Charles M. Warner of the Dwight-Lloyd Company, suppliers of roasting equipment; Guy C. Riddell of A. S. & R., East Helena, Montana; and Gilbert Rigg of New Jersey Zinc to assist with new zinc works going up at Broken Hill, Port Pirie and Hobart. Under Gepp's direction, Amalgamated Zinc (De Bavay's) founded a subsidiary, Electrolytic Zinc to produce zinc metal in Risdon, Tasmania from Broken Hill and Port Pirie concentrate using the plentiful and cheap hydroelectric power then available. In 1917 he was appointed general manager of the new company, and with support from Baillieu steered the factory through its difficult trial phases. He led the design and construction of a pilot plant, scaled it up to ten tons of 99.95% purity zinc metal per week then a 100-ton plant in 1918. Chief research chemist at the Risdon works was Roland D. Williams, who was with Gepp in Broken Hill.

In 1926, Gepp entered a new phase, as a public servant.

- He was appointed by Prime Minister Bruce chair of the Development and Migration Commission, The commission was disbanded by the Scullin government in 1930 as a money-saving measure: Gepp was kept on with a retainer of £1250 a year, down from £5000.
- In 1929, he was appointed to a Royal Commission reporting into the coal industry
- He was appointed chairman of the Royal Commission on the wheat, flour, and bread industries in 1934
- In 1934, he was appointed director of the North Australian Aerial Geological and Geophysical Survey.
- In 1942, he was put in charge of the Central Cargo Committee set up under National Security regulations to expedite wartime unloading of ships and road transport of goods. He was not only given leave of absence by his employer (APM) but they paid his salary.

In 1931, he became technical consultant to Australian Paper Manufacturers Ltd, and in 1936 was appointed its general manager. He was responsible for development of the Maryvale pulp mill, near Morwell, Victoria, which entered production in 1939; he initiated a housing scheme for its workers. His son Orwell started working for the company during WWII as head of recycling, and stayed on as sales manager.

He retired in 1950, and died suddenly at his farm, aged 76. His remains were buried in the local cemetery.

== Other interests ==
- Gepp was a popular speaker on scientific and societal subjects: miners' health
- In 1913 he founded the Broken Hill Progress Association, whose aim was to improve the town's amenities.
- From 1924 he owned a share farm, "Garden Hill Estate" at Kangaroo Ground, Victoria, where he ran a large herd of dairy cattle, reduced in 1938 and until 1943 he ran a dairy of some 40 cows, then an Aberdeen-Angus cattle stud.

== Recognition and appointments ==
- In 1924, Gepp and Gilbert Rigg were awarded the Gold Medal of the (British) Institute of Mining and Metallurgy, the first Australians so honored, and represented Australia at that body's Empire Congress in London.
- In 1924, Gepp was elected president of the Australasian Institute of Mining and Metallurgy
- In 1924, he served as a commissioner for the British Empire Exhibition at Wembley.
- In 1926, he was appointed chairman of the Commonwealth Development and Migration Commission
- He was knighted in 1933
- In 1950, he was elected chairman of the Australian Chemical Institute

== Family ==
Gepp married Jessie Powell Hilliard at Hawthorn, Victoria on 5 July 1905. Their family included:

- Orwell Hilliard Gepp (July 1906 – ) married Marjory Jean Broad ( – ) on 1 October 1930. He was an agronomist and for a time breeder of Blonde d'Aquitaine cattle.
- Kathleen Jessie Gepp (5 January 1908 – ) social editor with The Age, appointed director of Junior Red Cross, Geneva in 1949
- Dr. Dorothy Marian Gepp (perhaps 1909 – 2004) married Dr. Alexander John Maum Sinclair (6 November 1908 – 7 October 1989) on 15 March 1937. He served with the Royal Flying Doctor Service, became a noted psychiatrist.
- Constance Crawford Gepp (1911 – ) married Curtis Wilson, formerly A.D.C. to General Lavarack, on 22 August 1944. She was a financial journalist, then London-based social reporter for Newcastle Morning Herald and Miners' Advocate
- Margaret Helen "Mardi" Gepp (1920 – 2005) married Squadron-Leader Richard Gething, A.F.C., Royal Air Force in Canada on 11 May 1940. She was a pilot with ATA, ferrying planes during WWII.

They had a home "Strathalan" in Macleod, Victoria, later on Hampden road, Armadale, Victoria

== Bibliography ==
- Gepp, H. W., as told to Alan Moyle, I look at life through a question mark : a retrospect and a challenge, The Sun News-Pictorial, Melbourne 1936
- Gepp, H. W. Democracy's danger : addresses on various occasions, Angus & Robertson, Sydney 1939
- Gepp, H. W. When Peace Comes, Robertson & Mullens, Melbourne 1943
- Gepp, H. W. The changing factors in industrial human relations, Institute of Industrial Management, Sydney 1946
