= Laurence Brodie-Hall =

Australian businessman (1910–2006)

Sir Laurence Brodie-Hall AO CMG HonFAusIMM
- Born: Laurence Charles Brodie-Hall; 10 June 1910; London, United Kingdom
- Died: 1 October 2006 (aged 96)
- Education: Kalgoorlie School of Mines
- Occupations: Entrepreneur; business executive; company director
- Spouse: Lady Jean Brodie-Hall
- Awards: Officer of the Order of Australia; Honorary Fellow of the Australasian Institute of Mining and Metallurgy

Sir Laurence Charles Brodie-Hall (10 June 1910 – 1 October 2006) was an influential figure in the mining industry of Western Australia (WA).

== Early life ==
Brodie-Hall was born in London and emigrated to Australia in 1924, leaving his parents. He worked as a farm hand in New South Wales and moved to WA in 1927. He co-bought a garage business but went broke during the Great Depression.

== Early mining career ==
He was an underground gold miner in WA's Murchison. In 1934 he joined Western Mining Corporation's Triton mine near Cue as a machine miner. Next he went to Kalgoorlie, took a shift job at the Kalgurli Ore Treatment Company's plant and began a part-time course at the WA School of Mines. On the goldfields he played the violin, sang and was involved in amateur theatricals. In 1939 he worked at the Emperor Mine in Fiji. When World War II started he returned to WA and worked as plant superintendent on Claude de Bernales' Baileys Mine at Coolgardie. When Japan entered the war in 1941 Brodie-Hall enlisted as a sapper in the Royal Australian Engineers. By the end of the war he was a captain. He returned to Kalgoorlie after demobilisation and completed mining and metallurgy degrees at the WA School of Mines under the Commonwealth Rehabilitation Scheme. In 1948 WMC's managing director, (Sir) Lindesay Clark, offered him a job as junior mine geologist at Norseman. He was soon transferred to Melbourne as technical assistant to Sir Lindesay.

== Management and later career ==
In 1951, Brodie-Hall was appointed General Superintendent of Great Western Consolidated. For the next seven years he worked at Bullfinch where he established a reputation for technical innovation and good management. A combination of high inflation and below-expected grades resulted in a financial disaster for the company. In 1958 he was promoted to WMC's General Superintendent in WA, and in 1962 he became an executive director. He was involved in the Geraldton Iron Ore Joint Venture, which led to Australia's first shipment of iron ore under long-term contract to Japan in March 1966. It was due to his encouragement and support that WMC discovered nickel sulphides at Kambalda in January 1966. The rapid establishment of Kambalda Nickel Operations in 1967, the Kwinana Nickel Refinery in 1970 and the Kalgoorlie Nickel Smelter in 1972 were among his major achievements.

After moving to Perth in 1967 he increasingly involved himself in industry and community affairs. He was President of the WA Chamber of Mines from 1970 to 1974, a member of the Australian Mining Industry Council and President of the Australasian Institute of Mining and Metallurgy in 1973 as well as being made an honorary fellow in 1988 of the AusIMM. Government and advisory body service included the WA Environmental Protection Council, the CSIRO Council and Chairman of the State Committee of CSIRO. He received the Western Australian Citizen of the Year Award in 1974, was made a Companion of the Order of St Michael and St George (CMG) in 1976, created a Knight Bachelor in the 1982 Birthday Honours, and was made a Freeman of the City of Kalgoorlie-Boulder in 1989. He was a director of Ansett Australia. He was appointed an Officer of the Order of Australia (AO) in the Australia Day Honours in 1993 in recognition of his contribution to the Australian mining industry.

== Later years ==
After retiring as an executive director of WMC in 1975, Brodie-Hall kept his position on boards of WMC and Alcoa Australia for seven years. He was chairman of Kalgoorlie Lake View Pty Ltd, Kalgoorlie Mining Associates, Central Norseman Gold Corporation NL, and Three Springs Talc until 1982 and Gold Mines of Kalgoorlie Ltd until 1985. He was chairman of Westerntech Innovations Corp and Energy Research Group, and a director of Coolgardie Gold NL and a number of non-listed enterprises.

For many years he maintained a keen interest in the WA School of Mines and was chairman of the School's board of management for a long period. He served on the Council of the Western Australian Institute of Technology (WAIT, which became Curtin University) and received an Honorary Doctorate of Technology from WAIT in 1978. He was appointed a Fellow of Curtin University for his service to tertiary education in Western Australia. His name is commemorated in the L C Brodie-Hall Administration Centre at Agricola College, Kalgoorlie, the Brodie-Hall Research and Consultancy Centre at Curtin University and Brodie-Hall Drive at Technology Park. In 1994 he published his memoirs". He died in October 2006.

== Family ==
Brodie-Hall married Dorothy Jolly. Dorothy supported Brodie-Hall and their young family while he was studying geology at the Kalgoorlie School of mines. They had five children. After her death he married Jean Verschuer.
