= Jean Brodie-Hall =

Australian architect (1925–2023)

Jean, Lady Brodie-Hall, AM, FAILA (15 August 1925 – July 2023) was an Australian landscape architect. She was a founding member of the Australian Institute of Landscape Architects, and had a long and distinguished career in Western Australia before her retirement in 1981. She was acknowledged as a leader in West Australian landscape architecture and received a national award for landscape architecture in 1990.

== Early life ==
Jean Estelle Slatyer was born in Rockhampton, Queensland, Australia on 15 August 1925, daughter of Thomas Henry Slatyer and his wife Jean Estelle MacKenzie. She was the middle one of five siblings, having two older and two younger brothers.

Brodie-Hall studied nursing at the Children's Hospital (now Princess Margaret Hospital), working in London and Melbourne, before settling back in Perth with her family in the late 1940s. After marrying dentist Ivan Barnes Verschuer in 1951, she enrolled in a horticultural course at Perth Technical College, balancing caring for their three young children.

== Professional career ==
Brodie-Hall was a founding member of the Australian Institute of Landscape Architects (AILA) and served on the Institute's federal council for 10 years, during which time she was also the Australian delegate to the International Federation of Landscape Architects (IFLA). For the last two years of her term, she was President of the AILA.

During the 1960s, Brodie-Hall's early projects were through the architecture firms of Forbes & Fitzhardinge and Summerhayes & Associates, where she was a consultant to large public companies, private firms, government agencies and local councils on a range of projects. These included standard-gauge railway stations, the Salvation Army village in Hollywood, Western Australia, and the design of major mining towns and their surrounds.

Following the incorporation of the AILA and her admission as a founding member, Brodie-Hall opened a private practice in Kalamunda, Western Australia. She worked extensively for the Western Mining Corporation on their Kambalda project, at the Kwinana Nickel Refinery, the Kalgoorlie Nickel Smelter and the Agricola College for the School of Mines.

In 1970, Brodie-Hall was engaged by the University of Western Australia (UWA), initially to report on the changes to pedestrian and vehicle movement caused by the recently completed underpass from the north of the campus. On the retirement of the curator, she was appointed the inaugural University Landscape Architect in 1974, responsible for planning, design and maintenance of the campus, in the office of the University Architect until her retirement in 1981. She was responsible for the improvement of Whitfeld Court, the Sunken Garden, Somerville Auditorium, the Great Court, the Tropical Grove, the Oak Lawn, Jackson Court, Prescott Court and Whelan Court.

== Personal life ==
Jean Slatyer married Ivan Barnes Verschuer in 1951. In 1980 she remarried, as his second wife, Sir Laurence Brodie-Hall, becoming Lady Brodie-Hall upon his knighthood in 1982.

== Death ==
Jean Brodie-Hall died in July 2023, at the age of 97.

== Awards and recognition ==
In 1979, Brodie-Hall became a Fellow of the AILWA and was awarded the AILA Award in Landscape Architecture in 1990. She was appointed a Member of the Order of Australia (AM) for services to conservation and the environment in the 2001 Australia Day Honours, and received the Centenary Medal in the same year.

Jean Brodie-Hall maintained strong connections with UWA, helping to establish the UWA Friends of the Grounds, becoming Patron of the UWA Centenary Trust for Women, The Kwongan Foundation for the conservation of Australia's biodiversity, as well as serving on numerous committees.

=== List of awards ===
- 1980, Fellow of the Australian Institute of Landscape Architects
- 1981, Fellow of Curtin University
- 1990, Awarded the Medal of the Institute of Landscape Architects
- 2001, Centenary Medal
- 2001, Member of the Order of Australia
- 2004, Chancellors Medal UWA

== External links and further reading ==
20 women of landscape architecture, short film, 2014

1984, English, Video edition: Landscape architecture in Western Australia [videorecording] : founder figures : special guest, Jean Verschuer.

Freestone, Robert (2010) Urban Nation: Australia's Planning Heritage. CSIRO Publishing

Saniga, Andrew (2012) Making Landscape Architecture in Australia. UNSW Press
