= Alexander Montgomery (geologist) =

Alexander Montgomery MA (January 1862 – 10 February 1933) was a geologist who held important Government positions in New Zealand, Tasmania and Western Australia.

== History ==
Montgomery was born at Morningside, Edinburgh, the second son of Alexander Montgomery, previously headmaster of the George Street Normal School, Dunedin, New Zealand. The family travelled to New Zealand in 1865, and Montgomery was educated at the Otago Boys' High School and Otago University School of Mines. He qualified BA at New Zealand University in 1881, and MA with first class honors in chemistry and electricity in 1882, and acted as assistant to James Gow Black, professor of chemistry and metallurgy, in 1881 and 1882. He studied geology at the Otago School of Mines under Professor G. H. F. Ulrich in 1882 and 1883.

In late 1883 he joined the New Zealand Public Works Department, under W. N. Blair, CE. From 1883 to 1885 Montgomery was occupied in construction of the East and West Coast Railways and the Otago Central Railway. At the end of 1885 he was transferred to the New Zealand Mines Department, and assisted Professor Black in the establishment of schools of mines in various New Zealand mining towns, and from 1886 to 1889 was in charge of the Thames School of Mines in the Hauraki gold field.

In 1889 he was appointed by the Tasmanian Government as Inspector of Mines and Geological Surveyor, at a time of intense mine development. During this time he exposed the "Mount Hoaxley" swindle, but its perpetrators, though known, were through lack of evidence never convicted.

At the end of 1896 he was appointed superintending engineer to Kauri Gold Estates, Limited, who were developing their large freehold property on the Hauraki Peninsula.

In August 1902 he was appointed Western Australian Government State mining engineer.

Montgomery retired in 1930. He died suddenly at Mount Lawley, Western Australia three years later.

== Memberships ==
- Life member of the American Institute of Mining Engineers
- Active member of the Australasian Institute of Mining Engineers from its foundation, and its president in 1895
- Member, North of England Institute of Mining and Mechanical Engineers
- Member, Federated Institute of Mining Engineers
- Fellow of the Geological Society of London
- Member, Australasian Association for the Advancement of Science and twice acted as vice-president of Section C (Geology)
- Member, Geological Society of Australasia
- Member, New Zealand Institute
- Member, Chamber of Mines of Victoria.
