= 1975 Queen's Birthday Honours (Australia) =

Annual honours in Australia

The Queen's Birthday Honours 1975 for Australia were appointments to recognise and reward good works by citizens of Australia and other nations that contribute to Australia. The Birthday Honours are awarded as part of the Queen's Official Birthday celebrations and were announced on 14 June 1975 in Australia. It was the inaugural list of the Order of Australia.

The recipients of honours are displayed as they were styled before their new honour and arranged by honour with grades and then divisions i.e. Civil, Diplomatic and Military as appropriate.

† indicates an award given posthumously.

== Order of Australia ==
=== Companion (AC) ===
==== General Division ====
- Charles Manning Hope Clark
- Sir Gordon Colvin Lindesay Clark, KBE, CMG, MC
- Herbert Cole Coombs
- The Hon. Eric Elliott Reece
- Joan Alston Sutherland, CBE
- Patrick Victor Martindale White

==== Military Division ====
===== Navy =====
- Admiral Sir Victor Alfred Trumper Smith, KBE, CB, DSC

===== Army =====
- Lieutenant General Francis George Hassett, CB, CBE, DSO, MVO

=== Officer (AO) ===
==== General Division ====
- Geoffrey Malcolm Badger
- Giacomo Alberto Bayutti
- Geoffrey Norman Blainey
- Allan George Gibbs
- Byron Arthur Kakulas
- Phillip Garth Law, CBE
- Allan George Moyes
- David Horace Forde Scott

==== Military Division ====
===== Navy =====
- Rear Admiral Geoffrey Vernon Gladstone, DSC

===== Army =====
- Major General Stuart Clarence Graham, DSO, OBE, MC
- Major General Cedric Maudsley Ingram Pearson, DSO, OBE, MC
- Major General Alan Bishop Stretton, CBE

===== Air Force =====
- Air Vice Marshal Geoffrey Thompson Newstead, CBE

=== Member (AM) ===
==== General Division ====
- Irene Constance Alexander
- Stanley Foch Arneil
- Alfred Richard Baring
- Phyllis Eva Bonython
- Henry Edward Boord
- Elizabeth Bryan
- Eric Elwin Samuel Clayton
- Doris Catherine Condon
- Joyce Cummings
- Herbert John Dillon
- Athel D'Ombrain
- Henry Arthur James Donegan
- Ernst Bert Gilbert
- James Timothy Gleeson
- Phyllis Mervyne Gration
- Irene Adelaide Greenwood
- William Herbert Hayes
- Kevin Heinz
- Charles Dennison King
- Alfred Morris Kingston
- Keith Langford-Smith
- Louis Fleming Leake
- Peter Leon Lehmann
- Ida Victoria Lowndes
- Elwin Augustus Lynn
- James Phillip McAuley
- Ernst Joseph McDermott
- Thomas Osborne McGee
- David Henry McHugo
- David Henry McKenzie
- Ronald John Martin
- John Stuart Maslin
- Hilda Mary Morieson
- George Rowland Mountain
- Richard William Murden
- Ralph John Naughton
- Frank Austin Pallin
- William Herbert Perkins
- Graham Martin Pizzey
- Thomas Dudley Room
- Harold Noel Roscrow
- Dorothea Sharks
- Maurice John Shapiro
- Marjorie Smart
- Ernst Smith
- Keith Thomas Smith
- Harold James Souter
- Graham Selwyn Stephenson
- Kenneth Wilberforce Tribe
- Reginald Nelson Walker
- Muriel Mary Weir
- Margaret Eileen Wilkinson
- Catherine Mary Wilson

==== Military Division ====
===== Navy =====
- Captain Charles Ivan Faherty, ADC, RD, RANR
- Captain Eric Eugene Johnston, OBE, RAN
- Acting Captain Barbara Denis Macleod, WRANS
- Lieutenant Commander James Anthony Failey, RAN
- Warrant Officer Quartermaster Gunner Derek Berry
- Warrant Officer Engine Room Artificer Robert John Cox
- Warrant Officer Radio Supervisor Reginald Edwin Foden
- Warrant Officer Underwater Control Reginald Paul Jacobs
- Chief Petty Officer Quartermaster Gunner Alan George Meyer

===== Army =====
- Colonel Catherine Mary Fowler
- Colonel Kevin Donal Whiting, ED
- Major Thelma Beryl Crough, ED
- Major James Messini
- Captain Peter James Bayliss
- Captain Trevor Christopher Bayo
- Captain Stanley Earle Jennings
- Captain Neville John Opie
- Warrant Officer Class One Brian Bede Agnew
- Warrant Officer Class One Patrick David Buckley
- Warrant Officer Class One Clement Kealey
- Warrant Officer Class Two Maximilian Erich Halbreiner
- Sergeant Patrick David Griffin
- Sergeant Michael George Holloway
- Sergeant Adrian Sherriff
- Sergeant Leonard Birkett Waddington
- Corporal Rose Mary Finn

===== Air Force =====
- Air Commodore James Hilary Flemming
- Air Commodore Arthur Henry Pickering
- Group Captain David Wilson Hitchins
- Wing Commander William Darcy John Monaghan
- Flight Lieutenant Aubury Alfred Quirk
- Warrant Officer Frederick William Huntley
- Warrant Officer Patrick Henry Reinhart
- Flight Sergeant Jusuf John Khan

===== Other =====
- Group Officer Dawn Desire Parsloe
