= T. J. Greenway =

English metallurgist and mining manager in Australia

Thomas John Greenway FIC (1854 – 12 March 1946) was an English metallurgist and mining manager in Australia, closely associated with the development of the Broken Hill mines.

== History ==
Greenway was born in 1854, the son of John David Greenway (1823–1889) of Taunton, Somerset, and his wife, Emily.

While employed as chief smelter by the Sheffield Smelting Company he was recruited as metallurgist for the Block 14 Company, Broken Hill, whose manager was S. R. Wilson, and arrived in Adelaide in January 1888. His one-year contract was not renewed, and the position was given to a Mr. Schlapp

By 1889, Greenway was working as manager of the British Broken Hill Proprietary Company's Port Pirie smelting works, which consisted of five 80-ton furnaces, taken over in 1895 by the BHP company to complement their refinery works, erected in 1889. Greenway was succeeded at Port Pirie by Gregory Board.

In 1893, he was manager of the Junction Silver Mining Company's works at Port Adelaide. In 1896, he was appointed consulting engineer of the Broken Hill South mine. He was, like mining Captains Hancock and Warren, engrossed with the "sulphide problem". Much of the silver and lead ore was easy to reduce to the metal by smelting, and it was this ore which gave Broken Hill its first great profits. By contrast, the zinc ore was mostly in the form of sulphides, not readily reduced by the smelters at Broken Hill and Port Pirie so treated as waste, forming great hills around the treatment plants. It could be made profitable if the sulphides could be separated from non-economic material such as silica. The concentrated ore could then be loaded onto ships and sent to Europe for processing. Many processes were available (magnetic separation, froth flotation, vanning, jigging), most using water and agitation after pulverizing, to separate the metal sulphide from the lighter weight gangue, but none gave perfect separation, and each had to be optimized for the particular ore body.

Greenway was appointed to the South Australian School of Mines in 1898, as a replacement for Adam Adamson, who had recently died.

In 1899, Greenway was with the Block 14 Company, Broken Hill, and at the same time, controversially, consulting engineer to the Broken Hill South mine, which he resigned in February 1900, to be replaced by Frederick Charles Howard (c. 1856–1919). He was around the same time appointed consulting engineer of the Sliding Rock mine, Beltana.

On 30 January 1902, Greenway, by then manager of the Block 14 smelting works at Port Adelaide, was driving a trap along the Ocean Steamers Wharf Road to the Block 14 company's smelting works at Port Adelaide with an assistant named Joseph Winter, when at a bend they were "bailed up" by a pair of masked highway robbers, one of whom had a revolver with which he shot dead the pony; they made off with the company payroll of over £1200. Alfred Lawson and Myles Flynn were charged with the offence, found guilty and sentenced to twenty years' jail. Lawson admitted his guilt but insisted Flynn had nothing to do with the crime. Flynn, who had become overwrought, was consigned to the criminal ward of the Parkside Lunatic Asylum.

In June 1902, Greenway was associated with the Stannary Hills mine in Queensland. He was appointed general manager of the Chillagoe Railway & Mining Co. in June 1902 and resigned in 1906.

Greenway settled in Melbourne, and became manager of the Potter Sulphide Ore Treatment Company in 1909.

In Victoria, Greenway was prominent in urging the Peacock and Bowser Ministries (1914–1918) to develop brown coal extraction in Gippsland.

In 1917, described as a Melbourne mining engineer, he visited Petrograd, similarly described in 1919.

In 1924, Greenway was appointed chairman of directors of Commonwealth Oil Refineries Ltd, and was succeeded in 1926 by Major W. L. W. Bird. In May 1925, Greenway left Australia for Canada.

== Death ==
Greenway died in Langley Prairie, British Columbia.

== Inventions ==
- In February 1918 he secured a patent for a "means of destroying prickly pear and other pest vegetation".
- He also made patent applications for various modifications to well-known ore separation techniques.

== Other interests ==
Greenway was a member of Adelaide's Lyric Club.

== Family ==
Greenway was married. Mrs Greenway was in 1924 president of St. Martin's Boys' Home, Auburn, auxiliary at St Kilda. They had at least two children:

- Eleanor Greenway, their only daughter, was also involved with the Boys' Home charity. She married Fred G. Claudet of Nanoose Bay, Vancouver Island on 3 June 1924 Frederick was a grandson of pioneer photographer Antoine Claudet (1797–1867).
- Harold Greenway (c. January 1887 – 9 April 1950), born in Sheffield, was a student at St Peter's College (1899–1902), and Adelaide University, gaining his BSc in 1906 and getting mining experience in Broken Hill, at Upper Bingara, New South Wales and at Eaglehawk, Victoria before in November 1910 taking the managership of the Great Chaffinch mine, Western Australia, which became notorious as a fraud. He married Constance Tarlton Phillipps, a daughter of Herbert Phillipps, on 2 January 1917. As Maj. Greenway, he was decorated in the Great War and died in 1950 as Col. Greenway DSO, Croix de Guerre. He was associated with Persian Oil, then with coal mining in the Abermain Seaham Collieries Ltd. and the J. & A. Brown coal companies.

Sir Charles Greenway, Bart. (1857–1934), chairman of the Anglo-Persian Oil Company has been several times named as his brother. (This conflicts with an assertion by the Oxford Dictionary of National Biography that Sir Charles was an only son).

Possibly related

- Thomas Charles Greenway, relationship if any not found, was a student at St Peter's College 1892–1895 or later, followed by the School of Mines, where he was awarded a Diploma in Metallurgy and Mining in 1902. He worked as chief assayer at the Broken Hill North mine 1904–1906. He sailed for Gibraltar in April 1906, having secured a position in Spain.
- H(enry) Howard Greenway qualified as an engineer in 1880, worked for the Indian Forest Service, was analyst for Colonial Sugar Refiners 1883–1889, manager in New Zealand for the Cassel Gold Extraction Company 1889–1903, general manager for the Australian Gold-Recovery Company in 1898. He was brought out from England by the Potter's Sulphide Process Company in 1905. While manager in Australia for Minerals Separation Limited he lodged patents for improved ore concentration. No relationship has yet been discovered, and the fact of two men having the same surname managing rival companies was remarked upon in the press as a curious coincidence, not as a family matter.
