= Lindesay Clark =

Australian mining engineer and executive (1896–1986)

Sir Lindesay Clark AC KBE CMG MC FTSE FAusIMM
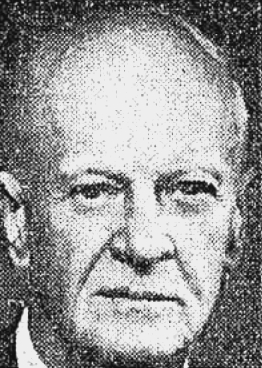
- Lindesay Clark, c.1968

Personal details
- Born: Gordon Colvin Lindesay Clark; 7 January 1896 South Melbourne, Victoria, Australia
- Died: 3 January 1986 (aged 89) Kooyong, Victoria, Australia
- Education: Launceston Church Grammar School
- Alma mater: University of Tasmania; University of Melbourne
- Occupation: Chemical engineer; company director; metallurgist

Military service
- Allegiance: Australia
- Branch/service: Australian Army
- Years of service: 1916–1919
- Rank: Lieutenant
- Battles/wars: World War I; Western Front; Battle of Ypres

Sir Gordon Colvin Lindesay Clark (7 January 1896 – 3 January 1986) was an Australian mining engineer and company director. He had a profound influence on the metallurgical industry in Australia and on the attitudes of many of its later leaders. He was instrumental in transforming Western Mining Corporation from a small gold miner into a diversified giant.

== Early life ==
Lindesay Clark was born in South Melbourne in 1896, the eldest of six children. He spent his childhood in Tasmania, where his father was a mining engineer for the Mount Lyell Mining & Railway Company. He had a governess until age 12, but attended secondary school in Launceston. He gained a Bachelor of Science from the University of Tasmania in 1916.

== Career ==
During World War I, he served on the Western Front as an engineer, rising to the rank of lieutenant (he was commissioned in the field at Ypres). He was awarded the Military Cross (MC) in 1919. On returning to Australia, he went back to study engineering at the University of Melbourne, entering residence at Trinity College in 1919, where he played in the College cricket team. He gained a Masters of Mechanical Engineering from the university in 1923. In 1922, he went to work with his father, who was then a consulting engineer for the State Electricity Commission of Victoria, which was developing the Yallourn coal deposits for electricity generation, under the leadership of Sir John Monash.

He lectured at the University of Melbourne and established his own consultancy, doing mining engineering work in Central Australia, Queensland and New Guinea. He went to work for Gold Mines of Australia Ltd in 1930, beginning a 48-year association with that company. He became manager in 1931, and technical managing director of Western Mining Corporation (WMC) in 1933, holding that position until 1962.

During World War II, he was engaged by the federal government as Deputy Controller of Minerals Production. This resulted in ventures such as extracting scheelite from King Island. He joined the boards of various BHP-controlled companies and directed the expansion of WMC's operations in Western Australia and Victoria. He became Chairman of WMC in 1952, retiring in 1974. The bauxite deposits in the Darling Range (WA) were proven under his watch. He became chairman of Alcoa Australia on its foundation in 1961, and his efforts led to the creation of the integrated aluminium industry in Australia. He was involved in the first exports of iron ore to Japan, the discovery of nickel and the development of a nickel industry, and the discovery of uranium deposits at Roxby Downs in South Australia.

Clark was president, fellow or member of a number of organisations, including the Australian Mines and Metals Association, the chambers of Mines of Western Australia and Victoria, the Australian Mineral Industries Research Association (AMIRA), the Australian Mining Industry Council, the Australian Academy of Technological Sciences (FTSE) (Foundation Fellow 1975), the Australasian Institute of Mining & Metallurgy (FAusIMM), and the Institution of Mining and Metallurgy (London).

== Personal life ==
In 1922, he married Barbara Walch. A son, Arthur, was a foundation professor in pediatrics at Monash University.

== Honours ==
He was awarded an honorary Doctorate of Engineering and the W. C. Kernot Medal by the University of Melbourne, and an honorary Doctorate of Laws from Monash University.

In 1961 he was appointed a Companion of the Order of St Michael and St George (CMG), recognising his role as President of the Australian Institute of Mining. In recognition of service to the mining industry, he was knighted as a Knight Commander of the Order of the British Empire (KBE) in the New Years Honours of 1968. He was appointed a Companion of the Order of Australia (AC) in the 1975 Queen's Birthday Honours, the first regular awards made after the order's creation in February 1975. The citation read "For eminent achievement and merit of the highest degree in the development of the Australian mining industry".

In 1973 Clifton Pugh painted his portrait, currently held by Alcoa. In 1979 the WMC-Lindesay Clark Trust Fund was established to benefit communities in areas where WMC operates.

In 1983 he wrote Built on Gold: Recollections of Western Mining (1983). Sir Lindesay Clark died on 3 January 1986 in Kooyong, four days before his 90th birthday, survived by his wife and their two daughters and son. His son is Professor Arthur Colvin Lindesay Clark AM, foundation Professor of Paediatrics at Monash University.

The giant "Lindesay Clark Window" is on the western wall of the Robert Blackwood Hall at Monash University. It was created by Leonard French in honour of Clark, who was a generous benefactor to the university.

== Sources ==
- Technology in Australia 1788–1988: Sir Lindesay Clark, An Appreciation
- Sydney Morning Herald, Obituary, 8 January 1986
- Australian Dictionary of Biography
- The Age, 8 Jan 1986: Sir Lindesay Clark, Pioneer and Optimist
- Australian Prospectors and Miners Hall of Fame
