= F. Danvers Power =

Australian academic

- Born: 1861
- Died: 1955 (aged 93–94)
- Occupation: Geologist

Frederick Danvers Power (1861–1955) was an Australian academic, a lecturer in geology and metallurgy.

== History ==
Power was born in England, a son of Samuel Browning Power (1824–1892), a shipowner of London, and his wife Rebecca Danvers (1835–1902).

He was educated at Malvern College, the Royal School of Mines, London, and the Mining Academy, Clausthal, Germany.

In 1884 he migrated to Australia, settling in Melbourne. He worked in an assay laboratory in Bethanga until 1887,

While an assayer for the Union Bank, he was in 1890 a key witness in the trial of Robert J. W. Pound, accused of the theft of some £5,000 worth of platinum from the Otway Ranges Company.

He was appointed consulting engineer to tho Overflow Company in 1897.

In 1902 he was appointed lecturer in mining at Sydney University, which he held until 1935.

Power acted as manager of the Great Cobar mine in 1913 during the four months Bellinger was away on leave.

== Memberships ==
- He was a longtime member of Australasian Institute of Mining Engineers, and president 1897, 1904.
- Fellow of the Geological Society
- Member of the American Institute of Mining Engineers
- Member of the Institute of Mining and Metallurgy in London

== Bibliography ==
- The Pambula gold-deposits (1893)
- A glossary of terms used in mining geology (1895)
- Receptacles for valuable mineral deposits AIMM (1897)
- Mine management Sydney University Press (1906)
- Coalfields and Collieries of Australia (1912)
- Pocketbook for Miners and Metallurgists (1914)

== Other interests ==
- He formed his own publishing company Rhincru Press and published various technical and non-fiction books
- Power was a Scout Leader, and Assistant Commissioner; he wrote the Australian Boy Scouts Handbook
- He was an excellent photographer and many of his glass plate Sydney street scenes are held in public collections.
- He was an inveterate world traveller; many of the artefacts he picked up (especially from islands such as Nauru and Banaba, where phosphate rock was being mined) he donated to the Australian Museum.

== Family ==
Power married Muriel Faucett Blain (29 Aug 1876 – 22 Jan 1951) on 28 November 1901 among their children were:

- Charles Danvers Power (10 March 1903 – 7 August 1995)
- Robert Danvers "Bob" Power (21 April 1907 – 27 June 1997)
