= Beryl Elaine Jacka =

Australian mining secretary and executive (1913–1989)

Beryl Jacka AM MBE
- Born: Beryl Elaine Jacka; 9 June 1913; Hawthorn, Victoria, Australia
- Died: 27 December 1989 (aged 76); Glen Iris, Victoria, Australia
- Known for: Executive Officer for the ATSE

Beryl Elaine Jacka AM MBE (9 June 1913 – 27 December 1989) was a private secretary for the Australasian Institute of Mining and Metallurgy (AUSIMM) (1948–1976), the inaugural secretary of the Australian Minerals Industry Research Association (AMIRA) (1959–1975) and executive officer at Australian Academy of Technological Sciences (ATSE) (1976–1989). The Beryl Jacka Award was founded in her honour.

Beryl Jacka joined the AusIMM as a typist in 1936 and became acting secretary in 1945. She was officially appointed secretary in 1948 and over the next 28 years she played a vital role in the Institute's growth from 1200 members in 14 branches to 6500 in 35 branches.

Jacka regularly visited Institute branches and attended international congresses. In her role as secretary, she reported to the AusIMM Council — the precursor to the modern AusIMM Board — and was frequently consulted by Institute presidents on matters of policy and procedure.

On her retirement in 1976, AusIMM President C H Martin praised 'the concentration, the search for perfection, and the originality of ideas which characterise Miss Jacka's services' in awarding her honorary membership of the Institute – a remarkable tribute in a then male-dominated profession.

The Institute's 'Beryl Jacka Award' was established in 1993 to recognise members who, like Beryl, 'demonstrated extraordinary and sustained service to the AusIMM.'

Jacka was honoured for her work in the mining industry in both 1965 and 1979 with the Member of the Order of the British Empire (MBE) and a Member of the Order of Australia (AM) respectively.
