= Ambrose Greenway, 4th Baron Greenway =

British marine photographer (born 1941)

The Right Honourable The Lord Greenway
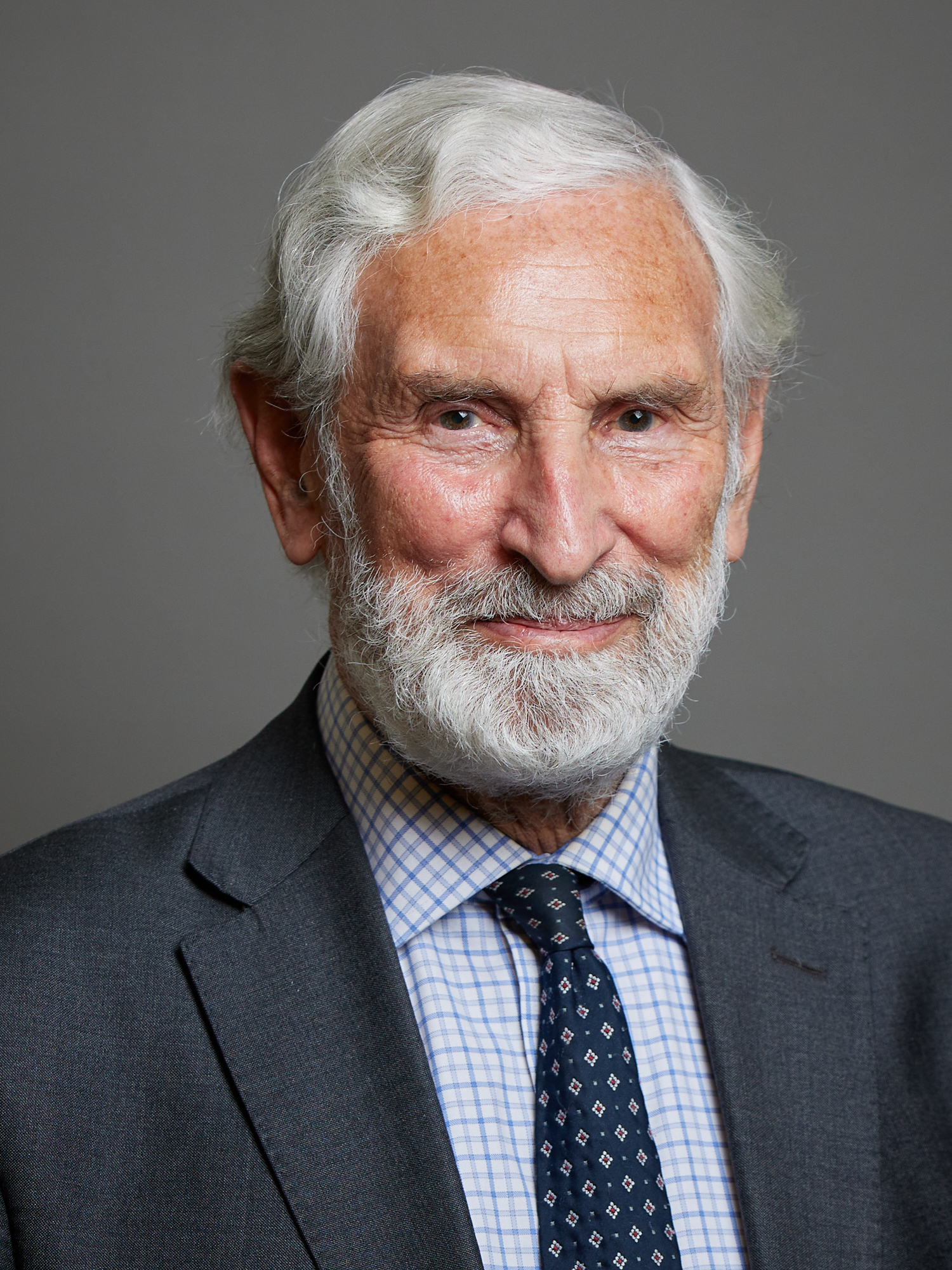

Member of the House of Lords
- Lord Temporal
- Hereditary peerage 8 October 1975 – 11 November 1999
- Preceded by: The 3rd Baron Greenway
- Succeeded by: Seat abolished
- Elected Hereditary Peer; 11 November 1999 – 29 April 2026
- Election: 1999
- Preceded by: Seat established
- Succeeded by: Seat abolished

Personal details
- Born: Ambrose Charles Drexel Greenway; 21 May 1941 (age 85)
- Spouse: Rosalynne Peta Fradgley (m. 1985)
- Education: Winchester College
- Occupation: marine photographer, shipping consultant

Ambrose Charles Drexel Greenway, 4th Baron Greenway (born 21 May 1941), is a British marine photographer and shipping consultant. He was one of the ninety hereditary peers elected to remain in the House of Lords after the passing of the House of Lords Act 1999, where he sat as a crossbencher.

The son of the 3rd Baron Greenway, he was educated at Winchester College. In 1975, Greenway succeeded to his father's titles and in 1987, he was a younger brother of Trinity House. From 1994 to 2000, he was chairman of The Marine Society and from 1995 to 2004 Vice-President of the Sail Training Association. Between 2003 and 2017 he was also chairman of The World Ship Trust.

In 2008, he was Commodore of the House of Lords Yacht Club.

Since 1985, he has been married to Rosalynne Peta Fradgley.

Coat of arms of Ambrose Greenway, 4th Baron Greenway
Crest A griffin’s head Or erased Gules holding in the beak an anchor Sable. Escutcheon Per pale Ermine and Ermines on a chief Azure a crescent between two covered cups Or. Supporters On either side a griffin Sable beak and claws Or holding in the beak an anchor and charged on the shoulder with a covered cup Gold. Motto Labore Et Honore (Industry And Honour)

== Works ==
- Soviet Merchant Ships (1976) ISBN 978-0-91137833-7
- Comecon Merchant Ships (1978) ISBN 978-0-85937349-4
- A Century of Cross-Channel Passenger Ferries (1981) ISBN 978-0-71101069-7
- All at Sea (1982) ISBN 978-0-85937289-3
- A Century of North Sea Passenger Steamers (1986) ISBN 978-0-71101338-4
- Cargo Liners: An Illustrated History (2009) ISBN 978-1-84832006-2
- Cross Channel and Short Sea Ferries: An Illustrated History (2014) ISBN 978-1-84832170-0

Peerage of the United Kingdom
Preceded by Charles Greenway	Baron Greenway; 1975–present Member of the House of Lords (1975–1999)	Incumbent; Heir presumptive: Nicholas Greenway
Parliament of the United Kingdom
New office created by the House of Lords Act 1999	Elected hereditary peer to the House of Lords under the House of Lords Act 1999; 1999–2026	Office abolished under the House of Lords (Hereditary Peers) Act 2026
