= A. S. Kenyon =

Australian civil engineer and polymath

Alfred Stephen Kenyon (7 December 1867 – 14 May 1943), generally known as A. S. Kenyon or Stephen Kenyon was an Australian civil engineer and polymath.

== History ==
Kenyon was born in Homebush, Victoria, the third son of Alfred Henderson Kenyon (c. 1837 – 15 September 1921) and his wife Agnes Fleming Kenyon, née Agnew ( – 10 December 1919). Kenyon's father started in Australia as a farmer in the Wimmera district, later a bookseller and dealer in artists' materials, chess enthusiast and amateur historian

Kenyon was home-schooled for his early education. Then in 1881 the family moved to Highett Street, Richmond, and he enrolled at nearby St Stephen's Grammar School, and in 1884 he entered Ormond College, Melbourne University, to study civil engineering. He joined the Victorian Public Works Department in 1887, and the following year was appointed to the Victorian Water Supply Department, where he was responsible for water supply works in the northern Mallee regions.

Later he was engineer-in-charge in the opening up of the Middle Mallee, organising the water supply for North Mallee, and, later The Great War, of clearing the Red Cliffs irrigation area for repatriation of returned soldiers. He also supervised the construction of other works, including the Goulburn levees and works at Koo-Wee-Rup, Cardinia, Tresco, Mystic Park, Merbein, and Nyah. In 1932 Kenyon was appointed a commissioner of the Victorian Water Supply Commission.

He acted as part-time curator of the Coin Room in the Melbourne Public Library until his retirement in 1935, when he made his work as numismatist to the Library a full-time occupation.

He built up an extensive library of books specializing in Australiana which he sold in 1935.

== Other interests ==
Based on his work in country regions of Victoria, Kenyon knew much of the post-settlement history of rural Victoria.

Institutions of which he was a member include:

- Institution of Engineers Australia
- Australasian Institute of Mining and Metallurgy of which he was treasurer 1897, secretary 1906, and president in 1928
- Historical Society of Victoria, and served as president
- Field Naturalists Club of Victoria and served as vice-president
- Royal Society of Victoria
- Anthropological Society of Victoria
- Australian and New Zealand Association for the Advancement of Science
- Society of Genealogists, Australia.
- Victorian Numismatic Society

== Publications ==
- A. S. Kenyon The Overlanders
- A. S. Kenyon The Story of the Mallee (1916)
- A. S. Kenyon and Charles Barrett Blackfellows of Australia (1930s)
- A. S. Kenyon and Charles Barrett Australian Aboriginal Art (1947)
- A. S. Kenyon Stuart Murray on Irrigation in Victoria (1925)
- A. S. Kenyon and R. V. Billis Pastures New
- A. S. Kenyon and R. V. Billis The First Century
- A. S. Kenyon and R. V. Billis The Pastoral Pioneers of Port Phillip and Victoria
- A. S. Kenyon The story of Australia : its discoverers and founders (1937)
- Kenyon and Billis contributed more than 200 biographies of pastoral pioneers to The Australasian and The Argus

== Recognition ==
The A. S. Kenyon Library, Red Cliffs, was named for him. A portrait of him by Graham Thorley, short-listed for the 1940 Archibald Prize, hangs there.

== Family ==
Kenyon married Alexandrine Amelie Leontine Delepine ( – 20 August 1940) on 2 April 1895; they had one daughter:

- Justine Agnes Delepine "Jim" Kenyon (16 September 1897 – 3 October 1988) married Otto Colerio Tyrer in August 1938, and ran an acclaimed farm "The Retreat", Merriwagga, New South Wales.

Justine was the author of The Aboriginal Word Book, a popular source of house names in the first half of the twentieth century, when that practice was fashionable.

They had a home at Lower Plenty Road, Heidelberg, where he died; his remains were interred in the Heidelberg cemetery.
