= Frank A. Moss =

Australian mine manager

Francis Ambrose Moss (1862 – 30 July 1940) was a mine manager in Perth, Western Australia.

== History ==
Moss was born at Mount Barker, South Australia to Simeon Moss and Annie Moss, née Thompson (c. 1825 – 15 February 1886).

He was educated at Whinham College in North Adelaide, and the Ballarat School of Mines, graduating in 1889. He began working for BHP at Broken Hill, becoming chief assayer, then worked as assistant metallurgist at its Port Pirie smelter.

He returned to Broken Hill, where he spent a year working underground, then another year at the Victorian goldfields. He sailed to Albany, Western Australia in October 1893 with his brother Ned, and according to one report travelled on foot to Coolgardie (some 700 km), where they worked the Coonega and Lady Margaret goldfields near Comet Vale, though the credit for their discovery may belong to their associate Dan Baker. He purchased the Sand Queen claim, from two of its finders, Tom Caldwell and Dick Delaney. After some disappointments this claim later proved to be highly valuable.

In 1895 he moved to Menzies, some 35 km away, to serve as manager of the Central Exploration Company.

By 1897 he was BHP's representative in Western Australia, with temporary offices in Hannan Street, Kalgoorlie, offering to purchase gold-bearing ore of any description.

That same year he was working as assayer for the Kalgurli mine on the Golden Mile, then in April 1900 was appointed general manager of that and the Hainault mine. In 1907 he resigned both positions (replaced by Archie Hay and Robert S. Black) to set up a tin dredging plant at Greenbushes, Western Australia, which he ran for 17 years. During this period he also managed the Sand Queen mine. In 1915 he purchased the Lancefield mine at Beria with Richard Hamilton and George Ridgway.

He died at his home at 31 Angelo Street, South Perth and was buried in the Church of England section of Karrakatta Cemetery.

== Affiliations ==
- Australasian Institute of Mining Engineers, president 1907
- He was a trustee of the Perth and Kalgoorlie (Anglican) dioceses
