= Maurice Mawby =

Australian mining industry leader (1904–1977)

Sir Maurice Mawby
- Born: 31 August 1904; Broken Hill, New South Wales, Australia
- Died: 4 August 1977 (aged 72); East Melbourne, Victoria, Australia
- Known for: Chairman of CRA and Comalco

Sir Maurice Alan Edgar Mawby CBE FAA (31 August 1904 – 4 August 1977) was an Australian mining industry leader.
