= Beria, Western Australia =

Abandoned town in Western Australia

Beria Western Australia
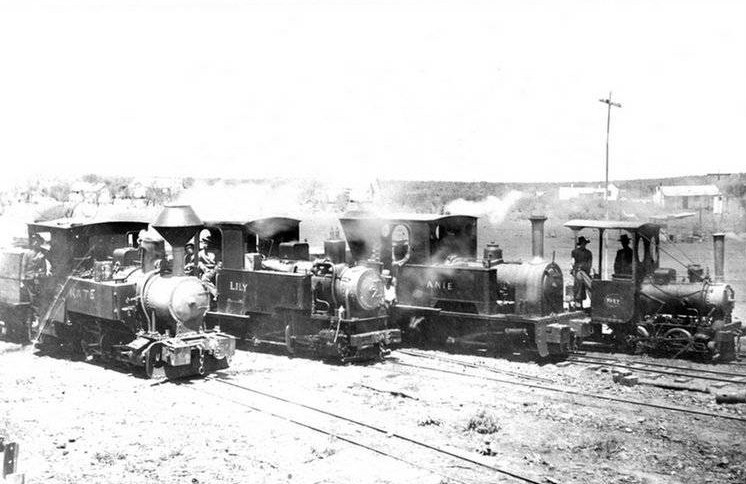
- Kalgoorlie and Boulder Firewood Co.'s woodline locomotives Kate, Lily, Anie, and Mary, at Beria, c. 1910

- Coordinates: 28.5641°S 122.3815°E
- Established: 1905
- Postcode(s): 6440
- Elevation: 460 m (1,509 ft)
- Location: 965 km (600 mi) NNE of Perth; 8 km (5 mi) north of Laverton
- LGA(s): Shire of Laverton
- State electorate(s): Kalgoorlie
- Federal division(s): O'Connor

Beria is an abandoned town in the Goldfields-Esperance region of Western Australia, located 8 kilometres (5 mi) north of Laverton on the Laverton-Leonora Road.

The Beria townsite was surveyed and gazetted in 1905. Later in 1936 a new townsite was gazetted immediately to the south to allow an increased buffer area with the Lancefield mine plant. The Indigenous Australian word for the area is Tinbeeringtharra but the name Beria, another Indigenous Australian word meaning large open field was suggested by the surveyor John Rowe as a more suitable alternative.

Gold was discovered in the area just north of the later townsite by prospectors Lemon, Hungerford, Elmes and Clement in 1897. Lemon named the mining claim Lancefield after his hometown in Victoria. The manager of the Mount Malcolm mine at Murrin Murrin, W. Thomas Horton, became interested in the find and formed a syndicate in 1898. A battery was erected close to the reef and production began in January 1899. In less than two years, the battery treated 16,000 tonnes of ore and recovered 7,200 ounces of gold. The Lancefield Goldmining Company, based in London, took over the mine in 1904 with Herbert Hoover as one of the directors. By 1905 the mine had produced 54,909 ounces of gold.

The mine then experienced problems when sulphide ores containing arsenic and copper were found and the entire plant had to be shut down and reorganised to a dry crushing and roasting plant. Roasters were installed to roast the ore with each requiring 2,000 tons of wood to roast 7,000 tons of ore.

A tramway was constructed between the mine and Laverton by the Kalgoorlie and Boulder Firewood company in 1908, to collect and deliver wood from surrounding areas to feed the roasters and boilers, and for underground mine support.

The plant was in liquidation by 1913 and was eventually bought in 1914 by the Kalgoorlie and Boulder Firewood company, who changed the name to the Beria Consuls Mines. The mine changed ownership again in 1915 to the Lancefield company, run by George Ridgway, Dick Hamilton and Frank A. Moss. The tramway was no longer operating and was removed by 1916. The Lancefield company operated the mine until 1940. By the 1950s the mine had produced over 552,000 ounces of gold and 52,000 ounces of silver.

The main stack of the mine was demolished in 1984.

As part of the near-by Windarra Nickel Project, WMC Resources resumed mining at Lancefield during a downturn in nickel prices. Gold mining operations at Lancefield lasted from 1981 to 1994, with the ore treated at the Windarra plant. During this 13-year spell of production, the mine produced 714,884 ounces of gold, processing 5,147,230 tonnes of ore with a grade of 4.32 grams per tonne.
