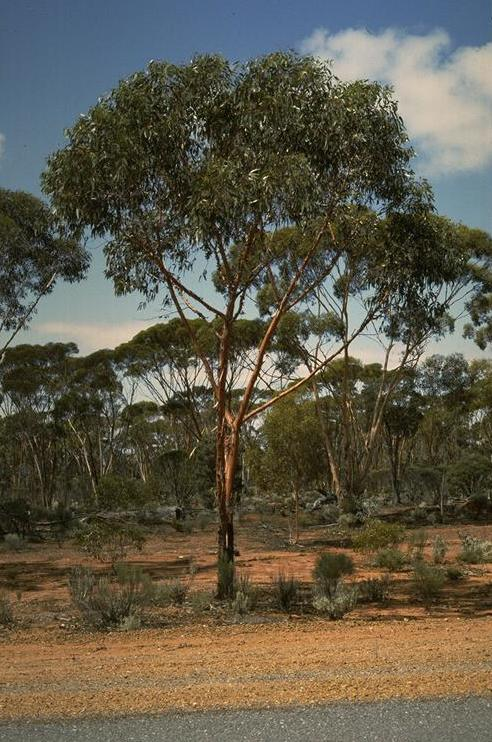
- Eucalyptus stricklandii north of Norseman

Scientific classification
- Kingdom: Plantae
- Clade: Embryophytes
- Clade: Tracheophytes
- Clade: Spermatophytes
- Clade: Angiosperms
- Clade: Eudicots
- Clade: Rosids
- Order: Myrtales
- Family: Myrtaceae
- Genus: Eucalyptus
- Species: E. stricklandii

Binomial name
- Eucalyptus stricklandii Maiden

Synonyms
- Eucalyptus stricklandi Maiden orth. var.

= Eucalyptus stricklandii =

Strickland's gum

Species of eucalyptus

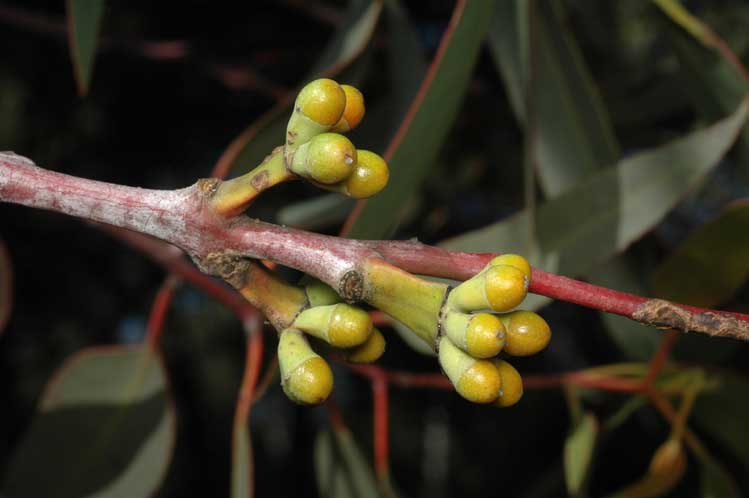
Flower buds

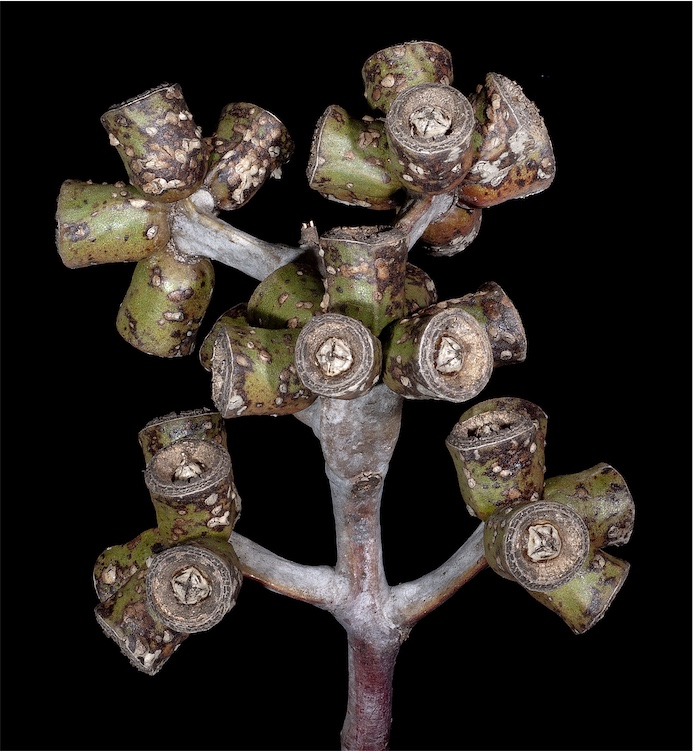
Fruit

Eucalyptus stricklandii, commonly known as Strickland's gum, is a species of small tree that is endemic to Western Australia, but possibly also naturalised in Victoria. It has rough, crumbly to flaky bark near the base of the trunk, smooth reddish brown to grey bark above, lance-shaped adult leaves, flower buds in groups of seven, yellow flowers and bell-shaped fruit.

== Description ==
Eucalyptus stricklandii is a tree that typically grows to a height of 4–11 m (13–36 ft) and does not form a lignotuber. It has rough, crumbly to flaky bark on the lower part of the trunk, smooth reddish brown to grey bark above. Young plants and coppice regrowth have thick, dull green to greyish egg-shaped leaves that are 100–150 mm (3.9–5.9 in) long and 60–80 mm (2.4–3.1 in) wide. Adult leaves are thick, glossy green, lance-shaped to curved, 105–185 mm (4.1–7.3 in) long and 60–80 mm (2.4–3.1 in) wide, tapering to a petiole 23–43 mm (0.91–1.69 in) long. The flower buds are arranged in leaf axils in groups of seven on a, glaucous, flattened, unbranched peduncle 10–28 mm (0.39–1.10 in) long, the individual buds more or less sessile. Mature buds are cylindrical but flared, just below the join with the operculum, 20–25 mm (0.79–0.98 in) long and 8–12 mm (0.31–0.47 in) wide with a conical to rounded operculum. Flowering occurs from November to December or from January to March and the flowers are yellow. The fruit is a woody, bell-shaped capsule 10–18 mm (0.39–0.71 in) long and 10–15 mm (0.39–0.59 in) wide with the valves near rim level.

== Taxonomy and naming ==
Eucalyptus stricklandii was first formally described in 1911 by Joseph Maiden in the Journal of the Natural History & Science Society of Western Australia. The specific epithet (stricklandii) honours Gerald Strickland.

== Distribution and habitat ==
Strickland's gum grows on ridges, rocky hills and sometimes near creeks in woodland from near Coolgardie to Norseman in the Coolgardie and Murchison biogeographic regions. It has been cultivated in semi-arid areas of Victoria and may also be naturalised in the north-west of that state.

== Conservation status ==
This eucalypt is classified as "not threatened" by the Western Australian Government Department of Parks and Wildlife.

== See also ==
- List of Eucalyptus species
