= Ian Wark =

Australian chemist and scientific administrator

Sir Ian William Wark CMG CBE FAA (8 May 1899 – 20 April 1985) was an Australian chemist and scientific administrator. He was the recipient of the ANZAAS Medal in 1973. After his death, the Ian Wark Research Institute was established in 1994. This endeavored to support new innovative research methods with other organisations including the CSIRO. The first Director of the Institute was John Ralston AO, from 1994 to 2015.
