= H. R. Hancock =

Henry Richard Hancock (1 April 1836 – 14 January 1919), almost invariably referred to as "Captain Hancock", (Note: "Captain" was a title traditionally bestowed by (esp. Cornish) miners on their supervisor.) was a mine superintendent in Moonta and Wallaroo, South Australia. He was noted for his business acumen and the respect with which he was held by both workers and mine owners.

== History ==
Hancock was the third, and the eldest surviving, son of George Hancock (c. 1803 – 22 February 1848), wheelwright and Wesleyan Methodist lay preacher and his wife Sarah Hancock, née Lipson (c. 1799– ), who married on 1 June 1830 and lived in Horrabridge, near Tavistock, West Devon.

He received a good education and at the age of sixteen began work at the nearby copper and tin mines, learning every aspect of their operation. In 1858 he was brought out to South Australia as superintendent of the Wheal Ellen, a small silver-lead and copper mine near Woodchester, South Australia, between Strathalbyn and Callington. It is reported that his abilities were noticed by (later Sir) Thomas Elder, who after that contract was over (c. January 1862), recommended to Hancock that he not return to England, but make his fortune in South Australia, sentiments echoed by Robert Barr Smith.

By 1863 he was in charge of the assay office of the copper mine at Moonta, where a rich find had been made a few years earlier. He was then made surveyor, and made himself thoroughly conversant with the layout of the underground workings. In July 1864 he was made superintendent of Moonta Mines.

Hancock and Captain William Arundel Paynter (1819–1873) invented and patented an improved "jigger" (a device employing water and agitation to separate ore from the lighter stuff). Their invention not only required less labor to operate, but wasted less copper-bearing ore, and as the Hancock jig was in use worldwide for many years.

When the richest ore had been mined and there was much talk of closing the mines at Moonta and nearby Wallaroo, Hancock was put in charge of both operations, and by diligent management kept both operational. When he retired, to be replaced by his son H. Lipson Hancock JP, he had been superintendent of the one for 34 years and the other for 22.

He retired in August 1898 and left Moonta the following October, when he and Mrs Hancock were accorded an elaborate farewell.

Their home "Ivymeade" in Burnside was advertised for sale in 1902, and became the residence of Dr. Alfred Edward James Russell, who died there in 1905. It was again advertised in 1907. Captain Hancock died there, as did his wife Loveday Hancock, after which it was finally sold by auction in 1934, to Captain W. B. White.

== Memberships and other interests ==
- Hancock was active in the Moonta Methodist church, notably the Sunday School, and was a teetotaler.
- He was a member of the North of England Institute of Mining and Mechanical Engineers
- He was in 1893 a foundation councillor of the Australasian Institute of Mining Engineers
- He was elected a member of the Royal Colonial Institute
- He was a member of the Australasian Association for the Advancement of Science

== Family ==
Hancock married Sarah Annie Maynard ( – 27 June 1870) on 24 April 1866. She died at Moonta Mines of typhoid fever.

- H(enry) Lipson Hancock (5 March 1867 – 7 September 1935) married Ada Mary Roach in 1867. In 1903 he succeeded his father as captain of the Moonta and Wallaroo mines and the smelting works at Wallaroo.
- Leigh George Hancock (1868 – 23 August 1943), metallurgist, married Ethel ??, lived at Bondi, New South Wales.
- Annie Ellen Hancock (1869–1923) married Albert Dawe of Kadina on 30 November 1901

He married again, to Loveday Maria Jolly (c. 1850 in South Africa – 3 May 1930) on 28 August 1872. She died at her home, "Ivymeade", High Street, Burnside

- Edwin Joseph Hancock (1877 – 6 July 1934) married Ella Alice Russell ( –1956) in 1901, lived at Jetty Road, Brighton, then "Hillington", Athelstone
- Ethel Loveday Hancock (c. October 1878 – 22 August 1882) died of croup
- Edith Mary Hancock (1880–1964) married Horace Stephen Bennett in 1907, lived at Mount Lofty
- William Rupert Hancock (1881–1946) lived at Brighton
- Frank Ethelbert Hancock (1883–1933) married Helen Gertrude Bruce in 1907, lived on Eyre Peninsula
- Myra Elizabeth Hancock (1886–1938) married Richard William Pascoe, lived in US.
- Clement Richard Hancock (1887–1969) married Mary Cresswell, lived at Parraba on Eyre Peninsula
- Alfred Vernon Hancock (1889– ) married Gladys Cresswell, lived at Burnside
