= John Warren (mining engineer) =

Mining engineer and manager in Australia

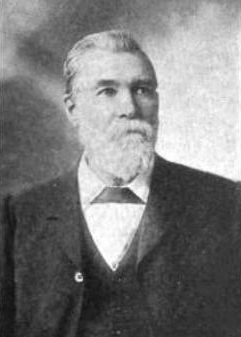
- In The Sketch, 9 May 1900
- Born: c. 1837; Newton Abbot, England
- Died: 31 October 1910; North Adelaide, Australia
- Occupation(s): Mining engineer, mine manager

John Warren (c. 1837 – 31 October 1910), frequently styled "Captain Warren" or "Captain Jack" after the traditional (esp. Cornish) mining practice, was a mining engineer and mine manager in Australia.

== History ==
Warren was born in Newton Abbot, England, and from age thirteen was working in the mining business. He had experience in the east county mines including Dolcoath and Tavistock and later in America.

He was in South Australia by October 1864, when in response to a newspaper advertisement, he succeeded George Vercoe as manager of the Karkarilla mine, Tipara, one of the complex of copper mines at Moonta.

Vercoe would later accuse Warren of incompetence as a mine manager and as a geologist, to which Warren countered just as bluntly. Percy Wells was another trenchant critic.

The Karkarilla mine became uneconomic and was taken over by another company in 1867 and renamed Hamley, and Warren, while being retained, was also made responsible for the nearby Paramatta mine, and 1869 the Wheal James mine.

He resigned from the Paramatta company on 25 November 1876, and for two and a half years was in charge of the Balade mine, New Caledonia.

He returned to South Australia, where he served as manager of the short-lived Bird-in-Hand gold mine near Woodside.

That was followed by the Block 10 mine at Broken Hill, which he managed for over ten years.

He assisted T. J. Greenway in tackling the "sulphide problem".

Zinc sulphide, which constituted a fair percentage of the ore body, was much more difficult to reduce to the metal than the oxides and carbonates of silver and lead, which were the initial source of the mines' wealth. Sulphide tailings accumulated in great heaps at the mines, or was simply not brought to the surface. Greenway, engineer for Block 14 and later the Broken Hill South mines, put considerable effort into crushing and concentrating the ore, which could then be more economically shipped to Europe for processing.

A strike called by the Amalgamated Miners' Association and other unions in Broken Hill was held ?? – November 1892 after the Mineowners' Association cancelled stope workers' contracts and imposed a contract payment system. Warren held fast against the unions by taking on new workers, mostly from Moonta, and still meeting their production targets.

In June 1901 Warren resigned from Block 10 after a dispute with assistant manager L. W. Grayson, who also resigned and set up in business as a consulting engineer. A petition signed by most employees of the mine urged Warren to reconsider. He must have relented, as he was reappointed to his old position in July.

In 1902 he was both elected president of the Australasian Institute of Mining Engineers and appointed Justice of the Peace. In April he again resigned, after he had been obliged to effect a number of economies, including the termination of many jobs. His replacement was V. F. Stanley-Low.

He was for a short time in 1903 manager of the Cobar-Chesney mine, and the Broken Hill Junction Mining Company for about a year 1904–05.

== Inventions ==
- Around 1874 Warren and Fred May, chief engineer at Moonta Mines, invented an improved jigging machine (separates heavy crushed ore from the light stuff, using water and a shaking action), which was proven at the Hamley mine and the Lady Alice near Gawler. A copy of the machine, made by James Martin & Co. of Gawler, was sent to the Balade mine, New Caledonia, in 1875.

Others to develop jigging machines were Cowling, Hancock, Petherick.

- He invented a vanner or vanning table, of which the Wilfley table is an example
- He patented improvements to the magnetic ore separator.

== Other interests ==
- While in Broken Hill, Warren was founder and president of the local Boys' Brigade.
- Also while in Broken Hill, he was active in the Horticultural Society.

== Recognition ==
- The Warren vanner, which he developed, was named for him.
- In 1893 he was presented by the mine's grateful management with a model of the Block 10 surface workings, crafted in silver by J. M. Wendt.

== Family ==
Warren had a daughter born 4 December 1866 It is likely both mother and daughter were named Mary Ann or Mary Anne, and one died 1866 and the other 1867.

He married again, to Marian Mortimore (c. 1838 – 12 November 1903), date and place not yet found. They had a daughter:

- Marian Warren (c. 1873 – 14 July 1923) married Frederick Thomas Collins (c. 1878 – 10 September 1937) in 1906. They had a daughter on 14 May 1906, another on 26 November 1910. John Warren was living at their place, 6 Mackinnon Parade, North Adelaide, when he died; earlier he had a home on Prospect Road, Prospect.

Collins married again on 23 November 1925 to Dora Baker.

John Warren died in North Adelaide on 31 October 1910.
