= Stanbridge Earls School =

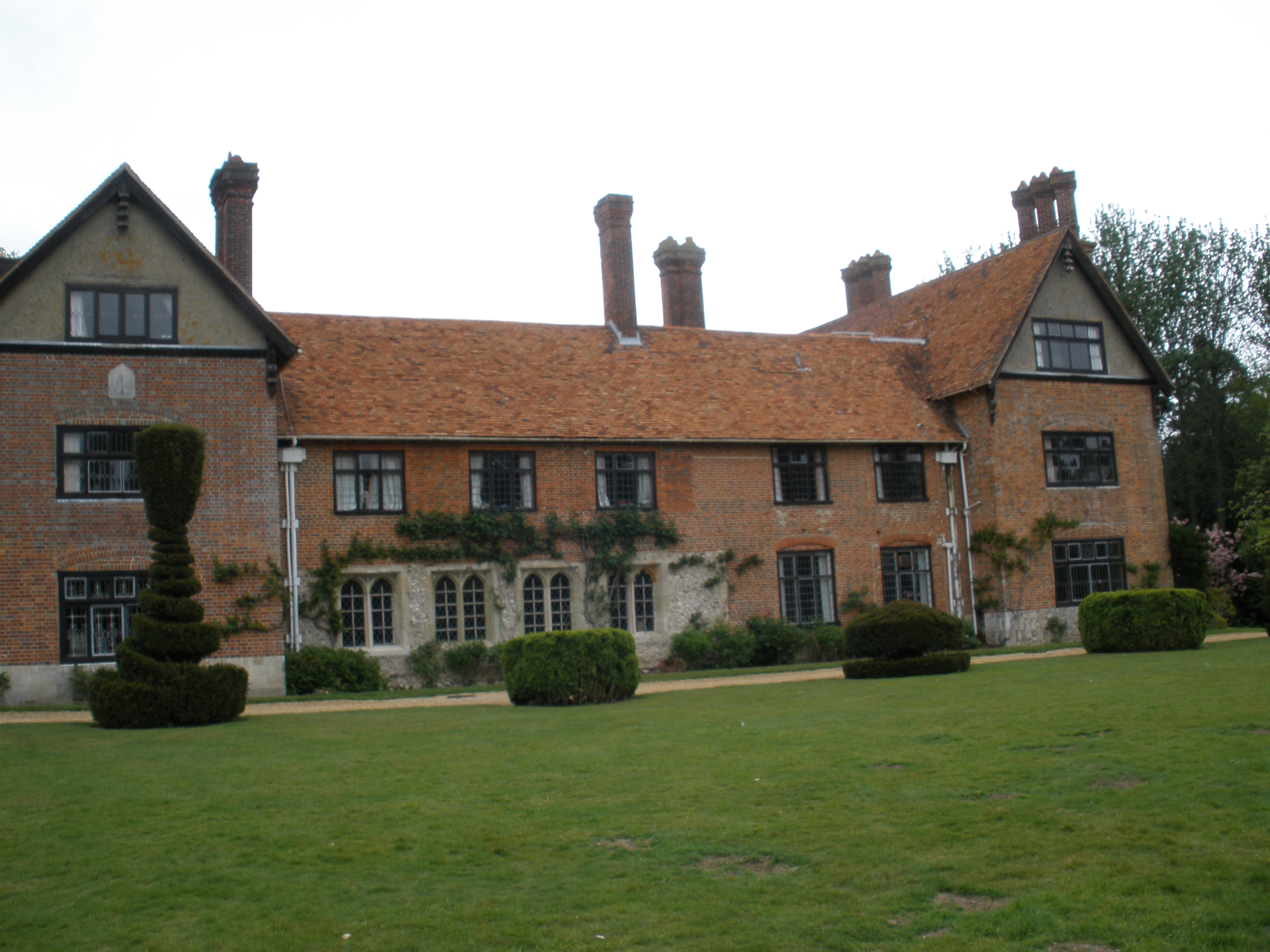
- Main school building, viewed from the rear

Location
- Stanbridge Lane; Romsey, Hampshire, SO51 0ZS; United Kingdom; 51.007133°N 1.520027°W

Information
- Type: Independent special school
- Motto: "Building confidence – Achieving success"
- Established: 15 September 1952
- Closed: 1 September 2013
- Department for Education URN: 116549 Tables
- Gender: Mixed
- Age: 10 to 19
- URN (Social Care): SC012020

Stanbridge Earls School was a coeducational independent special school located near Romsey, Hampshire, England. Students ranged in age from 10 to 19. The school catered for both boarding and day pupils. The school specialized in teaching and helping pupils with dyslexia, dyscalculia, developmental coordination disorder and mild autistic spectrum disorder. In 2013 the school was criticised for excluding a pupil who claimed that she had been raped. The school closed in 2013, following a series of inspections and investigations, when reduced pupil numbers led to it becoming financially unviable.

The school's trustees sold the site to a private purchaser who subsequently sold it for £10 million to Audley Retirement Villages. Audley plan to build a retirement village of 100 homes on the site, with the main school building retained and converted into a health club, restaurant and bistro for the community.

== Building and grounds ==
The main building of the former school is a Tudor manor house which contained the reception and maths department. It is a Grade II* listed building. The school was set in grounds covering 54 acres (220,000 m^{2}).

== Controversy and closure ==
=== Special Educational Needs and Disability Tribunal ===
The school was investigated by the Department for Education (DfE) following a tribunal which had raised safety concerns after examining the way Stanbridge Earls had dealt with historic claims that a 15-year-old girl pupil had been allegedly raped twice by other pupils and a 12-year-old girl pupil had been sexually assaulted. The Special Educational Needs and Disability Tribunal (SENDIST) said that a "vulnerable youngster had suffered appalling abuse at the hands of another student" and found the school to be "unsystematic, unprofessional, ad hoc and completely inadequate" when it came to protecting the youngsters. The report said the school had "no understanding of its duties" and its failure to act was "beyond the tribunal's comprehension". The tribunal described headteacher Peter Trythall's conduct as "bordering on contempt for statutory duties". It said the incidents raised "serious concerns" which needed to be addressed by Ofsted, the Secretary of State for Education and Hampshire County Council, while other local authorities should reconsider placement of their pupils at the school.

=== Ofsted ===
An Ofsted inspection report, published in February 2013, said the school had failed to identify how it cared for the needs of individual students and did not make individual risk assessments "even in cases where the risk of harm that a child poses to others or themselves is known to be high". A follow-up inspection took place in May 2013. It found that "As a consequence of continuing weaknesses with leadership and governance, children remain unsafe at this residential special school" and that "urgent improvements called for by Ofsted have not been made due to a lack of 'clear and incisive' leadership." On 19 June 2013 it was announced that Ofsted had taken disciplinary action against some of its own staff after admitting mistakes were made during previous inspections which had rated the school as "outstanding". An Ofsted spokesperson said: "We have carried out a review of the inspection history of the school from 2011. It is clear that our inspections could have got underneath what was happening sooner."

=== Operation Flamborough ===
Operation Flamborough, an internal Hampshire Constabulary inquiry, was launched to determine whether police involved in previous investigations into sex abuse claims at the school in 2011 should be disciplined. Hampshire Constabulary said they wanted to find out whether any criminal offences had been committed against the known victims or other children attending the school. The operation concluded on 2 May 2014 and the CPS announced that there was "insufficient evidence to bring charges" against any of the staff or the 10 pupils originally accused. This decision came after one of the most extensive reviews made by several different Police Constabularies taking over "6,000 hours of police time in the investigations". Allegations made against Chief Constable Andy Marsh were also found unjustified. "Essex Police had confirmed it found "no grounds to justify" the allegations relating to Stanbridge Earls School, near Romsey" and he was formally "cleared of misconduct after investigation into Stanbridge Earls School" on 10 June 2014.

=== Charity Commission ===
On 1 December 2014 the Charity Commission initially cleared the Trustees of Stanbridge of any wrongdoing and stated "they acted properly in the wake of a pupil's allegation of rape" and further commented "the school's financial future hung in the balance "as a result of the style of coverage by the press and media" over the allegation and the tribunal's decision." In March 2015, however, concerns were raised about the accuracy of the report. The report was removed from the commission's website and a spokesman said: "Issues have been raised with the Commission by a third party about the content of the Statement of Results of Inquiry on Stanbridge Earls School Trust and the basis for the findings and conclusions drawn in it. The Commission has opened an assessment case to review the basis of and evidence for those claims to determine whether any adjustments to the report are required or should new information be provided, whether it will be necessary to re-open the inquiry." The Commission subsequently opened a statutory inquiry in October 2015.

=== Hampshire Safeguarding Children Board ===
In May 2015, it was reported that Hampshire Safeguarding Children Board were conducting a Serious Case Review of the school and the events leading to its closure. Maggie Blyth, Independent Chair of the board, said: "An independent review of events pertaining to the circumstances that led to the closure of Stanbridge Earls was commissioned and is currently nearing the final stages of completion. The purpose of the review was to identify and consider any lessons that could be learned by agencies in the light of the unusual nature of that episode - the apparent failings in the application of safeguarding policies and procedures by an independent school which has now closed."

=== Closure ===
In late-2013 the school was informed by the DfE "that they do not wish the School to continue trading with the existing governance." Two proposals to take over the running of the school fell away and on 2 September 2013 the school announced that insolvency administrators had been called in. In a letter to parents on behalf of the board of trustees, David Du Croz, the chairman, called the move a "very sad outcome". He added that it was a "tragic end to a once great school."

== Notable former pupils ==
- Christopher Gibbs, art dealer
- Tom Hart Dyke
- David Manners, 11th Duke of Rutland
- Guy Ritchie (expelled)
- Marc Sinden
