= Chamber of Minerals and Energy of Western Australia =

Mining industry organisation in Australia

The Chamber of Minerals and Energy of Western Australia (CME) is the peak organisation for mining businesses and employers in Western Australia (WA).

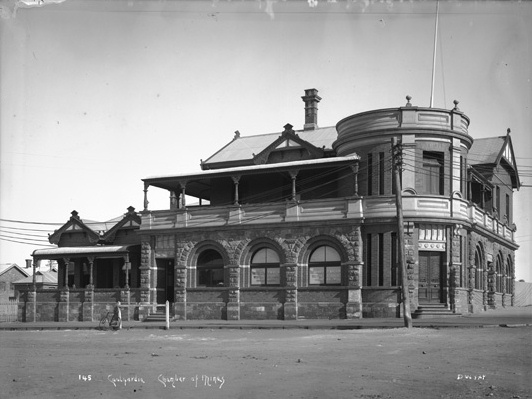
The Coolgardie Chamber of Mines building, circa 1900, when the chamber merged with its counterpart in Kalgoorlie.

It originated with previous bodies that emerged during the 1890s in the Goldfields region. The Coolgardie Chamber of Mines and Commerce, founded in 1895, was followed in 1896 by a separate Kalgoorlie Chamber of Mines. A Perth Chamber of Mines, founded in 1897, quickly became defunct.

The Coolgardie and Kalgoorlie bodies merged in 1900, as the Chamber of Mines of Western Australia. The headquarters of the combined body were in the Kalgoorlie Chamber of Mines building. In the same era, there was also in London, a Westralian Chamber of Mines. The Chamber of Mines formed a security unit known as "The Bureau", to prevent and investigate gold theft and, from 1907, the chamber financed the WA Police Gold Squad (known later as the Gold Stealing Detection Unit), initially with an annual contribution of £2,000 per annum (more than $275,000 in 2016).

In the 1960s, other geological resources and regions became significant, such as iron ore, oil and natural gas in the Pilbara, along with nickel, bauxite and mineral sands elsewhere, the organisation was renamed the Chamber of Minerals and Energy. It later moved to purpose-built headquarters in Perth.

== See also ==
- Sir Laurence Brodie-Hall
- Chamber of Commerce and Industry of Western Australia
