= AMIRA =

Australian mining research organisation

Amira Global Ltd
- Type: Not–for–profit
- Industry: Research and development
- Founded: 1959; 67 years ago in Melbourne, Victoria
- Founder: CSIRO
- Headquarters: Perth, Western Australia, Australia
- Key people: Sir Lindesay Clark (former councillor); Beryl Jacka (former Secretary); Jim May (former CEO)
- Revenue: $7.8 million (2014)
- Number of employees: 10-20
- Website: amira.global

Australian Minerals Industry Research Association Limited (AMIRA), now AMIRA Global is a mining research and development organisation that was founded in 1959 in Melbourne, Australia. In the early 2000s, the association changed its name to Amira Global, to incorporate its international connections.

== History ==
AMIRA first formed in 1959 by the Commonwealth Scientific and Industrial Research Organisation (CSIRO), to support the growing mining industry's research component. In a 1961 letter from the University of Queensland (UQ), to the inaugural secretary of AMIRA, Beryl Jacka, detailed the foundational aspirations of the new organisation. This was to "facilitate the technological advancement of its members in the coal, petroleum and associated industries". However, for the first decade of its existence, it struggled to make ends meet. In addition, there was no permanent CEO of the not for profit organisation until July 1968. In that year, Jim May was appointed AMIRA's first full time CEO in which he served in this capacity until his retirement in 1994. In that time, May initiated the ‘AMIRA model’ in which research and development (R&D) collaborative methods were introduced throughout the organisation. Thus, by the 1980s, AMIRA became the preferred mechanism for minerals research in Australia and many other countries as the organisation began to spread beyond Australia. Some of those countries that AMIRA has and maintains strong connections is Chile, South Africa and the United States to name a few. Upon May's retirement, the organisation had grown to encompass over 50 staff with 70 projects valued at over $30 million. From the 1990s, AMIRA remained a leading research body for many large mining companies. However, it changed its name to simply ‘AMIRA’ to reflect the international approach the company was becoming. Moreover, as the organisation began to branch further out from its beginnings in Melbourne, the company moved its base to Perth, Western Australia, to be closer to the mineral industry in the state.

Between 1973 and 2004, AMIRA won various prizes in the mining industry through its research. This included the Prince Philip prize for industrial design in 1973, and the Eureka Australian Museum Prize for industry in 1992, respectively.

== Company heads ==
Below, lists the CEOs of AMIRA since its first permanent full time CEO was appointed in 1968 to the present.

CEOs of AMIRA Limited
Order	MDs / CEOs	Period	Reference
1	Dr Jim May AM	1968–1994	
2	Unknown person	1994–2004	
3	Deming Whitman	2004–2009	
4	Unknown person	2009–2012	
5	Joe Cucuzza	2012–2019	
6	Dr Jacqui Coombes	2019–2023	
7	Vaughan Chamberlain	2023–present	
