= Australasian Institute of Mining and Metallurgy =

Professional association

- Founded: 1893
- Type: Professional Association
- Purpose: Mining & Metallurgy
- Location: Carlton, Victoria, Australia
- Region served: Australia, Papua New Guinea, New Zealand, Hong Kong,Chile,Peru
- Method: Professional development
- Members: 15,500
- Key people: Chris Carr (President); Stephen Durkin (CEO)
- Revenue: ·
- Endowment: ·
- Employees: .
- Website: www.ausimm.com.au

The Australasian Institute of Mining and Metallurgy (AusIMM) provides services to professionals engaged in all facets of the global minerals sector and is based in Carlton, Victoria, Australia.

== History ==
The Institute had its genesis in 1893 with the formation in Adelaide of the Australasian Institute of Mining Engineers drawing its inspiration from the success of the American Institute of Mining Engineers, and some impetus from the Mine Managers Association of Broken Hill. Office-holders were equally from South Australia and "The Hill", where the Institute established its headquarters.

This approach to the foundation of a federal organization was welcomed in mining districts of other Australian colonies. and branches were formed in Broken Hill, the Thames Goldfield (New Zealand), Ballarat, and elsewhere. Succeeding annual conferences were held at Ballarat, Hobart, Broken Hill and other mining centres. The 1926 conference was held in Otago, New Zealand.

In 1896 its headquarters were removed from Broken Hill to Melbourne, and in June 1919 adopted its present name. In 1954 the institute applied for a royal charter, granted 1955.

The AusIMM represents more than 15 500 members drawn from all sections of the industry and supported by a network of branches and societies in Australasia and internationally.

== Member grades and post-nominals ==
Honorary Fellow of the AusIMM	HonFAusIMM
Fellow of the AusIMM	FAusIMM
Member of the AusIMM	MAusIMM
Associate member of the AusIMM	AAusIMM
Student member of the AusIMM	SAusIMM

== Some notable members ==
AIME

- Sir Henry Ayers foundation president, 1893
- Ralph Tate foundation vice-president, 1893
- Henry Yorke Lyell Brown, government geologist of South Australia, 1893–1928
- Uriah Dudley foundation general secretary 1893–1897
- David Lauder Stirling (c. 1871 – 30 August 1949); president 1894, secretary 1906–1941 or later; also secretary, Victorian Chamber of Mines 1898–1945
- H. W. Ferd Kayser (mine manager Mount Bischoff Tin Mining Company), vice-president 1894, president 1898, 1899
- Alexander Montgomery (government geologist in New Zealand, Tasmania, and Western Australia), president 1895
- Ernest Lidgey geological surveyor in Victoria; conducted Australia's first geophysical surveys; president 1901
- Samuel Henry McGowan (c. 1845 – 13 May 1921), accountant specializing in gold mining companies, mayor of Bendigo 1899–1900; president 1902
- F. Danvers Power, lecturer at Sydney University, president 1897, 1904.
- Robert C. Sticht general manager, Mount Lyell Mining & Railway Company, president 1905, 1915, vice-president 1909
- G. D. Delprat (manager of the Broken Hill mine), president 1906
- Dr. Alfred William Howitt, C.M.G., F.G.S., the eminent naturalist, was president 1907
- Frank A. Moss, (general manager of Kalgurli Gold Mines), president 1907
- C. F. Courtney (general manager of the Sulphide Corporation), president 1908
- Richard Hamilton, (general manager of the Great Boulder Proprietary mine), president 1909, vice-president 1910
- G. A. Richard (of Mount Morgan, Queensland), president 1910
- Herman Carl Bellinger from US; mine manager, Cobar 1909–1914, president 1912
- James Hebbard (manager of the Central Mine, Broken Hill), president 1913
- John Warren (mining) (manager of Block 10, Broken Hill), vice-president 1894, president 1902
- Hyman Herman (director of the Victorian geological survey), joined 1897, president 1914, remained councillor to 1959.
- Robert Silvers Black, (general manager of Kalgurli Gold Mines), president 1917
- J. W. Sutherland metallurgist at Lake View Consols and Golden Horse Shoe gold mines; president 1918
- Professor D. B. Waters of Otago, New Zealand, vice-president 1917, 1918 (absent for most of this period — he was with New Zealand Tunnelling Company in France).

AIMM

- R. W. Chapman, vice-president 1906, president 1920
- Colin Fraser (later Sir Colin), president 1923
- H. W. Gepp, later Sir Herbert William Gepp, president 1924
- Ernest W. Skeats (professor of geology, University of Melbourne), vice-president 1924, president 1925
- David Lauder Stirling, general secretary 1922–45
- R. M. Murray (general manager, Mount Lyell Mining & Railway Company), president 1927
- Alfred Stephen Kenyon, treasurer 1897, secretary 1906, president 1928
- E. C. Andrews (New South Wales Government Geologist), president 1929
- William Edward Wainwright (general manager of Broken Hill South), president 1919, 1930, vice-president 1916–18, 1933, 1934
- Wiliam Harley Wainwright son of W. E. Wainwright, (chief metallurgist, BHP) life member
- Essington Lewis (managing director of BHP) vice-president 1932, president 1935
- Andrew Fairweather, president 1932 (succeeded W. E. Mainwright at Broken Hill South mine and as General Manager)
- Professor J. Neill Greenwood (dean of Melbourne University Faculty of Applied Science), president 1936, 1937
- Donald Yates, superintendent of Broken Hill Associated Smelters Pty., president 1937
- Julius Kruttschnitt (general manager, Mount Isa Mines) president 1939
- Oliver H. Woodward (general manager, North Mine, Broken Hill) active in tunnelling operations WWI, president 1940
- Arthur H. P. Moline (1877–1965) (succeeded R. M. Murray as general manager, Mount Lyell, in 1944), president 1945
- Asdruebal James Keast (general manager, Zinc Corporation; Australian Aluminium Production Commission 1951–55), president 1946, vice-president 1947
- Frank R. Hockey / Francis Richard Hockey (general superintendent, BHP), president 1947, vice-president 1949, 1950
- F. F. Espie / Frank Fancett Espie (general superintendent, Western Mining Corporation), president 1948
- Godfrey Bernard O'Malley, vice-president 1943–46
- Maurice Alan Edgar Mawby (director of exploration, Zinc Corporation, Limited), vice-president 1950, 1951, president 1953, 1954
- Ian Munro McLennan (General Manager, BHP), president 1951
- Beryl Elaine Jacka MBE, typist 1936; assistant general secretary 1945–52, secretary 1952–1976
- Gordon Colvin Lindesay Clark CMG

== See also ==
British

- North of England Institute of Mining and Mechanical Engineers (known as the Mining Institute) founded 1852
- Institution of Mining Engineers founded 1889, incorporating the Mining Institute above
- Institution of Mining and Metallurgy founded 1892
- Institute of Materials, Minerals and Mining merger of IMM and Institute of Materials in 2002.

US

- American Institute of Mining, Metallurgical, and Petroleum Engineers (originally American Institute of Mining Engineers founded 1871)
