= Institution of Mining and Metallurgy =

Former British research institution

The Institution of Mining and Metallurgy (IMM) was a British research institution, founded in 1892. Members of the Institution used the post-nominals MIMM.

In 2002, it merged with The Institute of Materials (IOM) to form the Institute of Materials, Minerals and Mining (IOM3 or IMMM)
