= Wavell Heights Presbyterian Church =

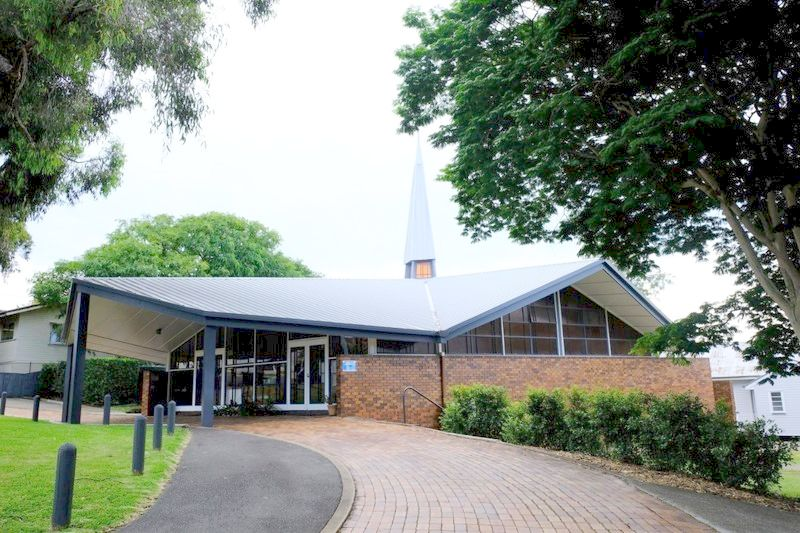
- Wavell Heights Presbyterian Church, 2021

- Location within Queensland
- 27.3923°S 153.0462°E
- Location: 64 Spence Road, Wavell Heights, City of Brisbane, Queensland, Australia

History
- Design period: 1940s–1960s (Post-WWII)
- Built: 1966

Site notes
- Architect: James William Gibson
- Architectural style: Modernism

Queensland Heritage Register
- Official name: Wavell Heights Presbyterian Church; St Luke’s Presbyterian Church
- Type: state heritage
- Designated: 9 September 2022
- Reference no.: 650270
- Type: Religion/worship: Church
- Theme: Creating social and cultural institutions: Worshipping and religious institutions

Wavell Heights Presbyterian Church is a heritage-listed church at 64 Spence Road, Wavell Heights, City of Brisbane, Queensland, Australia. It was designed by James William Gibson and built in 1966. It is also known as St Luke's Presbyterian Church. It was added to the Queensland Heritage Register on 9 September 2022.

== History ==
Wavell Heights Presbyterian Church (1966), in Wavell Heights, Brisbane, is a pentagonal brick church set within a church complex with mature trees. Built in a post-war suburb, the modernist-style church resulted from the Presbyterian Church's post-war building program, and its desire to remain relevant to contemporary society. Its plan, lighting, and furniture arrangement were designed to give the congregation a sense of community and involvement in the service, through gathered worship.

Wavell Heights, part of the traditional land of the Turrbal people, is located west of Sandgate Road, north of Kedron Brook. Prior to the 1940s, most of the area was characterised by dairy farming and pineapple growing, although by 1917 there were some residential subdivisions. The area was known as West Nundah until a public poll in July 1941 selected the name Wavell Heights, after the British General (later Field Marshall) Archibald Percival Wavell. Wavell Heights was formally christened at a concert at the Imperial Theatre in Nundah in October 1941. Other naming options had included "Beverley Heights" or 'Inala'. The suburb grew rapidly in the immediate post-World War II (WWII) era. Undeveloped land in Wavell Heights and neighbouring Chermside was acquired by the Queensland Housing Commission, on which by August 1947 it planned to build 450 houses. At the time, it was the commission's largest housing project, and it increased the population of Wavell Heights substantially. The Wavell Heights Neighbourhood Society was formed in 1947, and later established a community centre on Edinburgh Castle Road. A non-official post office opened on 4 December 1950 in the premises of Mr CB Grace at the corner of Rode Road and Pfingst Road. Three schools, including a high school, opened in the late 1940s and 1950s. The suburb possessed several churches established in the 1930s, including the Nundah Presbyterian Church (built 1932, as at 2022, known as the Gateway Presbyterian Church), West Nundah Methodist Church (built 1938, as at 2002 known as Wavell Heights Uniting Church), the Catholic Church of St Pascal Baylon (built 1937), and the Holy Spirit Anglican Church (1904–06 building relocated in 1936). Post-WWII growth resulted in a timber Presbyterian church hall being opened on Spence Road in 1952.

=== The Presbyterian Church and the site at Wavell Heights ===
The first Presbyterian congregation in Queensland had formed in 1849, and the first Presbyterian Church opened on Grey Street, South Brisbane, in 1851. Other Presbyterian churches opened in newly settled areas of Queensland, and in 1863 Queensland's Presbyterian congregations combined into a Synod and the Presbyterian Church of Queensland (PCQ) was formed. In 1865 three Presbyteries (covering multiple congregations) were formed: Brisbane (including Ipswich), Toowoomba (including Warwick), and Rockhampton (including Maryborough). The Presbytery of Maryborough was formed in 1870, Townsville in 1886, and Mackay in 1948. A union of Presbyterian Churches formed the Presbyterian Church of Australia in 1901. By 1954, the top four Christian denominations in the Metropolitan area of Brisbane were: the Church of England (34.33% of the population); followed by Catholic (24.35%); Presbyterian (10.74%); and Methodist (10.57%). Presbyterians also made up 11.7% of Queensland's population at this time. In 1977, the Uniting Church in Australia was formed from most members of the Presbyterian, Methodist and Congregational denominations, although a third of Presbyterian congregations remained in the Presbyterian Church of Australia.

Presbyterian congregations in Queensland were formed into charges, under a minister, and a charge could include one or more church congregations. Before a fully sanctioned charge was formed, "Home Mission" charges could be established by Home Missionaries. The expansion of Presbyterian charges in Queensland was mainly due to the Home Mission enterprise, which relied on missionaries and money sent from the Home Churches in Scotland and Ireland. The Nundah Charge, which later covered Wavell Heights, held its first service in January 1932, and was a fully sanctioned charge by the end of 1935.

The Spence Road site of the 1952 Presbyterian church was part of a 10-acre-3-perch (4.05 ha) undeveloped block that had been acquired by the PCQ for £4,500 in 1947. The site was originally intended to become an auxiliary hospital, connected to the planned St Andrews War Memorial Hospital in central Brisbane, but despite a cairn of remembrance being dedicated on the Wavell Heights site in September 1949, the auxiliary hospital did not proceed, and most of the land was subdivided for housing in 1972. The cairn of remembrance (not extant) was unveiled on 10 September 1949. The St Andrews War Memorial Hospital was eventually established in 1958 on the site previously occupied by Emmanuel College on Wickham Terrace, Spring Hill, which had relocated to the St Lucia campus of the University of Queensland in 1956.

The auxiliary hospital plan had included a church, hall, and manse (house for a Presbyterian minister) in the northeast corner of the site, and this aspect of the project did proceed. The first meeting to form a Presbyterian congregation at Wavell Heights, chaired by the Reverend RJE Martin (the Minister of the Nundah Charge since 1942) was called by the Nundah Presbyterian Session on 27 January 1949. The use of 1 acre (0.40 ha) of the hospital site for the Wavell Heights church buildings was later obtained from the Medical and Social Services Committee of the PCQ.

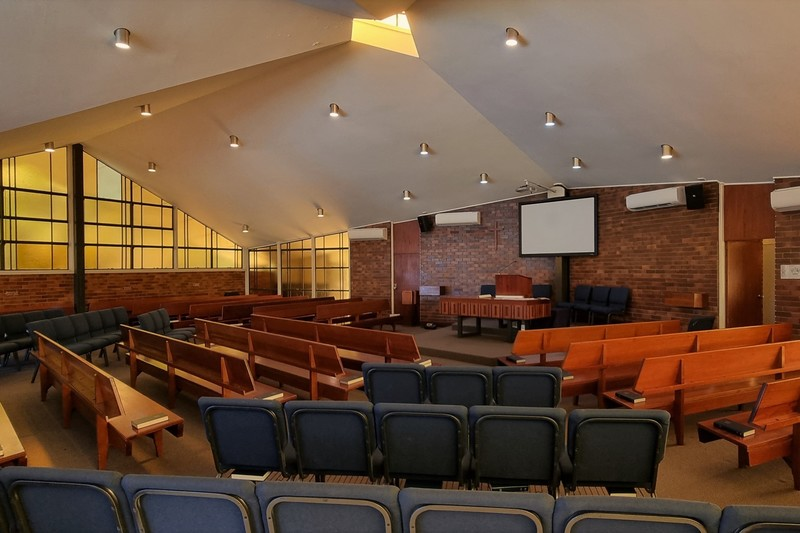
Church nave, looking south-west, 2021

=== The growth of Queensland's churches and the influence of Modernism, 1950s–60s ===
The decision to build a Presbyterian church at Wavell Heights was part of wider trends in Brisbane during the 1950s–60s. The 1950s were a prosperous time in Queensland, with low unemployment and a growing sense of optimism. There was also renewed religiosity across most denominations throughout Queensland. In addition, the population of metropolitan Brisbane grew by 36% between 1950 and 1960, and new housing estates and new suburbs developed. There was a rapid increase in housing density to the west, south, and east of the intended Wavell Heights hospital site between 1946 and 1951, and to the north by 1958. The number of Presbyterian communicants in Brisbane also increased by 54% between 1947 and 1961, from 5351 to 8247; while Presbyterian Sunday School enrolments more than doubled in the same period, from 4201 to 9155. Between 1961 and 1966, the number of adult Presbyterian communicants rose 18% while Sunday School attendance dropped 1.5%.

This increase in communicants was accompanied by a marked improvement in church finances. In Brisbane, the total income of Presbyterian parishes rose from £96,000 in 1954 to £230,000 in 1960. The financial position and building programme of the Wavell Heights congregation during the 1950s was assisted by the principle of "stewardship", or regular donations by churchgoers and the PCQ had set up its own Committee on Stewardship by the late 1950s. It was stated during the Wavell Heights Presbyterian Church's Church Progress Campaign that "Christian stewardship is the practice of the Christian religion, namely, systematic and proportionate giving of time, talents and material possessions, based on the conviction that they are a trust from God". In 1955, the American-based fund-raising firm, the Wells Organisation, had extended its operations to Queensland, with "planned giving" and "stewardship" being the new catchwords.

The growth in Brisbane's population, church attendance, and improved church finances resulted in the construction of new churches in the 1950s and early 1960s. In 1950 it was reported that "as Brisbane continues to expand rapidly in all directions, more churches, halls and Sunday schools are being built or planned to cope with the growing population", and that a £1,000,000 building programme was planned by Brisbane religious denominations. Planned Presbyterian buildings included church halls at Alderley, Holland Park, Wavell Heights, Seven Hills, with a kindergarten hall at Kalinga. A new brick church at Coorparoo was well advanced and tenders had been called for a new brick church at South Brisbane. During the post-war years (1945–1977) over 1350 church-buildings were built in Queensland, with over 366 built from 1955 to 1959. By the late 1950s, ambitious building programmes were resulting in new churches, halls, and houses for ministers in new suburbs, while older timber churches in established suburbs were replaced with brick churches. During the 1950s at least 178 new church buildings opened in Brisbane, followed by at least 160 in the 1960s. The rate of church construction in Brisbane declined after 1964, along with membership in Christian churches. Of the new 1950s church buildings, 34 were Church of England (now Anglican), 33 Catholic, 24 Methodist, 24 Presbyterian, and at least 63 by the other denominations. Of the 1960s buildings, 26 were Church of England (now Anglican), 45 Catholic, 13 Methodist, 20 Presbyterian and at least 63 by the other denominations.

The 1950s was also a period of substantial change within Christian denominations throughout Australia, as they sought to remain relevant to modern society. Coupled with their expansionary building program, this led to a radical departure from established architectural traditions. Reflecting international trends, church designs moved away from historical revival styles and became increasingly influenced by modernism. Modernism had emerged as a movement in architecture in Europe in the 1920s and would become the most important new style or philosophy of architecture and design in the 20th century. It embraced the ideals of functionalism, new technologies and the rejection of ornament in an endeavour to create new and appropriate architectural solutions that reflected the social conditions of the time. In Queensland, modernist ideas had begun to be adopted for ecclesiastical architecture in the late 1930s and early 1940s, including the Shepherd Memorial Church of St Peter, Proston (1937), the Second Church of Christ, Scientist, Clayfield (1938), and the First Church of Christ, Scientist, Brisbane (1940). However, it was still expected that a church would be recognisable as such, resulting in a wide range of variations combining traditional church elements, symbols, and functions with new construction techniques, materials, and forms. As the 1950s progressed, traditional church building forms adopted further Modernist features, such as modern brick and metal details, and shallower roof pitches, while retaining traditional spaces, configurations, and motifs. These trends continued into the 1960s, with new roof forms and plan shapes.

=== The Presbyterian building program at Wavell Heights ===
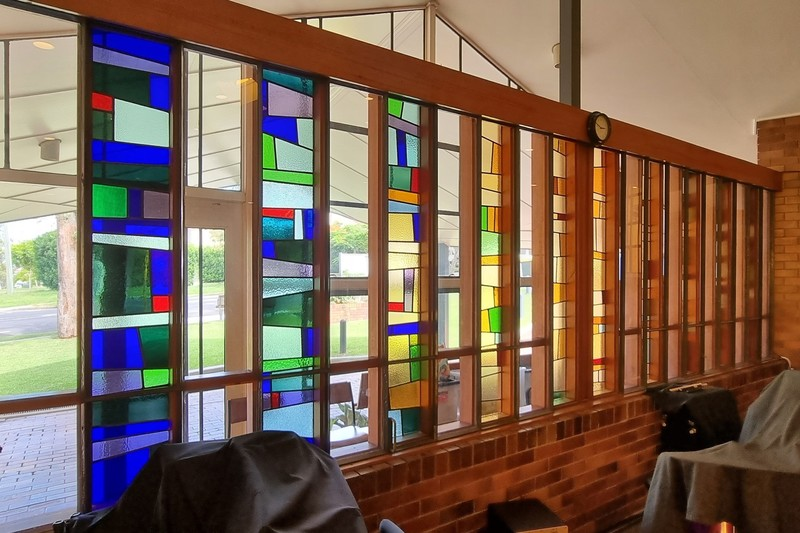
Sliding coloured glass panels between choir and front porch, looking south-east, 2021

The Wavell Heights congregation did not immediately commission a Modernist brick church. The first building erected on their land facing Spence Road was a timber "church hall" (church). The stump-capping ceremony was held on 5 May 1951, but due to building delays the first service was not held until 11 May 1952, and the church hall was officially opened and dedicated on 31 August 1952. The Sunday School which was established in the church hall in June 1952 proved popular, and a second timber building, a Kindergarten (Junior Sunday School) hall, was constructed behind the church hall, with volunteer labour from the congregation, and dedicated on 18 March 1956. By 1957, there were 341 children in the Sunday School, with a teaching staff of 31, and around 200 families were affiliated with the church. Wavell Heights soon became its own fully sanctioned charge, St Luke's Wavell Heights Presbyterian Church, in October 1959, with its own minister.

Further church buildings were added. A manse was completed, on a separate lot south of the church hall, in October 1959. The manse was designed by local architect Ray Smith, who in March 1957 had been appointed "Advising Architect" to the Wavell Heights Presbyterian Church. The 1959 manse was sold in 1989, with the proceeds used to erect a new manse/caretaker's residence (extant by 1991) on the south-west corner of the church site with rear access from Silene Street. This was until recently occupied by the former minister and his family, with the parish vacant in 2021.

A new brick church followed in the 1960s, although construction was delayed due to issues of design and budget, and changes of architect. Sketch plans for a multi-purpose building were presented in October 1961 by Ray Smith, with an estimate of £18,000. The proposed building included 12 classrooms for Sunday School as part of main auditorium, with part height, swing-up screens. The building was to have a steel portal frame with a 54 ft (16.5m) span, timber-framed walls, a terracotta tile roof, and a glazed front gable. This idea had been abandoned by September 1962. Smith was then asked to design a new church building, with a budget of £20,000, and plans for a brick building with two levels were submitted in November 1962 with an estimate of £22,000. This building was to have brick walls and a terracotta tile hipped roof, a vehicle driveway under a roofed portico, a central entrance porch and central aisle, and a church office and minister's vestry either side of the entrance. The front side wings would contain a choir assembly room (with steps up to the choir balcony above the main entrance) and a nursery, while the rear side wings would contain the Committee room, film room, and minister and elders' assembly room. The basement would contain meeting rooms, toilets and a kitchen. Tenders for this closed on 20 December 1963, with the lowest being £36,621. A new design was consequently sought, and the firm of Cross and Bain was appointed on 4 November 1964, with Jim Gibson, who had joined the firm in 1956, nominated as project architect.

=== James Gibson, church design, and the renewal of worship practices ===
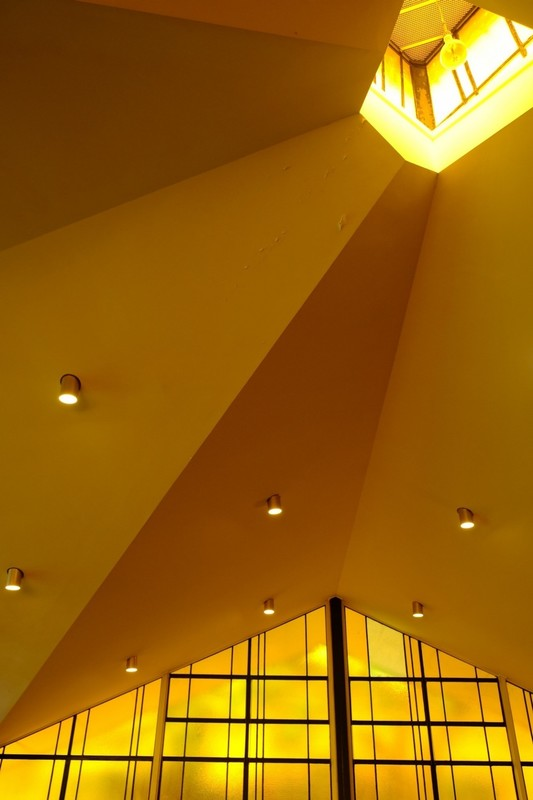
Ceiling of nave, including roof lantern, 2021

James (Jim) William Gibson (1932–2018) was born in Tenterfield, New South Wales and was living in Brisbane from a young age. Gibson studied at the Central Technical College and the School of Architecture of the University of Queensland from 1951 to 1956, graduating with Diploma in Architecture. He commenced full-time work with Des Searl (Searl and Tannett, Architects) in 1951, and then Cross and Bain in 1956, before joining Goodsir Baker Wilde Architects in 1978.

While working for Cross and Bain, Gibson designed almost 20 Queensland church buildings (plus other unbuilt schemes) between 1957 and 1977. These were mainly in Brisbane, for the Presbyterians, Church of England and Methodists. Gibson-designed church buildings have included: Holland Park, St Matthew's Anglican Church (1958), Indooroopilly Presbyterian Church redevelopment (1960), Toowong Presbyterian (Uniting) Church (1960), Ashgrove Methodist (Uniting) Church (1962), St Paul's Anglican Church in Manly (1964), Stafford Presbyterian (Uniting) Church (1966), Wavell Heights Presbyterian Church (1966), Knox Presbyterian (Uniting) Church in Moorooka (1968), Bundaberg Uniting Christian Education Centre (1968), Pope Street Methodist (Uniting) Church in Yeronga (1970), Wellers Hill Presbyterian Church in Tarragindi (1970), Aspley Presbyterian (Uniting) Church, Tamborine Presbyterian Church (1975), Strathpine Presbyterian Church (1976), Indooroopilly Uniting Church (1976), St Stephen's Presbyterian Church Ipswich (vestries) (1977), Chermside West Presbyterian Church (Maundrell Terrace), Inala Uniting Church (church extension to existing hall), and Oakleigh Church of the Nazarene. An inaugural member of the Queensland Presbyterian Assembly Architectural Committee (1963–77), and its convenor for much of this time, Gibson advocated changes to church design within Queensland's Presbyterian and Methodist churches. He was also well known within both churches, attending and speaking at events, and was involved in merger discussions prior to the formation of the Uniting Church of Australia in 1977, even designing the logo for the new organisation. In 1977 he became a member of the Uniting Church Architectural Advisory Panel.

In 1967, he prepared the book "Except the LORD Build", a manual of building for Presbyterian congregations for the Australian Presbyterian Church. Gibson's manual was approved by the General Assembly of the Presbyterian Church of Queensland in May 1967. For his manual, Gibson referenced various publications from Great Britain and the United States, and also obtained information about various Presbyterian church exemplars being constructed interstate. Through this manual it was hoped that "the community may realise that the design of Presbyterian buildings is motivated by Christian purpose and that Presbyterian places of worship and activity stand as silent witness to the faith we profess". It stated that the design of a church should be based on how the congregation worshipped, and their preferred locational arrangement of the choir and furnishings (font, pulpit, communion table, pews), rather than adopting traditional church forms (i.e., a rectangular nave), and trying to insert all the functions of worship. The manual also asserted that a church should utilise modern materials, methods of construction, and design techniques, "simple in concept but capable of having an impact on the community".

Gibson also believed that the interior design of a church should reflect 20th century reformist principles and worship practices, and he adopted contemporary ideas for gathered worship spaces, with the congregation closer to the minister than in traditional church plans. The aims of the liturgical renewal movement in the Catholic Church, which promoted a closer relationship between clergy and laity, and more congregational involvement in the liturgy (ritual of public worship), were largely implemented at the Second Ecumenical Council of the Vatican (Vatican II) of the Catholic Church (final session 1965), and had an effect on Catholic Church architecture; while reformist principles were also reflected in the changing architecture of Protestant churches. Vatican II soon led to the construction of Queensland Catholic churches which "had both a gathered plan and the altar positioned in such a way that the priest could face the congregation". Daunt categorises St Luke's in Wavell Heights as an example of a church design "embracing liturgical renewal" (liturgy refers to the rites prescribed for public worship).

To facilitate gathered worship, the 1967 book advocated Presbyterian church designs with no barriers between the minister and congregation, and that people should also be involved in the service and "close to the centre of the action", no further than "five or six pews" from the minister. As the Sacraments were of equal importance to the Word, the communion table and pulpit should also be close together, with the font nearby, while the choir and organ should be closer to the congregation, such as near the entrance. Gibson believed that once an internal arrangement of furniture which enabled the congregation to be more involved and closer to the minister was decided, then new external shapes for churches could emerge, with more equal (less rectangular) dimensions.

The design of the new church at Wavell Heights, besides being illustrated in "Except the LORD Build", closely followed the principles Gibson promoted, and reflected the progression of his designs. It successfully combined a number of his ideas, including adapting international designs for the local climate, and his approach to contemporary church design and worship practices, such as concepts of gathered worship, equality of the Sacraments and Word, and association of the choir with the congregation.

In 1965 Cross and Bain's design by Gibson was approved, working drawings prepared, and tenders called. The lowest tender of £15,488 ($30,976), from Macquarie Constructions, was accepted. The second lowest tender was from Thomas & Provan Pty Ltd at £18,300, while the highest of the 14 tenders received was £24,986. The congregation needed to have ownership of the land it had occupied since 1952, in order to provide security for the bank loan. The current church site of 3 roods 5.6 perches (3,177m2) was eventually granted to Wavell Heights Presbyterian Church by St Andrews War Memorial Hospital in December 1965, although the new title (1966) remained in the name of the PCQ. Construction commenced in early 1966, but work halted when the builder ran into financial difficulties and a liquidator was appointed on 5 April. On 6 May 1966, the second lowest tenderer, Thomas & Provan, was awarded the contract to complete the building, for $32,990 (in February 1966, Australian currency changed from pounds to dollars, at the conversion rate of $2 per £1). To make room for the new church, the 1952 church hall was relocated northwards and its understorey enclosed with brick, to provide accommodation for the Sunday School Kindergarten, while the 1956 Kindergarten hall remained in its original location. A kitchen was added to the west side of the Kindergarten hall, later called the Fellowship (youth) Hall, between 1969 and 1974.

The new church, a one-storey structure, was set back from the street, aligning with its neighbouring residences, which reflected a shift in suburban church architecture in Queensland towards designing buildings that were more similar to residences in materials and scale. In accordance with the principles of renewed worship practices, the building's pentagonal plan was topped with a folded roof and ceiling to create an inclusive worship space. The rows of pews were set to either side of the sanctuary, rather than directly in front of it. A narrow spire with a skylight at its base was placed centrally over the baptismal font, which was positioned in the centre of the nave, between the sets of pews. Careful attention was paid to natural and artificial light so that more prominence was not given to the sanctuary rather than the congregation that gathered around it. Glazing consisted of deep amber glass set in black steel window frames, and the organ and choir were located opposite the sanctuary and adjacent to an enclosed entrance porch, separated from it by a screen of random-patterned, coloured glass. The pulpit and the communion table were placed side by side, on a common marble base, to reflect their equality within Presbyterian worship. The church also had a Phillips Church Hearing Aid System, with an antenna in the ceiling broadcasting the service to hearing aids, or transistor receivers. A vestry, special committee rooms and a flower room were located at the rear of the church. The red cedar (Toona ciliata var. australis) furniture was custom-designed by Gibson and made in nearby Northgate by Maunsell's.

=== The evolution of Presbyterian ecclesiastical architecture in post-WWII Queensland ===
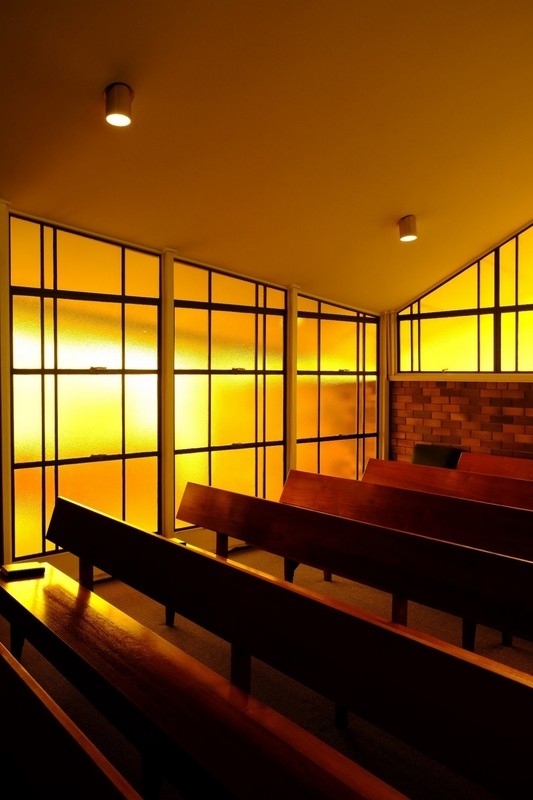
North-west corner of nave, 2021

A number of plan shapes were used in the 1960s by church designers to facilitate renewed worship practices and particularly to create a sense of gathered worship. As an example of this evolution in plan shapes, Wavell Heights Presbyterian Church marked a distinct shift in Presbyterian Church design. More than 40 churches were opened by the PCQ between 1950 and 1977, when the Uniting Church was formed. Of these, 16 were opened in the 1950s, 22 in the 1960s, and only 3 opened in the 1970s. Those from the 1950s typically had historical architecture with some modern influences (Coorparoo Presbyterian Church, 1951) with further simplifying of historical features in the second half of the decade as demonstrated by Roma Presbyterian Church (1955). Churches like Wynnum Presbyterian Church (1959) marked a change to churches becoming modern in styling; however, they retained their traditional spaces, configurations and motifs in simplified forms, and this trend continued in to the 1960s with other examples like Stanthorpe Presbyterian Church (1963) and Holland Park Presbyterian Church (1965). Other Presbyterian churches in the 1960s experimented with more distinctive and modern forms, e.g. St Andrew's Presbyterian Memorial Church in Innisfail (1960) and St Andrews Presbyterian Church in Mount Isa (1960). Wavell Heights Presbyterian Church (opened 19 November 1966) and Stafford Presbyterian Church (opened 1 October 1966) marked another change in Presbyterian Church architecture, being the first two Presbyterian churches in Queensland to include broad naves with seating gathered closer to the minister in response to renewal of worship practices. The church at Stafford included seating on three sides of the minister. However, the architecture of Stafford Presbyterian Church was simpler than at Wavell Heights; it had a square plan form without features like large windows of coloured glass or a folded roof form, and it also did not receive the same degree of publication in the periodical Australian Presbyterian Life. These concepts of responding to renewed worship practices were further developed throughout the remainder of the 1960s, e.g. Kenmore Uniting Church (1968); St George Presbyterian Church, (2968) and into the 1970s e.g. Weller's Hill Presbyterian Church (1970).

=== The new church at Wavell Heights ===
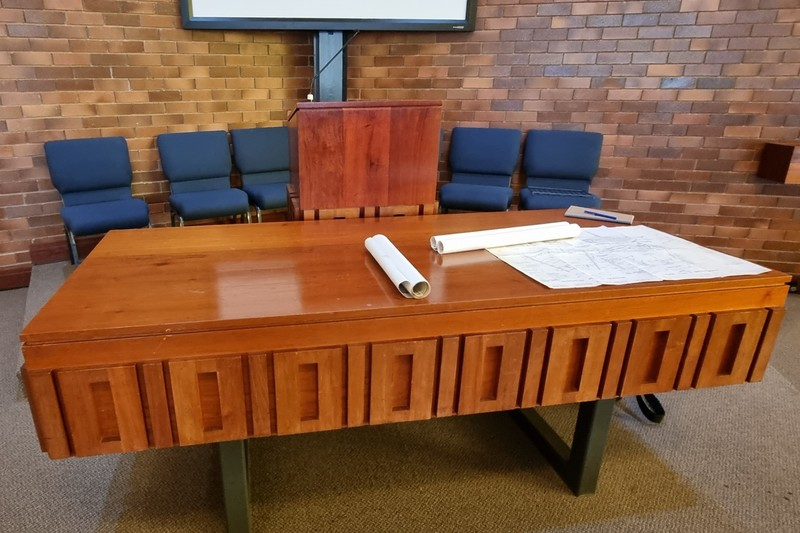
Original communion table and pulpit, on replacement metal base, 2021

Construction was completed early in November 1966 and the new church was dedicated on the afternoon of Saturday 19 November, while the interior furnishings were dedicated the following morning. It was reported that a "five-sided church whose unusual features do not end with its exterior appearance had its two-stage blessing completed yesterday morning". Notable features included the proximity of the congregation to the pulpit and communion table, with no single person "more than five seats away" from either (there were four blocks of six rows of pews), and the church's feeling of "togetherness" and its family atmosphere. The interior was "bathed in a golden light, from amber panes of glass", and the red cedar furnishings "were chosen to augment the effect".

The church was built and furnished for approximately $55,000 ($36,000 plus furniture), the majority of the cost met by a £20,000 ($40,000) loan from the Bank of NSW, which was eventually repaid from congregational offerings.

The new church received three mentions in Australian Presbyterian Life in 1966–7. In June 1967, the periodical noted: 'all commented favourably on the "gathered around" seating arrangement [...] to conduct worship in this building, or to be one of the other worshippers in the service, is to begin to understand what it is to belong in a community - the beloved community of Christ's people.'

In 2022, only minor changes have been made to the church since its completion. These have included the addition of air-conditioning, the addition of aluminium-framed glazed doors between the porch and nave to facilitate this, and replacement of original carpet with new carpet. In 2020, a new freestanding universal access toilet was added at the southwest corner of the church, replacing a pergola. Stormwater pits were removed from the southern side of the building, replaced by a new full-width concrete path laid in 2015. In 2013 the marble-clad base of the font was replaced with timber, and made portable, and in 2020 the marble-clad common base of the pulpit and communion table was replaced with separate steel frames, although the pulpit and table remain adjacent. Some of the original timber pews have been removed for storage in the 1952 church.

In 2022 Wavell Heights Presbyterian Church has remained in continuous use for its original purpose as a place of worship, and as a venue for baptisms, weddings and funerals, with the construction cost of the church long since repaid by weekly offerings from the congregation. A Korean Presbyterian Church, the Brisbane Logos Mission Church, also worships in the 1966 church.

== Description ==
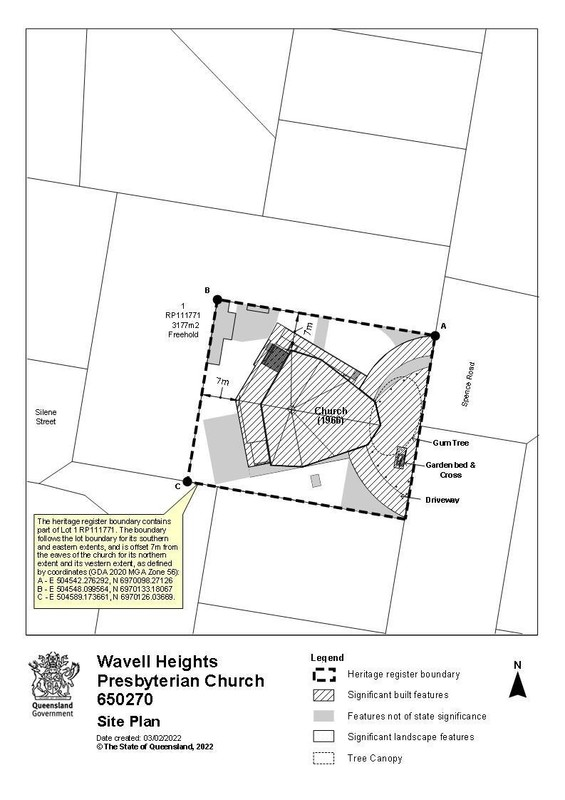
Site plan, 2022

Wavell Heights Presbyterian Church (1966) is situated in the suburb of Wavell Heights about 10 kilometres (6.2 mi) north of the Brisbane CBD. The church stands facing (east) to Spence Road set back from the road behind an open yard, a hall is located to its north (1952) and another hall to its west (1956). Both halls are not of state-level cultural heritage significance.

Designed in a bold Modernist architectural style, the church is highly intact. The church is a single storey slab-on-ground building with a symmetrical pentagonal plan form. It has a low, folded metal-clad roof form with a tall, narrow spire at its centre. The roof appears to float above the low face brick walls of the church, the opening between wall and roof filled with glazing. The roof line extends over a crescent driveway sheltering the main entrance and forming a porte-cochère.

The entry of the church features a floor to ceiling glazed wall with two large double doors. Brick paving matching the colouring of the church's walls continues from the driveway and into the entry porch. The porch is divided from the nave of the church by a wide screen of coloured leadlight glazing with an entry to the nave either side. Inside, the nave is broad and modest in scale, its ceiling is pale and folded with a skylight lantern at its centre, the base of the spire. a choir alcove is nested at the centre of the eastern end of the nave and carpeted aisles lead to a raised sanctuary at the far (western) end with seating areas either side of these. All glazing to the nave is amber coloured and fills the space with golden light, the lantern at the centre of the ceiling also casts a spotlight. A door either side of the rear wall of the nave open to separate rear rooms, he committee room (south) and vestry and flower room (north). The south-western and north-western corners of the building both have small courtyards sheltered by timber pergolas.

The church retains many of its original fittings and furnishings including original red cedar joinery (pews, planter boxes, and cabinets), downlights and pendant lights. Although slightly altered, the original pulpit, communion table, baptismal font (all removed from their fixed bases), hymn book cupboard (umbrella stand removed), and memorial and notice board (notice board side shortened) remain in the church.

The church is very intact with only minor alterations and additions including: the addition of a toilet to the southwest courtyard, addition of aluminium frame doors between the lobby and nave and new floor finishes to the nave, vestry and committee room.

== Heritage listing ==
Wavell Heights Presbyterian Church was listed on the Queensland Heritage Register on 9 September 2022 having satisfied the following criteria.

The place is important in demonstrating the evolution or pattern of Queensland's history.

Wavell Heights Presbyterian Church (1966), a highly intact Modernist-style church in a suburban setting, is important in demonstrating the evolution of Presbyterian Church architecture in Queensland during the post-World War II (WWII) period. By the late 1960s, Presbyterian Church architecture in Queensland featured cohesive design responses to the renewal of worship practices. The place is one of the earliest products of this movement and a good representative example of these design responses, as demonstrated in its built form, detailing, and layout.

The place is important in demonstrating the principal characteristics of a particular class of cultural places.

Wavell Heights Presbyterian Church is important in demonstrating the principal characteristics of a post-WWII Modernist church in Queensland. Architect-designed and highly intact, this importance is evident in its: all-encompassing and unified Modernist aesthetic; restrained materials palette; traditional Christian spaces (nave, sanctuary, lobby), and motifs (coloured and leadlight glass, steeple) presented in non-traditional forms and layouts (low, folded roof form; pentagonal plan form; and broad, modestly-scaled nave with gathered layout); and original furniture (red cedar pews, pulpit, communion table, hymn book cupboards, and noticeboard).

The place is important because of its aesthetic significance.

Retaining a high degree of intactness and integrity, Wavell Heights Presbyterian Church has aesthetic significance for its beautiful and expressive attributes, which are derived from its architectural design qualities. These attributes express renewed worship practices of the Presbyterian Church and include an all-encompassing and cohesive Modernist style; distinctive form; scale sympathetic to a suburban setting; symmetry; restrained materials palette; minimal use of decoration; and manipulation of light with amber coloured glass illuminating the nave, the roof lantern permitting a central light from above, and placement of artificial lighting.

The place has a special association with the life or work of a particular person, group or organisation of importance in Queensland's history.

Architect James (Jim) William Gibson (1932–2018) is a person of importance in Queensland's history. As a key advocate for the incorporation of the renewal of worship practices into Protestant church designs, Gibson had a notable role in the evolution of post-WWII Modernist church design in Queensland.

Wavell Heights Presbyterian Church has a special association with Gibson, as its built form, detailing, and layout represents the culmination of his ideas and, as a result, the place is an important example of the architectural principles he advocated.
