= QHC =

QHC means Honorary Chaplain to the Queen.

QHC may also stand for:

- Queensland Housing Commission
- Quorum Health Corporation
