= Marianne Helena Brydon =

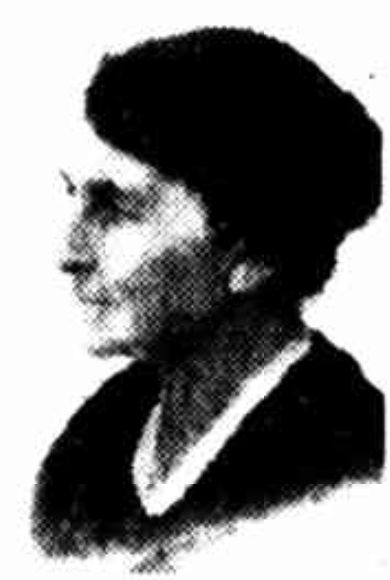
Marianne Helena Brydon (1864-1941), Queensland educationist and former Inspector of Women's Work, Department of Public Instruction.

Marianne Helena Brydon (née Carson) (1864–1941) was a domestic science teacher in Queensland, Australia. She raised the status and availability of domestic science as a subject in Queensland schools.

== Early life ==
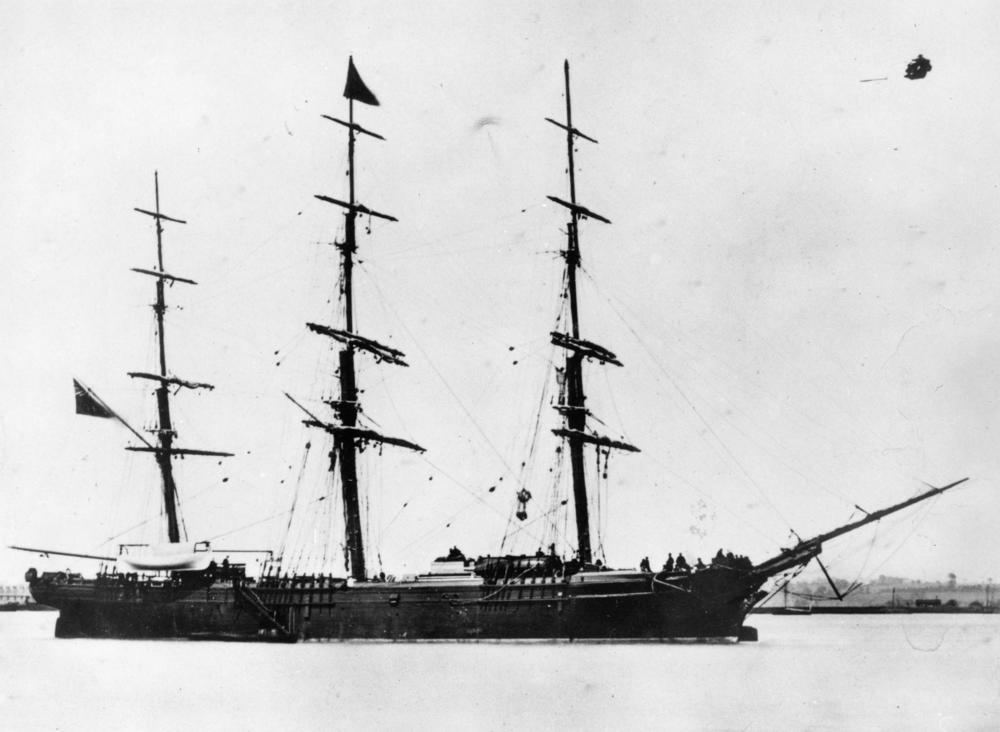
Young Australia

Marianna Helena Carson was born on 19 May 1864 at Tynan, Armagh, Ireland, the daughter of Presbyterian minister, James Carson and his wife Marianna (née Coey). The family immigrated to Queensland, leaving London on the Young Australia on 25 April 1868 and arriving in Brisbane on 1 August 1868. James Carson preached for the first time in Australia on 11 August 1868 at the Wickham Terrace Presbyterian Church. In December 1868 James Carson was appointed to the Presbyterian Church in Rockhampton.

Carson won the Fairfax Prizes for the Sydney University junior and senior public examinations in 1879 and 1881, respectively.

== Professional life ==
Carson commenced her career as a teacher on the staff of the Brisbane Grammar School. On 2 April 1885, she married John Mackenzie Brydon at Eldersfield, Old Cleveland Road, in Brisbane.

Ten years after her marriage, the death of her husband on 13 July 1895 obliged Brydon to return to educational work, and in 1895 she opened the South Brisbane High School and Kindergarten. In 1904, Brydon was appointed principal of the South Brisbane Technical College and High School, and five years later she was appointed supervisor of the day school In the Brisbane Central Technical College, formed by the amalgamation of the Brisbane and South Brisbane Technical Colleges. In 1919 she became an inspector of women's work for the Department of Public Instruction.

Brydon has travelled extensively throughout Queensland on behalf of the Department of Public Instruction. She was a role model to other teachers including Harriet Elizabeth Marks who was a graduate of the University of Queensland.

== Community service ==
Brydon was for many years the honorary treasurer for the Standing Committee of the Women's College, within the University of Queensland, and she was also a member of the committee of the Brisbane School of Arts from 1911 to 1927.

During the early part of this year she devoted much time and thought to the equipment and maintenance of the Housecraft Training School for unemployed girls on Gregory Terrace.

== Personal life ==
Two of Brydon's sons saw active service in World War I, the elder, who held a commission in the engineers, being killed in Flanders, while the younger, who was an officer in the 49th battalion, was twice wounded before his return to Australia. Of her two married daughters, Mrs Wawn and Mrs P. R. T. Wills, the former also saw active service, and received the Royal Red Cross at Salonika.

Brydon, with her third daughter, Minnie Brydon took a holiday trip to England and Canada in 1928.

Brydon died on 17 November 1941 at Brisbane. She was cremated at Mount Thompson Crematorium on 18 November 1941.
