= Wavell State High School buildings =

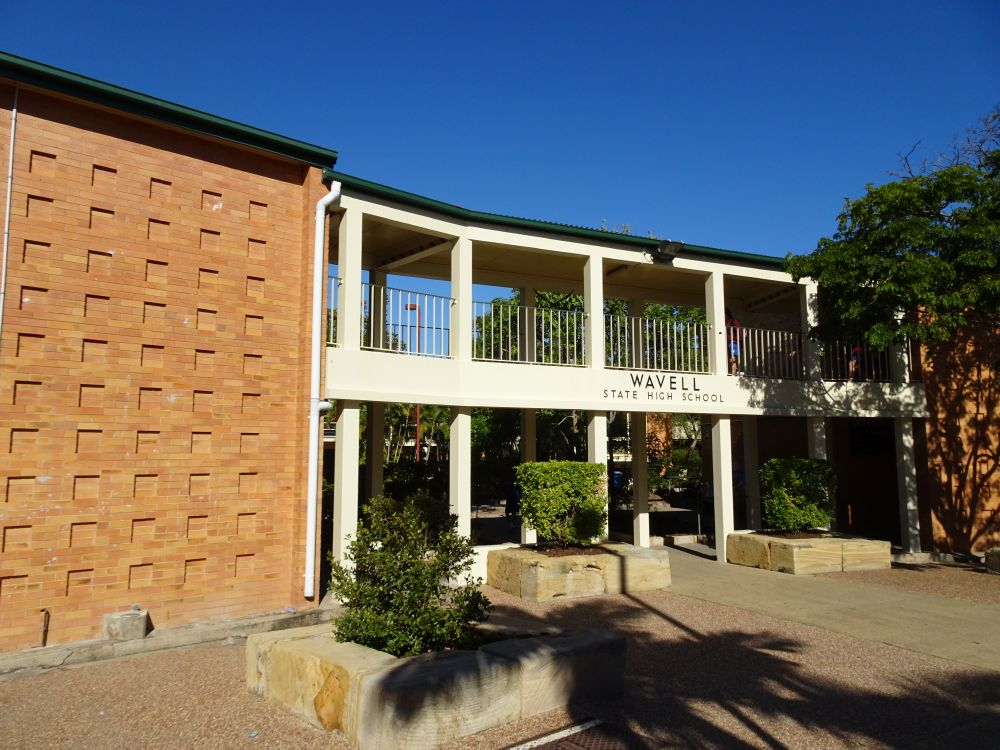
- Entrance, 2018

- Location within Queensland
- 27.3998°S 153.0372°E
- Location: Telopia Avenue, Wavell Heights, City of Brisbane, Queensland, Australia

History
- Design period: 1940s–1960s (Post-WWII)
- Built: 1959–1966

Site notes
- Architect: Department of Public Works (Queensland)
- Architectural style: Modernism

Queensland Heritage Register
- Official name: Wavell State High School
- Type: state heritage
- Designated: 27 July 2018
- Reference no.: 650067
- Type: Education, Research, Scientific Facility: School – state (high)
- Theme: Educating Queenslanders: Providing secondary education

Wavell State High School buildings are a group of heritage-listed school buildings at Wavell State High School, Telopia Avenue, Wavell Heights, City of Brisbane, Queensland, Australia. They were designed by Department of Public Works (Queensland) and built from 1959 to 1966. They were added to the Queensland Heritage Register on 27 July 2018.

== History ==
Wavell State High School opened in 1959, on its current site at 70 Telopia Avenue, Wavell Heights, about 7.8 kilometres (4.8 mi) north of the Brisbane CBD. The school is important in demonstrating the evolution of state education and its associated architecture. It retains:

- an administration building (Block A 1960, F/T7)
- seven classroom buildings (Block C, D, G, and H 1960, F/T7, and Block J 1961, Block E and F 1966, F/T8)
- covered links (1960–66) set in landscaped grounds
- playing field (1964).

The school has a strong and ongoing association with the Wavell Heights community.

Wavell Heights was part of the traditional land of the Turrbul speaking people. The area, first known as West Nundah, was characterised by dairy farming and pineapple growing. By the 1920s a portion of the farming land close to Sandgate Road had been subdivided into small lots intended for residential development. Encouraged by its relatively close proximity to the Nundah railway station, which was approximately a 1-kilometre (0.62 mi) walk away, many new houses were built in the interwar period. A great deal of the area, however, remained farmland.

By the early 1930s an active progress association had been established in the district. In the early 1940s the association lobbied to have the suburb officially defined and to have the name changed. Through a series of public meetings, several suggestions were made, including Beverley Heights, Avon Hill, Inala, and Wavell Heights. A poll was taken and Wavell Heights proved to be the most popular. With the Lord Mayor's and the postal authority's approval, the name of the area was officially adopted in 1941. The new suburb's namesake was British Field Marshall Archibald Percival Wavell, who at the time was the Commander-in-Chief of the Imperial forces fighting in the Middle East, North Africa, Greece, and Crete. Later in World War II (WWII) he served as Commander-in-Chief of India.

In the immediate post-WWII era some of the undeveloped land in Wavell Heights and Chermside was acquired by the Queensland Housing Commission. This was a time when Queensland was experiencing a major population increase resulting in a severe housing shortage. It is believed that up to 100,000 Queenslanders lived in temporary housing between 1946 and 1960. In 1947, the Housing Minister, Bill Power, acknowledged this need for housing and assured that the Queensland Government was building houses as quickly as possible. Priority for new houses was given to those living in tents or huts, then for families forced to live apart due to the housing shortage, and finally to those who were sharing accommodation with others.

In August 1947, the Queensland Housing Commission was planning to spend £500,000 on a housing project for Wavell Heights; 450 houses were to be constructed on the 100 acres (40 ha) site situated between Gympie Road, Rode Road and Hamilton Road. At the time, it was deemed to be the Commission's largest housing project. Following contemporary town-planning principles, the housing project was to be undertaken with the cooperation of the Department of Public Instruction and the Brisbane City Council, who would be essential partners in delivering services and infrastructure, including schools, "features of the scheme were reservations for a shopping centre, parks, sports ground, state school, and child welfare centre". Once constructed, the houses were swiftly tenanted. The population of Wavell Heights increased substantially with an estimated 2,000 people moving into the area.

The Department of Public Instruction delivered on its promise to build schools in the area with the Wavell Heights State School being opened by 1950. Closely following this, a Catholic primary school was also built in Wavell Heights. It was quickly apparent, however, that a high school would be needed for the area.

The Queensland Government was slow to establish state secondary education, considering this to be of little relevance to Queensland's primary industry-based economy. The Grammar Schools Act 1860 provided scholarships for high-achieving students to attend elite grammar schools, although few were awarded. It was not until 1912 that the government instituted a high school system, whereby separate high schools were established in major towns or, where the student population was too small, a primary school was expanded to include a "high top". High tops were an economical measure that provided essentially the same education while utilising already established facilities. In Queensland generally, high schools remained few in number until after WWII when secondary education was generally accepted as essential and was more widely provided for.

The first high schools were established within existing technical colleges, utilising their buildings. The first purpose-built high school buildings were constructed in 1917 and were large, elaborate buildings that were variations of a standard design introduced in 1914 (C/T8) as well as vocational buildings built to standard designs. In the 1950s the number of high schools in Queensland increased significantly. The grounds were large, greater than 12 acres (4.9 ha) providing ample room for sports facilities. From their introduction, the design of high school buildings was the responsibility of the Department of Public Works (DPW). The general classroom buildings were the same standard types as used for primary schools but those for high schools included rooms with minor alterations for science laboratories, domestic science classes, workshops for woodwork and metal work, and libraries. The buildings were designed to reflect educationalists' modern requirements, favouring "lighter, loosely grouped, flexible" buildings.

Also, there was a focus on the fit between the school and its neighbourhood, as well as site planning for expansion and ideal solar orientation. Educationalists argued that the ideal orientation of classroom buildings was ten degrees east of north, with verandahs protecting the northern side and classrooms facing south. This led to the construction of school buildings that were oriented in relation to the sun rather than the site boundaries. New school buildings were constructed using modern materials and featured modern colours.

In the early 1950s, architects developed master-planning concepts that influenced the design and layout of the whole school. Initially, these plans were broadly based on regular and symmetrical plan forms around a central or prominent axis. This concept was replaced a few years later by architects planning for growth and change. There was a shift away from grid-like layouts to nuclear plans, centred on a reception building with classroom wings connected to and fanning away from the nucleus. The primary focus was the ideal solar orientation of buildings. Interest was also shown in developing schemes that related to the natural contours and existing vegetation. The long, narrow buildings were positioned so that the spaces captured between them were triangular, opening out into the landscape.

It was in this period the Department of Education acquired just over 21 acres (8.5 ha) of land in an elevated and undeveloped area of Wavell Heights. In September 1958 the Director-General of Education announced that the Executive Council had approved the construction of six new high schools for Queensland, which included Wavell State High School. The Courier Mail reported in September 1958 that "sufficient accommodation was expected to be ready at the new Wavell State High School for classes to start on January 27 next ... the school, in Edinburgh Castle Road, would have academic, commercial and industrial courses".

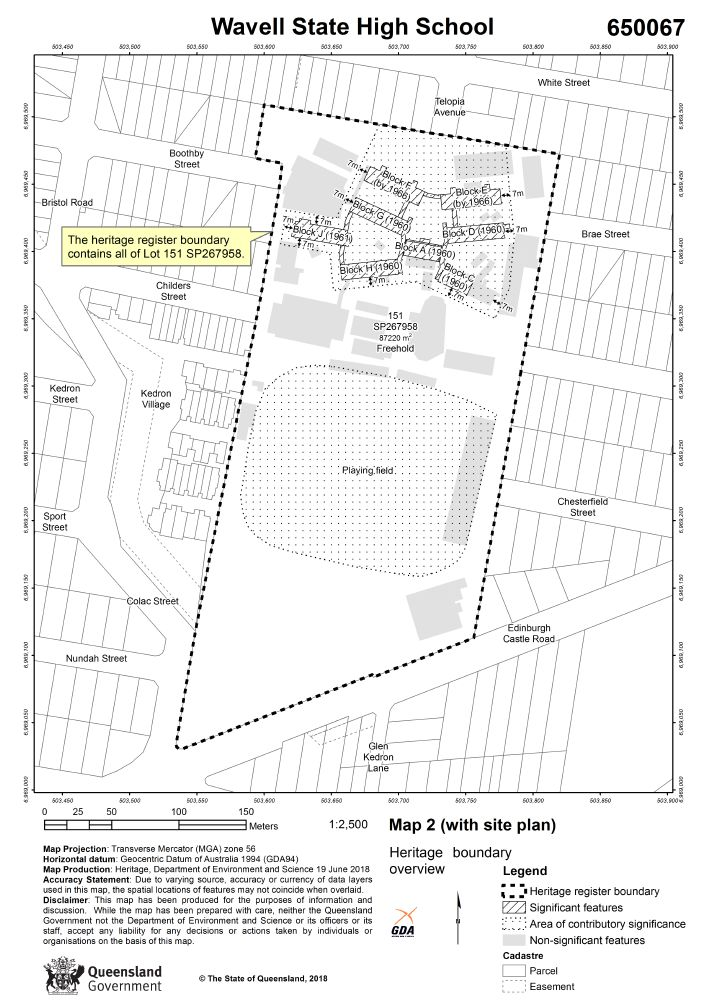
School map, 2018

At Wavell Heights, the DPW produced a site master plan for a central core of buildings and playing field. The buildings were laid out symmetrically on an axis from Telopia Avenue at the northern high ground and the playing field was at the southern low ground. Entrance gates were at the surrounding residential streets with vehicle entrance across the northern high ground. The plan comprised a central administration building with four classroom buildings radiating out from it. The buildings had north facing verandahs and south facing classrooms, connected to the administration building by covered links.

In November 1958 construction work began on the first building on the site, the Manual Training Building (Block B). The school was scheduled to receive its first students at the beginning of 1959, however, Block B was not complete by then. To address this, a timber school building was moved from Oakleigh State School to Wavell State High School. Considered a temporary structure on the site, it consisted of three classrooms and an office. All were occupied by the end of January 1959. Initially, there were 122 students and five teachers, with classes taught in the three classrooms of the timber building. Due to the lack of facilities at this time, science classes were held in the principal's home garage situated beside the school in Childers Street. By May 1959 classes were held in the Manual Training Block.

In February 1959 work commenced on the Chemistry wing (Block D), which at the time of its completion in January 1960, consisted of three classrooms, and a chemistry laboratory, lecture room, and store. The construction of the Administration block (Block A) began in August 1959 and was occupied by January 1960. A new Physics wing (Block G) and the Home Science wing (Block C) were completed by the end of 1960. These new wings were built to a standard type (F/T7) - highset timber-framed buildings incorporating steel open web floor trusses. The new school was officially opened on the 14 May 1960, with the opening ceremony being well attended by the school community and dignitaries, including the Minister for Education, Jack Pizzey.

Further building work was carried out in 1960 and 1961, with the construction of two general classroom buildings (Block H and Block J). The DPW reported that "the design has been kept in harmony with the existing buildings to which the new block (Block J) will be connected by covered ways".

In 1962 Block A was altered with the conversion of a first floor classroom into more administration space and a ground floor extension was made to accommodate a library at the rear (south). In the same year Block C was altered to accommodate dressmaking by enclosing part of the ground floor.

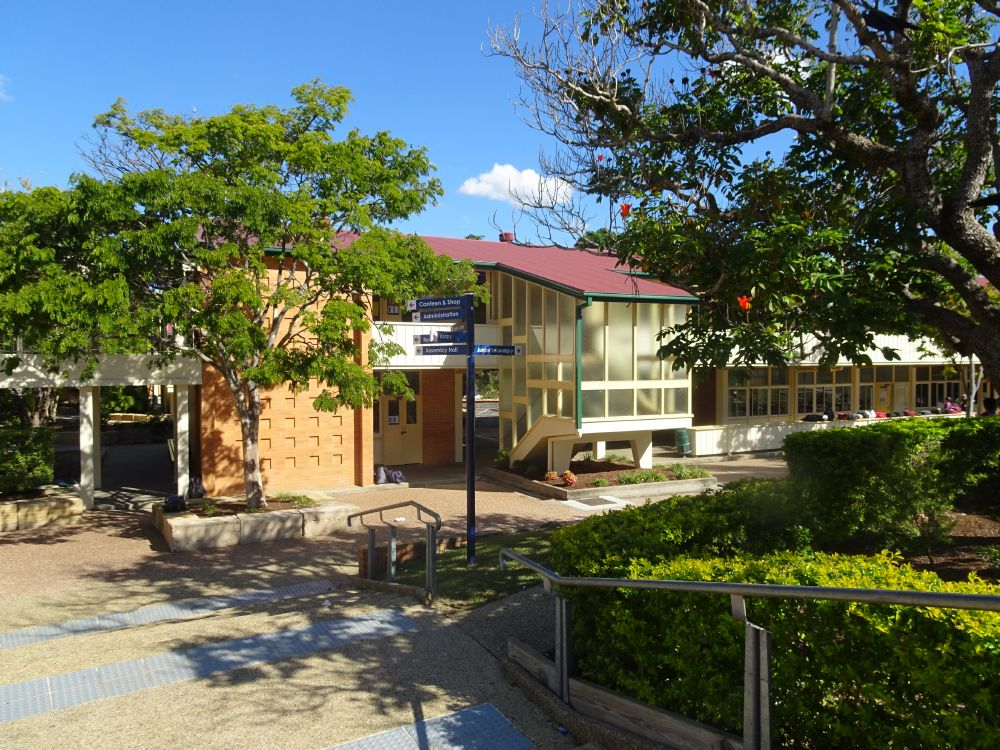
Block F

As enrolment numbers increased through the 1960s, so did the need for additional classroom space and in 1963 the construction of a new Science wing (Block E) and another General Classroom wing (Block F) had commenced and was completed by 1966. These new wings were a standard type (F/T8) – highset timber-framed buildings incorporating a steel portal frame. The 1970 student numbers reflect the school's need for expansion with 1476 enrolments at the beginning of that year.

The original design of the school incorporated an expansive playing field at its rear (south), backing on to Edinburgh Castle Road. Work began on the playing field in October 1959. The surface and drainage of the playing field had been a constant source of concern for the school. Works to the surface were requested by the Parents and Citizens Association, and in August 1964 these were carried out. A previous arrangement between the DPW and the Main Roads Department had been made whereby testing of heavy equipment was carried out on government owned facilities that required improvements. Works to the playing field became an opportunity for the training of Main Roads workers with new equipment. In August 1964 the Courier Mail reported that "the Main Roads Department will hold a 'school' today - and the Wavell Heights High School will get a new oval in the process". Further work was undertaken on the playing field in this year and had been completed by the late 1960s.

A 25-metre (82 ft) swimming pool, located between the school buildings and the playing field was proposed by the Parents and Citizens Association as early as 1965. The pool had been completed by 1969. Over time, other sporting facilities have been added to the site, including basketball courts.

Several other buildings have been constructed on the school site, including the library building (1969–70), the music block (Block M, 1975), and the assembly hall (1979). In 1966 the former Oakleigh State School timber building was removed from the school.

Minor alterations have occurred to the buildings over time. In 2001 Block A was refurbished and a two-storey extension was added to the south side. Block B was extended in 2006 and again in 2017. In 1977 the verandah of Block C was enclosed. In 1985 Block H was altered to accommodate further classrooms by enclosing the ground floor. In 1997–98 half of Block C was demolished due to subsidence and rebuilt. In 2001 Block D was refurbished removing partitions to form a new layout. Also in 2001 Block J was altered to accommodate a gymnasium by enclosing the basement, and small openings were made in partitions of the ground floor. In 2002 a fire damaged the eastern end wall of Block J and it was repaired to match its previous appearance.

Very little tree planting took place within the school grounds prior to the end of the 1960s. Between 1964 and 1969 substantial groundworks were undertaken at the school, which included the bituminisation of some courtyard areas, laying footpaths, and landscape work at the entrance of the school. In 2001 further landscaping work was undertaken to the entrance of the school, which included forming a circular driveway and stairs down to the buildings.

Wavell State High School, established in 1959, has played an important role in the Wavell Heights and district community and continues to do so. Generations of students have been taught there and many social events held in the school's grounds and buildings since its establishment. The school continues to be a centre for social, sporting and community events.

== Description ==
Wavell State High School occupies an 8.72-hectare (21.5-acre) site in Wavell Heights, 7.8 kilometres (4.8 mi) north of the Brisbane CBD. The large site is on a high ridge, which slopes gently south. The complex of buildings stand at the northern end and highest part of the site, with a large playing field occupying the lower, southern half.

The school is well-integrated into the planned layout of the suburb, which is primarily residential. There is a strong relationship between the school entrances and the scale of the streets with quiet streets favoured for access. Telopia Avenue, a minor residential street, rises to terminate at the school on the centre of its north boundary and forms the main entrance. Other minor residential streets terminate at the east and west boundaries of the school, forming secondary entrances. There are no formal entrances on the southern boundary, Edinburgh Castle Road, a busy main thoroughfare.

=== Layout and Courtyards ===
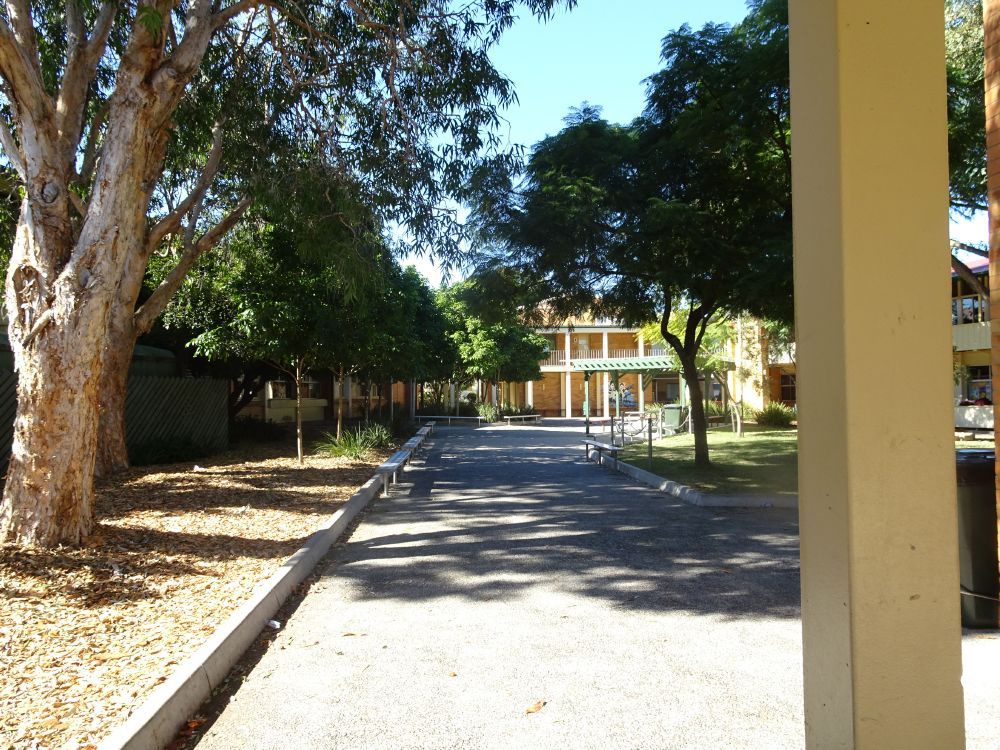
Courtyards, 2018

The school layout is highly intact. The axis of Telopia Avenue is carried through the school site and the early buildings and open spaces between them, circulation paths, and the playing field are arranged symmetrically around or with regard to the axis. Later buildings do not follow this pattern but do not encroach on the original layout.

A wide pedestrian path leads from Telopia Avenue to the centre of Block A, along the axis of the site. It passes under a two-storey concrete covered link that bears "WAVELL STATE HIGH SCHOOL" in large raised letters. Block A accommodates administration and is on the centre of the axis in the middle of the group. Fanning out from Block A and connected to it by two-storey covered links are classroom buildings: Block C, D, and E on the east side, and Block F, G, H, and J on the west side.

The buildings are long and narrow with long sides facing approximately north and south. They are positioned to form wedge-shaped courtyards between them, which accommodate lunch areas and space for student activity.

The buildings are two-storey except Block J, which has a partial third-level understorey due to the fall in the land. They are timber and loadbearing brick structures with gable roofs clad with corrugated metal sheets. Generally, verandahs run along the north side, connecting to stairs and covered links, and a series of classrooms and ancillary school rooms are on the south side. Both long sides are extensively glazed with operable windows and fanlights to permit high levels of natural light and ventilation. The buildings are divided into regular, repeated structural bays defined by face brick piers that extend across both levels on the southern side. The short, gable ends of the buildings have face brick extending across both levels.

=== Block A (1960) ===
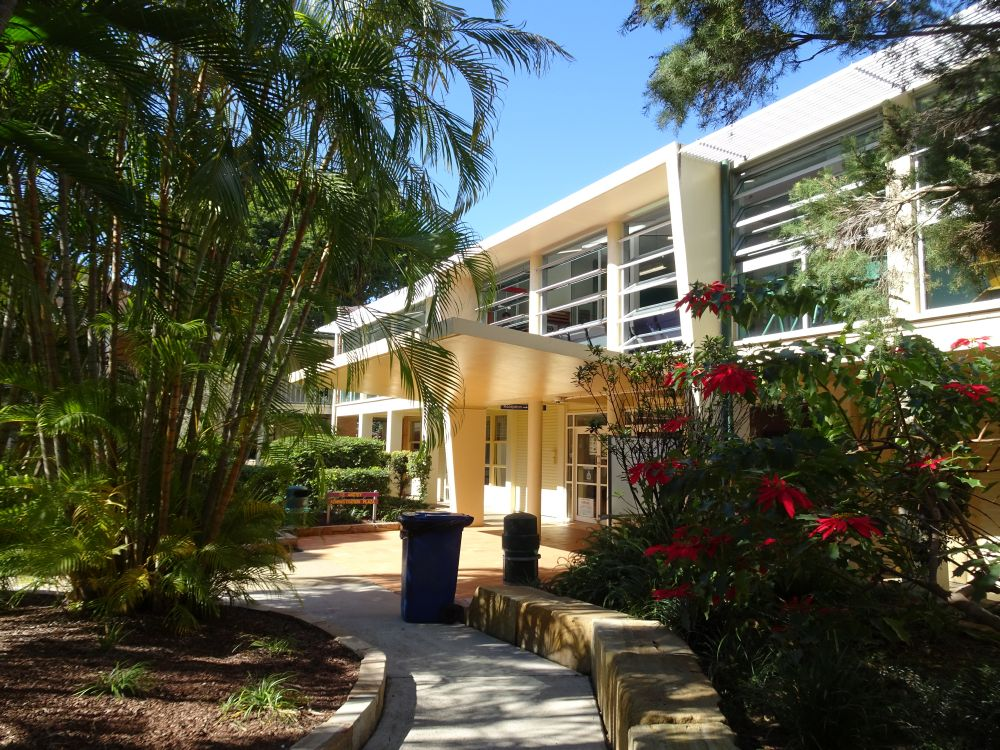
Block A, 2018

Block A accommodates administration use and is the "front door" of the school. A wide open-air foyer with a concrete stair up to the first level has been enclosed with glazing, as has the first level verandah. The verandah walls have been demolished on both levels and replaced in the same position with new walls with different window and door configurations. The southern wall on the ground level has been mostly demolished but that of the first floor has been mostly retained, although the glazing has been replaced or removed.

The large rooms of the ground floor have had lightweight partitions inserted to create small ancillary rooms. The partitions of the first floor have been demolished and new lightweight partitions inserted to a new layout. Original staff toilets are at either end of the building on the first level.

=== Block C (1960) and Block H (1960) ===
Block C and Block H are approximately mirror images of each other standing either side of the central axis.

They are long classroom buildings high set on concrete piers that support steel open-web trusses of the first floor.

The eastern half of Block C is not original, having been built to replace the original demolished due to subsidence, and is not of state-level cultural heritage significance. This replacement is similar to the original but is slightly longer and has a different arrangement of spaces on both levels, however, it follows the general footprint of the original.

The ground and first floor layouts of Block C are not intact, with original partitions demolished and new partitions inserted, the open play area of the ground floor has been enclosed, the verandah has been enclosed for most of its length, and the verandah wall has been demolished to enlarge the classroom. Doors are not original. The southern elevation retains original timber-framed fixed glazing, panels of sheet material, and metal-framed glass louvres fanlights. Some windows have been replaced.

The original open play area of the ground floor of Block H has been enclosed to form further classrooms and the original classroom has had its partitions demolished. The layout of the first floor is mostly intact, although an opening has been made in a partition to combine two classrooms and a partition has been inserted into a classroom at the eastern end of the building. The interiors of both levels have been relined on walls and ceilings with flat sheet material.

=== Block D (1960) and Block G (1960) ===
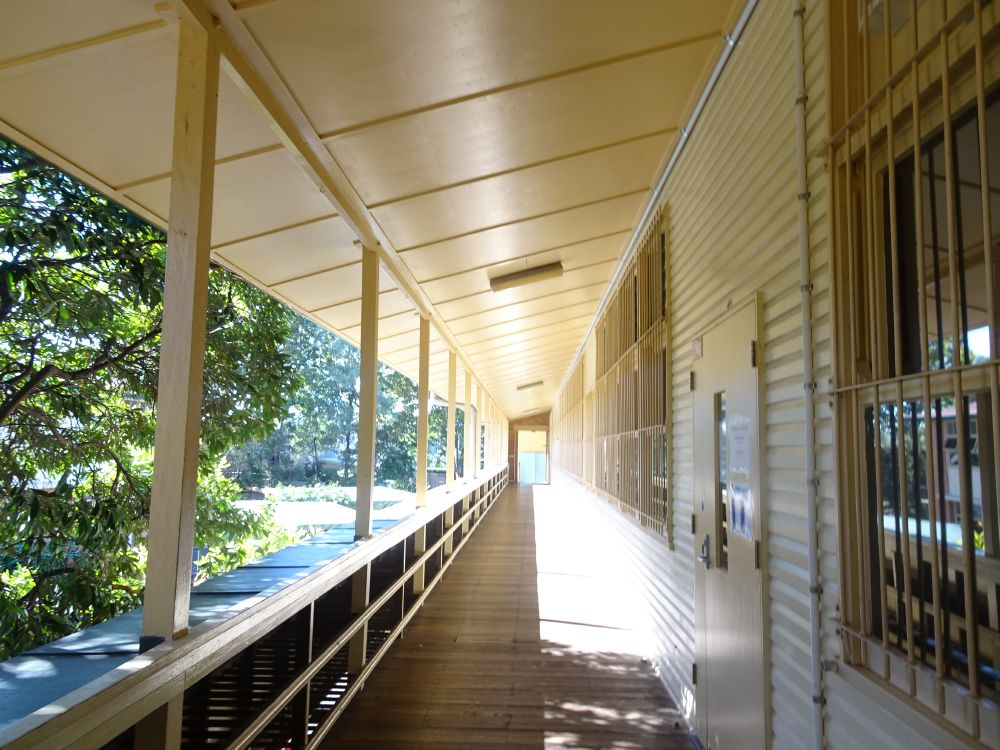
Block D, 2018

Block D and Block G are approximately mirror images of each other standing either side of the central axis.

They are long, high set classroom buildings accommodating large ablution blocks (showers, toilets, and changerooms), and former open play areas (now enclosed for classroom spaces). The first floor accommodates a series of classrooms and ancillary teaching spaces. Supporting the timber-framed first floor, the ground floor has concrete piers with steel open-web trusses (over the former open play area), and loadbearing brick walls, steel open web trusses, and steel posts (ablutions block).

The eastern (Block D) and western (Block G) gable end elevations have original small unglazed window openings.

The layouts of both ablutions blocks are intact, retaining original timber-framed cubicle partitions and doors and masonry partitions. Expressive, glass-enclosed stairs at the ends of the buildings provide access to the first floor. An original enclosed stair on the western end of Block G has been demolished and replaced by a steel-framed two-storey covered link.

The first floor verandah walls are clad with narrow chamferboards and the verandah balustrades are bagracks. Some windows have been replaced to a different design. The first floor doors into classrooms of Block D have been replaced with doors to a different design but those of Block G have been retained.

The first floor layout of Block D has had alterations to the classroom partitions to create larger classrooms but that of Block G is highly-intact.

In both buildings, the interiors of both levels have been relined on walls and ceilings with flat sheet material.

=== Block E (by 1966) and Block F (by 1966) ===
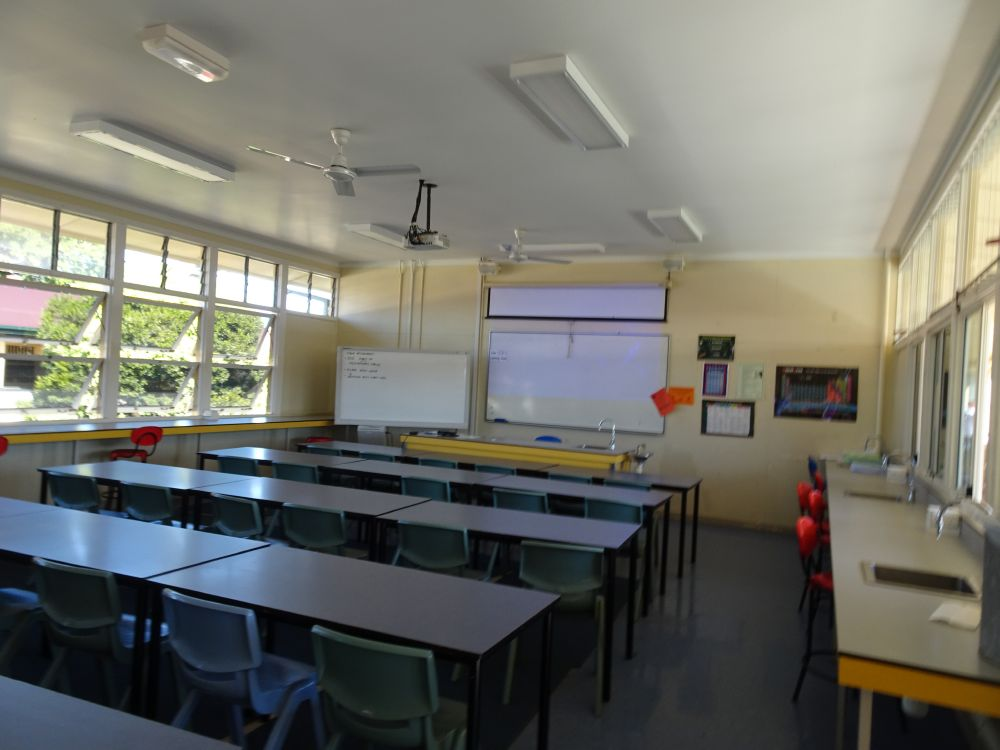
Block E, 2018

Block E and Block F are approximately mirror images of each other standing either side of the central axis and are both highly-intact, long, high set classroom buildings. The ground and first floors accommodate classrooms, store rooms, a janitors' room (originally a locker room, Block E), an open play area (Block F), and staffrooms. Standing on ground floor concrete slabs, they have steel portal frames supporting timber-framed first floors. The portal frames have tapered beams supporting cantilevered verandahs. Expressive, glass-enclosed stairs project north from the verandahs at either ends of the buildings, providing access to the first floors. The stairs stand in low garden beds. The original concrete garden edges are retained in Block F but have been replaced with large stone blocks in Block E.

The verandah wall windows of both buildings have been altered to a different design within the original timber framing.

In Block E, the ground and first floor layouts are intact, except one lightweight partition has been inserted into a classroom of the ground floor, one small opening has been made in two partitions of the first floor, and at the eastern end of the first floor a short length of the verandah has been enclosed and the verandah wall has been demolished to accommodate a larger classroom.

In Block F, the ground floor layout is intact, retaining two sets of original large folding doors between classrooms. The first floor layout has been altered with the demolition of partitions and the insertion of one lightweight partition to create larger classrooms.

In both buildings, the interiors of both levels have been relined on walls and ceilings with flat sheet material.

=== Block J (1961) ===
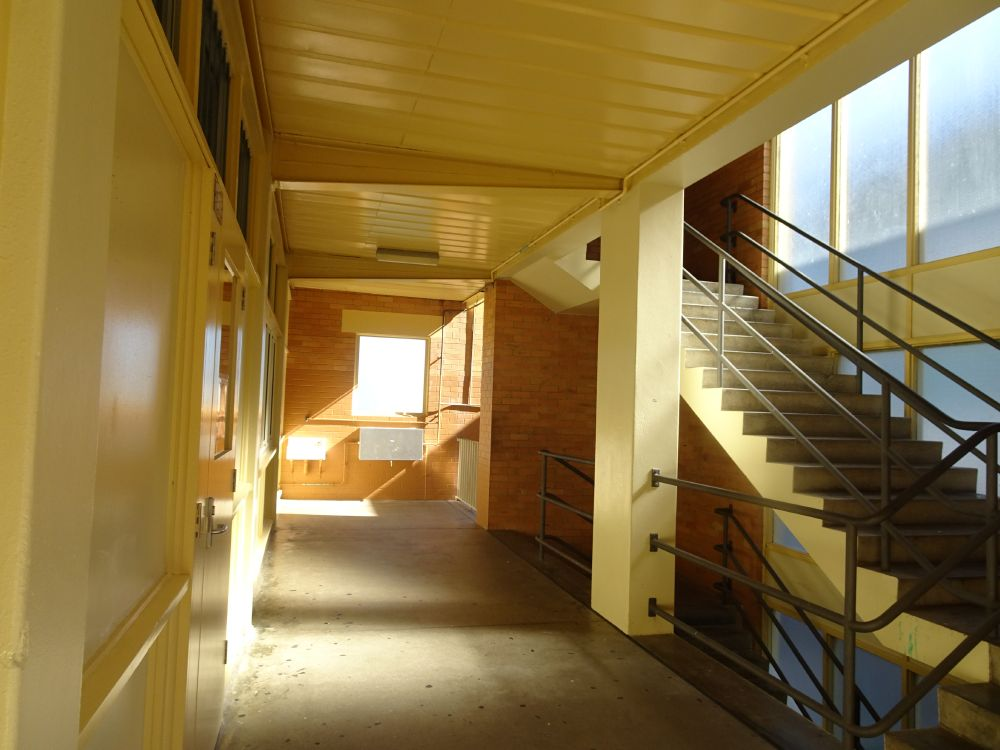
Block J, 2018

Block J is a highly intact, long, high set classroom building standing between Block G and H. The building includes a tall concrete retaining wall forming an eastern upper terrace at the level of the ground floor and a western lower terrace at the level of the basement. A broad concrete stair links the two terraces. The basement, originally an open play space enclosed along the southern perimeter, has been fully enclosed and partitioned to form smaller ancillary school rooms. The building has a mixed structural system: basement concrete slab, posts, and beams; ground floor concrete slab, and steel posts and beams; and a primarily timber-framed first floor. The verandahs are cantilevered on tapered beams and have bagracks balustrades. The building has two concrete stairs enclosed in face brick with stucco panels and large wired glass windows. The western gable end wall features rough concrete tiles and a face brick edged garden bed.

Some verandah wall windows have been altered to a different design within the original timber framing. The ground and first floor layouts are intact, although one partition has had a concertina door inserted to combine two classrooms and doors have been inserted in two other partitions. The interiors of all levels have been relined on walls and ceilings with flat sheet material.

=== Covered Links (1960–66) ===
The covered links between the buildings are highly intact. Most are two-storey, concrete-framed with unpainted concrete or timber floors, have metal balustrades, and have ceilings lined with sheets and battens with original ceiling light fittings. The links off Block J retain original timber framed enclosures on the western side of the ground floor, although the large windows and wide double doors have been removed.

=== Playing Field (1960) ===
The playing field is a large and flat grassed field for sport and play activities.

== Heritage listing ==
Wavell State High School was listed on the Queensland Heritage Register on 27 July 2018 having satisfied the following criteria.

The place is important in demonstrating the evolution or pattern of Queensland's history.

Wavell State High School (established 1959) is important in demonstrating the evolution of state education and its associated architecture in Queensland. The place retains excellent, representative examples of standard government designs that were architectural responses to prevailing government educational philosophies, set in landscaped grounds with sporting facilities.

As a representative example, it is also important in demonstrating the pattern of provision of secondary education on new sites in booming suburbs across Queensland in the 1950s, a time of pronounced population growth.

The place is important in demonstrating the principal characteristics of a particular class of cultural places.

As an intact example, Wavell State High School is important in demonstrating the principal characteristics of a 1950s Queensland state high school. These include: an ordered site layout; cohesive arrangement of interconnected teaching buildings of standard designs by the Department of Public Works (DPW) that incorporate understorey play areas, verandahs, and classrooms with high levels of natural light and ventilation; and a generous, landscaped site with assembly areas and playing field.

The site layout of the buildings, covered links, open spaces, and playing field is a particularly extensive and intact example of late 1950s Queensland state school master planning, which provided for ordered growth from a nucleus and allowed for change in response to the booming post-war population. The school includes seven classroom buildings that contribute to the concept of splayed, long, narrow buildings linked by covered ways around open ended courtyard assembly and play spaces, fanning out from an administration building.

Block D, E, F, G, H, and J (1960–6) are good, intact examples of their standard types, timber-framed school buildings incorporating steel open web or steel portal frame floor trusses for unimpeded play areas under the classrooms. The buildings retain their: highset character; trusses; north-facing verandahs and south-facing classroom windows; and 24 ft (7.3m) wide classrooms.

The place is important because of its aesthetic significance.

Through the extensive masterplan of its buildings and landscapes, Wavell State High School is well known for its aesthetic significance; it’s symmetrical and axial layout of long buildings radiating from a central administration building, separated by open spaces, and unified by consistent form, scale, and materials. The buildings have a basic composition, restrained use of decoration, and a minimal material palette.

The place has a strong or special association with a particular community or cultural group for social, cultural or spiritual reasons.

Schools have always played an important part in Queensland communities. They typically retain significant and enduring connections with former pupils, parents, and teachers; provide a venue for social interaction and volunteer work and are a source of pride, symbolising local progress and aspirations.

Since its establishment in 1959, Wavell State High School has a strong and ongoing association with the surrounding community. The place is important for its contribution to the educational development of Wavell Heights and is a prominent community focal point.
