= Wavell Heights =

- Suburb
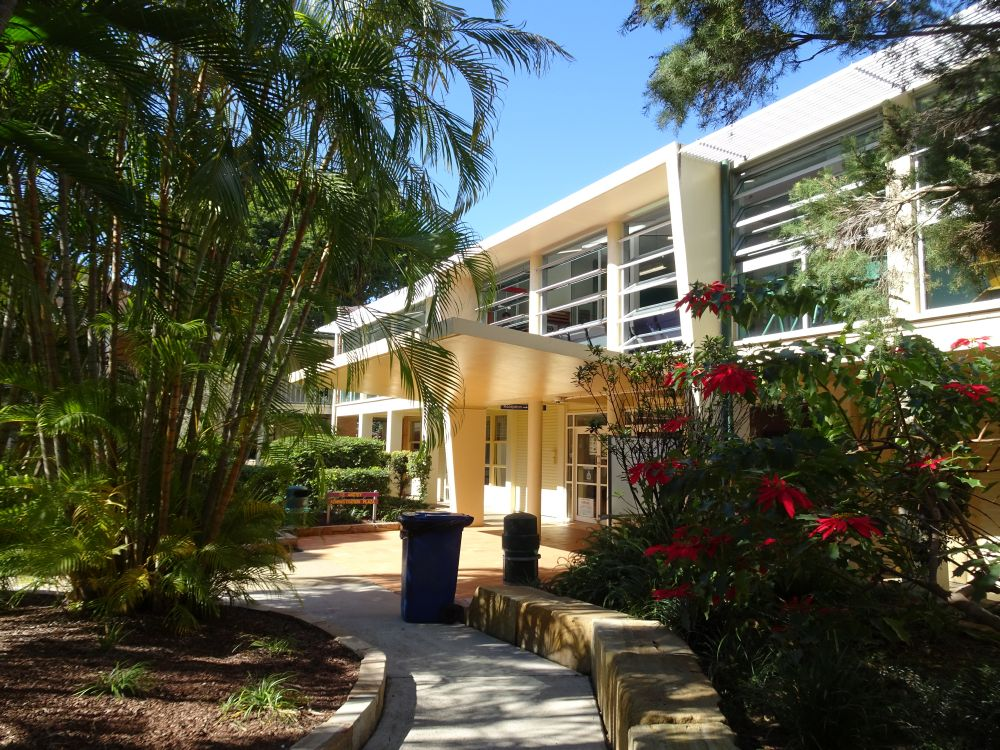
- Wavell State High School, 2018

- Interactive map of Wavell Heights
- Coordinates: 27.3927°S 153.0469°E
- Country: Australia
- State: Queensland
- City: Brisbane
- LGA: City of Brisbane (Northgate Ward)
- Location: 10.5 km (6.5 mi) N of Brisbane CBD
- Established: 1940s

Government
  - State electorates: Nudgee; Stafford
  - Federal division: Lilley

Area
  - Total: 4.1 km^{2} (1.6 sq mi)

Population
  - Total: 10,336 (2021 census)
  - Density: 2,521/km^{2} (6,530/sq mi)
- Time zone: UTC+10:00 (AEST)
- Postcode: 4012
Suburbs around Wavell Heights
Chermside	Geebung	Virginia
Chermside	Wavell Heights	Nundah
Kedron	Kalinga	Nundah

Wavell Heights (/ˈweɪvəl/ WAY-vəl) is a northern suburb in the City of Brisbane, Queensland, Australia. In the 2021 census, Wavell Heights had a population of 10,336 people.

== Geography ==
Wavell Heights is located 10.5 kilometres (6.5 mi) north of the Brisbane central business district. The land use is almost entirely residential, apart from Mercer Park and Shaw Park in the southernmost part of the suburb.

== History ==
In December 1935 the Methodist Church bought four parcels of land in Rode Road. A timber-framed weatherboard-clad building opened on 28 May 1938 and was used for all church purposes: services, Sunday school and social activities. It was known as the West Nundah Methodist Church. The building was extended in 1947 to cater for a larger congregation. In 1957 a new brick church was opened beside the original building, which was then only used as a church hall. In 1977 the Methodist Church was amalgamated into the Uniting Church of Australia and the church and hall are now known as the Wavell Heights Uniting Church and Hall.

The Catholic Church of St Paschal Baylon was opened and blessed by Archbishop James Duhig on 8 August 1937. Due to the growth in the congregation, a new building was constructed with the church on the lower floor and space for a school on the upper floor.

In 1941 the Brisbane City Council requested that the area commonly known as West Nundah be recognised as Wavell Heights. It is named after Field Marshal Lord Wavell who was the Commander-In-Chief of the Allied Forces in the Middle East during the Second World War.

Wavell Heights State School opened on 27 January 1948, following a post-war expansion in Brisbane's northern suburbs. Through the 1950s and 1960s, the school grew to be a large primary school with over 900 enrolments, but during the 1970s, this number began to decline dramatically. By the 1990s, enrolments were as low as 210, but this number has since increased to over 300. In April 2011, one of the school's main classroom buildings was destroyed in an arson attack.

Our Lady of the Angels' Catholic School opened on 22 January 1950 under the management of the Presentation Sisters until the mid-1990s when the school came under lay leadership.

Wavell Heights Presbyterian Church opened in 1953.

St Thomas' Anglican Church was dedicated on 13 October 1957 by Archbishhop Reginald Halse. Its closure on 21 December 1990 was approved by Assistant Bishop George Browning. It was deconsecrated was authorised by Archbishop Peter Hollingworth. It was at 4 Watcombe Street in Chermside East which is now within Wavell Heights (27.3846°S 153.0457°E). As at 2020, the church building is being used as a residence but the cross on the roof and the words "St Thomas" on the front have been retained.

Wavell State High School opened on 27 January 1959.

== Demographics ==
In the 2011 census, Wavell Heights had a population of 9,435 people; 51.7% female and 48.3% male. The median age of the Wavell Heights population was 36 years, 1 year below the Australian median. Children aged under 15 years made up 20.9% of the population and people aged 65 years and over made up 13.1% of the population. 78.5% of people living in Wavell Heights were born in Australia, compared to the national average of 69.8%; the next most common countries of birth were New Zealand 3.7%, England 3.2%, Philippines 0.8%, India 0.8%, Italy 0.6%. 87.8% of people spoke only English at home; the next most popular languages were 1.3% Italian, 0.5% Tagalog, 0.5% Cantonese, 0.5% Mandarin, 0.4% French.

In the 2016 census, Wavell Heights had a population of 9,684 people.

In the 2021 census, Wavell Heights had a population of 10,336 people.

== Heritage listings ==
Wavell Heights has a number of heritage-listed sites:

- Tooroonga, 36 Highcrest Avenue
- Pfingst Farmhouse, 57 Highcrest Avenue
- Hamlin's Nursery Residence, 35 Odonnell Street
- former Dr Hedley Brown Residence, 2 Rode Road
- Anzac Cottage, 142 Rode Road
- former West Nundah Methodist Church (also known as The Uniting Church Hall), 149 Rode Road
- Westwood Farmhouse, 214 Rode Road
- former Brook Hill Hospital (also known as Brook Hill Convalescent Home), 184 Shaw Road
- Wavell Heights Presbyterian Church, 64 Spence Road (27.3923°S 153.0462°E)
- Gohdes Farmhouse, 121 Spence Road
- Wavell State High School buildings, Telopia Avenue (27.3998°S 153.0372°E)

== Education ==
Wavell Heights State School is a government primary (Prep–6) school for boys and girls at Minore Street (27.3900°S 153.0378°E). In 2018, the school had an enrolment of 491 students with 33 teachers (29 full-time equivalent) and 23 non-teaching staff (13 full-time equivalent).

Our Lady of the Angels' School is a Catholic primary (Prep–6) school for boys and girls at 30 Warraba Avenue (27.3936°S 153.0403°E). In 2018, the school had an enrolment of 602 students with 40 teachers (34 full-time equivalent) and 23 non-teaching staff (13 full-time equivalent).

Wavell State High School is a government secondary (7–12) school for boys and girls at Telopia Avenue (27.3979°S 153.0378°E). In 2018, the school had an enrolment of 1,597 students with 120 teachers (116 full-time equivalent) and 40 non-teaching staff (33 full-time equivalent). It includes a special education program. It is among the largest of public secondary schools in Brisbane's northern suburbs.

== Notable residents ==
- Darryl Brohman, rugby league player and coach
- Jacob Elordi, actor
