= Harriet Marks =

Australian schoolteacher and educationist (1900 – 1989)

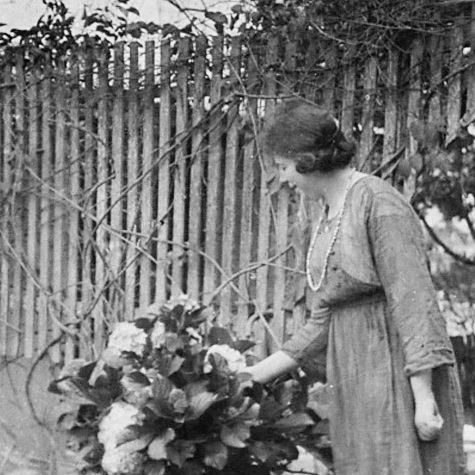
- in 1922
- Born: Harriet Elizabeth Marks; 25 November 1900; Charters Towers
- Died: 1 March 1989 (aged 88); Auchenflower
- Education: University of Queensland
- Occupation: Domestic science school inspector

Harriet Elizabeth Marks (25 November 1900 – 1 March 1989) was an Australian schoolteacher and educationist. She was the principal of the Domestic Science High School in Brisbane. She was the inspector of domestic science for schools in Queensland and President of the Women's College council in the 1970s.

== Life ==
Marks was born in Queensland in 1900. Her parents had been born in the UK. Her mother Harriet Ann (born McGregor) was a Scot, and her father George Marks was from Cornwall. She was their first child and her parents returned to England between 1906 and 1910 but they then returned to Charters Towers, which is where she had been born. After local schooling she won a scholarship to study science at the University of Queensland's newly opened Women's College. The college was founded in 1913 and it admitted its first women residents in 1914 under Freda Bage, the first principal.

She was an admirer of the domestic science pioneer Marianne Helena Brydon who had been the first Inspector of Women's Work from 1919 to 1932. In 1943 Marks rejoined the Women's College as a senior tutor. She was the assistant to Freda Bage who was still there.

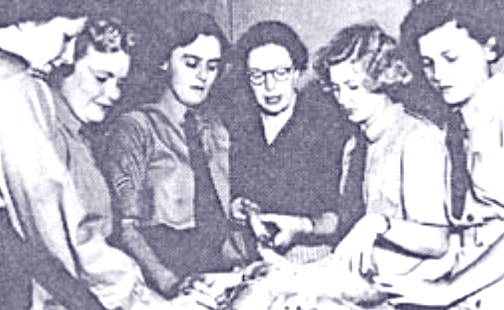
Harriet Marks teaches dissection as part of Army Education Service and Department of Public Instruction in 1944

In 1951 she became the principal of the Domestic Science High School in Brisbane and in 1953 she left the Women's College to become the first Inspector and Supervisor of domestic science courses in Queensland's secondary schools.

In 1959 she went to New Zealand to take a refresher course. She spoke to several people and this resulted in the creation of the Home Economics Association of Queensland. She wrote and published, Nutrition and Elementary Food Science.

The joined the Women's College's council and in the 1970s she was the council's President. The Women's College named their dining hall for Harriet Marks in 1981. She left the council in 1986. In 1987 a painting was made of her by Lola McCausland and the University offers a bursary in her name.

Marks died in the Brisbane suburb of Auchenflower in 1989. Her papers are held in her alma mater.
