= Peter Timms =

Australian koala conservationist

Peter Timms is an Australian koala conservationist. He is best known for his scientific contributions relating to infectious disease threats to koalas such as chlamydia and koala retrovirus.

After attending Wavell State High School, Timms studied at the University of Queensland where he graduated with a PhD in molecular microbiology in 1989.

He has published over 240 papers, reviews and chapters in scientific journals such as Nature Genetics, PNAS, Scientific Reports and the Journal of Virology.

Timms was featured on a Catalyst episode in 2021, called "Are We Killing Our Koalas", hosted by Tim Flannery.

Timms is currently a professor of microbiology at the University of the Sunshine Coast and the deputy director of the university's GeneCology Research Centre. Prior to joining the University of the Sunshine Coast in 2014, he was a professor at the Queensland University of Technology.

In 2022, Timms was named as a Queensland Great.
