= Wavell State High School =

Location
- Wavell Heights, Queensland; Australia; 27°23′55.5″S 153°02′15.4″E

Information
- Type: Public, secondary
- Motto: Esse Quam Videri (To be rather than to seem to be)
- Established: 1959
- Principal: Luke Ferdinands
- Grades: 7–12
- Enrolment: 1674 (2019)
- Colours: Maroon , navy blue and royal blue
- Website: wavellshs.eq.edu.au

Wavell State High School is a coeducational public secondary school based in Wavell Heights, City of Brisbane, Queensland, Australia. The school has a total enrolment of more than 1500 students from years 7–12, with an official count of 1674 students in 2019. Since 2025, the role of Acting Executive Principal of the School has been held by Luke Ferdinands.

Some of the school's buildings are listed on the Queensland Heritage Register.

== History ==
Wavell State High School opened on 27 January 1959 under the leadership of the founding Principal, C.E. Anstey. As the suburb of the school, Wavell Heights, which was named in 1942, Wavell State High School was named after Field Marshal Archibald Percival Wavell, 1st Earl Wavell (5 May 1883 – 24 May 1950), a Commander-in-Chief of British and Dominion Forces in the Middle East from July 1939 to July 1941. Many Australians served under his command during the early period of World War II; mostly in North Africa, Greece, Crete and Syria.

In 2018, many of the school's original buildings were added to the Queensland Heritage Register in recognition of their historical and cultural significance.

In early 2021, Jeff Major, the school's eighth principal and its longest-serving principal, announced that he would take extended leave as part of his transition towards retirement. He was succeeded in an acting capacity by Elizabeth Foster of MacGregor State High School.

== Sporting houses ==
Wavell State High School's four sporting houses, Alamein, Burma, Keren and Tobruk, are named in reference to places and battles associated with Earl Wavell:

- Alamein commemorates the Second Battle of El Alamein, the turning point of World War II in the Middle East.
- Burma, part of Wavell's responsibilities as Commander-in-Chief of the south-West Pacific, was invaded in December 1941 by the Japanese Army who gained control of the country by May 1942. Australian Air Force and Navy personnel were among those Allied forces who retook Burma in 1945.
- Keren was the location of a decisive and bitter battle from 15 to 26 March 1941 in which British troops defeated Italian troops.
- Tobruk was the scene of a siege in which allied servicemen defended the town against the German Army from 10 April to 7 December 1941. This siege of 242 days is the longest in British Military history.

== Notable alumni ==
The school is known for producing many rugby league footballers that have played in the NRL.

=== Rugby league ===
- Kurt Baptiste
- Adam Blair
- Darryl Brohman, also a commentator and media personality
- Dale Copley
- Richard Faʻaoso
- Tom Gilbert
- Ashley Harrison
- Greg Inglis
- Sam Kasiano
- Francis Molo
- Michael Molo
- Jayden Nikorima
- Kodi Nikorima
- Karl Oloapu
- Smith Samau
- Sam Tagataese
- Tuku Hau Tapuha
- Tevita Toloi
- Shane Tronc
- Elianna Walton
- Jake Webster

=== Other sports ===
- Jason Akermanis, Australian Rules footballer
- Madonna Blyth, field hockey player
- Naomi Castle, water polo player in 2000 & 2004 Olympics. Gold medallist at 2000 Olympics in Sydney. Captain (2004).
- Joyce Lester, softball player, 1996 Olympics Bronze Medal, Team member 1977–1996, Captain (1985–1996)
- Sandra Yost, Commonwealth Games Swimmer 1974 Gold 200m Butterfly, Silver 200m Backstroke, Bronze 100m Butterfly

=== Other ===
- Anthony Chisholm, Senator
- Sir Ross Cranston, High Court of Justice of England and Wales
- Jessica and Lisa Origliasso of The Veronicas
- Peter Timms, koala conservationist
- Kerry Millard, former Qld State Member of Parliament

== Notable staff ==
- Ross Henrick
