= Queensland Highlanders Pipe Band =

Australian pipe band

- Established: 1996
- Disbanded: 2016
- Location: Brisbane, Queensland, Australia
- Grade: 1 (former)
- Pipe major: Jason Palfrey
- Drum sergeant: Stuart Palfrey
- Tartan: Stewart of Appin
- Notable honours: 2001 Grade 2 World Champions

The Queensland Highlanders Pipe Band was a grade one pipe band based in Brisbane, Queensland, Australia.

The band's pipe major was Jason Palfrey; lead drummer was Stuart Palfrey.

The band was formed in 1996 by Fraser Martin and a small group of dedicated musicians keen to build an exciting pipe band from the ground up. Despite the relatively short history of the band, it has enjoyed a high level of success in both competitive and entertainment endeavours.

The band competed in the World Pipe Band Championships in 2000 where it was placed 5th in Grade 2. In 2001, they competed in the championships again and won in the Grade 2 category. They were the first civilian pipe band from Australia to win this title.

The band won the Australian Pipe Band Championships in Grade 1 in 2004.

The band merged in 2016 with the Emmanuel College, University of Queensland, pipe band, to form the Emmanuel College Highlanders at the University of Queensland. The band continues to compete in Grade 2.
