= St Andrews War Memorial Hospital Administration Building =

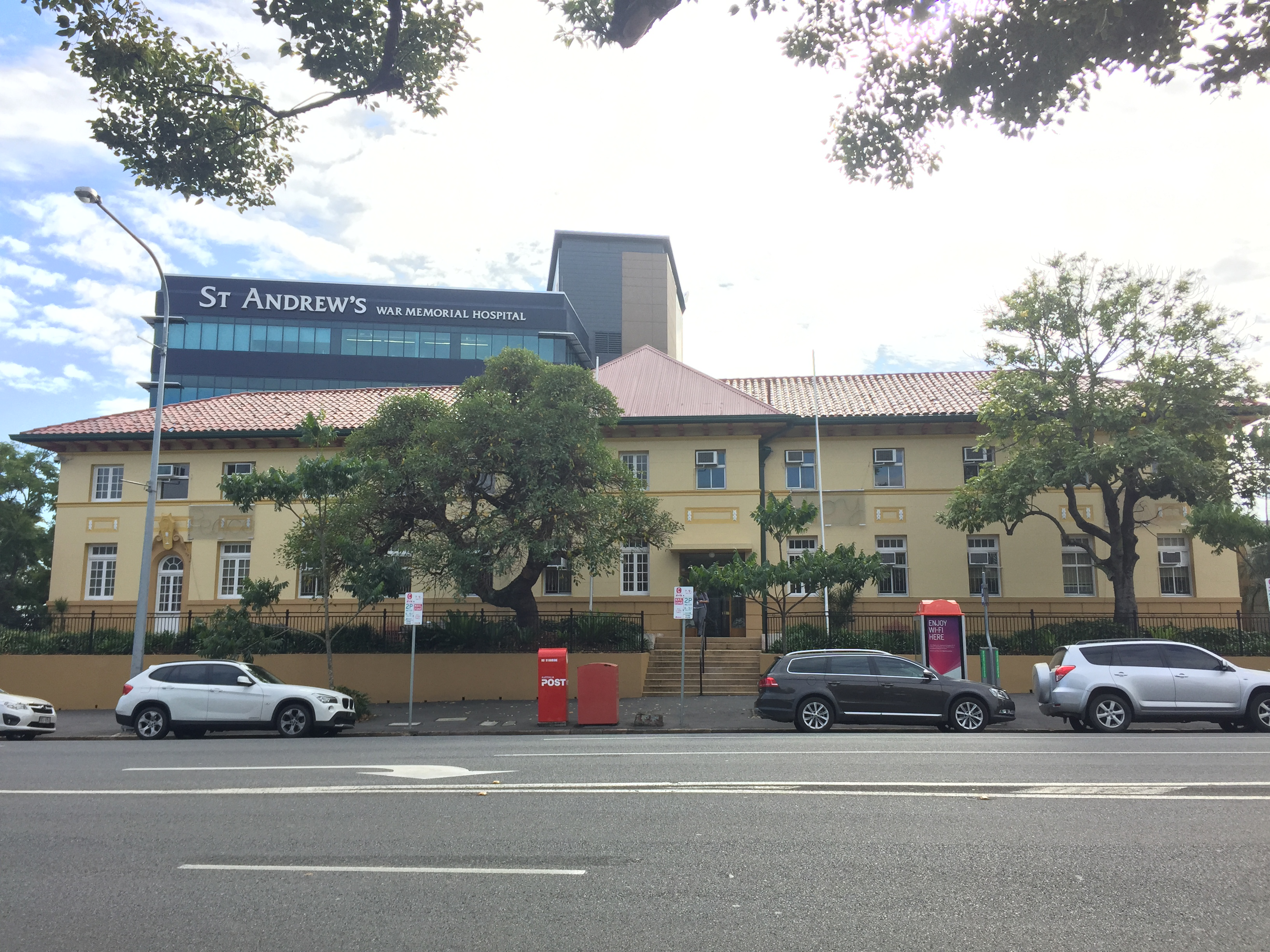
- St Andrew's War Memorial Hospital Administration Building

- Location within Queensland Location within Australia
- 27.4616°S 153.0208°E
- Location: 465 Wickham Terrace, Spring Hill, City of Brisbane, Queensland, Australia

History
- Design period: 1840s–1860s (mid-19th century)
- Built: 1860s–1936

Queensland Heritage Register
- Official name: St Andrews War Memorial Hospital Administration Building, Emmanuel College
- Type: state heritage (built)
- Designated: 24 March 2000
- Reference no.: 602170
- Significant period: 1860s–1930s (fabric); 1860s–1950s (historical); 1950s (social)
- Significant components: lead light/s, residential accommodation – flat/s, furniture/fittings, residential accommodation – main house, college – residential, garden/grounds

St Andrews War Memorial Hospital Administration Building is a heritage-listed former house and residential college and now hospital administration building at 465 Wickham Terrace, Spring Hill, City of Brisbane, Queensland, Australia. It was built from 1860s to 1936. It was also known as Emmanuel College. It was added to the Queensland Heritage Register on 24 March 2000.

== History ==
St Andrew's War Memorial Hospital Administration Building is a two-storey rendered masonry building, the greater part of which was constructed in 1931 and 1936, and that also encompasses sections of a residence owned by Sir Charles Lilley dating from the late 1860s. From 1912 to 1954, the building was occupied by Emmanuel College, the Presbyterian college of residence of the University of Queensland. When the college relocated to the university's St Lucia campus in 1954, the building became part of St Andrews War Memorial Hospital.

Crown land along Leichardt Street and Wickham Terrace was sold from 1856 marking the beginning of the development of Spring Hill, the "second northside suburb within the old town boundary of Brisbane". The meandering ridge roads of Wickham and Gregory Terrace were cleared of eucalyptus forest and indigenous communities in the late 1850s to 1870s to make way for the residences of the Brisbane elite. One of these was judge and politician, Sir Charles Lilley. Between 1863 and 1889, several parcels of land in the block now bounded by Bradley Street, Boundary Street, Wickham Terrace and North Street were purchased by Lilley or his trustees.

An article in The Queenslander, 29 May 1930, claims that Lilley built Jesmond Cottage, a "one storeyed stone dwelling with slate roof" in Spring Hill around the time he was Queensland Premier in the late 1860s. As his family grew, it is believed that he added a two-storey stone extension and acquired or built an adjacent cottage which was used as accommodation for his sons.

Lilley emigrated to Sydney in 1856 but soon moved to Brisbane where he worked in the law and as an editor for the Moreton Bay Courier. In 1858, he married Sarah Jane Jeays, the daughter of Brisbane architect and mayor Joshua Jeays. Lilley's legal and political career advanced during the 1860s and 1870s. In 1860, he was elected a Member of the Queensland Legislative Assembly for Fortitude Valley and became Attorney-General in Macalister's ministry in 1866 and 1867. He was Premier of Queensland from 1868 to 1870, appointed Chief Justice of the Supreme Court in 1879 and received a knighthood in 1881. He is best remembered as a champion of free education as his 1870 Act introduced free primary education in Queensland. Sir Charles Lilley died in 1897, leaving a widow and thirteen children. The site in Spring Hill remained in the hands of his trustees until the death of his son, Edwyn Mitford Lilley in 1911, at which point the land was subdivided and sold.

Following the opening of the University of Queensland at Gardens Point in March 1911, Emmanuel College purchased over an acre of land on Wickham Terrace towards the end of the year. Emmanuel College was the Presbyterian Church's residential college and Theological Hall and was one of the first residential colleges to be established, along with St John's and King's Colleges in Kangaroo Point in 1912, Women's College also at Kangaroo Point in 1914 and St Leo's also on Wickham Terrace in 1918. None of these other early college buildings have survived.

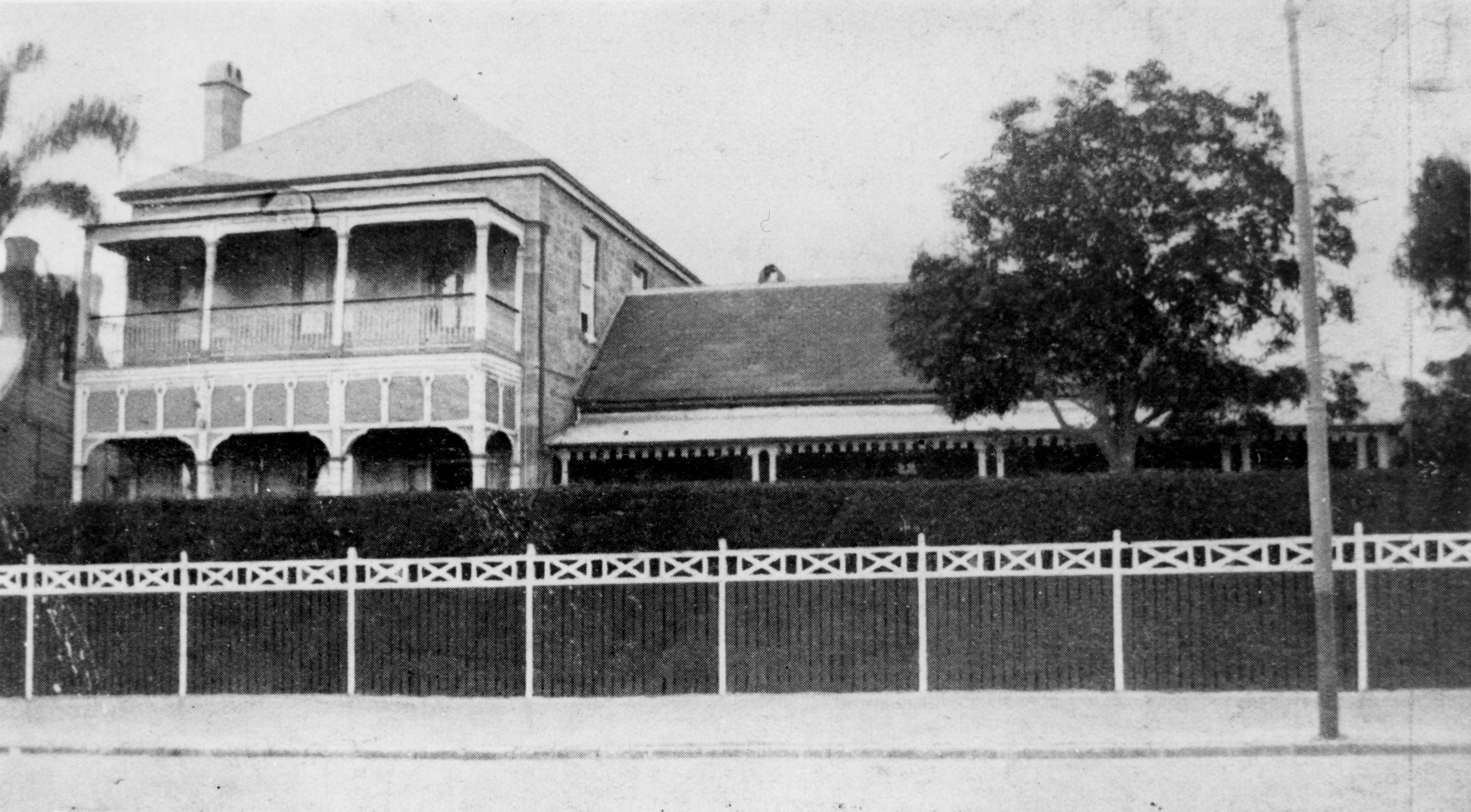
Emmanuel College, Wickham Terrace, 1930

The Presbyterian College Committee was formed in 1910 and £856 was subscribed towards the costs of buying suitable premises for a college by a large number of Brisbane residents. The decision was made to purchase the former Lilley residence, then being used as a boarding house, and the college opened with five students on 15 May 1912. For twelve years this remained the principal building of the college. Also on the site were a separate kitchen block and three cottages. The cottage on the block of land bordered by Bradley and Boundary Streets was pulled down and the land sold within a few years of the establishment of the college. The timber cottage to the West and facing Wickham Terrace was used as the Principal's residence and demolished in 1936 and another facing Bradley Street provided quarters for the domestic staff.

A two-storey fibro-cement building, at the eastern end and perpendicular to the buildings facing Wickham Terrace, was completed in 1923. Initially this building had twelve students' rooms on the top floor and a dining room and billiard room on the first floor with showers and bathrooms in a basement at the north end of the building. In 1927, a three-storey brick building comprising a new dining hall, kitchen and student rooms was completed at a cost of £5000. The old kitchen block was also demolished at this time. In 1931, the stone house was extensively remodelled with the addition of a two-storey cement wing on the eastern side, the rendering of the original stonework and changes to window openings. These alterations were designed by Brisbane architect Douglas Francis Woodcraft Roberts and cost £2750. A western wing was constructed in 1936 to a cost of £6500. The detailing is the similar to the earlier alterations but it is not known whether Roberts was also involved in this extension.

After World War II the University re-located from Garden's Point to St Lucia and Emmanuel College moved to new premises at the same time.

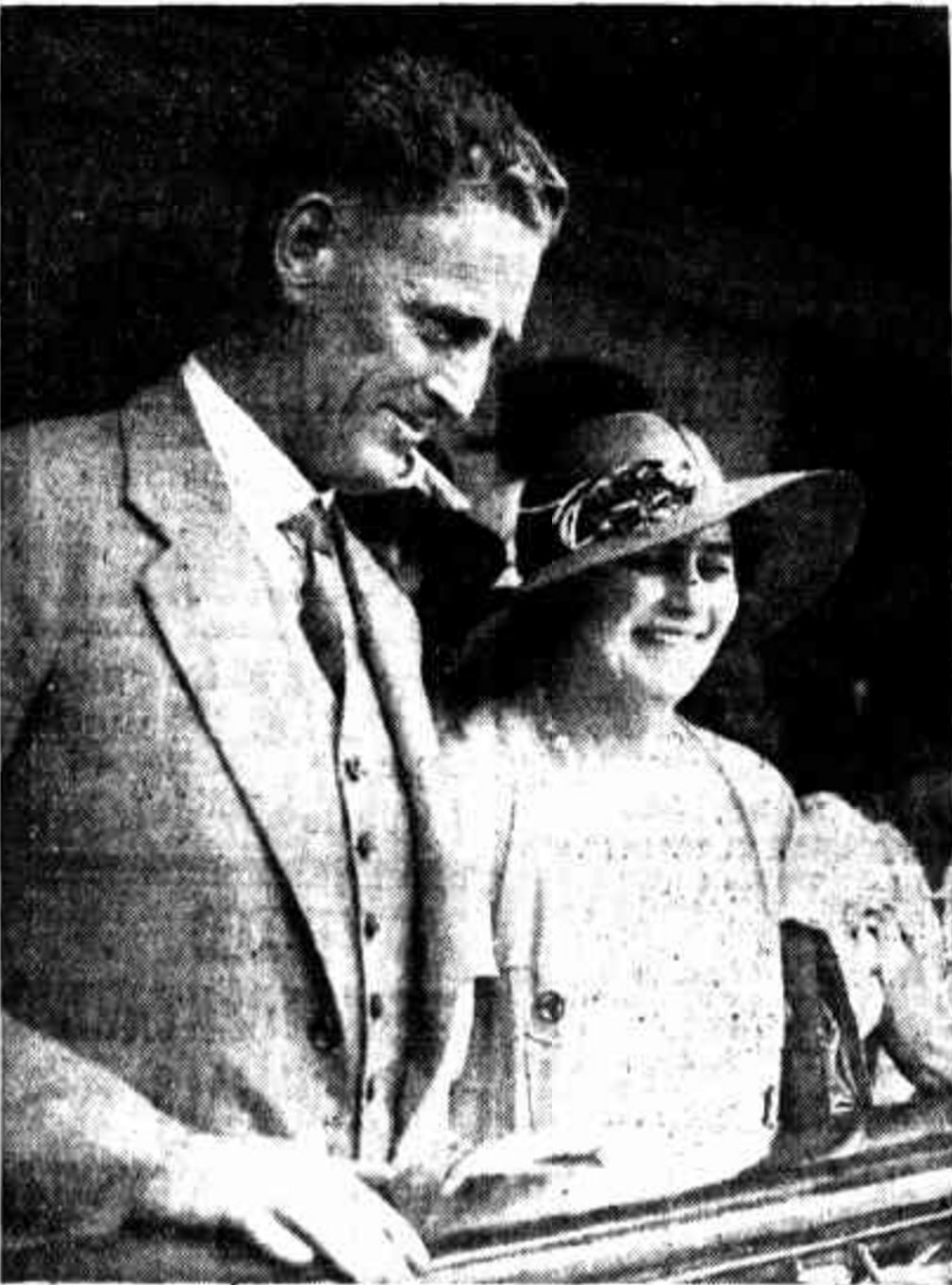
Dr Alexander Mayes and wife Thora, 1934

Following World War II, Dr Alexander Mayes became the chairman of the committee of the Presbyterian Church to raise funding for the construction of a war memorial Hospital in Brisbane, built to honour the memories of the Australians who died in the war. Mayes' vision was "I see a 350 bed hospital as our goal, covering all major specialties, with excellent diagnostic facilities and operating theatres". In 1954, the old Emmanuel College was purchased by the Presbyterian Church of Queensland for the establishment of the hospital. In May 1958, the St Andrew's War Memorial Hospital opened with a surgical ward, medical ward and a small children's ward. The church bought most of the remaining land on the block bounded by Wickham Terrace, Boundary, North and Bradley Streets during the 1950s and 1960s and the hospital has continued to develop the site in succeeding decades. The main building of the former Emmanuel College has become the front of the hospital and has been used variously for administrative purposes, nurses' accommodation and the children's ward. The building is currently used as offices by the hospital administration.

Mayes served as chairman of the board of governors of the hospital for many years. The hospital had an annual fundraising Scottish fair at Brisbane City Hall each year for which Mayes cooked haggis.

== Description ==
St Andrew's War Memorial Hospital Administration Block is a two-storey, rendered masonry building located on Wickham Terrace, opposite Albert Park. A brick retaining wall with two entrances fronts Wickham Terrace, together with a small garden area with two flagpoles. The building is rectangular in form in three sections which present a symmetrical facade to the street. A central section with a pyramidal roof of corrugated steel is flanked by two wings with hip roofs clad in half-round, terracotta tiles. The roofs have deep, boxed eaves with decorative brackets and timber panelled soffit.

The lower section of the ground floor is strongly expressed as a base with a rusticated ashlar-like finish to the render. The upper part of the facade is subdivided by a string course at the sill level of the upper floor windows. The exterior of the building features regularly placed rectangular windows, taller on the ground floor and smaller at the upper level with rectangular moulded panels between them. A number of timber, multi-paned casement windows and fanlights survive although many others have been replaced with aluminium framed windows in order to accommodate air conditioners. The main entrance is located to one side of the central section and has a concrete awning with recent automatic door. An ornate, arched doorway recessed into the wall is found at the western end of the Wickham Terrace facade. The door itself has five raised horizontal timber panels with an arched timber fanlight and is richly ornamented with a cartouche above the fanlight.

At the rear of the building, evidence of the 1860s house is apparent. The central section is painted sandstone ashlar with several original window openings and a sandstone chimney. In the interior of this section some of the planning of the former residence is discernible and several door openings, mouldings and sections of timber floor remain. The chimney-breast can be seen at both ground and first floor levels and an early dog-leg staircase with balustrade and curved handrail remain. This section of the building has been altered over time. Many of the rooms have decorated plaster ceilings and deep cornices with Art Nouveau inspired ornamentation. The front entrance to the building opens into a hallway space and reception area that has a recent, low ceiling of acoustic tiles and a timber reception desk. Central hallways run from the entry area through both the western and eastern wings.

On both levels of these wings the planning is essentially that of the former Emmanuel College with rows of equal-sized, small rooms located either side of the hallway. Most of these have decorative plaster ceilings and cornices. The far western end of the building departs from this pattern. On the ground floor, a board room is located in the north-western corner, the room has been recently decorated and has padded wall panelling up to picture rail height. A dog-leg staircase is located outside the board room and has curvilinear, wrought iron balusters and a curved timber handrail.

At the top of this staircase is an entrance doorway to a suite of rooms, articulated as a separate apartment. The entrance door has the stylised appearance of an external door with large hammered-finish, decorative copper hinges, leadlight window and wrought iron door knocker and peephole. A small vestibule is separated from the main rooms of the apartment by a pair of swinging leadlight doors with an Art Deco influence. The main two rooms are panelled in two toned timber with a plate rail and highly decorative ceiling edges and cornice. A recent partition has been inserted into this area dividing it into three small rooms. A brick fireplace is located in the north- west corner. The other two rooms of the apartment are finished in smooth render with decorative ceilings. A bathroom is located at the end of the hall at the west end of the building and appears to have been part of the apartment. The walls are tiled in white, oblong ceramic tiles with a black tiled edge and a random placement of richly coloured Art Deco style tiles. The floor is finished in black and white tiles with a Greek key patterned edge.

== Heritage listing ==
St Andrews War Memorial Hospital Administration Building was listed on the Queensland Heritage Register on 24 March 2000 having satisfied the following criteria.

The place is important in demonstrating the evolution or pattern of Queensland's history.

St Andrew's War Memorial Hospital Administration Building is important in demonstrating the evolution of Queensland's history, representing the development of the Spring Hill area from its earliest residential development through to institutional uses across the twentieth century.

From 1954, the administration building has been associated with St Andrew's Hospital, demonstrating changes in nursing and health practices.

The place demonstrates rare, uncommon or endangered aspects of Queensland's cultural heritage.

As the last remaining example of an early residential college in Brisbane city, dating from the time that the University of Queensland was located in the city, St Andrew's War Memorial Hospital Administration Building demonstrates rare and uncommon aspects of Queensland's cultural heritage.

The place has potential to yield information that will contribute to an understanding of Queensland's history.

St Andrew's War Memorial Hospital Administration Building has the potential to yield information about 1860s houses in Brisbane.

The place is important because of its aesthetic significance.

It has aesthetic significance due to the quality of its design and decorative details. In particular, the building makes an important contribution to the Wickham Terrace streetscape.

The place has a strong or special association with a particular community or cultural group for social, cultural or spiritual reasons.

From 1912 until the College re-located to St. Lucia after World War II, the Wickham Terrace college building was a hub of student life and the Theological Hall of the Presbyterian church.

The place has a special association with the life or work of a particular person, group or organisation of importance in Queensland's history.

The place has a strong association with Emmanuel College, the Presbyterian Church and with St Andrew's War Memorial Hospital.

St Andrew's War Memorial Hospital Administration Building has a special association with Sir Charles Lilley, a former Premier and Chief Justice of Queensland and campaigner for free education in the state, as it encompasses sections of his residence dating from the 1860s.
