= Freda Bage =

Australian biologist, university professor

Freda Bage OBE
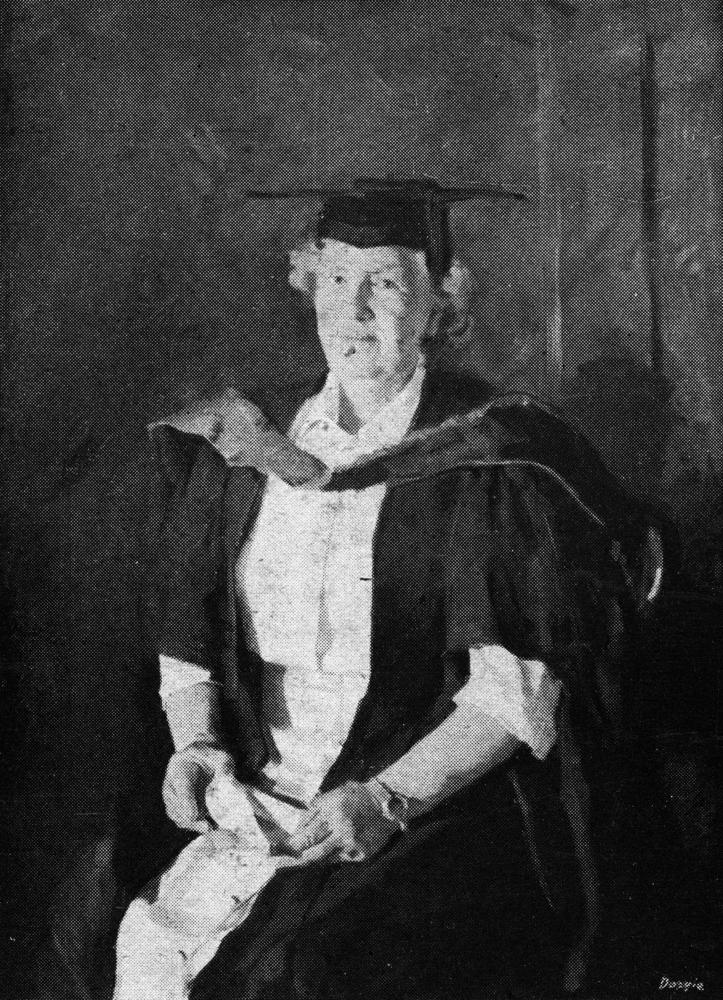
- 1949 Portrait
- Born: 11 April 1883
- Died: 23 October 1970 (aged 87)
- Title: Principal of UQ Women's College

Academic background
- Education: Oxford High School
- Alma mater: University of Melbourne

Academic work
- Discipline: Biology
- Institutions: University of Queensland

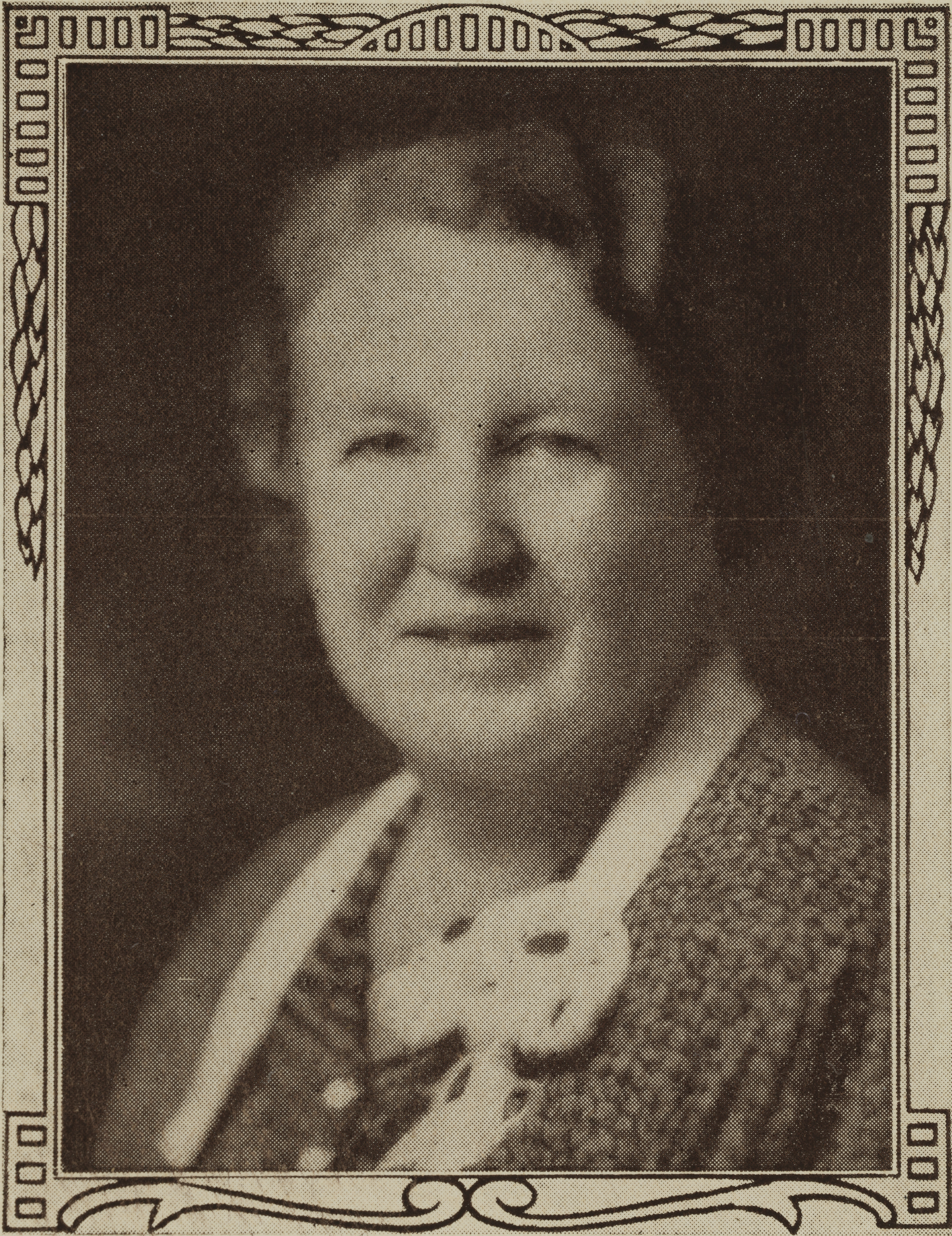
Portrait of Bage in 1939

Anna Frederika (Freda) Bage OBE (11 April 1883 – 23 October 1970) was an Australian biologist, university professor and principal and women's activist. Bage was born in 1883 and studied at Oxford High School for girls and Fairlight School. In 1907, Bage received her Masters of Science from the University of Melbourne and began an extensive career. Bage worked as a junior demonstrator in Biology and in 1908 won the King's College scholarship and in 1909 travelled to London working under Arthur Dendy which led Bage receiving a fellowship by the Linnean Society in 1910–11. Bage returned to the University of Melbourne where she worked as a senior demonstrator and in 1913 she was offered a job at the University of Queensland where she became a biology lecturer. On 8 February 1914 Bage became the first principal of The Women's College within the University of Queensland, which she held for 32 years. In 1928–29, Bage was president of the Australian Federation of University Women (A.F.U.W.), which names a scholarship in her honour, representing it at several conferences of the International Federation of University Women. In 1941, Bage was appointed Order of the British Empire (OBE) and in 1946 she retired. Freda Bage died in 1970 in Brisbane from cerebral arteriosclerosis.

== Early life ==
Freda Bage was born on 11 April 1883 to Victoria, a wholesale chemist in Felton, Grimwade & Co., and his wife Mary Charlotte at St Kilda. Following her father's death in July 1891, Freda's mother took her and her two siblings to England where Bage was enrolled in the Oxford High School for girls. Upon returning to Melbourne in 1894, Bage went to Fairlight School. Inspired by her father's enthusiasm for science, in 1901 she began to study at the University of Melbourne. After failing first year, she graduated with a Bachelor of Science in 1905 and Masters of Science in 1907.

== Career ==
After she received her Masters of Science from the University of Melbourne in 1907, Bage worked as a junior demonstrator in Biology under the MacBain Research Scholarship and in 1908 she won a research scholarship from the Victorian Government in 1908. In 1909, she travelled to London on a King's College research scholarship where she worked under Arthur Dendy, a zoologist at the college, which led to a fellowship by the Linnean Society in 1910–11. Bage returned to the University of Melbourne where she worked as a senior demonstrator and in 1913 she was offered a job at the University of Queensland where she became a biology lecturer. She attended many of the early biology camps of the University of Queensland. On 8 February 1914 Bage became the first principal of The Women's College within the University of Queensland, which she held for 32 years. In 1915, her interest in biology and flora and fauna led her to become president of the Field Naturalists' Club and a founding member of the Barrier Reef committee. In 1923–1950, Bage became a member of the university senate.

Bage was concerned with the organisation of women in university so she led the formation of the Queensland Women Graduates' Association (later the Queensland Association of University Women). In 1928–29, Bage was president of the Australian Federation of University Women (A.F.U.W), which names a scholarship in her honour, representing it at several conferences of the International Federation of University Women. In 1941, Bage was appointed Order of the British Empire (OBE) and in 1946 she retired. Bage was in 1951 awarded an Honorary LL.D. by the University of Queensland, the first woman so honoured.

== Women activist ==
Freda Bage advocated widely for women's rights, she travelled around Queensland encouraging women to gain support and join her university. Freda Bage took a wide interest in women's organisations, groups and activities; she was an honorary member of the National Council of Women of Queensland, in 1916 she was president of the Women's Club and in 1922–23 Fred was president of the Lyceum Club, Brisbane. Bage was concerned with the organisation of women in university so she led the formation of the Queensland Women Graduates' Association (later the Queensland Association of University Women). In 1928–29, Bage was president of the Australian Federation of University Women (A.F.U.W), which names a scholarship in her honour, representing it at several conferences of the International Federation of University Women.

== Personal life ==
In World War I Bage was a member of the Queensland Recruiting Committee and in both wars was president of university women's war work groups. Bage was an original member of the National Art Galleries' Association, the Twelfth Night Theatre and the Brisbane Repertory Society. Because of her passion for hockey, she managed the first hockey team in Australia to travel interstate, from Melbourne to Adelaide in 1908, and was president of the Queensland Women's Hockey Association in 1925–1931. Bage was a nature enthusiast, a sponsor of the arts, a motor lover and a member of many women's sport teams.

Freda Bage died on 23 October 1970 in Brisbane from cerebral arteriosclerosis. Her will provided scholarships to schools in Melbourne, funds for the women's colleges in Melbourne and Queensland Universities and a memorial for her brother, who died at Gallipoli.

== Legacy ==
In addition to the Freda Bage fellowship, a stone grotesque was made of her by sculptor Rhyl Hinwood, and is featured within the University of Queensland Great Court. Bage is pictured behind a steering wheel, in acknowledgement of her passion for driving. Bage would act as driver to visiting Professors, transported ex-servicemen to and from hospitals after World War I, and in her retirement, travelled extensively within Australia.
