= Residential colleges of the University of Queensland =

There are eleven residential colleges of the University of Queensland.

== Colleges ==
=== Cromwell College ===
Cromwell College
- University of Queensland
- Location: 27°29′51.21″S 153°00′29.59″E
- Full name: Cromwell College
- Motto: Ubi spiritus, ibi libertas (Latin)
- Motto in English: Where the spirit is, there is liberty
- Established: 1954
- Named for: Oliver Cromwell
- Gender: Co-educational since 1973, formerly male only
- Principal: Simon Armstrong
- Residents: 248
- Website: Homepage; Alumni Homepage

- On the St Lucia campus. Was the first of the Colleges on the St Lucia campus in June 1954, and admitted men only until it became co-ed in 1973.

=== Duchesne College ===
Duchesne College
- University of Queensland
- Location: 27.5017°S 153.0162°E
- Full name: Duchesne College
- Motto: Robur in luce veritatis (Latin)
- Motto in English: Strength in the light of truth
- Established: 1937
- Named for: Rose Philippine Duchesne
- Gender: Female only
- Principal: Michelle Allan
- President: Madison Powell (2026)
- Residents: 212
- Website: Homepage; Alumni Homepage

=== Emmanuel College ===
Emmanuel College
- University of Queensland
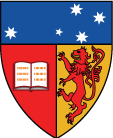
- Location: St Lucia Campus; 27.4977°S 153.0082°E
- Full name: Emmanuel College
- Motto: Fiat Lux (Latin)
- Motto in English: Let there be light
- Established: 1911
- Gender: Co-educational since 1975, formerly male only
- Principal: Stephen Peake
- President: Emmanuel (Manny) Kelly (2025)
- Residents: 361
- Website: Homepage; Alumni Homepage

=== Grace College ===
Grace College
- University of Queensland
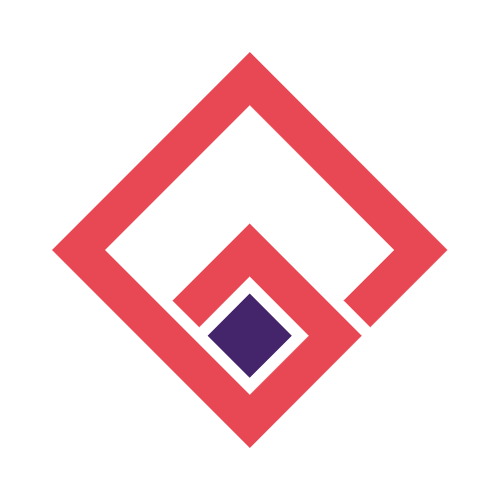
- Location: 27.49746°S 153.00708°E
- Motto in English: My Grace is Sufficient (2 Cor. 12:9)
- Established: 1970
- Gender: Gender inclusive
- Principal: Peter Walker
- President: Caitlyn Avery (2024)
- Residents: 125
- Website: www.grace.uq.edu.au

=== Gatton Halls of Residence ===
The Halls of Residence
- University of Queensland
- Location: 27.5409°S 152.3261°E; College Halls: Pitt, Riddell, Shelton and Thynne
- Full name: The Halls of Residence
- Motto: Una Adolescamus (Latin)
- Motto in English: Together We Grow
- Established: 1897
- Named for: Queensland Agricultural College
- Gender: Co-educational
- Residents: 436
- Website: Homepage; Alumni

- Main university residential facilities for the Gatton campus.
- Largest residential college associated with the University of Queensland
- Established in 1897 making it the oldest college with the University of Queensland
- 436 rooms
- Students at the Halls mainly study within the Faculty of Science
- Divided into four Halls: Shelton, Pitt, Thynne and Riddell

=== International House ===
International House
- University of Queensland
- Location: 27°29′47.67″S 153°00′32.53″E
- Full name: International House
- Motto: That Brotherhood May Prevail (Latin)
- Established: 1965
- Named for: International House organisation
- Gender: Co-educational
- President: Dr Carla Tromans
- Residents: 238
- Website: Homepage; Alumni Homepage

- Founded in 1965. Planning for the college commenced in 1955 through the Rotary Club of Brisbane and as part of the celebrations to mark the 50th anniversary of Rotary International.

=== King's College ===
King's College
- University of Queensland
- Location: 27.5029°S 153.0083°E
- Full name: King's College
- Motto: Veritas vos liberabit (Latin)
- Motto in English: The truth will set you free
- Established: 1912
- Named for: King's College, Cambridge
- Master: Donald Markwell
- President: Isaac Burke (2026)
- Residents: 317
- Website: Homepage; Alumni

=== St John's College ===
St John's College
- University of Queensland
- Location: 27°30′02″S 153°00′51″E
- Full name: St John's College
- Motto: Esolutus iterum vinctus (Latin)
- Motto in English: Freed and Rebound
- Established: 1911
- Named for: St John the Evangelist
- Gender: Co-educational since 1990, formerly male only
- Warden: Ms Rose Alwyn
- President: Abigail Crocker (2026)
- Residents: 322
- Website: Homepage; Alumni Homepage

=== St Leo's College ===
St Leo's College
- University of Queensland
- Location: St. Lucia
- Full name: St Leo's College
- Motto: Dominus Illuminatio Mea (Latin)
- Motto in English: The lord is my light
- Established: 1917
- Named for: St Leo the Great
- Gender: Men only
- Sister college: Duchesne College
- Rector: Steve Foley
- President: Fletcher Lloyd (2026)
- Residents: 212
- Website: Homepage; Alumni Homepage

St Leo's was founded by Brisbane's Catholic Archbishop Sir James Duhig in 1917 and is named in honour of St Leo the Great – the first Pope Leo (440 AD to 461 AD).

The college celebrated its centenary in 2017.

The college operates a catering business.

The Student Club conducts the Annual Duhig Lecture in the second semester of the university calendar. Notable speakers of have included John Howard, Prime Minister of Australia, Peter Beattie, Premier of Queensland, Malcolm Fraser, former Prime Minister of Australia, Peter Garrett, politician and former musician, Chris Masters journalist and Alan Jones (radio broadcaster and one-time Wallabies coach).

==== Rectors of the college ====
- Steve Foley 2014
- Br Vince Skelly cfc 2004–2013
- Lt Col John Long (retired) 2001–2003
- Fr William Uren SJ AO 1998–2000
- Fr Gregory Jordan SJ 1992–1997
- Fr Michael Head SJ 1991
- Fr Gerry Healy SJ 1989–1990
- Fr Vincent Hurley SJ 1977–1988
- Fr Brian Fleming SJ 1967–1977

==== Notable alumni ====
- Hugh Wirth AM. Australia Day Ambassador 2013

=== Union College ===
Union College
- University of Queensland
- Location: 27°29′47.5″S 153°00′26.3″E
- Full name: Union College
- Motto: Nemo me impune lacessit (Latin)
- Motto in English: No one wounds me with impunity
- Established: 1964
- Named for: UQ Union
- Gender: Co-educational
- Head: Fiona Hawthorne
- President: Jared Rice (2024 - present)
- Residents: 334
- Website: Homepage; Alumni Homepage

- Union College is the only one of the university's colleges to be heritage-listed, having been added to the Queensland Heritage Register in 2004.

=== The Women's College ===
The Women's College
- University of Queensland
- Location: 27.5013°S 153.0173°E
- Full name: The Women's College
- Motto: Capimus ut dividamus (Latin)
- Motto in English: We take so that we may share
- Established: 1914
- Named for: See 'Admission'
- Gender: Female only
- Head of College and Chief Executive: Florence Kearney
- President: Aurelia Furey (2026)
- Residents: 255
- Website: Homepage; Alumni Homepage

The Women's College was founded in 1913 and it admitted 19 women residents on 16 March 1914. Anna Frederica Bage was the first principal. This was the first University of Queensland college to admit women. There are currently 250 undergraduates and postgraduate women residents within the college. Notable alumnae include Harriet Elizabeth Marks, Penelope Wensley, Anna Bligh, and Sallyanne Atkinson.
