= Emmanuel College, University of Queensland =

Emmanuel College
- University of Queensland
- Location: St Lucia Campus; 27.4977°S 153.0082°E
- Full name: Emmanuel College
- Motto: Fiat Lux (Latin)
- Motto in English: Let there be light
- Established: 1911
- Gender: Co-educational since 1975, formerly male only
- Principal: Mr Stephen Peake
- Residents: 340
- Website: Homepage; Alumni Homepage

Emmanuel College (commonly called EMC) is the largest residential college of Australia's University of Queensland, located on its St Lucia campus. Affiliated with the Uniting Church, it provides co-educational accommodation, academic and wellbeing support for 340 undergraduate and postgraduate students of Brisbane's leading tertiary institutions (University of Queensland, Queensland University of Technology, and Griffith University). Emmanuel College offers scholarships and bursaries to financially assist students to complete their studies while living in college.

== History ==
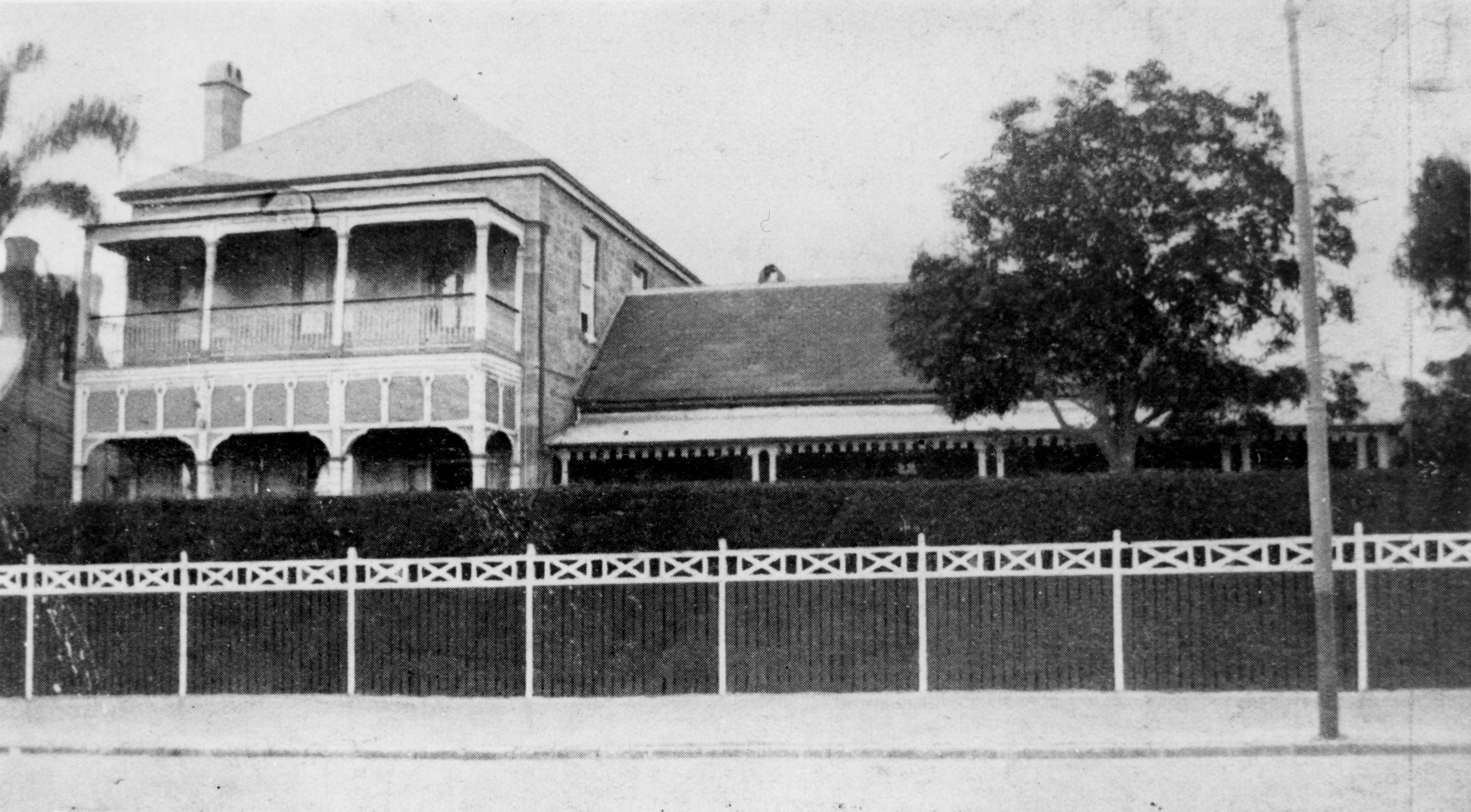
Emmanuel College, Wickham Terrace, 1930

Emmanuel College was founded by the Queensland Presbyterian Church in 1911, with an all-male cohort first taking up residence in 1912 in its original location on Brisbane CBD's Wickham Terrace (the now heritage-listed St Andrews War Memorial Hospital Administration Building). It is Australia's ninth residential university college, and the first of the University of Queensland.

In 1955, the College relocated to its present site on Sir William MacGregor Drive on the St Lucia campus of the University of Queensland.

In 1977 when the Methodist, Congregational and parts of the Presbyterian Church joined together to become the new Uniting Church in Australia (UCA), Emmanuel College came under the auspices of both the UCA and the remaining Presbyterian Churches in Queensland. The Uniting Church continues its involvement now through the appointment of several college board members through the constitution of the College.

Women were admitted as Collegians in 1975 and the College maintains a 50:50 male to female resident ratio.

2011 marked the College's centenary.

2021 will mark the College's 110 year anniversary.

== College layout ==
Emmanuel is divided into 12 buildings, or "wings", named after influential people in the College's history. Each wing acts as a smaller community within the wider College environment, which arranges communal events and provides a familial, supportive environment.

The College consists of ten co-educational undergraduate wings:

1. Edmonds
2. Busch
3. Douglas
4. Drewe
5. Gibson
6. Glaister
7. Henderson
8. Martin
9. Meiklejohn
10. Merrington

The remaining residence is a wing composed of flats for senior and postgraduate students;

1. 2nd Residential

There is also a wing composed of flats available for covid-affected residents providing a place for isolation.

1. McGregor

== Extra-curricular involvement ==
=== Pipe Band ===
Emmanuel College founded the university-wide pipe band in 1998. Following the merger of two of Queensland's most recognised pipe bands – The University of Queensland Pipe Band at Emmanuel College and the Queensland Highlanders Pipe Band – the Emmanuel College Highlanders at The University of Queensland formed in 2016. Band membership is open to all members of the College and the University, including staff and alumni, and people from the wider community.

=== Sporting ===
Emmanuel students compete in a variety of individual and team sporting activities against the other 10 Brisbane-located residential colleges of the University of Queensland as part of the Inter-College Competition (ICC). The College upholds a tradition of strong performance in competing for the Men's Old Collegian's Cup and the Women's ICC Sports Shield, despite having lower resident numbers per gender than single-sex colleges. In 2019, Emmanuel placed third in both men's and women's sport.

The College hosts an annual Sports Dinner, where the accomplishments of Emmanuel residents in the ICC are recognised and celebrated.

Emmanuel hosts an annual Rugby 7s tournament in which university teams participate in a weekend of competition on the UQ campus.

=== Cultural ===
As part of the Inter-College Competition (ICC), Emmanuel competes in debating, College Idol, Bandfest, art show, Choralfest, oratory, One Act Play, chess and Dancefest. In 2019 (equal 1st with St John's), 2017 and 2016 Emmanuel won the coveted ICC Cultural Cup, its 2016 victory coming on the back of a clean sweep of the three most heavily weighted competitions: Bandfest, Choralfest and Dancefest. Emmanuel also won the Cultural Cup in 2013 and 2009.

The College hosts an annual Theatre Restaurant, an entirely student-run musical with a three-course dinner.
