= Queensland Housing Commission =

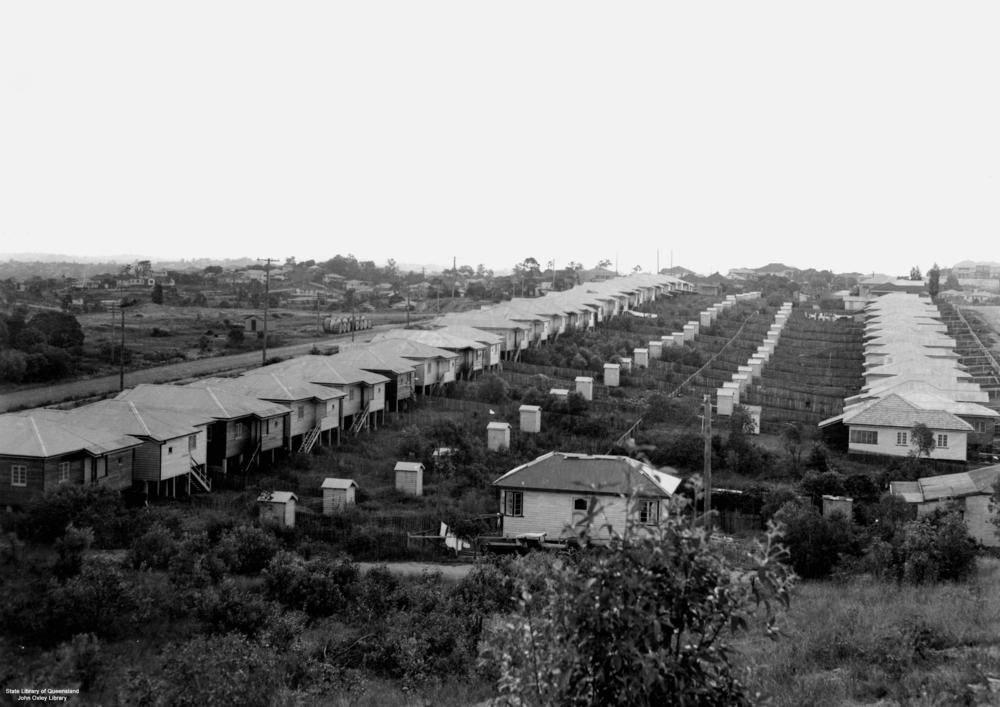
- Commission houses in Norman Park

Agency overview
- Formed: 1945
- Dissolved: 2004
- Type: Housing provision
- Jurisdiction: Queensland
- Headquarters: Brisbane
- Key document: State Housing Act 1945

The Queensland Housing Commission was a Queensland Government agency which was established in 1945 under the State Housing Act 1945. The agency aimed to improve the lives of individuals and families by providing access to secure, affordable and appropriate housing.

One of the earliest and biggest projects undertaken by the Commission was a detached housing estate in Inala. In the Brisbane suburb of Stafford a significant number of post-war Queensland Housing Commission homes were built on quarter-acre blocks in the 1940s and 1950s.

After the Second World War, the Imported Homes Scheme was initiated and funded by the Federal government. Together with French contractors 886 prefabricated homes were built in the Brisbane suburb of Zillmere.

In 1981, the first residence to cater for the needs of people with a disability was adapted.

In 2004 the Commission was abolished, with the Department of Housing taking over its role under the Housing Act 2003.

== See also ==
- Public housing in Australia
