= Frank T. M. White =

Australian mineral engineer and educator (1909–1971)

Frank White FGS FIM FIMM FIMinE FAusIMM FGSA FCIM

Personal details
- Born: Frank Thomas Matthews White; 16 September 1909 Northcote, Victoria, Australia
- Died: 26 November 1971 Montreal, Quebec, Canada
- Education: Melbourne High School
- Alma mater: University of Melbourne
- Occupation: Mining engineer; metallurgical engineer; researcher; educator

Military service
- Allegiance: British Empire
- Branch/service: Fiji Defence Force
- Years of service: 1942–1949
- Rank: Platoon Commander
- Battles/wars: World War II; Solomon Islands Campaign; Malayan Emergency

Frank Thomas Matthews White (16 September 1909 – 26 November 1971) was an Australian mineral engineering educator. His career included roles in Australia, Fiji, Malaysia, and Canada. Following industry appointments in Australia, he established the Fiji Department of Mines, lead the post-War rehabilitation of Malayan tin mines, founded the Department of Mining and Metallurgical Engineering at University of Queensland (UQ), was instrumental in founding International House, University of Queensland, and chaired the Department of Mining Engineering and Applied Geophysics at McGill University, Canada.

== Education and Qualifications ==
Frank White was born in Northcote, Victoria, Australia, son of Edith (née Matthews) and Frank Kenworthy White, Justice of the Peace, councillor and mayor of the City of Kew, Victoria: 1932–33 and 1945–46.

White attended Melbourne High School. Awarded a Free Place Scholarship (1927–30), he enrolled in the University of Melbourne to pursue a Bachelor of Metallurgical Engineering degree B.Met.E., conferred in 1931. He received Mining and Metallurgical Bursaries from 1928 to 1930, and the Students' Lecture Prize in 1929. In 1936, he earned the Certificate of Competency as an Underground Superintendent (WA Mines Regulations Act of 1906). In 1946, he qualified through the British system as a Magistrate, First-Class in the field of mining law. In 1950, he was awarded a Bachelor of Mining Engineering degree B.E.(Min) ad eundem gradum, from the University of Queensland. In 1951, he was awarded a Nuffield Foundation Fellowship, and in 1957 a Carnegie Fellowship. A Fellow of the Geological Society of London (FGS), and Fellow of the Institution of Metallurgists (FIM), he was also a member of other professional societies, including the Institution of Mining and Metallurgy (London), Institution of Mining Engineers (London), Australian Institute of Metals (President 1953), Australasian Institute of Mining and Metallurgy, Geological Society of Australia, Royal Society of Queensland, Canadian Institute of Mining and Metallurgy, the American Institute of Mining and Metallurgical Engineers, and Société de l'industrie minérale.

== Career ==
=== Gold Mining and Milling, Western Australia ===
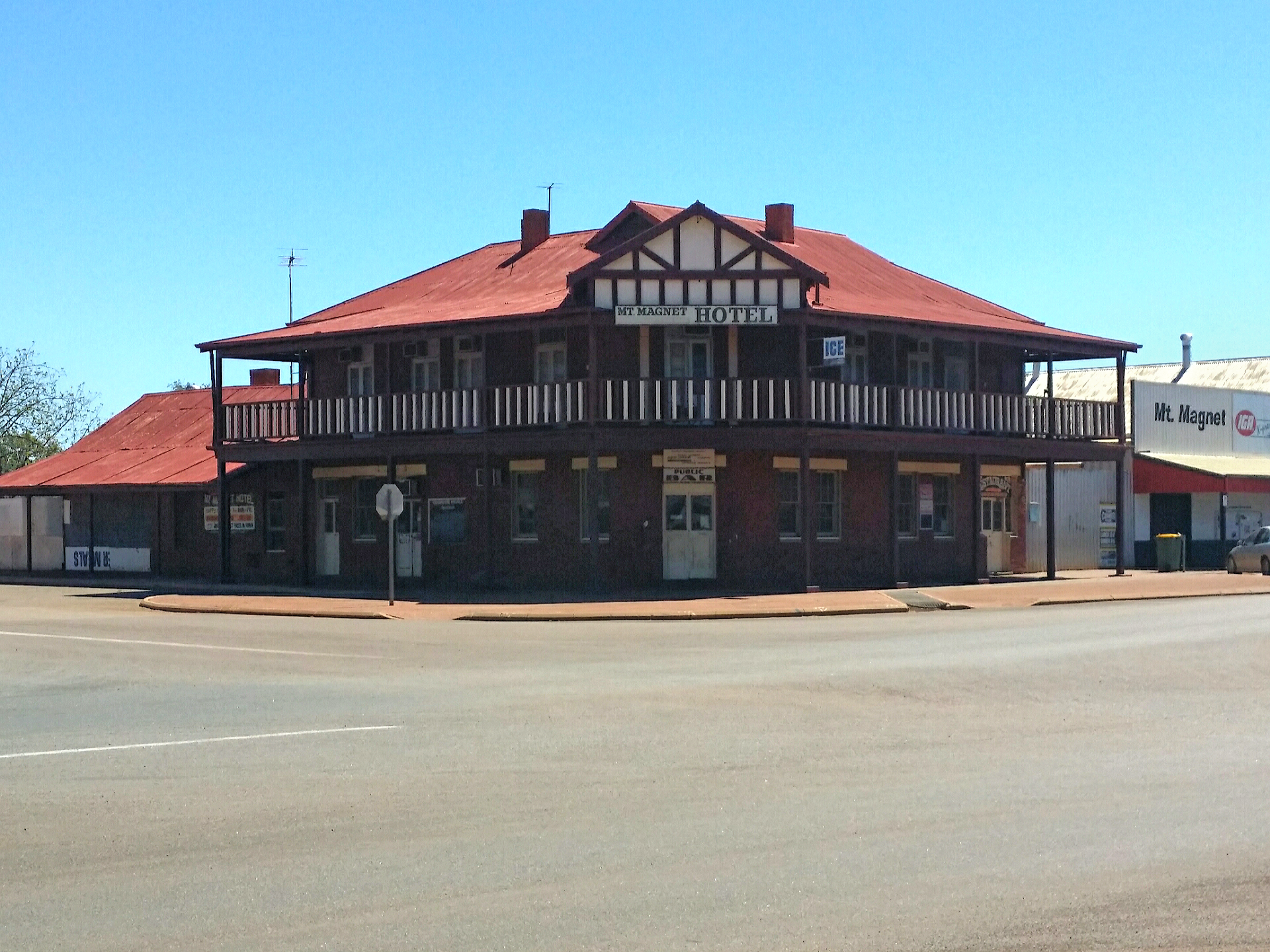
The Venerable Mount Magnet Hotel

In 1931, Frank TM White was appointed by Wiluna Gold Mines Ltd, 500 kilometers north of Kalgoorlie, Western Australia;as chief metallurgical chemist, he conducted research into and managed mineral processing; he also served as a deputy mine geologist for two years (1933–35). In 1935, he was appointed Assistant Manager and Mill Superintendent of Mount Magnet Gold Mines. At Mount Magnet (Hill 50) he earned the Certificate of Competency as underground superintendent (WA Mines Regulations Act of 1906), and became a Registered Mine Manager at 27 years of age, the youngest person to obtain this certification at the time. In early 1937, he contracted as general manager of a start-up Australian mining company, Edjudina Consolidated Gold Mines Ltd. He resigned later that year to take up a post in Fiji in 1937 with His Majesty's Colonial Mines Service.

=== Setting up a Department of Mines, Fiji ===
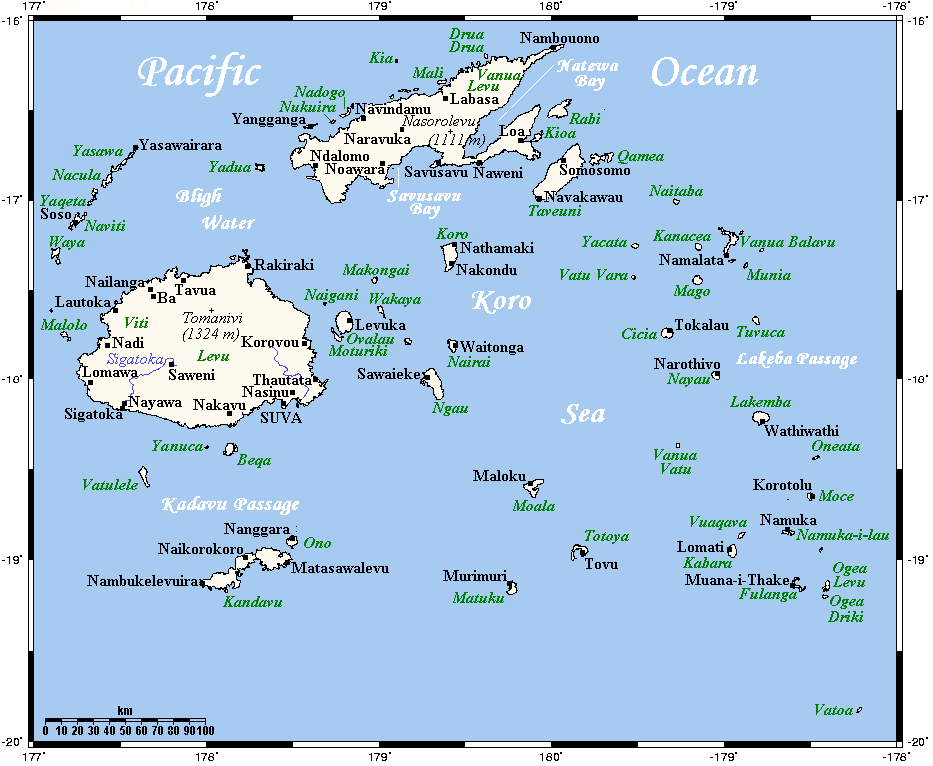
The Fiji Islands

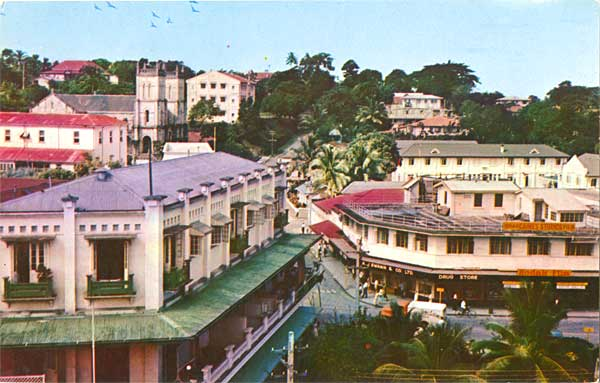
Suva Business District c. 1940s

In 1934, a mining ordinance to regulate a fledgling industry (initially at Vatukoula) was introduced by the British Colonial Administration in Fiji. As the Ordinance called for a Mines Inspectorate, H.M. Colonial Mines Service recruited Frank TM White to set up Fiji's Mines Department in Suva. In addition to developing legislation and implementing inspections, by 1939 White (as Inspector of Mines) initiated and developed a geological survey of Viti Levu, resulting in Fiji's first geological survey map, published in 1943. Known colloquially as "White's Map", this remained the accepted geological representation until at least the mid-1950s.

Shortly following his arrival in Fiji, he became a founding member of the Fiji Society of Science and Industry and served as its president during the war years. He published papers on "Prospecting in Fiji", and on "Volcanic Activity and Related Phenomena in Fiji". He served on the board of trustees of the Fiji Museum, with a special interest in paleontology.

In May 1942, in addition to his governmental duties, White joined the Fiji Defence Force (FDF). Since the outbreak of World War II in November 1939, FDF had operated within the command structure of the New Zealand Defence Force. However, following the onset of the Pacific War in December 1941, during 1942 the FDF was transferred to US command (37th Infantry Division) and renamed the Fiji Military Force (FMF). As a special platoon commander, he was now assigned responsibility for training military engineers in explosive demolition methods and related preparations. For his FDF/FMF service, he was later awarded the Defence Medal (United Kingdom).

=== Rehabilitation of Tin Mining, Malaya ===
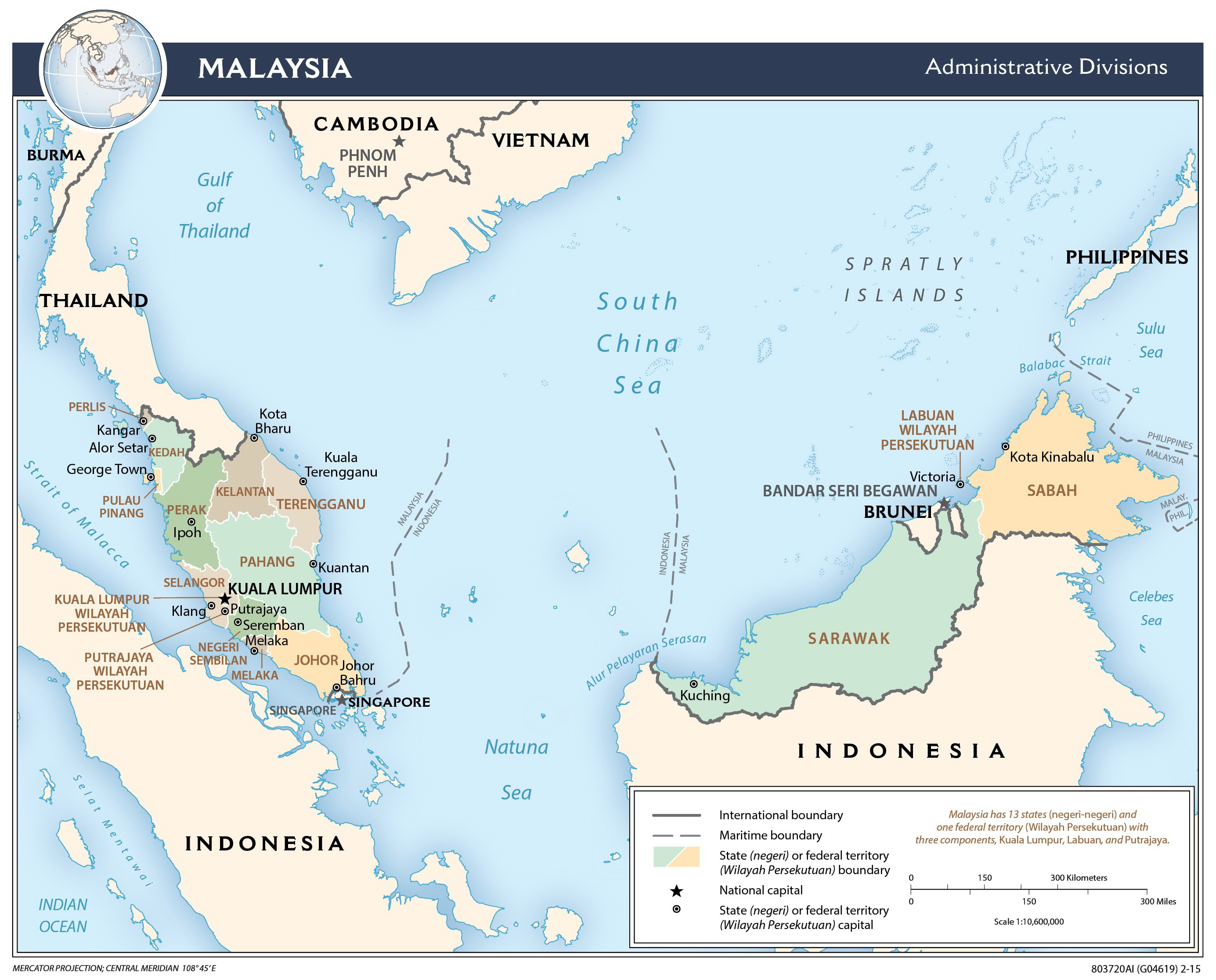
Malaysia: its states and neighbours.

In 1945, Frank TM White was posted to Malaya as a civilian with the British Military Administration. He was engaged primarily in rehabilitation of the tin mines, and writing mining law. His assignment was to address the impact of the scorched earth policy which had rendered many mines inoperable. Given its enormous economic importance, this required immediate attention to tin mining. He traveled to mining districts to inspect their state of repair and developed a scheme for the return of equipment from Japanese centres of utilisation. Military administration ended in March 1946, and White's post reverted to H.M. Colonial Mines Service where his role called upon his knowledge of mining law, policies and practices. To adjudicate on legal matters, he qualified as a Magistrate in the field of mining law, with responsibility for a Warden's Court. He developed policy documents to guide mining practices. He reported on specific regions, such as the Borneo Territories, and at times administered the mining industries of Selangor, Negri Sembilan and Malacca, three of the principal mining states of the Malayan Federation (which came into being on 1 February 1948, as successor to the initial Malayan Union which had proven to be politically unsustainable). Times became more turbulent in 1948, with the onset of guerrilla warfare by the Malayan National Liberation Army, setting in motion what became known as the Malayan Emergency. Tin mines and rubber plantations were especially targeted, primarily because of their economic value and relative isolation. In 1949, while still based in Malaya, he served briefly as mining adviser to Siam, to appraise and advise on their post-war mining rehabilitation issues.

As measures of the effectiveness of this rehabilitation effort over the period 1946–1949, active mines increased from 219 to 660, national output from 8,432 to 54,910 tons, and export value from US$24.7 million to $261.4 million.

=== University of Queensland, Australia ===
Frank TM White was named as the founding professor of mining engineering at the University of Queensland (UQ) in 1950. He appointed an assistant lecturer in metallurgy, June McNicol, as the first member of academic staff, in the following year. In 1952, on arrival of additional academic staff, the department expanded to become the Department of Mining and Metallurgical Engineering. The core faculty had grown to include, in addition to White and McNicol: CE Gregory, senior lecturer in mining engineering, J Waring, senior lecturer in metallurgy, O Paterson, lecturer in mining engineering, LM Hogan, lecturer in physical metallurgy, and WR Bull, lecturer in mineral dressing. Faculty from other Engineering departments also made vital contributions to the teaching program, as did several from other faculties, including Surveying and Medicine. Guest lectures were contributed by individuals based in government and from industry. There were also well qualified technical staff. Teaching programs developed within the first decade were introduced in the following sequence: 1950 – mining engineering degree B.E.(Min); 1953 – metallurgical engineering degree B.E(Met); 1957 – metallurgy as a major track for the BSc degree program B.Sc.(Met); 1958 – a master's degree in engineering science M.Eng.Sc.; 1959 – first enrollment for a departmental Ph.D. degree. By 1962, M.E and M.Sc. programs were defined, as were two new doctoral streams, D.E. and D.Sc.

In 1951, White took up the Queensland government's offer to lease the Silver Mine at Indooroopilly (formerly Finney's Hill United Silver Mines Limited), to be used as a teaching and research facility. Close examination of mine survey plans (initialed and dated) reflect his seminal role as the architect for this transformation. Under his leadership, the Queensland University Experimental Mine was promptly recognized as an integral part of the educational and research capacity of the school. It played an important role in the implementation of the Colombo Plan for staff training for the mineral industries of South-East Asia, and for the university as a whole was considered a "great success". Much of the rehabilitation of old workings was done as a means of providing training in mine rehabilitation for personnel from countries which lacked facilities for at-the-face training. Being able to offer an on-site mining environment was then (and still is) a rare and distinguishing feature of mining education shared by only a small minority of mineral sciences institutions, such as the Colorado School of Mines, Edgar Experimental Mine, and Poland's Central Mining Institute, whose Barbara Experimental Mine is used for testing devices, equipment, materials and procedures in real underground conditions.

White was awarded a Nuffield Foundation travelling fellowship in 1951, which he used to visit the mining fields of Southern and East Africa, Belgian Congo, and India, with concurrent visits to Austria for the Queensland State Government and Cyprus at the request of Mount Morgan Ltd. In addition, during this year, he made visits to mining centers in Queensland, including Mt Isa, Herberton, Mt Garnet and Mt Morgan. White was a recipient of the Coronation Medal in 1953. In this year he served as president, The Australian Institute of Metals (A.I.M.); he was state president in 1952 and in 1960. At A.I.M. conferences, he contributed scholarly papers on the antiquity of metallurgy, and its development over the ages; these works on the history of metals were subsequently published. He was awarded the A.I.M.'s Taylor Memorial Medal for metallurgical achievement in 1958. He was an active member of the Australasian Institute of Mining and Metallurgy, where he made scholarly contributions, including a paper on the history of coal production and use. In 1957, the International Geophysical Year, Professor White was awarded a Carnegie Fellowship (Grant in Aid), for which he took study leave in the interests of mining and metallurgical education, research and related developments in Western Europe, the United Kingdom, and North America (the US and Canada).

Frank White was effective in mobilising resources for the department and its experimental mine. In addition to general operating funds from UQ, numerous firms associated with the minerals industry provided generous grants or in-kind support. At the close of the decade, note was made of: Atlas Copco, Australian Wire and Rope Works, Balgowan Collieries, Commonwealth Industrial Gases, Crossle & Cameron Industries, Dowty Equipment, Etudes et Enterprises, Evans Deakin & Co., Donald Fraser Esc., Golden Plateau, Holman Bros., MR Hornibrooke, Huwood Co., Mount Isa Mines Ltd, Mount Morgan Ltd, Parbury Henty & Co., and Zinc Corporation. The first grant specifically for research was attracted from the Queensland Coal Owners Association (a research officer post, 1955), followed by the Atomic Energy Commission (1956), Union Carbide Corporation (1957), and General Motors Holden (a research fellowship, 1958). On 31 October 1958, White delivered a major paper at a Symposium on Research organised by the Melbourne Branch of the Australasian Institute of Mining and Metallurgy, and hosted by the University of Melbourne; His paper (citing 90 references) provided a comprehensive framework for discussion on research in mining. Transformation of the experimental mine and of the department as a whole into a research intensive school was underway; ensuing years would witness a steady expansion of grant support.

In 1965, prior to taking up an appointment as a visiting professor at McGill University, Frank White presented an update on the Queensland University Experimental Mine at the 8th Commonwealth Mining and Metallurgical Congress. As published, this included photographs of the mainshaft headframe, mining research laboratory, experimental pilot plant (showing equipment, research laboratories and workshop), and an inclined tramway leading into the open cut, where jet piercing, a drill test rig, and inflammability station were located. Teaching, demonstration and research activities were reviewed. Mining research was identified in the following areas: jet piercing, ventilation network analysis, noise abatement, explosives research, soil mechanics, aerodynamics of shaft design, human comfort studies (heat and ventilation), and rock mechanics. With regard to mineral dressing research, reference was made to comminution, mineral breakage, particle size control, and flotation kinetics. Regarding mineral processing and hydrometallurgy, mention is made of extraction of uranium values from refractory ores, solvent-in-pulp extraction of metal values, and solar heating of leaching circuits. Note was taken of the establishment of a Minerals Industries Research and Technical Service (M.I.R.T.S.) with activities assigned to five divisions: mining, ore testing, ceramics, industrial metallurgy, and analytics.

The unique developments that had taken place at the University Experimental Mine were later described in the following manner by UQ's first Librarian Harrison Bryan, in his 1966 essay on the history of the institution:

"dramatic was the University’s lease of an abandoned silver lead mine for practical work in connection with the newly established Department of Mining Engineering. This venture proved a great success, not only as to its immediate purpose, but also in the attraction of community attention and, perhaps even more importantly, Commonwealth funds

Bryan also made the following statement:

"Research, … finally came into its own in 1959 with a statement in the Senate by the Vice-Chancellor that it had reached such a volume that it could no longer be viewed as a sideline… highlighted by the awarding to the Physics department of an American Air Force contract… for space research, and by the initiation of mineral dressing investigations at the university mine

Frank T.M. White was instrumental in launching International House, University of Queensland. The vision for an International House was inspired by an address he made in October 1954, when he was serving as Warden for Overseas Students. The following extract from Professor White's address, delivered in the socio-political context of Queensland in the mid-1950s, reveals the philosophy behind a vision that remains relevant to the present.

... students from (other) countries… have brought with them their cultures, their philosophies, their national customs. These young men and women… can become ambassadors for Australia upon their return home. Their presence among us affords a unique opportunity for the promotion of international understanding: this is… a University and community responsibility.
… there are three understandings that we as a community can promote: … the values and cultures of other peoples;… the facts of world inter-dependence; (and) … the means by which the people of one country can live at peace with those of other countries.
These all involve an understanding of the roots of human behaviour, and of the need to explore ways of reconciling values which appear to conflict, and to devise means for training leaders ...

Planning commenced in 1955 through the Rotary Club of Brisbane, as part of the celebrations to mark the 50th anniversary of Rotary International. Professor White stepped down as Warden in December 1960. His seminal and sustaining contribution was acknowledged by Chancellor, Sir James Foots, who stated in 1992: "He was an enthusiastic supporter and fundraiser, and a very satisfied man when International House opened in 1965".

=== McGill University, Canada ===
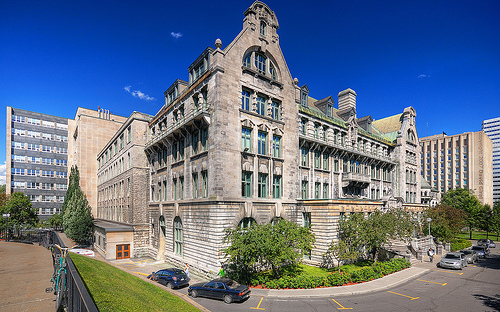
Macdonald Engineering Building

White moved to McGill University Faculty of Engineering in Canada in 1965 as a Visiting Professor and in the following year was appointed Macdonald Professor and Chair, Mining Engineering and Applied Geophysics, where he promoted and strengthened undergraduate and post-graduate education. Established in 1871, the mining engineering program at McGill University is the oldest in Canada, and the oldest of its kind in North America, followed closely by the one offered at Colorado School of Mines (established 1874). In the mid 1960s mining engineering at universities in Canada was suffering. The University of Toronto closed its school, and McGill University had only one undergraduate student and its Professor of Mining was due to retire. In 1964 John Ross Bradfield, Chairman of Noranda Inc., was asked to form a committee to study and resolve the problem. The result was the raising of funds to help finance a Chair of Mining at McGill, to fund a scholarship program, and to persuade Professor Frank T. M. White to come from the University of Queensland in Australia to take the position of Chairman of the Department of Mining Engineering and Applied Geophysics. Professor White initiated a program that graduated a large cohort of postgraduate engineers, many of whom served to rebuild the educational capacity of mining throughout Canada. This, together with the contribution he made in promoting mining education, resolved the crisis. In 1970 he received the distinguished lecturer award of the Canadian Institute of Mining and Metallurgy. White died in 1971 in Montreal; McGill University and the Canadian Mineral Industry Education Foundation set up an award, the F.T.M.White Scholarship, to honour him for his outstanding contribution to mining education in Canada.

== Personal life ==
Frank T.M. White married Tessie Marian Nunn (1906–1991) of Claremont, Western Australia in 1935, eldest daughter of Alice (née Walley) and George M Nunn, surveyor for Fremantle Harbour, the Goldfields Water Supply Scheme, and observations of the Solar Eclipse, 21 September 1922 at Wallal, to validate Einstein's Theory. "Tess" was a proficient landscape artist and pianist; Frank played violin, piano and organ. They had two children, Hilary White-Nunn (1941–2007), and Franklin White (1946-).

== Legacy ==
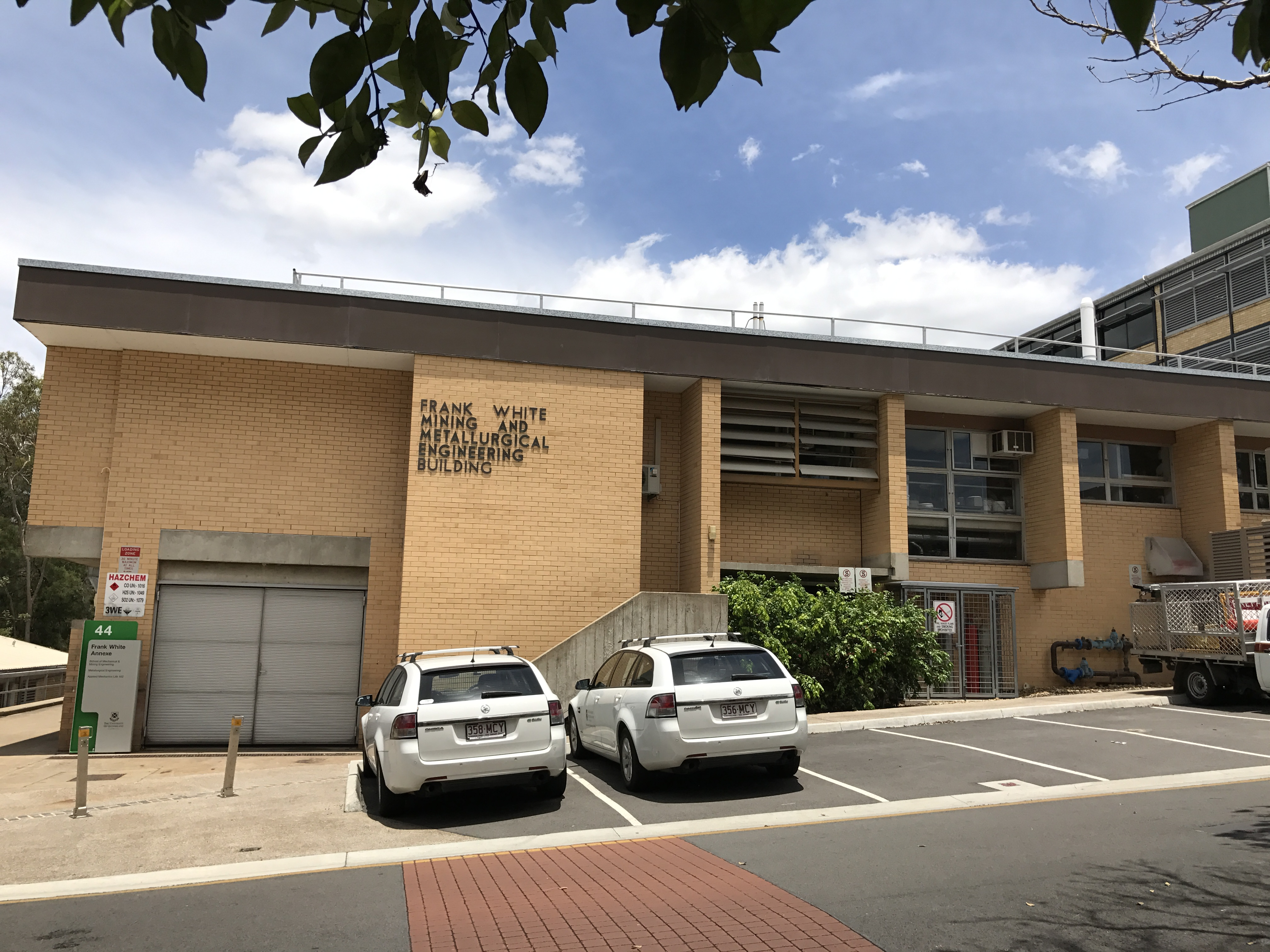
Frank White Building 44 UQ, St Lucia Campus

In 1970, Mount Isa Mines Ltd presented the Julius Kruttschnitt Mineral Research Centre (JKMRC) to UQ in honour of a former chairman of the board. In the same year, as a guest of the University of Queensland, Frank White delivered the Julius Kruttschnitt Lecture. Julius Kruttschnitt (1885–1974) was a close colleague and an active supporter of Frank White's efforts to bring quality mineral industry education and research to UQ since his appointment in 1950. JKMRC was to be based at the University Experimental Mine, and Alban Lynch named as its first director, a role he sustained until 1989. Lynch had been recruited by Frank White as a research officer in 1958, earning doctorates from UQ in 1965, and the University of New South Wales in 1975. While Professor Lynch was serving as head of the Department of Mining and Metallurgical Engineering from 1989 to 1993, the building housing the department at the St Lucia campus was named after Frank White (demolished 2018). At UQ also, an annual student prize, the Frank T.M. White prize, is awarded "on the basis of the qualities of scholastic attainment and high standard of character and service." At JKMRC, a minecart mounted on a rock cairn bears the inscription: "In recognition of F.T.M. White Foundation Professor or Mining and Metallurgical Engineering, University of Queensland." It goes on to state "The establishment of Queensland Experimental Mine and the development of research facilities at this site were due to his vision and enthusiasm." On 28 June 2022, UQ named the Frank White Memorial Garden within the UQ Engineering precinct. On 28 September 2023, UQ launched the Frank White Memorial Lecture with a keynote addressing "a perspective on the role of Mineral Engineering in the world today".

The Canadian Mineral Industry Education Foundation set up an award in his name to recognize his contribution to mining education in Canada.
