= John Lundie Michie =

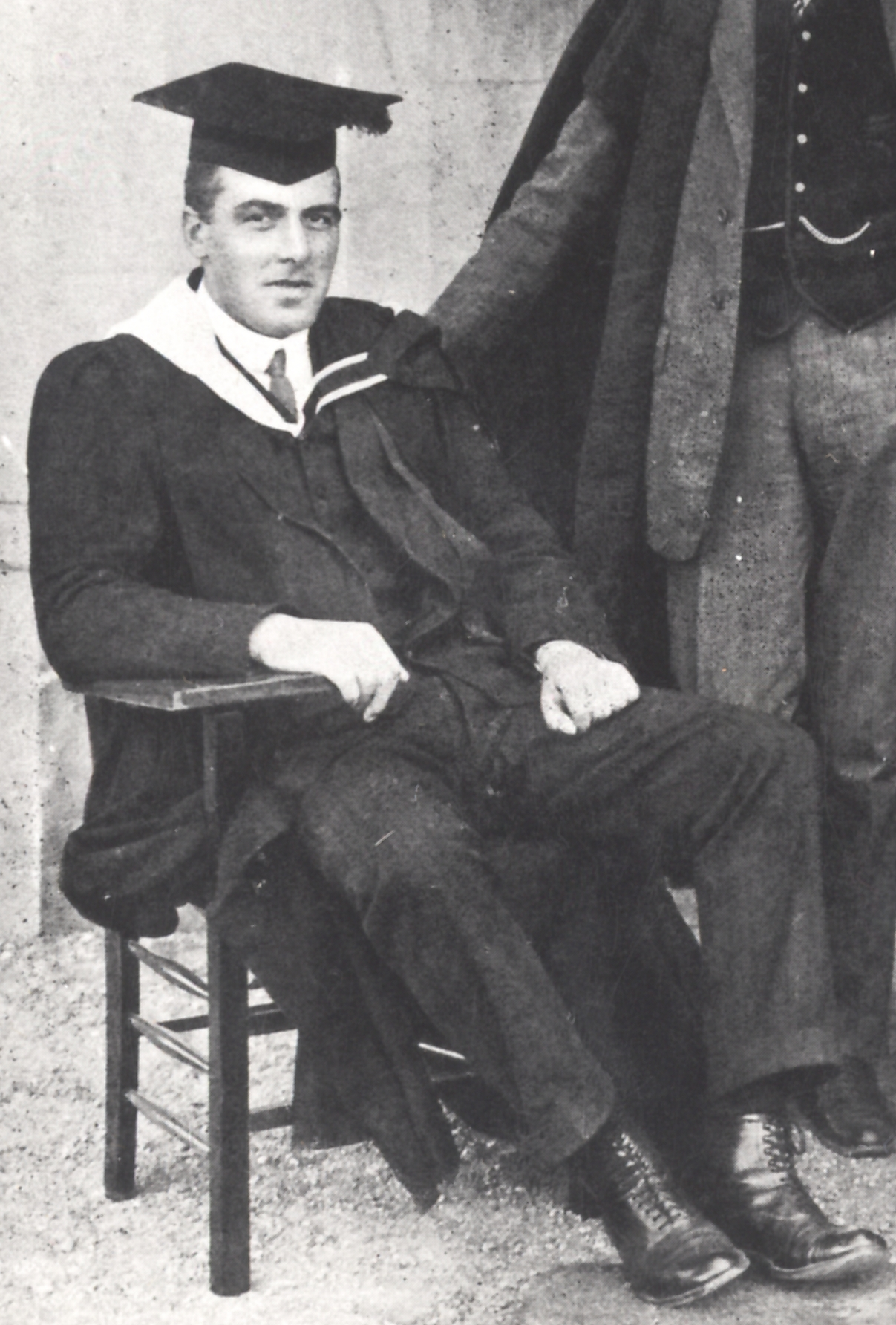
- Professor John Lundie Michie, 3 April 1911
- Born: June 4, 1882; Lochnalair, Crathie, Aberdeenshire, Scotland
- Died: June 23, 1946 (aged 64); Ascot, Brisbane, Queensland, Australia

Academic background
- Education: University of Aberdeen, Trinity College, Cambridge

Academic work
- Discipline: Classics

John Lundie Michie (1882–1946) was the first professor of Classics at the University of Queensland in Brisbane, Queensland, Australia.

== Early life ==
John Lundie Michie was born on 4 June 1882 in Lochnalair, Crathie, Aberdeenshire, Scotland. He attended Robert Gordon's College in Aberdeen, Scotland winning a Classics Gold Medal in 1899. He graduated with an M.A. and first class honours in classics in 1904 from the University of Aberdeen. He was awarded the Ferguson classical scholarship in his final year at Aberdeen. He was an equally enthusiastic athlete as he was a scholar, with skills in the hammer and shot put, and in mountaineering.

He would continue his studies at Trinity College, Cambridge, earning a double first in the classical Tripos and his B.A. from Cambridge in 1907. This would be followed by his M.A. in 1911.

== Career ==
In 1908, Michie returned to the University of Aberdeen, and became an assistant to the Professor of Humanity, Sir William Ramsay. He would become lecturer in Roman history at Cambridge in 1909.

In 1910, Michie applied for and was appointed to the chair in Classics at the newly established University of Queensland in Brisbane, Australia. He would travel to Australia with another of the new appointments, Henry Priestley and his wife. Both Priestley and Michie would become strong supporters of the athletics events of the new University. Michie's presence at the university occurred at a key time in debate within the Queensland government and the university's establishment, as he and then Governor Sir William MacGregor would take the side of recommending that classics be a prerequisite for enrolment in the Arts program. Others would take the line that this was not appropriate to the needs of a modern Queensland. Michie was kept busy in his first years at the university, designing the Classics Honour program and doing much of the teaching of classes. His design of the courses in Classics would remain the template for the next 40 years. His nickname was "Michie Mouse", in reference to his quiet nature rather than stature, as he was very tall and had trouble fitting around tables during class. His shy nature and lack of confidence in public speaking was noticed, but he was generally thought of as the "rock" of the university.

Michie would become chairman (1911–1922) and dean of the Faculty of Arts (1928–1932 and again 1939–1946), a member of the University Senate (1916–1923 and 1926–1932) and president of the Board of Faculties (1917–1922), demonstrating his commitment to the administration and teaching of the new University. He was well liked by his students, being kind, courteous and shy, but rarely spoke at public events, and had little time to publish. He did give public lectures in the 1920s on Greece, Rome and Crete. His energies were directed entirely at his teaching and administrative duties. He and fellow Professors Alcock and Lusby were also involved in the university's extension courses in 1922, offered at five shillings a meeting.

Michie sat on the Library Committee, which struggled to achieve the funding needed to improve the library's facilities. In 1935, he was awarded an honorary Doctor of Laws for his service to the university. He was also president of the UQ Athletic Club and a judge at many events.

In February 1946, Michie took leave from the university due to ill health. He died 23 June 1946.

== Personal life ==
Michie married Isabella Sword in 1926 in the Presbyterian Church of Stanthorpe, Queensland. He was survived by his wife and two daughters.

== Legacy ==
Michie left an estate of £33,753, and from this bequests were made to the University of Queensland and University of Aberdeen. The J.L. Michie memorial scholarship fund was created by former students and colleagues to benefit honours students in classics, and prizes continue to be offered today. The Michie building, a building that faces the Great Court of the University of Queensland was named for him in the 1970s, in recognition of his dedication to humanities and classics in particular. It features the RD Milns Antiquities Museum and the UQ Anthropology Museum. A stone grotesque in his likeness was also carved in the university's Great Court. Two of his most distinguished students included writer, Jack Lindsay and Eric Partridge.
