= Henry Priestley (mathematician) =

British mathematician (1883-1932)

Henry James Priestley
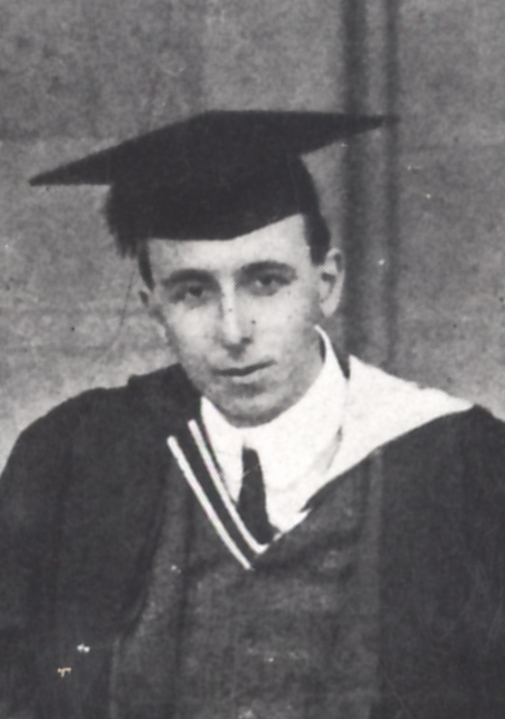
- Priestley in 1911
- Born: 10 April 1883; London, Middlesex, England
- Died: 26 February 1932 (aged 48); Brisbane, Queensland, Australia
- Education: Jesus College, Cambridge
- Scientific career
- Fields: Mathematician

Henry James Priestley (10 April 1883 – 26 February 1932) was the first Professor of Mathematics at the University of Queensland.

== Education ==
Henry James Priestley was born in Crouch Hill, London. He was educated at Mill Hill School and Jesus College, University of Cambridge, where he gained his B.A. with honours first class (second division). He was fifth wrangler in the Mathematical Tripos of 1905. In 1909 he received his M.A. from Cambridge.

== Career ==
After graduating from Cambridge, Priestley lectured in mathematics at the Victoria University of Manchester (now University of Manchester) in 1907. He married Margery Hewitt in 1909 in London. In 1910, The University of Queensland, in Brisbane, Australia advertised extensively, four new professor positions in the newly formed University. After Professor Ernest Rutherford of the University of Manchester declined it, Priestley's application was considered and voted favourably upon. Priestley would become Professor of mathematics and physics. He and his wife arrived in Brisbane in 1911, on the same boat as his colleague Professor John Lundie Michie. However Priestley soon realised he couldn't teach all the necessary subjects alone, and so Thomas Parnell, who was teaching at the University of Melbourne, found his application to lecture in physics successful. By 1919 the senate of the University decided to create separate departments of mathematics and physics. Priestley was offered either chair and chose mathematics. Thomas Parnell was offered the physics chair.

In 1912 Priestley became a member of the London Mathematical Society and subsequently published papers in its proceedings and in other journals, mainly in the areas of applied mathematics and mathematical physics. He believed the University would not succeed unless its academics published extensively to improve its reputation. Priestley had considerable influence on university affairs, and despaired at the state of the buildings and library. He served as Dean of the Faculty of Science (1911–19). He was president of the Board of Faculties (later professorial board) (1922–25) and was a member of many standing committees of the senate and board. He was a keen member of the University Musical Society. He was also a supporter of hockey at the university, his daughter later becoming a member of the women's team. His wife was active in the establishment of the Women's College at the University.

A founder of the Queensland branch of the Mathematical Association of Great Britain, Priestley was its president for many years. He was President of the Royal Society of Queensland in 1923. He spoke at lecture tours throughout Queensland, notably on Einstein's theory of relativity.

Priestley died on 26 February 1932 of a cerebral tumour after a long illness, survived by his wife, three sons and a daughter. His obituary was given in the newspapers by his colleague, Professor John Lundie Michie.

His eldest son Henry Thomas Priestley, was a key advocate for the establishment of Townsville University College (now James Cook University) in 1960.

== Legacy ==
A major building at the University of Queensland bears his name.
