= Reginald Heber Roe =

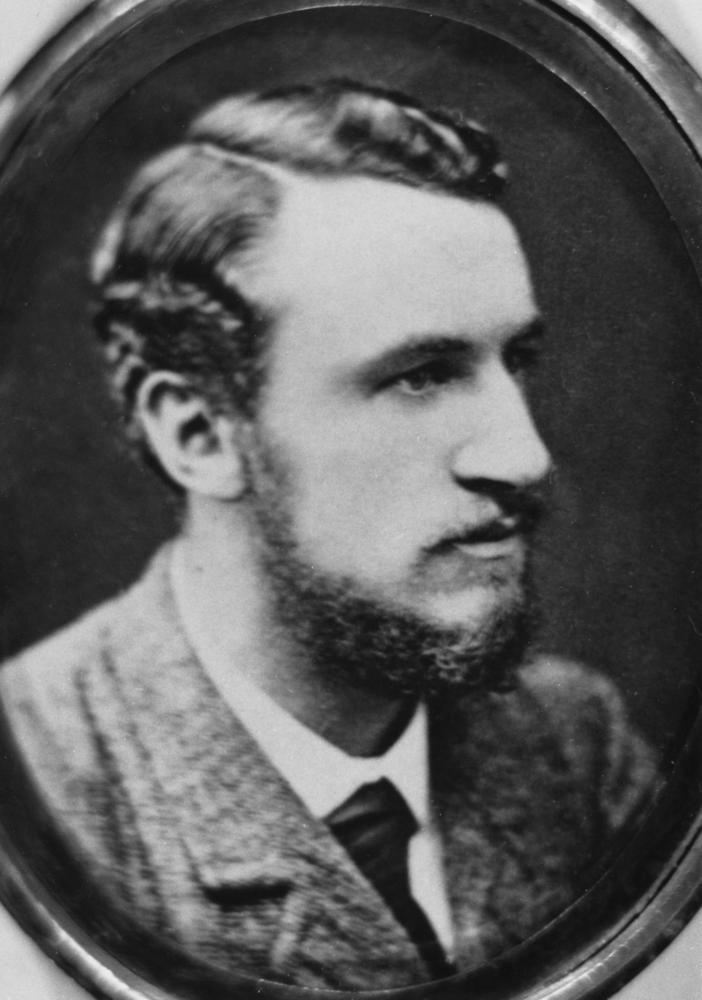
Portrait of Reginald Heber Roe

Reginald Heber Roe (3 August 1850 – 21 September 1926) was a headmaster of Brisbane Grammar School, Queensland, Australia and first vice-chancellor of the University of Queensland.

== Legacy ==
In 2022, the University of Queensland established the R.H. Roe Award "to recognise individuals who have made a unique and lasting contribution through their dedicated service to UQ." The inaugural recipient was emeritus professor Fred D’Agostino.
