= Merewalesi Falemaka =

Fijian economsit and diplomat

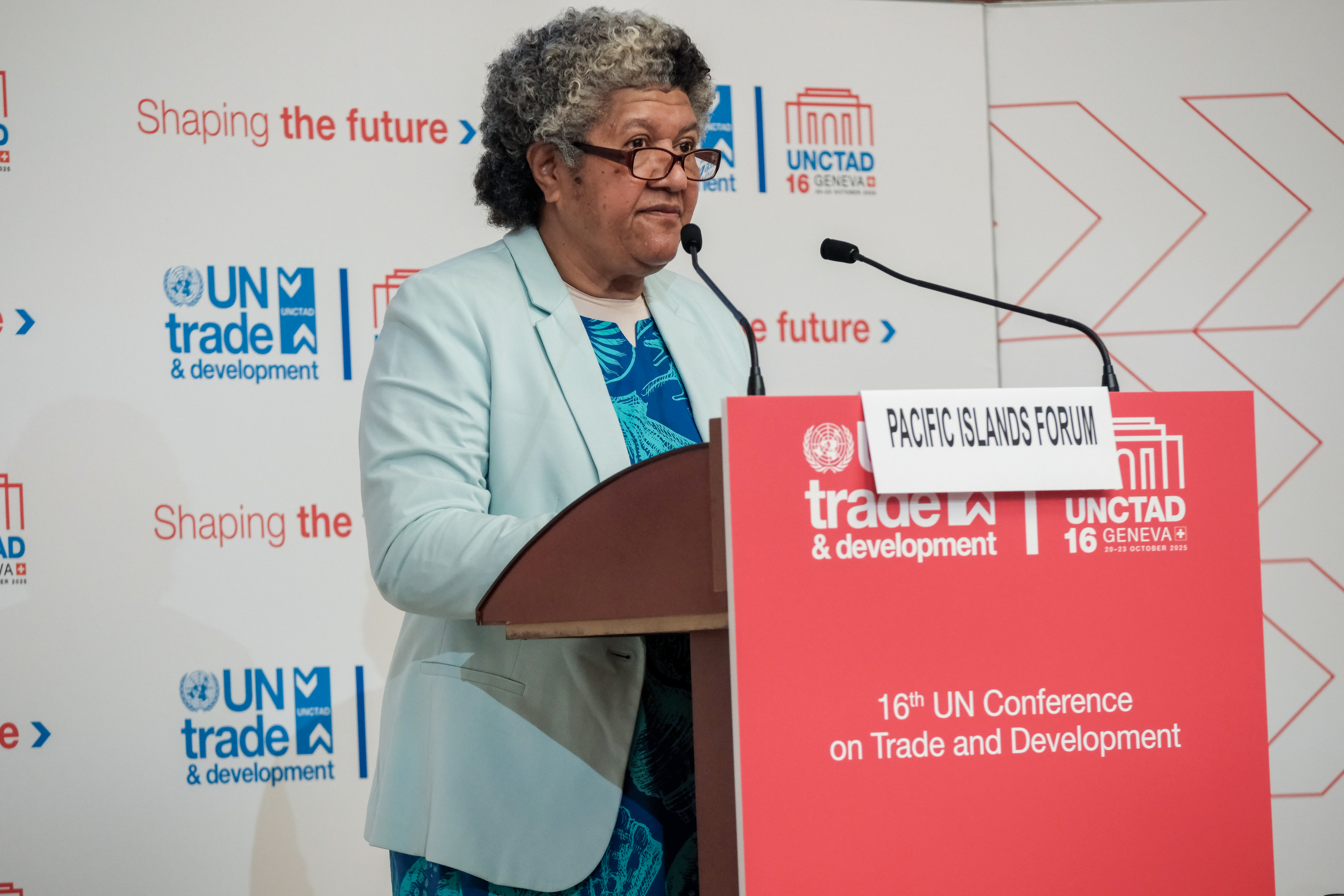
Falemaka in the 16th conference of the UNCTAD, 23 October 2025

Merewalesi Falemaka is a Fijian economist and diplomat. She has been serving as the permanent representative of the Pacific Islands Forum to the World Trade Organization since 2013 and as permanent observer of the Forum to the United Nations in Geneva between 2018 and March 2023, and again since July 2023.

== Education ==
Falemaka graduated with a degree in economics and geography from the University of South Pacific in 1982 and obtained a master's degree in economic studies from the University of Queensland, Australia, in 1996.

== Career ==
Falemaka began working at the Ministry of Commerce, Industry and Trade of Fiji in 1986, where she worked until 1999 and rose to become its chief economist. Between 2000 and 2006, she was a trade policy adviser on World Trade Organization issues at the Pacific Islands Forum Secretariat in Fiji.

She served as a trade adviser to the Pacific States within the Commonwealth during the negotiations for the Economic Partnership Agreement with the European Union at the Secretariat of the Pacific Islands Forum between 2006 and 2007. Subsequently, between 2007 and 2009, she worked as a Trade Consultant for the Pacific States in the same negotiations at that organisation. Later, from 2009 to 2013, she held the post of Director of Trade and Investment at the Secretariat of the Melanesian Spearhead Group in Port Vila, Vanuatu.

in 2013 Falemaka was named as the permanent representative of the Pacific Islands Forum to the World Trade Organization since 2013 and became permanent observer of the Forum to the United Nations in Geneva in 2018, an office she hel until March 2023. She was re-appointed in July 2023.
