= University of Queensland =

Public research university in Brisbane, Australia

The University of Queensland
- Coat of arms
- Motto: Latin: Scientia ac Labore
- Motto in English: "By means of knowledge and hard work"
- Type: Public research university
- Established: 10 December 1909; 116 years ago (Note: Although officially established on 10 December 1909, the official founding date used by the university is 16 April 1910 when the gazette of appointments to the first senate was published. Additionally, classes didn't commence until 14 March 1911 and the current site was purchased in 1926.)
- Accreditation: TEQSA
- Affiliations: Group of Eight (Go8)
- Academic affiliations: U21; APRU; MISA; LSGL; OUA; UA
- Endowment: A$432.5 million (2023)
- Budget: A$2.44 billion (2023)
- Chancellor: Mary O'Kane
- Vice-Chancellor: Deborah Terry
- Faculty: 2,988 (FTE, 2023)
- Administrative staff: 4,516 (FTE, 2023)
- Total staff: 7,504 (FTE, 2023)
- Students: 57,154 (2023)
- Undergraduates: 28,522 (2023)
- Postgraduates: 12,455 coursework (2023); 3,332 research (2023)
- Other students: 378 (2023)
- Location: Sir Fred Schonell Drive, Brisbane, Queensland, 4072, Australia; 27°29′50″S 153°0′47″E
- Campus: Metropolitan and regional with multiple sites
- Colours: Purple
- Sporting affiliations: UniSport; EAEN
- Mascot: Various
- Website: uq.edu.au

The University of Queensland (UQ) is a public research university located primarily in Brisbane, the capital city of the Australian state of Queensland. Established in 1909 by an act of the Queensland Parliament, UQ is one of the six sandstone universities; an informal designation for the oldest university in each state. UQ is also a founding member of edX, the Group of Eight and the international research-intensive Association of Pacific Rim Universities.

The main St Lucia campus occupies much of the riverside inner suburb of St Lucia, southwest of the Brisbane central business district. Other UQ campuses and facilities are located throughout Queensland, the largest of which are the Gatton campus and the Herston campus, notably including the Mayne Medical School. UQ's overseas establishments include UQ North America office in Washington D.C., and the UQ-Ochsner Clinical School in Louisiana, United States.

The university offers associate, bachelor, master, doctoral, and higher doctorate degrees through a college, a graduate school, and six faculties. UQ incorporates over one hundred research institutes and centres offering research programs, such as the Institute for Molecular Bioscience, Boeing Research and Technology Australia Centre, the Australian Institute for Bioengineering and Nanotechnology, and the UQ Dow Centre for Sustainable Engineering Innovation. Recent notable research of the university include pioneering the invention of the HPV vaccine that prevents cervical cancer, developing a COVID-19 vaccine that was in human trials, and the development of high-performance superconducting MRI magnets for portable scanning of human limbs.

UQ counts two Nobel laureates (Peter C. Doherty, a UQ graduate, and John Harsanyi, though neither prize was awarded while they were at UQ), over a hundred Olympians who have won numerous gold medals, and over a hundred Rhodes Scholars among its alumni and former staff. UQ's alumni also include University of California, San Francisco Chancellor Sam Hawgood; the first female Governor-General of Australia, Dame Quentin Bryce; former President of King's College London, Ed Byrne; member of the United Kingdom's Prime Minister's Council for Science and Technology, Max Lu; Oscar, Tony and Primetime Emmy Award winner Geoffrey Rush; triple Grammy Award winner Tim Munro; former CEO and chairman of Dow Chemical, Andrew N. Liveris; and current director of multiple organisations including IBM.

== History ==
=== Foundation of the university ===
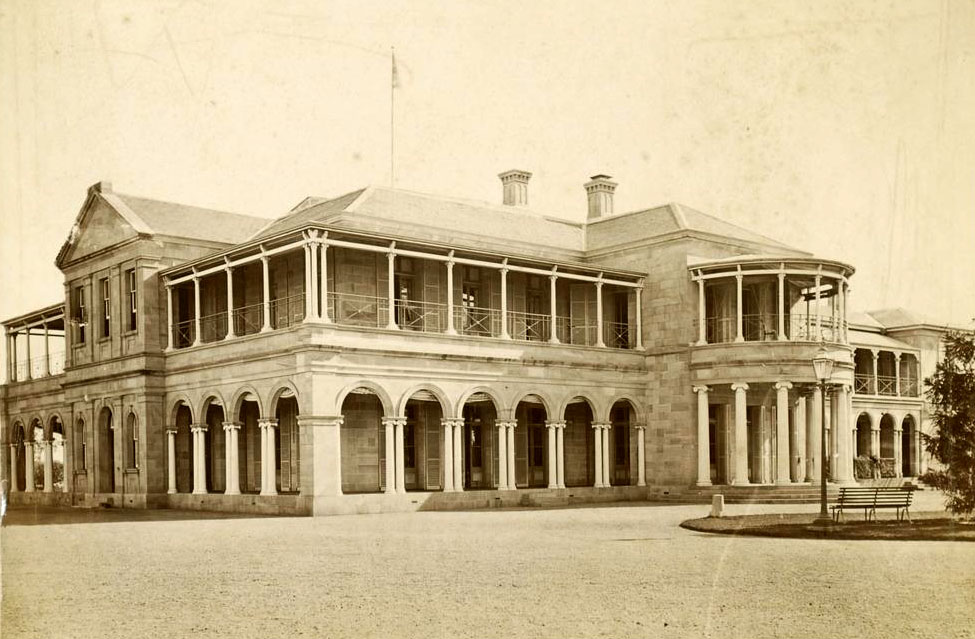
The University of Queensland's former main campus

According to the Queensland Government's Heritage Register's History section:

Proposals for a university in Queensland began in the 1870s. A Royal Commission in 1874, chaired by Sir Charles Lilley, recommended the immediate establishment of a university. Those against a university argued that technical rather than academic education was more important in an economy dominated by primary industry. Those in favour of the university, in the face of this opposition, distanced themselves from Oxford and Cambridge and proposed instead a model derived from the mid-western states of the U.S.A. A second Royal Commission in 1891 recommended the inclusion of five faculties in a new university; Arts, Law, Medicine, Science, and Applied Science. Education generally was given a low priority in Queensland's budgets, and in a colony with a literacy rate of 57% in 1861, primary education was the first concern well ahead of secondary and technical education. The government, despite the findings of the Royal Commissions, was unwilling to commit funds to the establishment of a university.

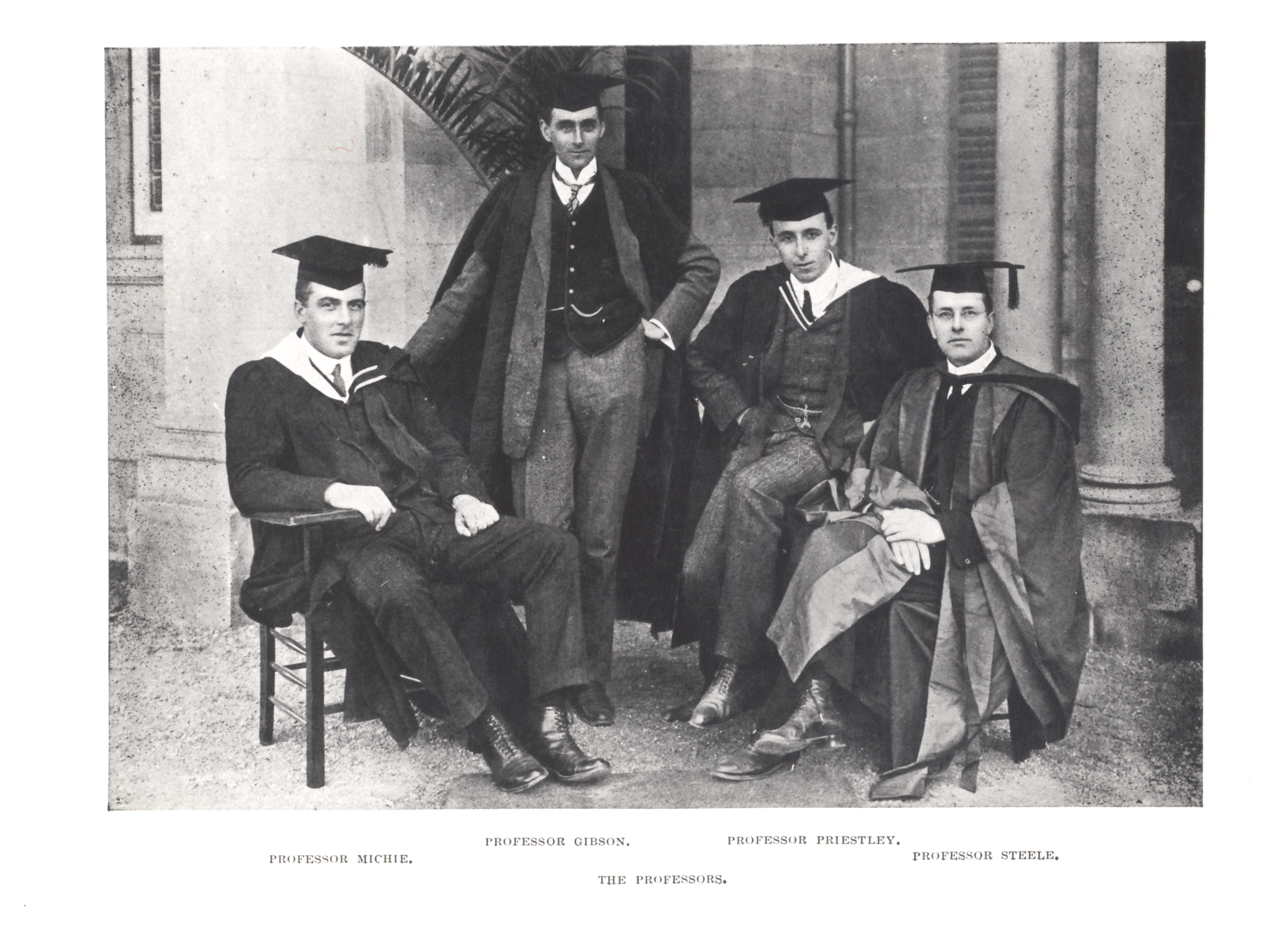
The four founding Professors of the University of Queensland, 1911. From left to right: Professor John Lundie Michie (classics), Professor Alexander James Gibson (engineering), Professor Henry James Priestley (mathematics and physics), Professor Bertram Dillon Steele (chemistry).

In 1893, the Queensland University Extension Movement was begun by a group of private individuals who organised public lecture courses in adult education, hoping to excite wider community support for a university in Queensland. In 1894, 245 students were enrolled in the extension classes and the lectures were described as practical and useful. In 1906 the University Extension Movement staged the University Congress, a forum for interested delegates to promote the idea of a university. Opinion was mobilised, a fund was started and a draft Bill for a Queensland University was prepared. Stress was laid on the practical aspects of university education and its importance for the commerce of Queensland. The proceedings of the Congress were forwarded to Premier [of Queensland] Kidston. In October 1906, sixty acres in Victoria Park were gazetted for university purposes.

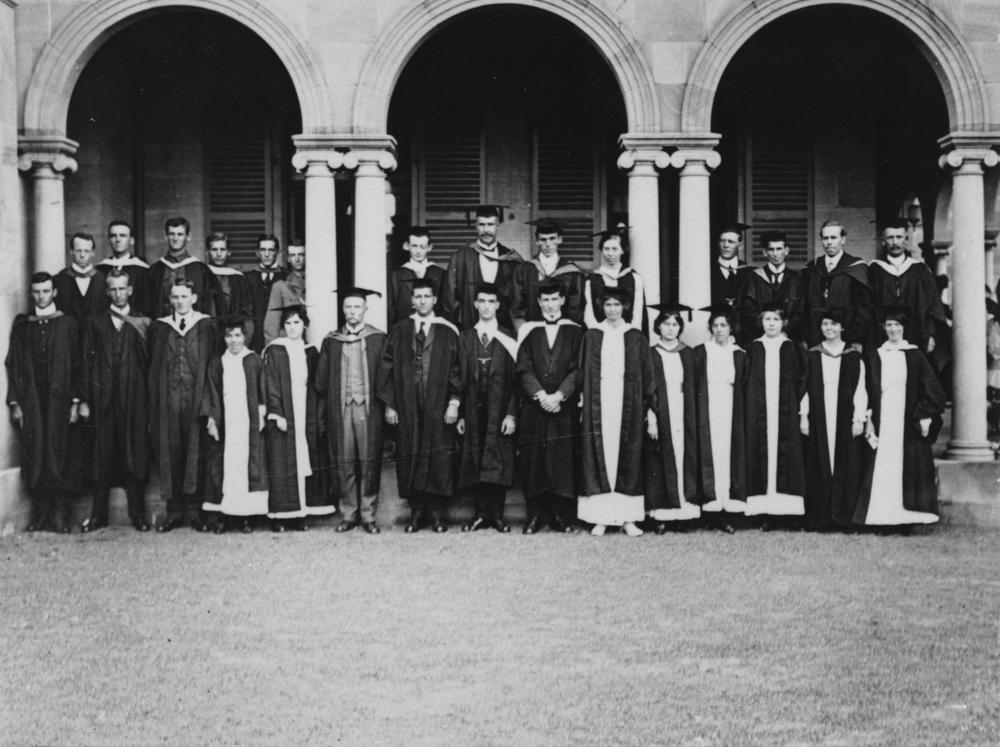
A group of Queensland University students in 1912

The University of Queensland was established by an Act of State Parliament on 10 December 1909 to commemorate the 50th anniversary of Queensland's separation from the colony of New South Wales. The Act allowed for the university to be governed by a senate of 20 men and Sir William MacGregor, the incoming Governor, was appointed the first chancellor with RH Roe as the vice-chancellor. Old Government House ... [then Government House] in George Street was set aside for the university following the departure of the governor to the Bardon residence, Fernberg..., sparking the first debates about the best location for the university.

In 1910 the first teaching faculties were created. These included Engineering, Classics, Mathematics[,] and Chemistry. In December of the same year, the Senate appointed the first four professors; BD Steele in chemistry, JL Michie in classics, H. Priestley in mathematics and A Gibson in engineering. In 1911 the first students enrolled.

The university's first classes in the Government House were held in 1911 with 83 commencing students and Sir William MacGregor is the first chancellor (with RH Roe as vice-chancellor). The University of Queensland began to award degrees to its first group of graduating students in 1914.

=== 1920s to 1990s ===
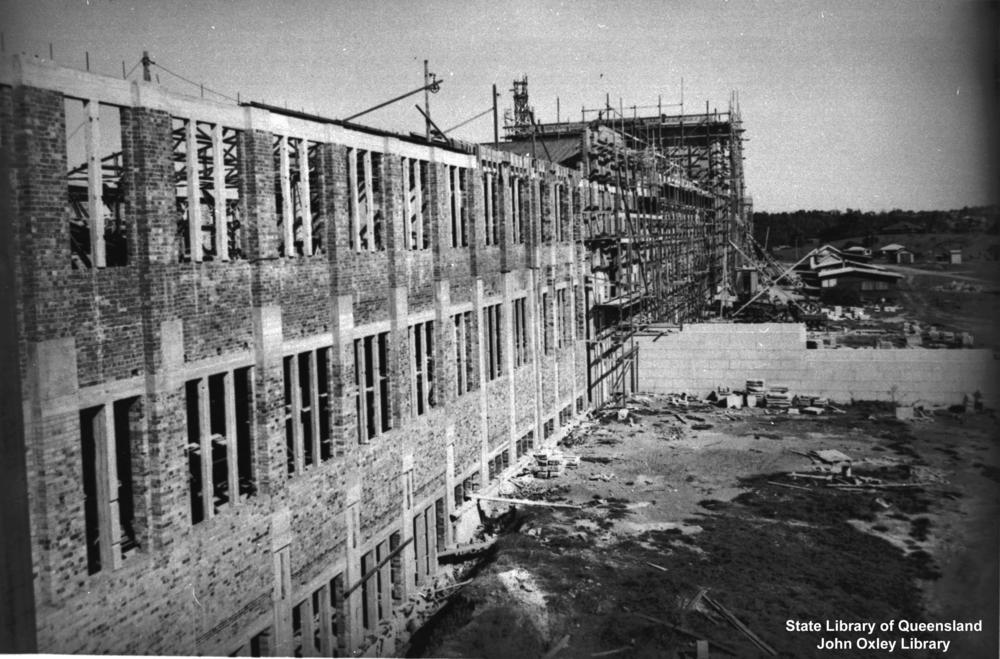
Construction of the Forgan Smith Building began in 1938.

The development of the university was delayed by World War I, but after the first world war the university enrolments for education and research took flight as demand for higher education increased in Australia. Thus, in the early 1920s the growing university had to look for a more spacious campus as its original site in George Street, Brisbane, had limited room for expansion. In 1927, James O'Neil Mayne and his sister, Mary, provided a grant of approximately £50,000 to the Brisbane City Council to acquire 274 acres (111 ha) of land in St Lucia and provided it to the University of Queensland as its permanent home. In the same year, the pitch drop experiment was started by Thomas Parnell. The experiment has been described as the world's oldest and continues to this day. Lack of finance delayed development of the St Lucia campus. Hence, the construction of the university's first building in St Lucia only began in 1938. It was later named the Forgan Smith Building, after the premier of the day and it was completed in 1939. During World War II, the Forgan Smith Building was used as a military base and it served first as advanced headquarters for the Allied Land Forces in the South West Pacific.

Victor and Evelyn Lewis Fountain, in the main lake at the St Lucia campus. This is a 2012 replica, which replaced the 1960s fibreglass original, designed by Kelvin Crump.

The first Doctor of Science was awarded in 1942. The first PhD was awarded in 1952.

=== 1990s to present day ===
In 1990, Australia reorganised its higher education system by abolishing the binary system of universities and colleges of advanced education. Under this transition, the university merged with Queensland Agricultural College, to establish the new UQ Gatton campus. In 1999, UQ Ipswich began operation as one of the completely web-enabled campuses in Australia.

In 2010, The University of Queensland was a recipient of the Queensland Greats Awards.

In May 2013, UQ joined edX, an international consortium of massive open online courses (MOOCs). From May 2014, the initial four UQx courses cover hypersonics, tropical coastal ecosystems, biomedical imaging and the science of everyday thinking.

== Campuses and buildings ==
Queensland campuses and locations of The University of Queensland

The University of Queensland maintains a number of campuses and facilities throughout Queensland. UQ has its main campus in the suburb of St Lucia in Brisbane, bordered by a meander in the Brisbane River to the north, east, and south. UQ's main campus has been recognised for its beauty by a number of sources. Its other campuses include Gatton, Herston and Dutton Park (formerly the Pharmacy Australia Centre of Excellence).

=== St Lucia campus ===
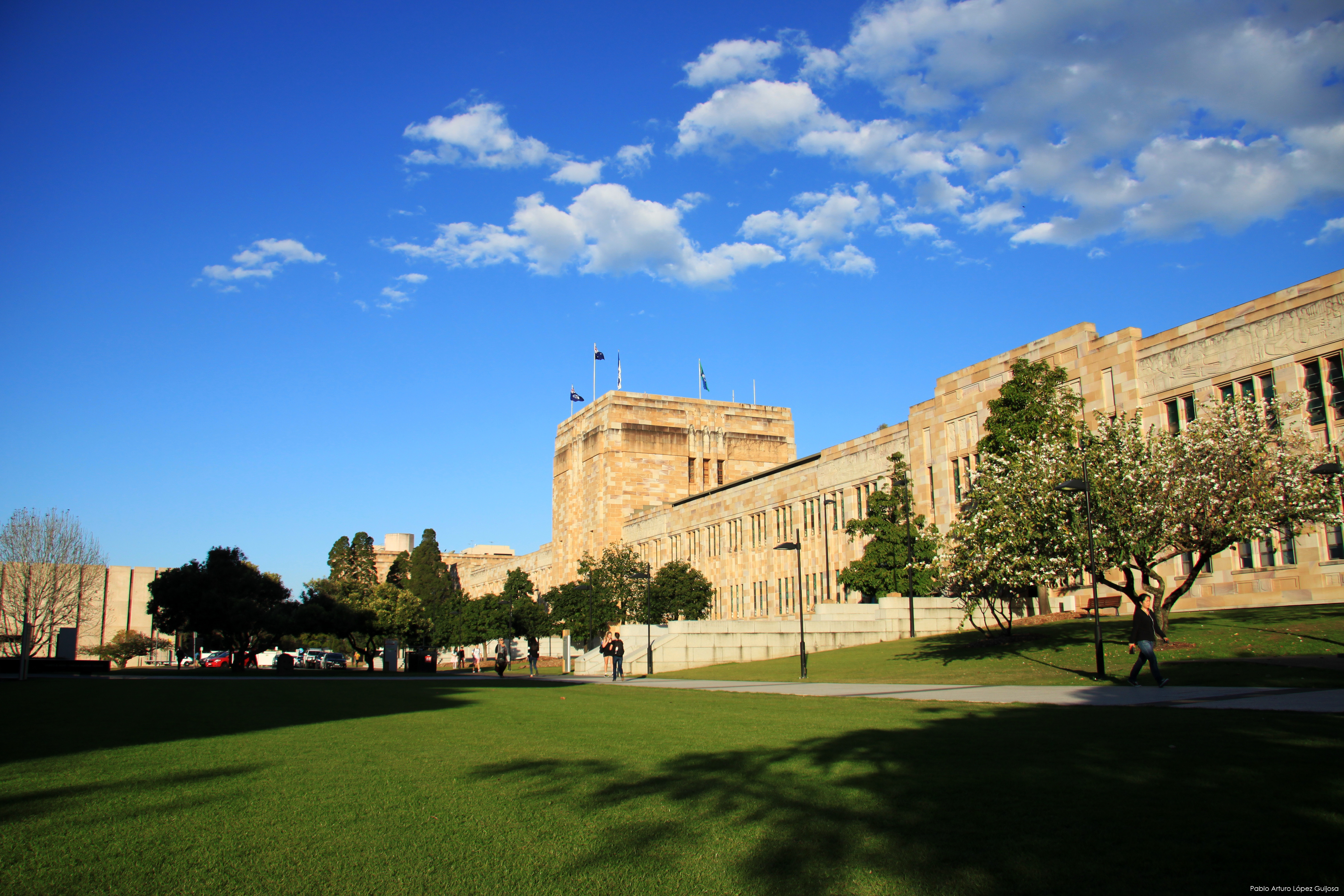
UQ St Lucia

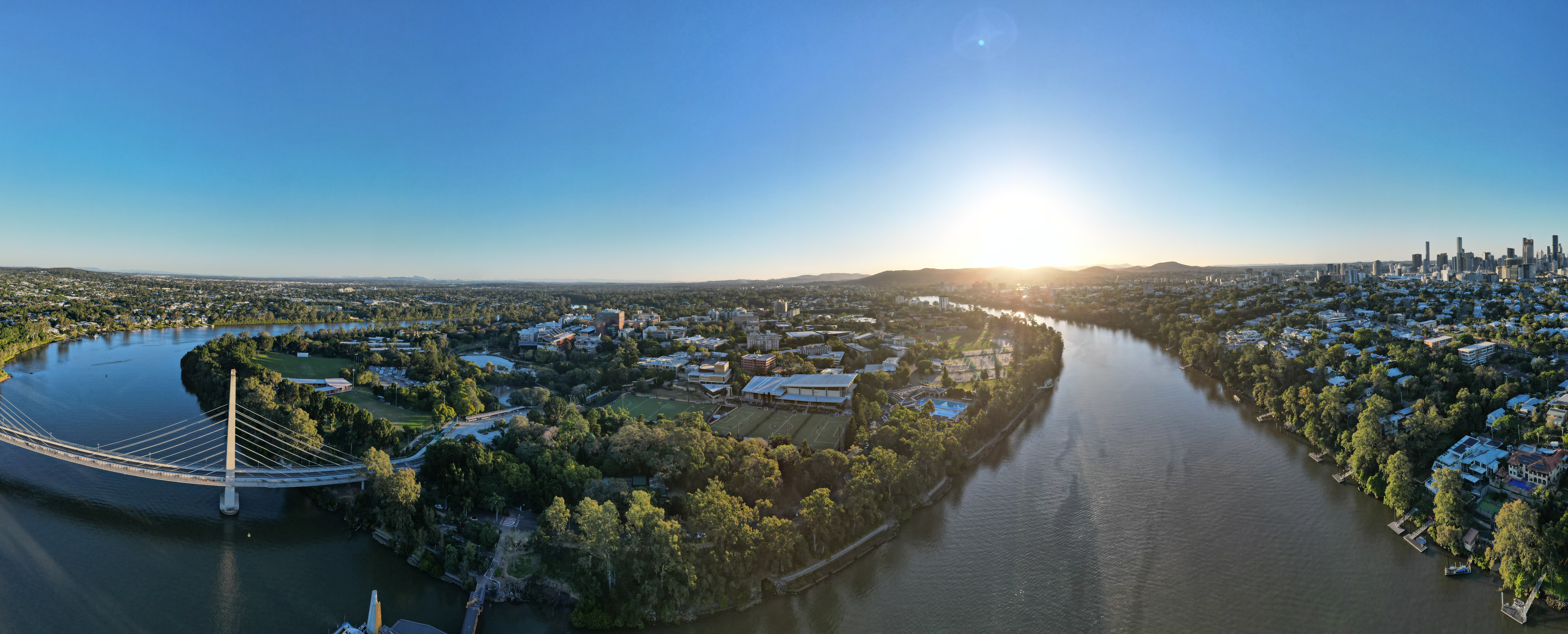
Sunset over the University of Queensland's St Lucia Campus

In 1927, the land on which the St Lucia campus is built was resumed by the Brisbane City Council using money donated by James O'Neil Mayne and his sister Mary Emelia Mayne to replace the less spacious city campus. The city campus is now home to the Gardens Point campus of the Queensland University of Technology. Construction of the new university at St Lucia began in 1937.

==== Great Court ====
At its centre is the heritage-listed Great Court – a 2.5 hectares (6.2 acres) open area surrounded by Helidon sandstone buildings with grotesques of great academics and historic scenes, floral and faunal motifs and crests of universities and colleges from around the world. This central semi-circular quadrangle features a connected arcade so students could reach any section under cover. The Great Court was added to the Queensland Heritage Register in 2002.

==== Museums ====
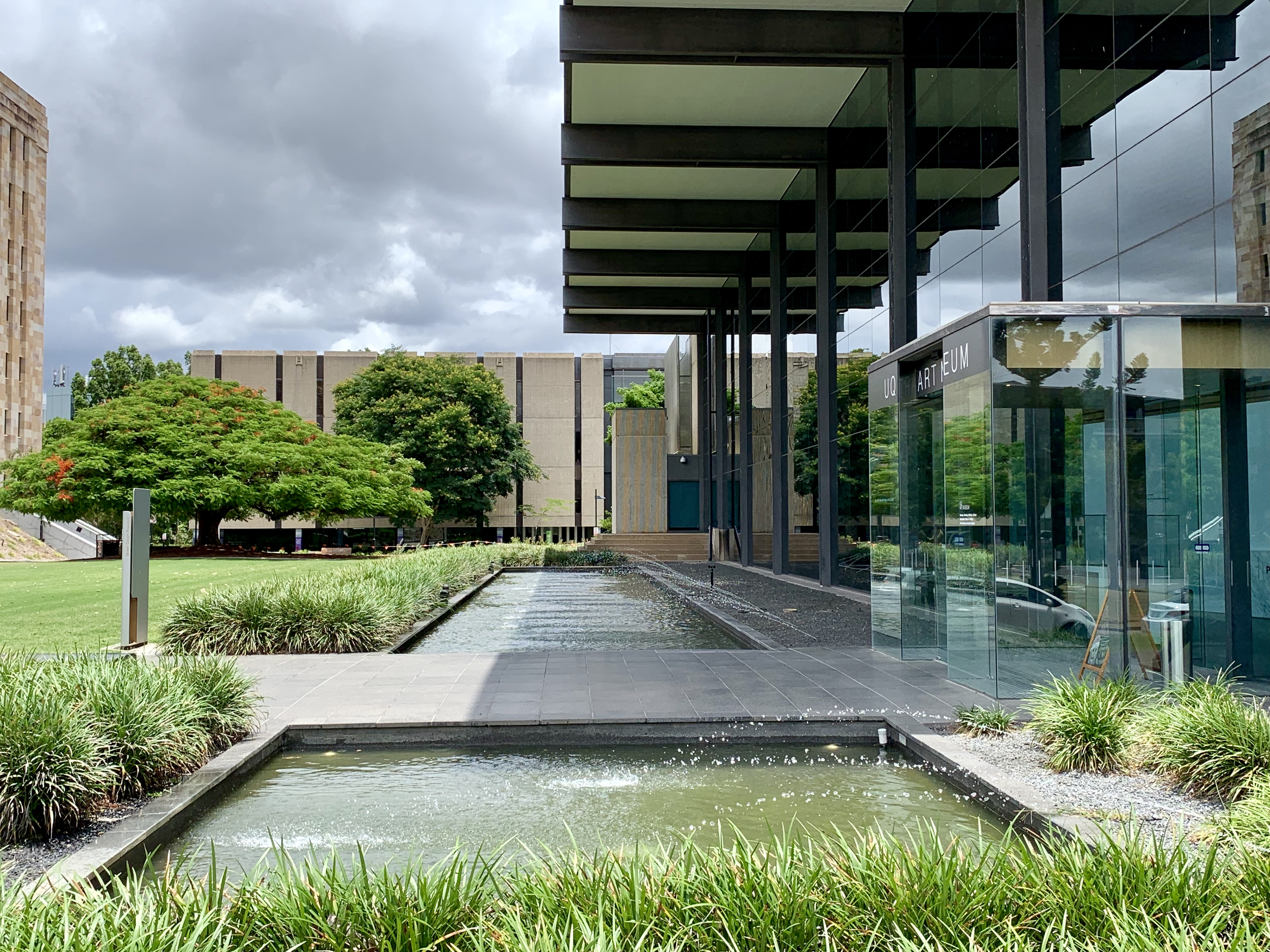
UQ Art Museum – James and Mary Emelia Mayne Centre

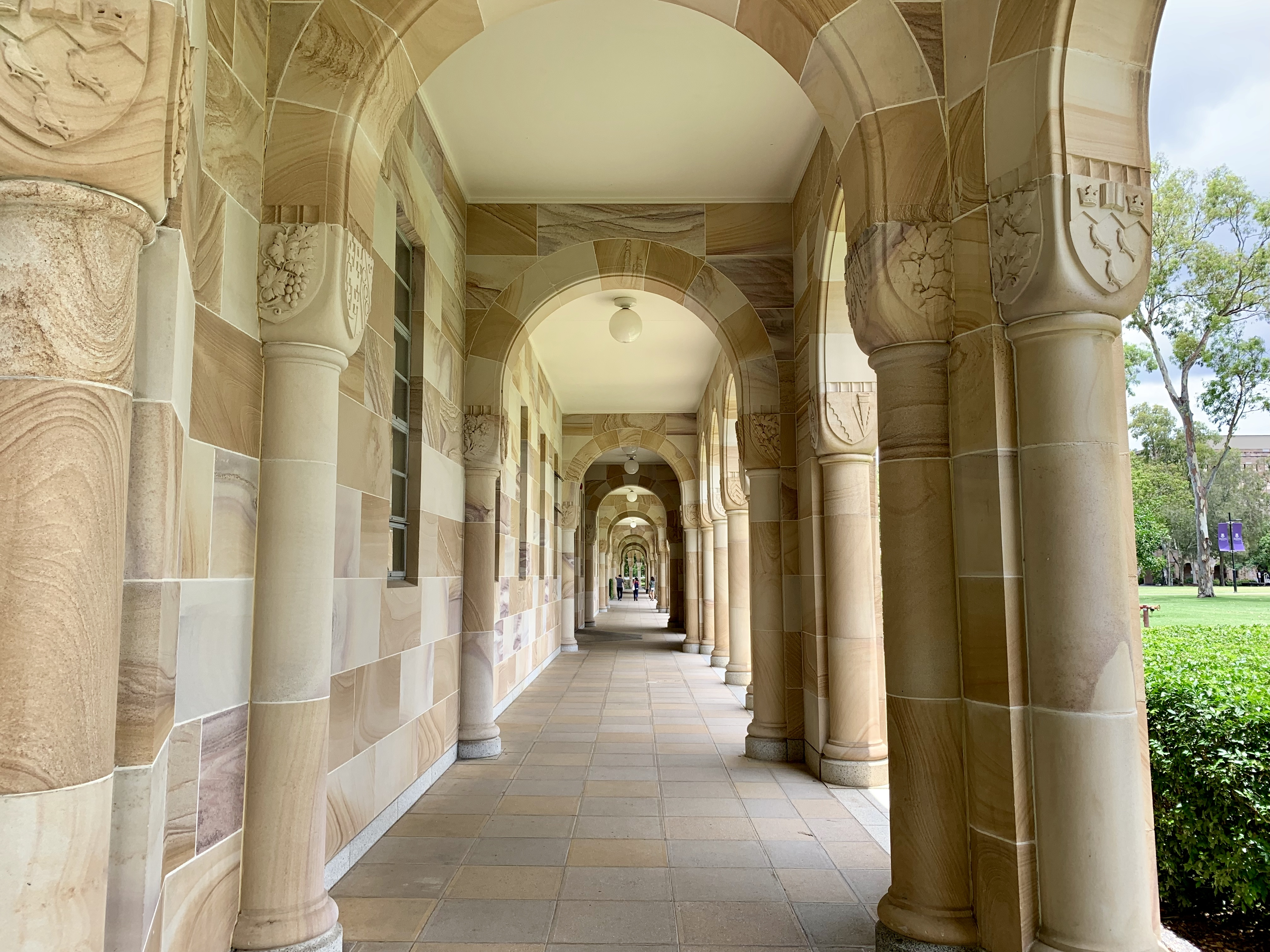
UQ St Lucia

The University of Queensland Art Museum is located in the James and Mary Emelia Mayne Centre on the St Lucia campus. The Art Museum was established in the Forgan Smith Tower in 1976 to house the artworks collected by The University of Queensland since the 1940s, relocating to its present site in 2004. Today, with more than 4,400 artworks, the university's Art Collection is Queensland's second largest public art collection.

The university also houses the R.D. Milns Antiquities Museum in the Michie building (bldg 9, level 2) which contains Queensland's only publicly accessible collection of antiquities from ancient Rome, Greece, Egypt and the Near East. The museum supports research and teaching at the university. The UQ Anthropology Museum (also in the Michie Building on level 1) contains a significant collection of ethnographic material. It is also open to the public.

=== Gatton campus ===
The UQ Gatton Campus covers 1068 ha at Lawes, near the town of Gatton, Queensland, about 90 kilometres (56 mi) west of Brisbane on the Warrego Highway. The campus was opened in 1897 next to the site of the Queensland Agricultural College which was then amalgamated with UQ in 1990. UQ Gatton is the core campus for research, learning and teaching activities and facilities in agriculture, animals, veterinary science and the environment.

In 2008 the Centre for Advanced Animal Science (CAAS) was opened at the Gatton campus – a collaborative venture between UQ and the Queensland Government.

=== Herston campus ===
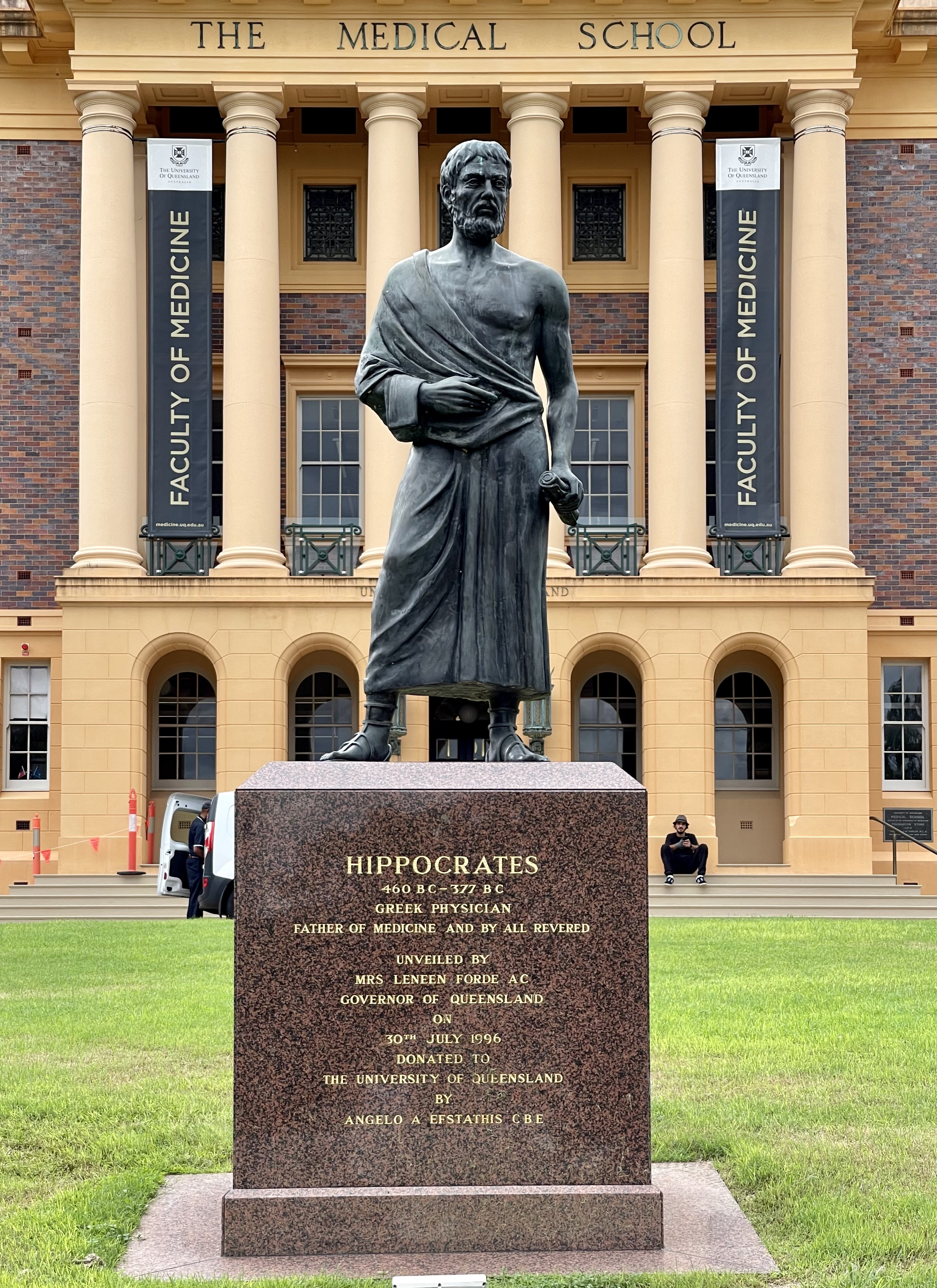
UQ Mayne Medical School, Herston campus

UQ Mayne Medical School and the Queensland Institute of Medical Research is the core campus for clinical health teaching and research. The campus is situated in Herston and operates within Queensland Health system of the Royal Brisbane Hospital, Royal Children's Hospital, Royal Women's Hospital and the Queensland Institute of Medical Research.

It is home to the Faculty of Medicine, the School of Public Health, the Herston Health Sciences Library, the Centre for Clinical Research and clinical research and learning activities of the School of Nursing and Midwifery. The Herston campus also houses other key facilities such as the Oral Health Centre and the purpose-built Herston Imaging Research Facility. The medical school building was added to the Queensland Heritage Register in 1999.

The Marks-Hirschfeld Museum of Medical History is in the Mayne Medical School at the Herston campus. Operated by volunteers and supported by The University of Queensland Alumni, it has a collection of over 7,000 items of medical memorabilia, medical and surgical instruments. The focus is on the study of medical history in Queensland, but the collection includes items with broader significance to Australia and internationally.

Overseas clinical schools

- Louisiana, United States – the UQ-Ochsner Clinical School operates at Ochsner Medical Center, New Orleans and Baton Rouge, allowing medical school students from the UQ-Ochsner program to receive two years of overseas clinical experience, contributing towards their UQ Doctor of Medicine (MD) degree.

=== Dutton Park campus ===
UQ's Dutton Park campus was officially announced by Professor Deborah Terry AC in 2023, rebranding the site of the pre-existing Pharmacy Australia Centre of Excellence [PACE]. The campus contains the Susan Tett Building (formerly the PACE building), home to the School of Pharmacy and Pharmaceutical Sciences, the Queensland Alliance for Environmental Health Sciences, Dutton Park Health Sciences Library (UQ Library), and the Cornwall Street Medical Center (UQ Health Care).

The campus is located in Woolloongabba, adjoining the PA Hospital and the Translational Research Institute, within the Boggo Road Innovation Junction.

=== Former Ipswich campus ===
In 2014, UQ sold the Ipswich Campus to the University of Southern Queensland, believing that this regional teaching campus would be better used by USQ.

The campus was made up of nearly 20 buildings and more than 5001 students on nearly 25 hectares (62 acres). Courses offered included: arts, business, medicine and social sciences as well as Interaction design. It is located near central Ipswich, Queensland, just south of the CBD. Nearby landmarks include Limestone Park, Workshops Rail Museum and RAAF Base Amberley.

The site dates back to 1878 with the opening of the Ipswich branch of the Woogaroo Lunatic Asylum. Operations continued until 1910 when it became the Ipswich Hospital for the Insane. In 1938 it was renamed the Ipswich Mental Hospital and in 1964 it was renamed again as the Ipswich Special Hospital. It was finally named the Challinor Centre in 1968 in honour of Henry Challinor, the ship's surgeon on the Fortitude. From 1968 to 1997 the Challinor Centre served as an institution for people with intellectual disabilities. In late 1997 the Challinor Centre began its first stage of transformation as the new UQ Ipswich campus.

=== Satellite teaching and research centres ===
UQ has other research and education facilities not directly attached to its four campuses. These locations are primarily for research, which cannot be undertaken in the campus locales but also represent buildings which established pre-eminence in education before the creation of the current campuses.

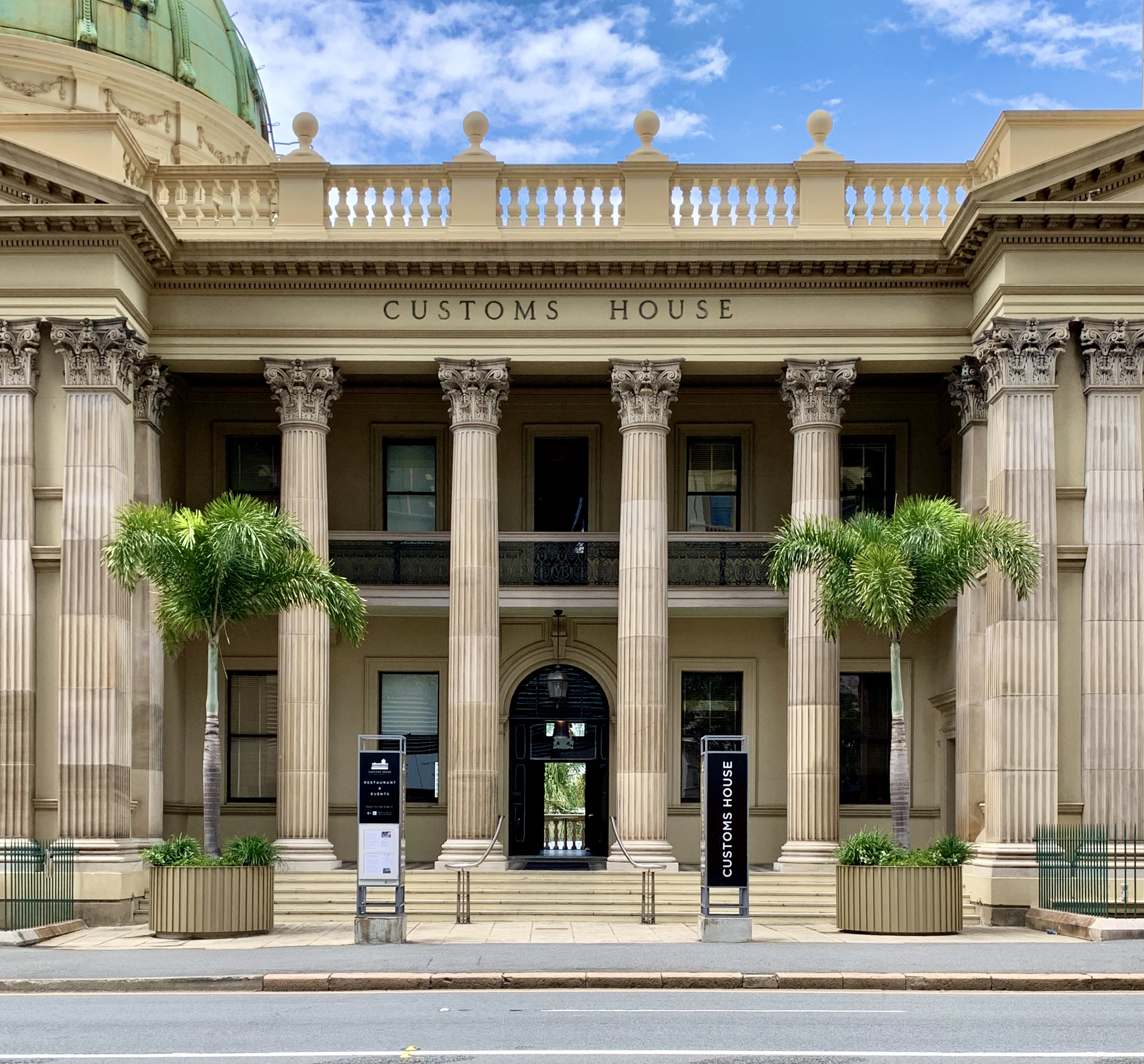
Customs House

Queen Street

Queen Street, Brisbane is the location of the Customs House and the UQ Business School Downtown Venue. Customs House is one of Brisbane's heritage icons and is located on the river along Queen Street in the Brisbane central business district. It is leased to and operated by the University of Queensland as a cultural, educational and heritage facility. The UQ Business School Downtown is an inner-city corporate education, meeting and dining venue and facility which is on Level 19 of Central Plaza One in the Brisbane central business district.

Indooroopilly

Indooroopilly is the site of the Julius Kruttschnitt Mineral Research Centre and the Queensland University Regiment Logistics Company. The Julius Kruttschnitt Mineral Research Centre (JKMRC) of The University of Queensland Sustainable Minerals Institute is at a former silver and lead mine at Finney's Hill in Indooroopilly. Acquired in 1951 by the School of Mining Engineering under the leadership of Frank T. M. White, Foundation Professor (appointed 1950), this mine (formerly Finney's Hill United Silver Mines Limited) then became known as the Queensland University Experimental Mine. It promptly became an integral part of the teaching and research capacity of the School, which in 1952 expanded to become the Department of Mining and Metallurgical Engineering.

JKMRC, incorporating the Experimental Mine, was officially established as a University Centre in 1970, with a goal to develop practical technical solutions for large-scale mining and minerals industry challenges. It is named after Julius Kruttschnitt, the chairman of Mount Isa Mines and a board member of the university's Faculty of Engineering.

The Queensland University Regiment Logistics Company is housed in the Witton Barracks, Indooroopilly.

==== Other locations ====
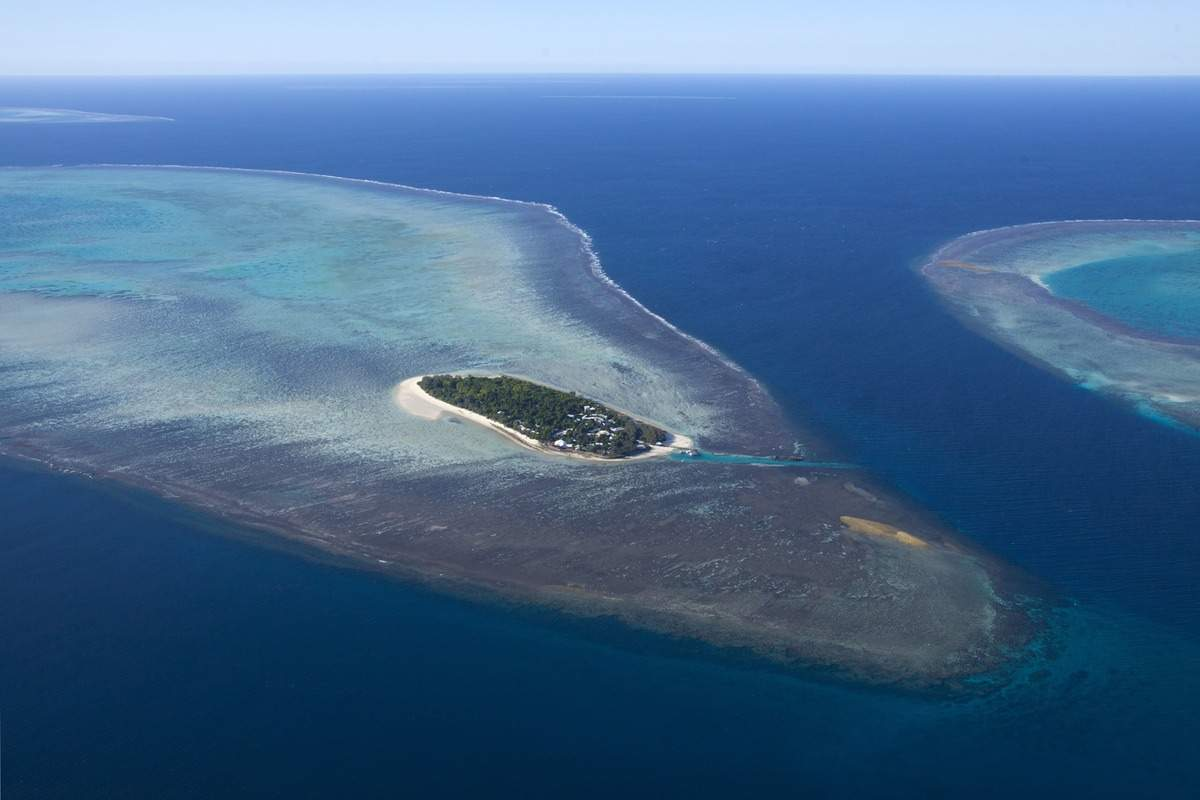
UQ has a research station at Heron Island.

- Pinjarra Hills – the Pinjarra Hills Research Station, the Veterinary Science Farm and the Pinjarra Aquatic Research Station are located in Pinjarra Hills, Brisbane. The Aquatic Research Station investigates aquaculture and inland ecology.
- Heron Island – the Heron Island Research Station is situated on Heron Island, 72 kilometres (45 mi) north-east of Gladstone. Its primary use is for coral reef ecology research and teaching and is an integral component of the Great Barrier Reef Ocean Observations System and the national Integrated Marine Observing System. It consists of more than 30 buildings on a two hectare lease.
- Moreton Bay – the Moreton Bay Research Station and Study Centre is in Dunwich on North Stradbroke Island and researches the ecosystems.
- Mt Nebo – The University of Queensland operates an International Seismograph Station on Mt Nebo.
- Charters Towers – The University of Queensland operates an International Seismograph Station at Charters Towers.
- Dayboro – the Dayboro Veterinary Surgery was bought by the university in 1987 as a teaching clinic for fifth year veterinary students in their dairy cattle medicine rotation. Later, separate brick accommodation was built for student accommodation. Research projects into practical aspects of dairy production are frequently carried out by clinic staff. There is a full range of veterinary services and pet care for dogs, cats, horses, cows, alpacas, goats, and all manner of other small and large animals.

== Governance and structure ==
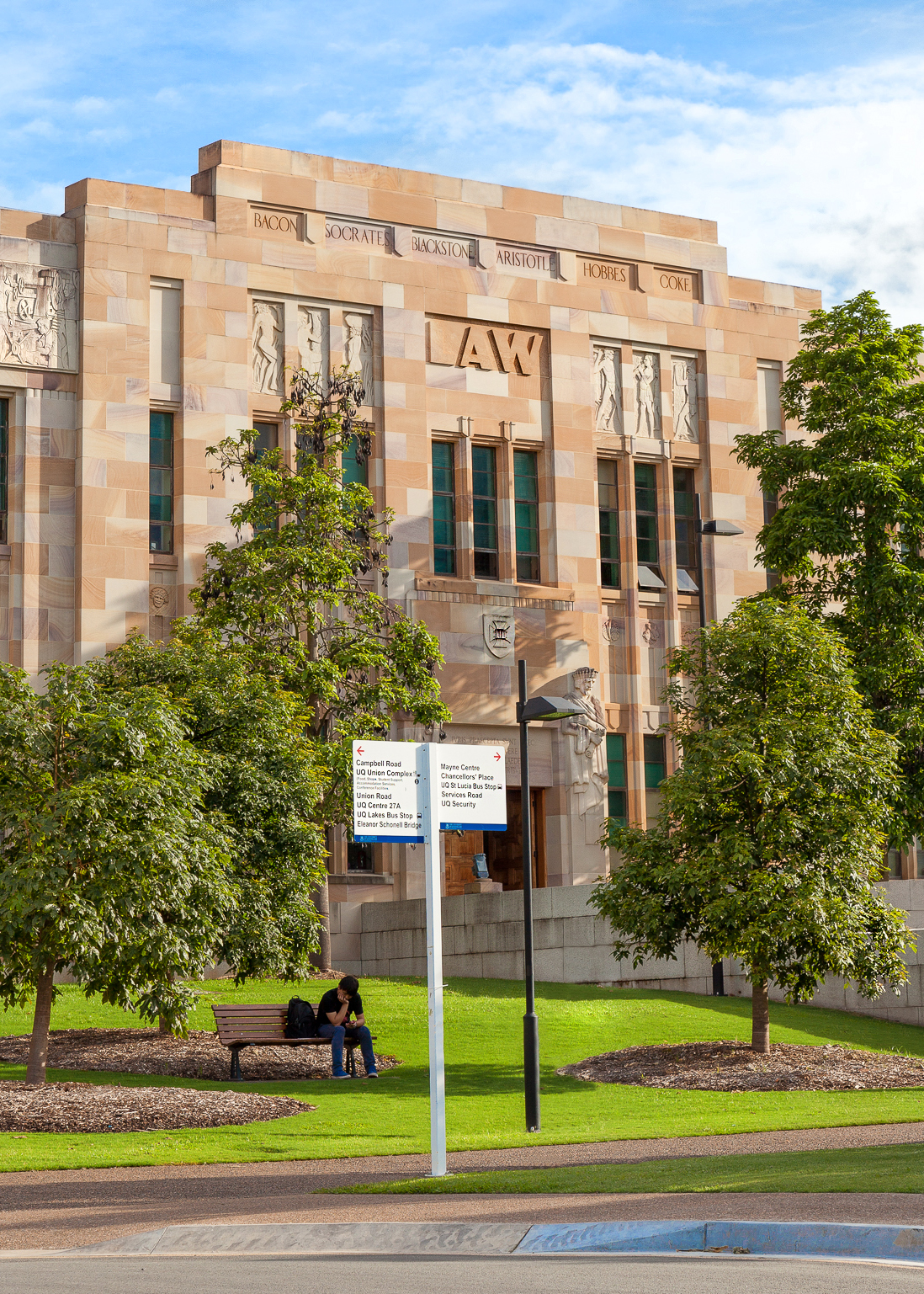
TC Beirne School of Law

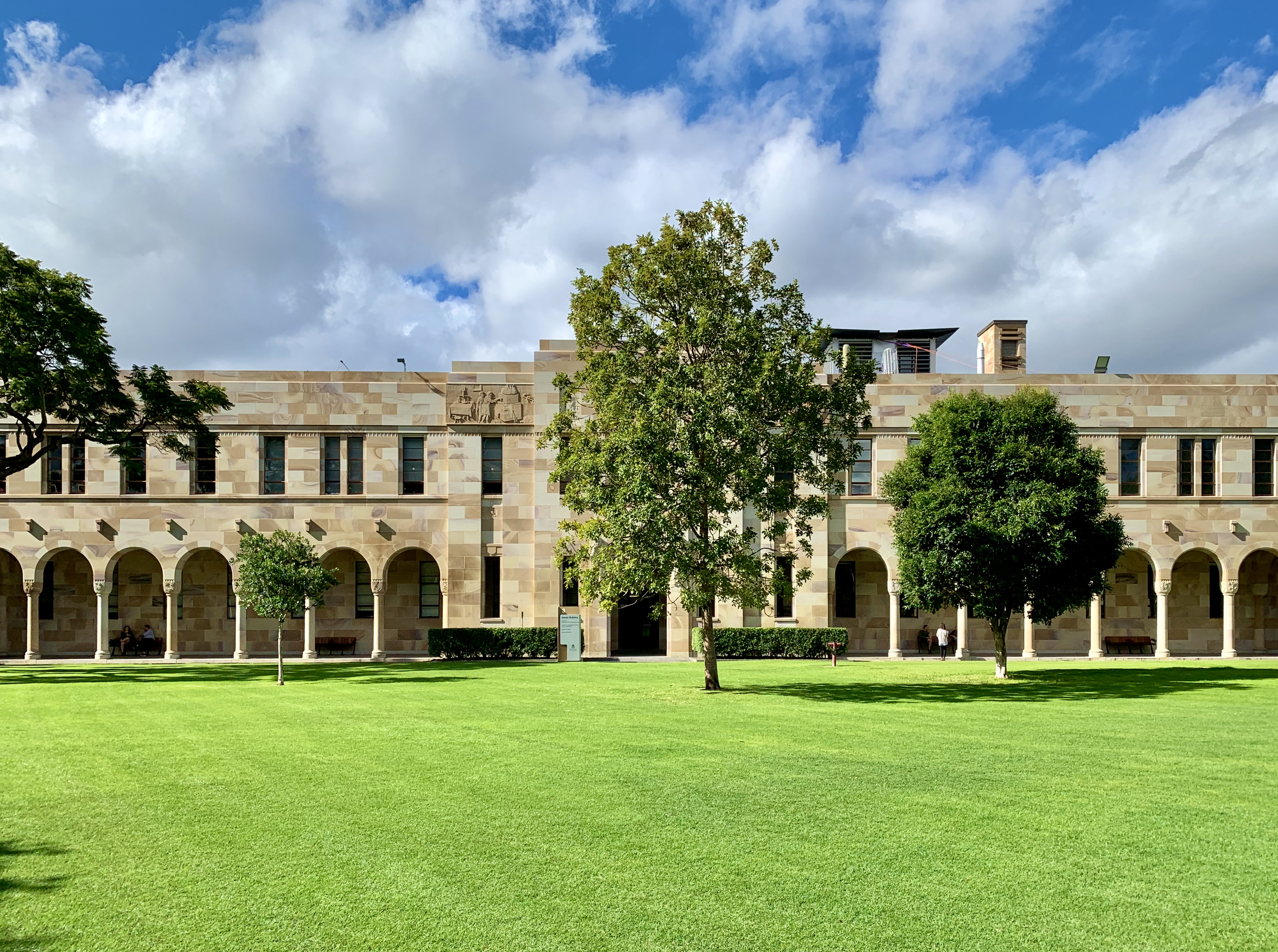
Steele Building, St Lucia campus

The University of Queensland is organised into a number of divisions for academic, administrative and logistical purposes.

=== University Senate ===
The senate is the governing body of The University of Queensland and consists of 22 members from the university and community. The senate is led by the chancellor and deputy chancellor, elected by the senate. The University of Queensland Act 1998 grants the senate wide powers to appoint staff, manage and control university affairs and property and manage and control finances to promote the university's interests.

- Vice-Chancellor and President
- Provost
- Deputy Vice-Chancellor (Academic)
- Deputy Vice-Chancellor (External Engagement)
- Deputy Vice-Chancellor (Research)
- Pro-Vice-Chancellor
- Pro-Vice-Chancellor (Advancement)
- Pro-Vice-Chancellor (Indigenous Engagement)
- Pro-Vice-Chancellor (Research)
- Pro-Vice-Chancellor (Research Infrastructure)
- Pro-Vice-Chancellor (Research Training)
- Pro-Vice-Chancellor (Teaching and Learning)
- Chief Operating Officer
- President of the Academic Board

The academic board is the university's senior academic advisory body. It formulates policy on academic matters including new programs, teaching, learning and assessment, research, promotions, student academic matters, prizes and scholarships. An academic board member is elected annually as its president. The president is assisted by a half-time deputy president.

=== Faculties and departments ===
The university has five faculties to support both research and teaching activities.

Faculty of Business, Economics and Law

- School of Business
- School of Economics
- School of Law

Faculty of Engineering, Architecture and Information Technology

- School of Architecture, Design and Planning
- School of Chemical Engineering
- School of Civil Engineering
- School of Electrical Engineering and Computer Science
- School of Mechanical and Mining Engineering

Faculty of Health, Medicine and Behavioural Sciences

- School of Biomedical Sciences
- School of Dentistry
- School of Health and Rehabilitation Sciences
- School of Human Movement and Nutrition Sciences
- Medical School
- School of Nursing, Midwifery and Social Work
- School of Pharmacy and Pharmaceutical Sciences
- School of Psychology
- School of Public Health

Faculty of Humanities and Social Sciences

- School of Communication and Arts
- School of Education
- School of Historical and Philosophical Inquiry
- School of Languages and Cultures
- School of Music
- School of Political Science and International Studies
- School of Social Science

Faculty of Science

- School of Agriculture and Food Sciences
- School of Chemistry and Molecular Biosciences
- School of the Environment
- School of Mathematics and Physics
- School of Veterinary Science

UQ has a semester-based modular system for conducting academic courses. The Australian higher education model features a combination of the British system, such as small group teaching (tutorials) and the American system (course credits).

=== Academic affiliations ===
UQ is a partner of McDonnell International Scholars Academy - an international network of research universities and scholars comprising 28 university partners, including Boğaziçi University, Fudan University, Hong Kong University of Science and Technology, Indian Institute of Science, Indian Institute of Technology Bombay, Indian Institute of Technology Delhi, Keio University, Korea University, Makerere University, Middle East Technical University, National Taiwan University, National University of Singapore, National Yang Ming Chiao Tung University, Peking University, Reichman University, Seoul National University, State University of Campinas, Tata Institute of Social Sciences, Technion – Israel Institute of Technology, Tecnológico de Monterrey, The Chinese University of Hong Kong, Tsinghua University, University of Chile, University of Ghana, University of Hong Kong, University of Indonesia, Gadjah Mada University, University of Tokyo, Utrecht University and Yonsei University.

== Academic profile ==
=== Research and publications ===
UQ has a strong research focus in science, medicine and technology. The university's research advancement includes pioneering the development of the cervical cancer vaccines, Gardasil and Cervarix, by UQ Professor Ian Frazer. In 2009, the Australian Cancer Research Foundation reported that UQ had taken the lead in numerous areas of cancer research.

In the Commonwealth Government's Excellence in Research for Australia 2012 National Report, UQ's research is rated above world standard in more broad fields than at any other Australian university (in 22 broad fields), and more UQ researchers are working in research fields that ERA has assessed as above world standard than at any other Australian university. UQ research in biomedical and clinical health sciences, technology, engineering, biological sciences, chemical sciences, environmental sciences, and physical sciences was ranked above world standard (rating 5).

In 2015, UQ is ranked by Nature Index as the research institution with the highest volume of research output in both interdisciplinary journals Nature and Science within the southern hemisphere, with approximately twofold more output than the global average.

In 2020 Clarivate named 34 UQ professors to its list of Highly Cited Researchers.

Aside from disciplinary-focused teaching and research within the academic faculties, the university maintains a number of interdisciplinary research institutes and centres at the national, state and university levels. For example, the Asia-Pacific Centre for the Responsibility to Protect, the University of Queensland Seismology Station, Heron Island Research Station and the Institute of Modern Languages.

The University of Queensland plays a key role in Brisbane Diamantina Health Partners, Queensland's first academic health science system. This partnership currently comprises Children's Health Queensland, Mater Health Services, Metro North Hospital and Health Service, Metro South Health, QIMR Berghofer Medical Research Institute, Queensland University of Technology, and the Translational Research Institute.

=== Research divisions ===
With the support from the Queensland Government, the Australian Government and major donor The Atlantic Philanthropies, The University of Queensland dedicates basic, translational and applied research via the following research-focused institutes:

- Institute for Molecular Bioscience – within the Queensland Bioscience Precinct which houses scientists from the Commonwealth Scientific and Industrial Research Organisation and the Community for Open Antimicrobial Drug Discovery
- Translational Research Institute, which houses The University of Queensland's Diamantina Institute, School of Medicine and the Mater Medical Research Institute
- Australian Institute for Bioengineering and Nanotechnology
- Institute for Social Science Research
- Sustainable Minerals Institute
- Global Change Institute
- Queensland Alliance for Environmental Health Science
- Queensland Alliance for Agriculture and Food Innovation
- Queensland Brain Institute
- Centre for Advanced Imaging
- Boeing Research and Technology Australia Centre
- UQ Dow Centre

=== Commercialisation and entrepreneurship ===
UniQuest is the main commercialisation company of The University of Queensland and specialises in global technology transfer and facilitates access for all business. UniQuest has created over 100 startups from its intellectual property portfolio, and since 2000 UniQuest and its start-ups have raised more than $700 million to take university technologies to market. UQ technologies licensed by UniQuest include UQ's cervical cancer vaccine technology, image correction technology in magnetic resonance imaging machines, and the Triple P Positive Parenting Program.

=== Libraries and databases ===
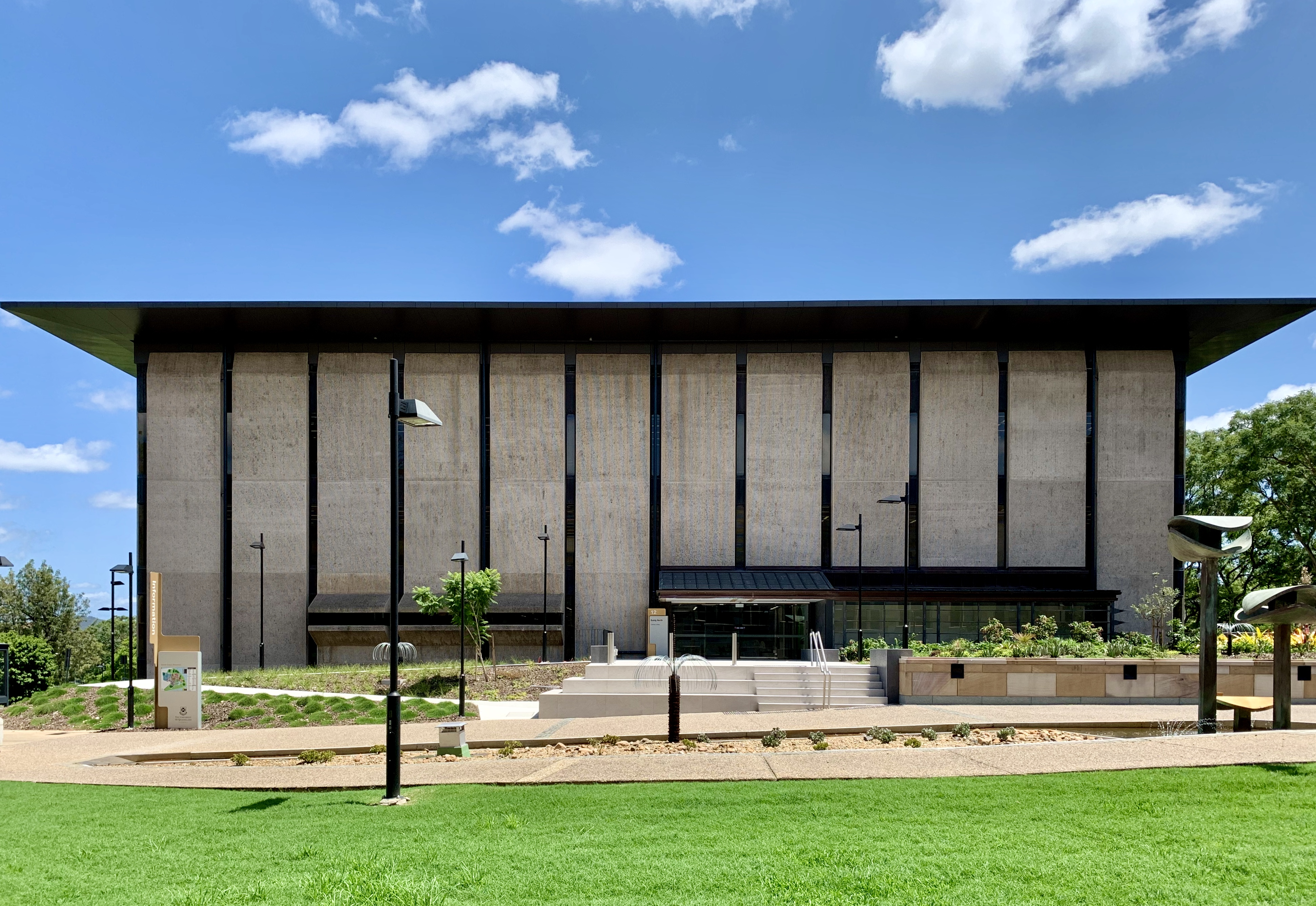
University of Queensland Library

The University of Queensland Library was founded in 1910. It developed from a small provincial university library into a major research library. It consists of 11 branches.

- Architecture and Music Library (ARMUS)
- Biological Sciences Library
- Central Library
- Dorothy Hill Engineering and Sciences Library (DHESL)
- Duhig Tower
- Fryer Library
- Gatton Library (J.K. Murray Library)
- Herston Health Sciences Library
- Dutton Park Health Sciences Library (formerly 'Pharmacy Australia Centre of Excellence Health Sciences Library')
- Rural Clinical School Library (RCS)
- Walter Harrison Law Library

=== Journals and publications ===
==== Publishing house ====
University of Queensland Press publishes academic works, as well as, non-fiction works and has launched the careers of noted authors.

==== Academic journals ====
The university publishes several academic journals through its various schools and faculties and in association with publishers:

- Australian Journal of Indigenous Education
- Australian Journal of Politics and History
- Crossroads: an Interdisciplinary Journal for the Study of History, Philosophy, Religion and Classics
- Hecate Journal
- LAWASIA Journal
- npj Science of Learning (in partnership with Springer Nature)
- Queensland Archaeological Research (1984–2011, now published by JCU)
- Queensland Historical Atlas
- TEMPUS: Archaeology and Material Culture Studies in Anthropology, monograph series.
- The University of Queensland Law Journal

=== Academic reputation ===
University rankings

Global – Overall
- ARWU World: 65 (2025)
- CWTS World: 58 (Note: The CWTS Leiden Ranking is based on P (top 10%).) (2024)
- QS World: =42 (2026)
- QS Employability: =63 (2022)
- THE World: =80 (2026)
- THE Reputation: 78 (2025)
- USNWR Global: 43 (25/26)

National – Overall
- ARWU National: 2 (2025)
- CWTS National: 5 (2024)
- ERA National: 2 (2018)
- QS National: 6 (2026)
- THE National: 6 (2026)
- USNWR National: 5 (25/26)
- AFR National: =2 (2025)

QS Global Subject Rankings
Program	Ranking
Accounting & Finance	48
Agriculture & Forestry	26
Anthropology	51–100
Biological Sciences	50
Business & Management	61
Chemical Engineering	45
Earth & Marine Sciences	51–100
Economics & Econometrics	72
English Language and Literature	50
Environmental Sciences	17
Education	30
Hospitality & Leisure Management	31
Law	43
Life Sciences and Medicine	32
Mathematics	92
Mineral & Mining Engineering	3
Nursing	=38
Pharmacy & Pharmacology	31
Physics & Astronomy	137
Politics & International Studies	51–100
Psychology	26
Sociology	46
Sports-Related Subjects	2
Veterinary Science	=26

THE Global Subject Rankings
Program	Ranking
Clinical, Pre-Clinical and Health	56
Life Sciences	32
Physical Sciences	70
Psychology	28
Business and Economics	51
Education	40
Law	72
Social Sciences	77
Engineering and Technology	54
Computer Science	114
Arts and Humanities	91

In the 2024 Aggregate Ranking of Top Universities, which measures aggregate performance across the QS, THE and ARWU rankings, the university attained a position of #53 (4th nationally).

National publications

In the Australian Financial Review Best Universities Ranking 2025, the university was tied #2 amongst Australian universities.

Global publications

In the 2026 Quacquarelli Symonds World University Rankings (published 2025), the university attained a tied position of #42 (6th nationally).

In the Times Higher Education World University Rankings 2026 (published 2025), the university attained a tied position of #80 (6th nationally).

In the 2025 Academic Ranking of World Universities, the university attained a position of #65 (2nd nationally).

In the 2025–2026 U.S. News & World Report Best Global Universities, the university attained a position of #43 (5th nationally).

In the CWTS Leiden Ranking 2024, the university attained a position of #58 (5th nationally).

=== Student outcomes ===
The Australian Government's QILT (Note: Abbreviation for Quality Indicators for Learning and Teaching.) conducts national surveys documenting the student life cycle from enrolment through to employment. These surveys place more emphasis on criteria such as student experience, graduate outcomes and employer satisfaction than perceived reputation, research output and citation counts.

In the 2023 Employer Satisfaction Survey, graduates of the university had an overall employer satisfaction rate of 86.4%.

In the 2023 Graduate Outcomes Survey, graduates of the university had a full-time employment rate of 81.3% for undergraduates and 86.8% for postgraduates. The initial full-time salary was A$70,900 for undergraduates and A$88,900 for postgraduates.

In the 2023 Student Experience Survey, undergraduates at the university rated the quality of their entire educational experience at 77.9% meanwhile postgraduates rated their overall education experience at 76%.

== Student life ==
The University of Queensland maintains a number of support and student services. The campuses at St Lucia and Gatton have Student Centres which provide information and support services.

=== Student union ===
The UQ Union is the peak student representation body that coordinates various student services and activities, including over 190 affiliated clubs and societies, some of whom are listed below.

- Semper Floreat – University of Queensland Student Newspaper
- University of Queensland Australian Football Club
- University of Queensland Debating Society (UQDS)
- University of Queensland Football Club
- Queensland University Regiment
- University of Queensland Rugby Club
- UQ Newman Catholic Society, which was the university's first official student society

=== Sports and athletics ===
UQ Sport offers a wide range of sport, fitness and recreation opportunities at the St Lucia and Gatton campuses of the University of Queensland. Its facilities and services are open to students, staff, alumni, and the general public.

The UQ Athletics Centre maintains an Olympic standard 8 lane synthetic track and grandstand able to accommodate up to 565 spectators. The UQ Sport and Fitness Centre is a multi-purpose indoor facility.

The UQ Tennis Centre is the largest tennis centre in both Brisbane and Queensland. The UQ Playing Fields and Ovals is also managed by UQ Sport, home to a total of eight oval fields at the St Lucia campus. The majority are designated for use by particular sports including cricket, rugby and soccer. These ovals are also used for recreational activities and lunchtime social sport.

=== Residential colleges ===
The University of Queensland has 11 residential colleges with 10 of these located on its St Lucia campus and one on its Gatton campus. The University of Queensland Intercollege Council is the organisational and representative body for the residential colleges which coordinates sporting and cultural events and competitions.

- Cromwell College is a co-ed college founded in 1950. It is affiliated with the Uniting Church and accommodates 249 students.
- Duchesne College is a women's only college founded in 1937 in Toowong, moving the university in 1959. It is affiliated with the Society of the Sacred Heart and accommodates 210 students.
- Emmanuel College is a co-educational college founded in 1911. It accommodates 340 students.
- Gatton Halls of Residence was established in 1897 and has 440 residential students, making it by far the largest and oldest college at the university.
- Grace College is a women's college founded in 1970. It accommodates 181 students.
- International House is a co-educational college for International and Australian students founded in 1965.
- King's College provides accommodation for 320 male and female students of the university.
- St John's College is a co-educational college founded in 1911. It is administered by the Anglican Diocese of Brisbane.
- St Leo's College is a men's college affiliated with the Roman Catholic Archdiocese of Brisbane.
- Union College is a co-educational, secular college named after the student union. It is listed on the Queensland Heritage Register.
- Women's College is a college for female students.

=== Transportation ===
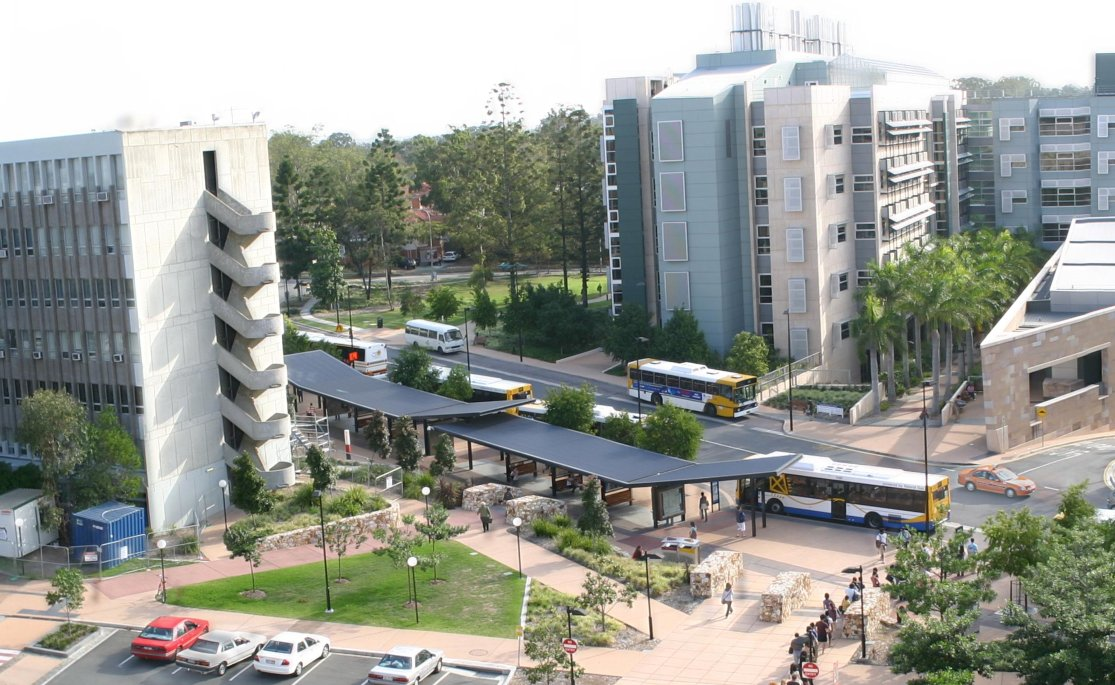
Chancellor's Place Bus stop, Institute for Molecular Bioscience

The university is served by the UQ St Lucia ferry wharf, the westernmost stop and terminus of the CityCat service. Translink also operates two bus stations on campus: the University of Queensland bus station at Chancellor's Place in the west, connecting passengers to Brisbane's inner west suburbs such as Indooroopilly, Toowong and Milton; and the UQ Lakes busway station in the east, the western terminus of the Eastern Busway, with services to Brisbane's inner south suburbs such as Woolloongabba, Carindale and Mount Gravatt via the Eleanor Schonell Bridge. This bridge also allows pedestrians and cyclists to cross the Brisbane River, to reach Dutton Park. The closest stops of the Queensland Rail city network are the Toowong railway station, Boggo Road railway station (formerly Park Road railway station), and Dutton Park railway station.

== Notable people ==
=== Notable alumni ===
UQ has produced numerous distinguished alumni. Several notable examples include recipient of a Nobel Prize in Physiology and Medicine Peter C. Doherty, recipient of the "Triple Crown of Acting" (having won Primetime Emmy, Tony and Academy Awards) Geoffrey Rush, triple Grammy Award-winning musician Tim Munro, former Chief Justices of Australia Sir Gerard Brennan and Sir Harry Gibbs, international not-for-profit 'Hear and Say' founder and officer of the order of Australia Dimity Dornan, Principal of King's College London Edward Byrne, singer and eurovision representative Dami Im, former CEO of Dow Chemical Andrew Liveris, the first female Governor-General of Australia Dame Quentin Bryce, former Singaporean Minister of Defence and Manpower Lee Boon Yang, Singaporean actor Tommy Wong, consecutive Olympic gold medal-winning swimmer David Theile, highly cited epidemiologist Graham Colditz, international best-selling author Kate Morton, CEO of MS Research Australia and Harvard Club of Australia fellow Matthew Miles, alleged war criminal and former general manager of Seven Brisbane Ben Roberts-Smith, and Fijian diplomat Merewalesi Falemaka.

== Controversies ==
=== Relationship with the Confucius Institute ===
Apparent links with the Confucius Institute, a Chinese government-supported international education partnership program, have been controversial for UQ. The university offered 13 courses co-funded by the institute, mainly around Chinese arts, media and language. Critics of these courses claimed Chinese government influence on the course content, while UQ contested that they were developed by university academics without external contribution.In April 2025 the university, along with a number of other Australian universities, closed its Confucius Centre.

=== Student suspensions ===
On 29 May 2020, the UQ disciplinary board issued a two-year suspension to activist Drew Pavlou for alleged bullying, discrimination and harassment of university students and staff. Pavlou has contested the reasoning describing in a statement released on Twitter that his suspension was "to silence [him] for [his] political activism", something denied by both the university, and the disciplinary and appeals boards. Pavlou has admitted to swearing at other students on Facebook and an online university forum. An appeal to the UQ Senate Disciplinary Appeals Committee resulted in the committee endorsing two counts of serious misconduct, however reducing the suspension from two years to one semester.

In June 2020, Pavlou launched a second lawsuit in the Supreme Court seeking A$3.5 million in damages from the university for alleged defamation and a breach of contract. In September 2020, the Queensland Crime and Corruption Commission declined a request by Pavlou to investigate UQ Chancellor Peter Varghese and former Vice-Chancellor Peter Høj, citing that there was "insufficient evidence to suggest anyone who was subject of the complaint had engaged in corrupt conduct.

=== Sexual assaults ===
Between 2011 and 2016 there were 38 reported cases of sexual assault and harassment on campus, resulting in 1 expulsion and 2 one-week suspensions. This included a report in 2015 where a staff member "filmed someone in the shower". These figures are lower than the 2017 Australian Human Rights Commission report on sexual assault and harassment. The vice-chancellor responded "there is no place for sexual assault or sexual harassment at UQ. Such behaviour is never the victim’s fault, and it will not be tolerated here" and introduced a number of new initiatives to address sexual assault problems.

=== Divestment ===
The University of Queensland's investment portfolio is a subject of ongoing debate. A fossil fuel divestment campaign began in 2013, led by the student group Fossil Free UQ and supported by the climate advocacy group 350.org. The goal of the campaign is "to freeze all new investments and phase out all current investments in coal, petroleum and gas over the next five years because fossil fuels drive climate change".

On 18 April 2016, students occupied the Vice-Chancellory stating, 'We are asking the university to remove investment from the top 200 most polluting companies in the world' and calling for greater transparency regarding University investments. The sit-in resulted in communication with the Vice-Chancellor in May 2016.

In October 2016, Fossil Free QUT provided a report to the University Senate. For the period July 2015 to June 2016 direct fossil fuel companies comprised an average of 3.82% of UQ's $169.2m investment portfolio. The University Senate voted not to divest from fossil fuels citing, 'that divestment would make no real difference'.

In September 2013, 350.org Australia released a report 'Exposing The Ties' to show 'shows how key decision makers at some of the country's leading tertiary institutions including the University of Queensland, University of Newcastle and University of New South Wales are non-executive directors or former employees of fossil fuel companies including AGL, BHP and Rio Tinto.' This showed The University of Queensland received $31 million from the Australian Coal Association Research Program (ACARP) and the university's Senate includes three non-executive directors of Senex Energy, Metro Mining and Queensland Investment Corporation, (owner of Epic Energy and Lochard Energy) and a former Queensland Resources Council board member and recipient of the Queensland Resources Council Medal.

Seven of the twenty-two members of the senate for UQ have interests in the fossil fuel industry, having ties with fossil fuel companies previously or currently.

In October 2017, ten students occupied the Chancellor's Office deeming the 2016 Senate vote on divestment illegitimate due to conflicts of interest. The students were removed by the Queensland Police Service.

In 2020, when the Prime Minister Scott Morrison was visiting, fifty students protested at the university, damaging university's property and the prime minister's car. Some students came close to the prime minister and used a blowhorn with sirens.

== See also ==
- AustLit, an Australian literature resource hosted by the School of Communication and Arts
- List of universities in Australia
- TC Beirne School of Law
