= Community for Open Antimicrobial Drug Discovery =

Not-for-profit research initiative

The Community for Open Antimicrobial Drug Discovery (CO-ADD) is a not-for-profit initiative created in 2015 reaching out to chemists in academia and research organisations who have compounds that were not designed as antibiotics and would not otherwise be screened for antimicrobial activity. These academic compounds are screened against a key panel of drug-resistant bacterial strains -superbugs. Multi-drug resistant microbes are a serious health treat, and exploration of novel chemical diversity is essential to find new antibiotics.

CO-ADD's goal is to find new, diverse compounds to combat the superbug crisis in screening chemical compounds for antimicrobial activity against key ESKAPE pathogens, E. coli, K. pneumoniae, A. baumannii, P. aeruginosa, S. aureus (MRSA), as well as the fungi C. neoformans and C. albicans.

CO-ADD is supported by the Wellcome Trust through a Strategic Award and The University of Queensland (Institute for Molecular Bioscience), where the compound screening facilities are located.

== Community ==
CO-ADD is a community-driven solution to the superbug crisis problem, providing chemists with:

- an open access antimicrobial drug discovery platform
- a low-barrier access to free antimicrobial screening
- a program to uncover and test chemical diversity sitting on chemists’ shelves
- a communal knowledge base for antimicrobial discovery

== The Superbug Crisis ==
Resistance of bacteria to commonly used antibiotics is increasing and contributes significantly to patient morbidity and mortality. Klebsiella species, Acinetobacter baumannii, P. aeruginosa, and Enterobacter species, together with the gram-positive Enterococcus faecium and Staphylococcus aureus are responsible for two-thirds of all health care-associated infections.

The World Health Organization (WHO) has declared antimicrobial resistance to be one of the greatest threats to human health. On World Health Day 2011, themed ‘combating antimicrobial resistance’, WHO issued an international call for concerted action to halt the spread of antimicrobial resistance, launching a six-point policy package, recommended for governments, which sets out the measures governments and their national partners need to combat drug resistance.
