= International House, University of Queensland =

Residential college at the University of Queensland

Coordinates: 27°29′47.67″S 153°00′32.53″E

International House
- University of Queensland
- Location: St Lucia Campus
- Motto: That Brotherhood May Prevail (Latin)
- Established: 1965
- Named for: International House organisation
- Gender: Co-educational
- Residents: 238
- Website: Homepage; Alumni and Community

International House (commonly abbreviated as IH) is a residential college situated on the St Lucia campus of the University of Queensland. IH provides fully catered accommodation for 223 undergraduate students, and self-catered accommodation for 19 self-catered students. Residents who live at IH are affectionately known around campus as 'Housies'.

International House's residents are 35% Australian and 65% international students from approximately 35 countries.

== History ==
The vision of an International House was inspired by an address made in October 1954, by Frank TM White, foundation Professor of Mining and Metallurgical Engineering, and also appointed Warden for Overseas Students. The following extract from Professor White's address, delivered in the socio-political context of Queensland in the mid-1950s, reveals the philosophy behind the vision that led to International House, a vision that remains relevant to the present.

"...students from (other) countries... have brought with them their cultures, their philosophies, their national customs. These young men and women... can become ambassadors for Australia upon their return home. Their presence among us affords a unique opportunity for the promotion of international understanding: this is... a University and community responsibility. ... there are three understandings which we as a community can promote: ... the values and cultures of other peoples;... the facts of world inter-dependence; (and) ... the means by which the people of one country can live at peace with those of other countries.

These all involve an understanding of the roots of human behaviour, and of the needs to explore ways of reconciling values which appear to conflict, and to devise means for training leaders..."

Planning commenced in 1955 through the Rotary Club of Brisbane, as part of the celebrations to mark the 50th anniversary of Rotary International. Professor White stepped down as Warden in December 1960 (he later took up a post at Canada's McGill University Faculty of Engineering), while planning continued under the auspices of a committee led by Bert Martin, businessman and district governor of Rotary International. On 15 June 1963, the Administrator of Queensland, Sir Alan Mansfield, unveiled the foundation stone for the residential college. According to institutional biographer Basil Shaw's authoritative account, "Eight years of erratic progress were over. They were years marked by expressions of racism and opposition in some quarters at the university; by bureaucratic red tape; by poor public recognition; and, despite the dedication of the fundraisers, by desultory financial responses and poor returns. (Yet it was)... determined that International House would open by March 1965. A lot had to be achieved in a short time."

Bert Martin saw the project thorough to completion. As district governor of Rotary International District 35, he was president of the Council of International House for the period 1955 to 1962, and retained that position until the committee was replaced by the board of governors as the executive body of council in June 1962 following revision of the constitution. He became president of the board of governors in 1963, holding this office until 1986, thus completing thirty years of service to International House.

When International House opened in 1965, Dr Ivor Cribb was appointed its first warden.

Heads of College

1965-1986 Dr Ivor Cribb - Warden

1987-1999 Dr Neil Holm - Warden then Director

1999-2002 Dr David Pear - Director

2002 Geoffrey Andrews - Director

2002-2003 Prof. George Watt - Director

2003-2024 Dr. Carla Tromans - Director/CEO

2024-2025 Helen Jamieson - Director/CEO

== Architecture ==
The physical design of International House was led by eminent Queensland architect Stephen Trotter. In 1962, Trotter was awarded a travelling scholarship which he used to spend three months in subtropical regions of the world to develop ideas applicable to Brisbane. His study tour culminated in Cities in the Sun (published 1963), which detailed energy efficient and environmentally friendly design methods better suited to Queensland's climate than the prevailing European styles emerging in Sydney, Melbourne and Brisbane. His iconic design for IH was influenced by this then-novel train of thought and described as having both a distinctively 'part Oriental, part early Queensland' appearance. The Courier-Mail, 19 December 1962, featured a photograph of the scale model of International House, and Trotter reported as saying that he thought "Queensland architecture would develop a more Asiatic character because of the similarity of the Asian and Queensland climates. Buildings in South-East Asia and India used large overhangs which incorporated verandahs and balconies, thus making optimum use of shade. Flow-through ventilation was achieved by the use of louvres." In 2011, IH recognized Trotter's contribution by investing him as a Fellow of International House.

== Academic life ==
International House has comprehensive learning resources for its students, including study rooms and tutoring services.

== Sporting life ==
IH offers residents the opportunity to play sports, and claims a great team spirit and a high participation level on the field. For those off field, supporters don black and gold (IH college colours) to support their fellow "Housies", and vocalise their support with chants to show college spirit. IH has excelled in Volleyball, Soccer & Table Tennis in recent years. Residents also have free access to the University of Queensland Gym & Aquatics Facilities.

== Rooms ==
International House comprises 11 buildings or 'towers', which offer the largest student accommodation in room size on Campus. Towers A to I are for undergraduate students and Towers J and K are for postgraduate and mature aged undergraduate students (25 years and over). Each Tower consists of 5 to 6 levels. Each floor of each tower (for undergraduate students) houses 4 to 5 residents with a shared bathroom (and washing bases and toilet) as well as common room with the exception of G tower where it houses 12 residents per floor.

== Location ==
International House is situated in close proximity to both Cromwell College and Grace College; the three colleges are collectively known as the 'Hill Colleges' or the 'Hood Street Trio'.

== See also ==
- University of Queensland
