= Memorial Tablet (poem) =

Poem by Siegfried Sassoon

Memorial Tablet

Squire nagged and bullied till I went to fight,
(Under Lord Derby's scheme). I died in hell—
(They called it Passchendaele). My wound was slight,
And I was hobbling back; and then a shell
Burst slick upon the duckboards: so I fell
Into the bottomless mud, and lost the light.

At sermon-time, while Squire is in his pew,
He gives my gilded name a thoughtful stare;
For, though low down upon the list, I'm there;
'In proud and glorious memory'. . .that's my due.
Two bleeding years I fought in France, for Squire:
I suffered anguish that he's never guessed.
Once I came home on leave: and then went west. . .
What greater glory could a man desire?

Memorial Tablet is a war poem by Siegfried Sassoon, written in October 1918 and first published in his 1919 collection Picture-Show. The original manuscript is held by Cambridge University Library. Sassoon had by this time been invalided out of the army and the war had only a month to run.

The poem is narrated in the first person by a dead soldier. The soldier, a man from a lower-class background used to obeying the orders of the local Squire, who "nagged and bullied" local men to go and fight for their country "under Lord Derby's Scheme." In the poem, the soldier describes the manner of his own death at the Battle of Passchendaele. The Squire stayed safe at home and did not go to war; there is an implication that he was fully aware of the danger. The poem goes on to describe the soldier's death when he slipped from the duckboards when a shell hit the trench and drowned in mud, a pointless death. The soldier finds that his name on a memorial is the only thing he has to show for his life, and feels that the Squire, looking on from his pew in the church, cannot imagine the suffering of the men he sent to the Front. Like many of Sassoon's poems, "Memorial Tablet" has a bitterly ironic punchline. After describing his own sordid death and the inadequacy of the memorial, the narrator asks: "What greater glory could a man desire?"

"Memorial Tablet" was used as the title of a CD released in 2003, containing readings by Sassoon and other war poets, and music by Edward Elgar.
