= List of University of Queensland people =

This is a list of University of Queensland people. The University of Queensland has numerous notable alumni and faculty.

== Notable alumni ==
=== Academia ===
- Jock R. Anderson, agricultural economist at the World Bank; emeritus professor at the University of New England
- Paul Brindley, professor of microbiology, immunology, and tropical medicine at George Washington University
- Edward Byrne, Principal of King's College London; Vice-Chancellor of Monash University
- Colin Clark, economist
- Raymond Dart, anatomist and anthropologist, who discovered the first fossil of an Australopithecus africanus
- Peter C. Doherty, immunologist, Nobel Prize recipient and former Australian of the Year
- Joshua Gans, economist
- Peter D. Harrison FAHA, Emeritus Professor of History and Philosophy, former Andreas Idreos Professor of Science and Religion at the University of Oxford, Australian Laureate fellow and Founding Director of the Institute for Advanced Studies in the Humanities (IASH). In 2019, he delivered the prestigious University of Oxford Bampton Lectures.
- Sam Hawgood, Chancellor of University of California, San Francisco
- Colleen Higgins, plant pathologist in New Zealand
- Dorothy Hill, palaeontologist, who was described as the "most distinguished scholar of the first 75 years of the University of Queensland"
- Ove Hoegh-Guldberg, biologist and climate scientist known as a leading in the effects of climate change on coral reefs
- Philip Hogg, Head of ACRF Centenary Cancer Research Center at the Centenary Institute
- Donald Markwell, social scientist and Warden of Rhodes House
- Michael McRobbie, 18th President of Indiana University
- Dirk Moses, historian, professor of modern history at the University of Sydney, widely regarded as a leading expert on the history of genocide and ethnic cleansing, and on the history of colonialism
- Adrian Pagan, economist
- James Page, educationist
- A. W. Pryor, physicist
- Chandreshekhar Sonwane, Indian American Scientist
- Professor Paul Thomas AM, founding Vice-Chancellor of University of the Sunshine Coast
- Colin Murray Turbayne, Professor of Philosophy at University of Rochester and internationally recognized scholar on the works of George Berkeley
- Chelsea Watego, Indigenous health researcher
- Frank T. M. White, Foundation Professor, Mining and Metallurgical Engineering, University of Queensland; Macdonald Professor of Mining Engineering and Applied Geophysics, McGill University
- Franklin White, public health scientist focused on capacity building for international and global health
- Joy Wolfram, nanoscientist
- Craig Steven Wright, computer scientist, one of the possible inventors of the Bitcoin digital currency
- Patsy Yates, registered nurse specialized in palliative care, Distinguished Professor and Executive Dean of the Faculty of Health, Queensland University of Technology (Brisbane)

=== Arts ===
- Thea Astley, writer and four times winner of the Miles Franklin Award
- John Birmingham, novelist
- Bille Brown, actor and playwright
- Dale Camilleri, actor
- Ross Clark, poet
- Nick Earls, novelist
- Janet Fielding, actress
- Janet Fletcher, linguist
- Ron Grainer, composer
- Matt Granfield, writer
- Steven Herrick, writer
- Janette Turner Hospital, writer
- Astrid Jorgensen, musician
- Madhan Karky, lyricist, screenwriter
- Bronwyn Lea, poet
- David Malouf, writer
- Geoffrey Rush, actor and Academy Award recipient
- Erroll Shand, New Zealand actor
- Karin Schaupp, guitarist
- Joseph Twist, composer
- Kim Wilkins, writer
- Anita Monro, theologian, academic and Uniting Church in Australia minister

=== Business ===
- Kathryn Fagg AO, chair of the CSIRO from 2021
- Richard Goodmanson, former COO of Dupont; Board of Qantas
- Sir Ronald Gordon Jackson AK, businessman
- Andrew N. Liveris, CEO of Dow Chemical Company, second largest chemical manufacturer in the world
- Vaine Nooana-Arioka, Executive Director of the Bank of the Cook Islands
- V Pappas, former chief operating officer of TikTok

=== Judicial ===
- Sir Gerard Brennan, former Chief Justice of the High Court of Australia
- Ian Callinan, former Justice of the High Court of Australia
- Sir Walter Campbell, former Governor of Queensland and Chief Justice of Queensland
- Paul de Jersey, former Chief Justice of Queensland
- Clare Foley, lawyer
- Sir Harry Gibbs, former Chief Justice of the High Court of Australia
- Sir Mostyn Hanger, former Chief Justice of Queensland
- Stanley Jones, Justice of the Supreme Court of Queensland
- Sir Buri Kidu, former Chief Justice of Papua New Guinea
- Susan Kiefel, former Chief Justice of the High Court of Australia
- Margaret McMurdo, former President of the Queensland Court of Appeal
- Sir Noel Power, Vice-President of the Hong Kong Court of Appeal (Acting Chief Justice 1996–1997)
- Russell Skerman, Justice of the Supreme Court of Queensland
- Sir William Webb, former Justice of the High Court of Australia and President of the International Military Tribunal for the Far East

=== Media ===
- Tim Arvier, Nine News Queensland state political reporter and former US correspondent
- Robert Bell, host of the Channel 10 programme Scope
- Tracey Challenor, former journalist with Seven News
- Melissa Downes, weekday co-presenter of Nine News Queensland
- Heather Foord, former journalist with Nine News Queensland
- Sylvia Jeffreys, news presenter on Today
- George Negus, author and journalist
- Andrew Olle, television and radio presenter (ABC, Nine Network), dropped out after the first year
- Cameron Price, former reporter for Nine News Queensland and Seven News Sydney
- Ben Roberts-Smith, former general manager of Seven Brisbane and former Australian soldier
- Michael Ware, journalist, war correspondent
- Lis Wiehl, author and television legal analyst
- Marian Wilkinson, Walkley award winning journalist

=== Medicine ===
- Graham Colditz, chronic disease epidemiologist, one of the global top three most cited academic
- Michael Gabbett, clinical geneticist
- Adele Green, epidemiologist
- Mohamed Yakub Janabi - Regional Director WHO Regional Office for Africa
- Mary Mahoney, medical practitioner and academic
- Jian Zhou, co-inventor of Gardasil

=== Military ===
- General Peter Gration, former Chief of the Defence Force and Chief of the General Staff
- Major General Jim Molan
- Ben Roberts-Smith, Australian war criminal

=== Politics ===
==== Premiers ====
- Michael Ahern, Premier of Queensland 1987–1989
- Peter Beattie, Premier of Queensland 1998–2007
- Anna Bligh, Premier of Queensland 2007–2012, first female Premier
- Wayne Goss, Premier of Queensland 1989–1996
- Mark McGowan, Premier of Western Australia 2017–2023
- Steven Miles, Premier of Queensland 2023–2024
- Campbell Newman, Lord Mayor of Brisbane 2004–2011; Premier of Queensland 2012–2015
- Annastacia Palaszczuk, Premier of Queensland 2015–2023

==== State Members of Parliament ====
- Cameron Dick, Treasurer and Minister for Investment; State Member for Woodridge
- Stirling Hinchliffe, Minister for Local Government; State member for Sandgate
- Anthony Lynham, Minister for Natural Resources, Mines and Energy; State member for Stafford
- Evan Moorhead, former member for the Electoral district of Waterford; former Secretary of the Australian Labor Party in Queensland
- Curtis Pitt, Speaker of the Legislative Assembly of Queensland
- Mark Ryan, Minister for Police; State member for Morayfield

==== Federal Members of Parliament ====
- George Brandis, former Senator for Queensland, Attorney-General, Leader of the Government in the Senate and High Commissioner to the United Kingdom
- Elizabeth Watson-Brown, Member of the Australian House of Representatives for Ryan
- Max Chandler-Mather, Member of the Australian House of Representatives for Griffith
- Stephen Bates, Member of the Australian House of Representatives for Brisbane
- Trevor Evans, former Member of the Australian House of Representatives for Brisbane
- Garth Hamilton, current Member of the Australian House of Representatives for Groom
- Bob Katter, current Member of the Australian Parliament for Kennedy and leader of Katter's Australian Party
- Chris Ketter, former Senator for Queensland
- Michael Macklin, Australian Democrat Senator elected while a staff member at UQ
- Clive Palmer, leader of the Palmer United Party; former member for Fairfax
- Drew Pavlou, unsuccessfully ran for Australian senate during the 2022 general election under the Drew Pavlou Democratic Alliance
- Wyatt Roy, youngest ever politician elected to Australian Parliament; former MP for Longman (failed to complete his undergraduate degree)
- Wayne Swan, former Treasurer of Australia and Deputy Prime Minister
- Murray Watt, Senator for Queensland; Former state member for Everton

==== Local government ====
- Sallyanne Atkinson, politician and first female Lord Mayor of Brisbane

==== Outside Australia ====
- Ernest Aderman, Member of Parliament in New Zealand
- Raja Juli Antoni, 2nd Deputy Minister for Agrarian Affairs and Spatial Planning and Secretary-General of Indonesian Solidarity Party
- Prof. Ranjith Bandara, Member of Parliament in Sri Lanka
- Tan Sri Khalid Ibrahim, 14th Chief Minister of Selangor, Malaysia
- Ludwig Keke, Nauruan politician, Member of Parliament (1968–1972, 1989–1995, 1997–2000), Speaker of Parliament (1998–2000), and Ambassador to Taiwan (2007–2016)
- Taneti Maamau, current President of Kiribati.
- Ahmed Shaheed, former Maldives Minister of Foreign Affairs and former Special Rapporteur on Human Rights in Iran
- Lee Boon Yang, former Singaporean Cabinet Minister

=== Public service ===
- Elisabeth Bowes, diplomat and trade policy advisor
- Francis Patrick Donovan, diplomat and jurist
- Max Moore-Wilton, former head of the Department of Prime Minister and Cabinet

=== Sport ===
- Natalie Cook, Olympic gold medallist, beach volleyball
- John Eales, former rugby union captain
- Thomas Lawton, former rugby union captain, Waratah Rugby player, Oxford Blue
- Mark Loane, former rugby union captain
- Michael Lynagh, former rugby union captain
- Greg Martin, former rugby union player and rugby commentator
- Lloyd McDermott, first Aboriginal person to represent Australia in rugby union, and the nation's first indigenous barrister
- John Roe, former Queensland rugby union captain
- Nathan Sharpe, former rugby union captain
- Lev Susany, powerlifter and Commonwealth record holder
- David Theile, Olympic medallist in swimming
- Clem Windsor, former rugby union player

=== Vice Regal ===
Those listed here may also be listed elsewhere, notably Politics and Public Service.

- Peter Arnison, Governor of Queensland
- Quentin Bryce, Governor-General of Australia 2008–2014
- Sir Walter Campbell, former Governor of Queensland and Chief Justice of Queensland
- Paul de Jersey, Governor of Queensland 2014–2021
- Leneen Forde, Governor of Queensland 1992–1997
- Bill Hayden, Governor-General of Australia 1989–1996, Foreign Minister, Federal Treasurer and Federal Opposition Leader
- Penelope Wensley, Governor of Queensland 2008–2014

=== Other ===
- Karen Gallman, Miss Intercontinental 2018
- Ken Ham, creationist; founder of Answers in Genesis and the Creation Museum
- Ann Jones, environmental journalist, ABC radio and television presenter
- Aila Inkero Keto, conservationist; recognized in the United Nations Environment Program's Global 500 Roll of Honour 1988
- Elizabeth Powell, scientist
- Lilla Watson, Indigenous Australian activist, visual artist and academic
- Zhao Na, Miss Universe Asia 2025.

== Notable past and present staff ==
- Freda Bage, biology lecturer and first principal of the Women's College at UQ
- Dana Bergstrom, senior lecturer in ecology and botany, Antarctic researcher
- Brit Andresen, Emeritus Professor in Architecture at UQ
- Quentin Bryce, former Governor of Queensland, former Governor-General of Australia, law lecturer at UQ
- Kathleen Campbell-Brown, French lecturer at UQ
- Christina Cho, adjunct professor in architecture, a director of Cox Architecture
- Raphael Cilento, honorary professor of medicine
- Colin Clark, economist
- Cyril John Connell, former registrar
- Sir Zelman Cowen, former vice-chancellor, former Governor-General of Australia, Privy Councillor
- Margaret Cribb, government and political science lecturer
- Frank Cumbrae-Stewart, founding registrar and librarian and Professor of Law at UQ
- Robert Elson, historian
- Robert Endean, marine biologist
- Michael Scott Fletcher, foundation master of King's College and Professor of Philosophy at UQ
- Elwyn Flint, senior lecturer, linguist
- Josephine Forbes, Professor of Medicine
- Ian Frazer, virologist and former Australian of the Year
- Mary Garson, chemist
- Alexander James Gibson, first Professor of Engineering at UQ
- Robert Gilbert, chemist
- Ernest James Goddard, Professor of Biology at UQ
- John Harsanyi, Nobel Memorial Prize in Economic Sciences, UQ economics lecturer 1954
- Roger Hawken, Professor of Engineering
- Dorothy Hill, palaeontologist; first female professor appointed at an Australian university; first female President of the Professorial Board
- Rodney Huddleston, linguist
- Jolanda Jetten, social psychologist
- Thomas Harvey Johnston, Professor of Biology at UQ
- Lewis Keeble, former President of both the Royal Town Planning Institute (UK) and the Planning Institute of Australia
- Michael Lattke, religious studies
- Elton Mayo, first Professor of Philosophy at UQ
- Neal Menzies, former Vice-President of the International Union of Soil Sciences
- John Lundie Michie, first Professor of Classics at UQ
- John Moorhead, historian
- Donald Nicklin, retired Professor of Chemical Engineering and Pro Vice Chancellor for Physical Sciences
- Michael Nielsen, quantum physicist, formerly at the Perimeter Institute for Theoretical Physics
- Thomas Parnell, first Professor of Physics at UQ, who started the pitch drop experiment
- Sandro Porceddu, radiation oncologist
- Hugh Possingham, conservation biologist
- Elizabeth Powell, Director, Centre for Liver Disease Research
- Henry Priestley, first Professor of Mathematics at UQ
- John Quiggin, economist
- Suri Ratnapala, law
- Henry Caselli Richards, first Professor of Geology at UQ
- Frederick Walter Robinson, founder of UQ's Fryer Library
- Dorothea Sandars, parasitologist
- Fred Schonell, founding Professor of Education and Vice-Chancellor
- Jeremiah Joseph Stable, first Professor of English at UQ
- Bertram Steele, first Professor of Chemistry at UQ
- Roland Sussex, linguist
- Clem Tisdell, economist
- Graeme Turner, President of the Australian Academy of the Humanities
- Joseph Twist, composer
- Hermiene Ulrich, first female lecturer at UQ
- Lilla Watson, Indigenous Australian activist, visual artist and academic
- Frank T. M. White, founding Professor of Mining and Metallurgical Engineering
- Ghil'ad Zuckermann, linguist, revivalist, President of the Australian Association for Jewish Studies

== Administration ==
=== Chancellors ===
- 1910–1915 – Sir William MacGregor
- 1915–1922 – Sir Pope Alexander Cooper
- 1922–1925 – Lt-Col. Sir Matthew Nathan
- 1925–1927 – Andrew Joseph Thynne
- 1927–1944 – Sir James Blair
- 1944–1953 – William Forgan Smith
- 1953–1957 – Otto Hirschfeld
- 1957–1966 – Sir Albert Axon
- 1966–1976 – Sir Alan Mansfield
- 1977–1985 – Sir Walter Campbell
- 1985–1992 – Sir James Foots
- 1993–2009 – Sir Llewellyn Edwards
- 2009–2015 – John Story
- 2016–2016 – Jane Wilson (acting)
- 2016–2026 – Peter Varghese
- 2026-Present - Emeritus Professor Mary O'Kane

=== Vice Chancellors ===
- 1910–1916 – Reginald Heber Roe
- 1916–1925 – Andrew Joseph Thynne
- 1925–1938 – William Nathaniel Robertson
- 1938–1959 – John Douglas Story
- 1960–1969 – Sir Fred Schonell
- 1970–1977 – Sir Zelman Cowen
- 1979–1996 – Brian Wilson, Australia's longest serving Vice-Chancellor
- 1996–2007 – John A. Hay
- 2008–2012 – Paul Greenfield
- 2012–2012 – Deborah Terry (acting)
- 2012–2020 – Peter Høj
- 2020–present – Deborah Terry

== See also ==
- Category:University of Queensland alumni
- University of Queensland Union (UQU)
