= 1992 Queen's Birthday Honours (Australia) =

The 1992 Queen's Birthday Honours for Australia were announced on Monday 8 June 1992 by the office of the Governor-General.

The Birthday Honours were appointments by some of the 16 Commonwealth realms of Queen Elizabeth II to various orders and honours to reward and highlight good works by citizens of those countries. The Birthday Honours are awarded as part of the Queen's Official Birthday celebrations during the month of June.

== Order of Australia ==
=== Companion (AC) ===
==== General Division ====
Recipient	Citation	Notes
Arthur Merric Bloomfield Boyd, OBE AO	For service to the visual arts and to the development of Australian artists and crafts people	
Professor Jacqueline Jarrett Goodnow	For service to research into child development and education in the discipline of psychology	
The Honourable Justice Barry James Maddern	For service to industrial relations as President of the Australian Industrial Relations Commission	
Emeritus Professor John Arthur Passmore	For service to philosophy, particularly the history of philosophy and the history of ideas	
His Excellency Rear Admiral Peter Ross Sinclair, AO	For service to the Crown as Governor of New South Wales	
Roger Robert Woodward, OBE	For service to music, particularly as a pianist and to the promotion of Australian composition	

=== Officer (AO) ===
==== General Division ====
Recipient	Citation	Notes
Ian Glencross Radcliffe Burgess	For service to commerce	
Professor Peter Anthony Castaldi	For service to medicine, particularly in the fields of haematosis and thrombosis	
The Honourable Donald Leslie Chipp	For service to the Australian Parliament, particularly as founder and leader of the Australian Democrats	
David Stuart Clarke	For service to business and to the community	
The Honourable Michael Arthur Cleary	For service to the New South Wales Parliament	
The Honourable Judith Jacqueline Cohen	For service to industrial relations	
Kevin John Croagh	For service to the community and to manufacturing	
Professor Henrique Antonio D'Assumpcao	For service to science and technology	
Professor Mervyn John Eadie	For service to the medicine, particularly neurology and to neuropharmacology	
Dr Vivian George Eyers	For service to teacher education training and to year 12 curriculum development	
His Excellency Philip James Flood	For service to international relations	
Sir James William Foots	For service to the community and to business	
Dr Joan Forrest Gardner	For service to medicine in the field of sterilisation, disinfection and infection control	
Professor Ian David Gust	For service to public health, particularly in the prevention of Hepatitis and AIDS	
Reverend Dr Francis Henry Harman	For service to bioethics, to religion and to education	
Thomas Plunkett Hayes	For service to international organisations and for public service	
Dr Alan Kenneth Head	For service to science through research into the structure of solids and its application to industry	
The Honourable (acting) Justice Jack Austell Lee	For service to the law and to the community	
Dr Patricia Mather	For service to marine biology, particularly in the fields of Ascidian research and reef science	
John Neil McCallum, CBE	For service to the performing arts	
The Honourable Ian George Medcalf, ED QC	For service to the law, to the Western Australian Parliament and to the community	
James Mollison, AM	For service to arts administration	
Professor John Rodney Niland	For service to industrial relations and to tertiary education	
Dr Mark Francis O'Brien	For service to medicine as a cardiovascular surgeon and to the community	
Peter Joseph Redlich	For service to business and to the arts	
Robert Duncan Somervaille, AM	For service to media and to the Australian space industry	
Ian Ernest Webber	For service to the transport industry	
The Honourable Justice James Michael White	For service to the law and to the community	
Reginald Murray Williams, CMG	For service to business and to the community	
Professor Glenn Alexander Withers	For service to applied economics, particularly in the areas of immigration and population research	
Professor Leslie Ronald Zines	For service to the Australian legal system, particularly in the field of constitutional law	

==== Military Division ====
Branch	Recipient	Citation	Notes
Navy	Principal Chaplain The Rev Monsignor Ian Thomas Dempsey	For service to the Royal Australian Navy as the Director General Chaplaincy	
Army	Major General John Curtis Hartley, AM	For service to the General Officer Commanding Training Command	
Air Force	Air Vice Marshal William Macdonald Collins, AM	For service to the Royal Australian Air Force as Air Officer Commanding Logistics Command	

=== Member (AM) ===
==== General Division ====
Recipient	Citation	Notes
Terence Lewis Addison	For service to the trade union movement	
Professor Ken Francis Adkins	For service to dentistry	
Keith William Allison	For service to the rural community, particularly through rural lands protection boards and the provision of services	
Robert Edward Joseph Allman, OBE	For service to the performing arts, particularly opera	
Freddy Argy, OBE	For service to national economic planning	
Francis Neville Arkell	For service to the local government, New South Wakes parliament and to the community	
Professor Douglas Kevin Baird	For service to medicine and youth	
William Robert Ricardo Beggs	For service to primary industry, particularly through the wool industry and the Royal Agricultural Society of Victoria	
Emeritus Professor Alan Reginald Billings	For service to electric and electronic engineering and to education	
Wendy Blacklock	For service to the performing arts	
Bennie David Bodna	For service to the community as public advocate for Victoria	
Ronald Barrie Bodycoat	For service to architecture, heritage and conservation	
Ruth Wingate Bright	For service to community health through music therapy	
Gregory John William Bunbury	For service to superannuation administration	
Winsome Claire Bundey	For service to social welfare and to education	
Dr Charles Bryan Campbell	For service to medical administration	
Harold William Caulfield	For service to horticulture	
Geoffrey Donald Chisholm	For service to the Tasmanian Parliament	
Geoffrey Elliott Coles	For service to the retailing industry	
Agathocles Agathocleous Constantine, OAM	For service to the sport of soccer	
John Arthur Cook	For service to international trade and relations	
Leonard Edgar Couchman	For service to entomology	
Margaret Neville Cribb	For service to education and to women's affairs	
Keith Martin Cys	For service to the trade union movement and to the community	
Shirley Davies	For service to women's hockey	
Dr David De Souza	For service to community health	
Kenneth Spephen Done	For service to art and design and to the tourist industry	
Joie Elwyn Dwyer	For service to youth, particularly through the Girl Guides Association and to the community	
Dr Meredith Ann Edwards	For service to social welfare and to education	
Colonel Nellie Jane Espie, RRC	For service to veterans and nursing	
Barry Peter Flanagan	For service to the electricity and electrical engineering industry	
Norman Arthur Gampe	For service to local government	
Patrick Geraghty	For service to the Seaman's Union of Australia	
Graham Robert Gregory	For service to horticulture, particularly in the area of viticulture	
Allan Neville Hall	For public service, particularly in the field of administrative law	
Hugh Ross Hamilton	For service to the trade union movement and workplace reform	
Ronald Charles Douglas Hanmer	For service to music and musical education	
Leonard Norton Hingley	For service to the trade union movement and to the community	
Warren Michael Horton	For service to librarianship	
S. E. K. Hulme AM QC	For service to the law	
Jessop Basset Grey Hulton	For service to the environment and to tourism	
The Honourable Alan John Hunt, MLC	For service to the Victorian Parliament	
Eric Clifton Iles	For service to industrial relations local government and to the community	
Professor Jorg Imberger	For service to civil engineering and to education	
Clive James	For service to the media, particularly as a television broadcaster	
Ronald Lewis Hale Johnson	For service to the community, particularly as Grand Master of the United Grand Lodge of New South Wales	
Dr Desmond Roy Kelly	For service to the mining industry	
Donald Moreton Kendell	For service to air transport	
Stepan Kerkyasharian	For service to the ethnic community and to multicultural broadcasting	
Laurence James Kiernan	For service to the community, particularly through fundraising for charity	
Dr Patricia Mary Lahy	For service to education	
Ethel Isabel Lang	For service to the arts, particularly as a radio performer and to the community	
Robert Raymond Leane	For service to the community	
Lionel Norman Ledlie	For service to industrial relations	
Dr Elizabeth Ann Lewis	For service to medicine, particularly in the field of neurosurgery, and to medical administration	
Dr Thomas Michael Mackenzie Long	For service to medicine, particularly as a surgeon, and to the Royal Flying Doctor Service	
The Honourable Justice Ray Francis Loveday	For service to community health, particularly through the Asthma Foundation of New South Wales	
Emeritus Professor Eric Vincent Mackay	For service to medicine, particularly in the fields of obstetrics and gynaecology	
Dr Francis Auchline Macnab	For service to religion and as founder of the Cairnmillar Institute	
Dr Jillian Mary Maling	For service to tertiary education	
Brother Stanislaus William McGuire	For service to religion and to international relations	
William Patrick McLennan	For public service	
Natascha Duschene McNamara, MBE	For service to the Aboriginal community, particularly through the Aboriginal Training and Cultural Institute	
Lesley Kaye McPaul	For service to education, particularly through the Federation of Parents' and Citizens' Associations	
John Stanley Raymond Meredith, OAM	For service to the arts, particularly in the collection and preservation of Australian folklore	
Dr Henry Kazimierz Millicer	For service to the aviation industry, particularly in the field of aeronautical engineering	
Clinical Associate Professor Paul Sydney Moffitt	For service to medicine particularly in the field of diabetic education	
Felicity Anne Morrish	For service to the education of children with intellectual disabilities	
Laurence Conway Muller	For service to the print media as a publisher and bookseller	
Margaret Anne Nielsen	For service to women's affairs	
Justin Maurice O'Brien	For service to art	
Nancy Ethel O'Donnell	For service to children with disabilities, particularly through the Girl Guides' Association	
Muriel Josephine Pagliano	For service to the community, particularly through the Country Women's Association	
Peter Joseph Patroni	For service to aviation, particularly through the Aircraft Owners' and Pilots' Association	
Dr Richard Graham Pembrey	For service to medicine, particularly in the fields of haematology and oncology	
Sister Therese Marie Pilkington (Sister Paulina)	For service to nursing education and to international relations	
Dr Richard Maxwell Porter	For service to community health	
Douglas Gideon Poulter	For public service	
Valmai Blanche Power	For service to the Aboriginal community	
Victor Albert Prosser	For service to business and commerce and to the accounting profession in Australia and internationally	
Albert Forwood Puddy, ED	For service to the community, particularly employer support for the Reserve Forces	
Robert Michael Radford	For service to cricket administration	
Joan Reidy	For service to education for disabled students	
Dennis John Rose, QC	For public service	
Richard Thomas Scott	For service to industrial relations	
Sheila Winifred Gordon Scotter, MBE	For service to the arts, particularly through fundraising	
Dr Barrie Pedder Scrivener	For service to medicine, particularly in the field of otolaryngology	
Berek Robert Segan, OBE	For service to the promotion and support of the arts, particularly through the Castlemaine State Festival	
Dr John Nathan Segelov	For service to medicine particularly in the field of neurosurgery	
Philippa Judith Smith	For service to the community, particularly through the formulation of social welfare policies	
Dr William Albert Snowdon	For service to veterinary science, particularly through the Australian Animal Health Laboratory	
Dr Bernard Felix Stone	For service to science and to scouting	
Dr William John McGregor Tegart	For service to science and technology	
Charles Edward Timothy Terrell	For service to international aid, relations and welfare	
Dr Richard Frederick Walker	For service to the promotion of literacy, particularly in developing countries	
Clive Langridge Ward	For service to the community	
Professor Donald Mathew Waters	For service to education, particularly through the Australian Maritime College	
Bruce Phillip Webb	For service to the mineral and energy industries	
Dudley Keith Wilde	For service to architecture	
Beverley Ann Wills	For service to the community, tourism and to local government	
Lady Lois Woodward	For service to the community, particularly through the Victorian Hospitals Association and the Royal Women's Hospital	
Vincent Yovich	For service to Australian rules football administration	

==== Military Division ====
Branch	Recipient	Citation	Notes
Navy	Commander Ralph Andrew Clements Macdonald	For service to the Royal Australian Navy, particularly as the Command Support Services Officer of Naval Support Command	
Navy	Lieutenant Commander Ian Lennert Wegener	For service through the development of an enhanced minesweeping capability	
Navy	Anthony Thomas Wilson, PSM RFD	For service to the Royal Australian Navy, particularly as Director General Reserves Navy	
Army	Major Diana Grace Bienkiewicz	For service to the Australian Army, particularly as Staff Officer to the Assistant Chief of the General Staff, Army Reserve	
Army	Colonel James Kenneth Campbell	For service to the Army in the field of material management	
Army	Colonel Adam John Fritsch	For service as Commandant Army Aviation Centre and Commander Darling Downs Military Area	
Army	Lieutenant Colonel Ian Campbell Gordon	For service as Commanding Officer of the 1st Signal Regiment and the Australian Contingent, United Nations Mission to the Referendum in Western Sahara	
Army	Brigadier Alan Hayllar Hodges	For service as Chief of Staff Training Command and Director General of Personnel Support – Army	
Army	Lieutenant Colonel Keith Howard Jobson	For service as Commanding Officer North West Mobile Force	
Army	Lieutenant Colonel Gordon Jones	For service to the Army in armoured regimental training and command appointments	
Army	Colonel Robert Allen Slater	For service as Commander 6th Engineer Group	
Air Force	Group Captain John William Cottrell Baker	For service to the Royal Australian Air Force as Director of Aircraft Engineering, Headquarters Logistics Command	
Air Force	Wing Commander Kenneth Neal Birrer	For service to the Royal Australian Air Force as Commanding Officer Base Squadron, East Sale	
Air Force	Wing Commander John Michael Fander-Linden, AFC	For service as Director of Air Operations for the Papua New Guinea Defence Force	
Air Force	Wing Commander John David Riches	For service as Staff Officer, Headquarters Operational Support Group	
Air Force	Wing Commander Noel Gilbert Schmidt	For service as Staff Officer Engineering Policy	

=== Medal (OAM) ===
==== General Division ====
Recipient	Citation	Notes
Shirley Elaine Adkins	For service to the Aero clubs, particularly as a competitor and administrator	
Hazel Jean Althofer	For service to the conservation and the environment, particularly through the Burrendong Arboretum Trust	
Graham Frank Andrews	For service to the community, particularly as administrator of the Western Queensland flood appeal 1990	
Isobel Mary Annat, MBE	For service to nursing and nursing organisations	
Anita Beryl Arnold	For service to children with intellectual disabilities	
Veda Joyce Arrowsmith	For service to the visual arts	
Monica-Ann Attard	For service to the community as radio correspondent, Moscow	
Frank Vincent Baden-Powell	For service to the performing arts	
Lady Edith Maud Badger	For service to the community, particularly through the Meals on Wheels organisation	
Colin Gordon Ball	For service to the public service	
Helen Lynnette Bates	For service to community, particularly people suffering from cancer	
Frederic Henry Bates	For service to the arts as an administrator and artist	
Joylene Maria Battilana	For service to the Public Service	
Valerie Chisholm Becher	For service to the community	
Victor Charles Bell	For service to the community and local government	
Ingrid Anne Berg	For service to the performing arts, to artists and to charities	
Jennifer Anne Bermingham	For service to the performing arts as an opera singer	
Kevin John Berry	For service to the sport of swimming	
Robena Heather Berry	For service to the aged	
Cecil Claud Bettens, BEM	For service to veterans	
Malcolm Robert Blaikie	For service to the community and primary industry	
Councillor Michael Winston Blyth	For service to local government	
Lester Joan Brandt	For service to the community as a musician	
Dorothy Eileen Brewer	For service to the sport of cricket	
Phyllis Anne Broadway	For service to the arts, particularly as manager of the Castlemaine State Festival	
Dr Peter Charles Brothers	For service to dentistry through the Australian Dental Association	
Joyce Alice Brown	For service to sport, particularly as a member of the 1991 Australian World Netball Squad	
Dorothy May Browne	For service to athletics	
Patricia Ann Brusasco	For service to the community	
Percy Alexander Buchanan	For service to the dairy industry	
Andrew Fergus Buckle	For service to youth, particularly through cricket	
James Frederick Burke	For service to veterans	
James William Burton	For service to education, particularly to environmental education	
Reginald Thomas Butler	For service to sports administration and to the community	
Graham Alexander Carlisle	For service to surf life saving	
Martin Dennis Carlson	For service to the community as a fundraiser, particularly for the Royal Children's Hospital Building Foundation	
Geoffrey Donald Carrington	For service to the sport of water skiing	
Olive Benita Cash	For service to the community through the National Trust	
Yvonne Kathleen Cato	For service to veterans	
Robert Edward Chadwick	For services to the wool industry	
Francis Charles Chattaway	For service to people with disabilities and to community organisations	
Robert Charles Clarke	For service to the Public Service	
Gladys Emily Coleman	For service to youth	
Lorraine Mavis Collopy	For service to community health, local government and community organisations	
Raymond Cook	For service to local history	
Wyndham Oliver Cooper	For service to the hearing impaired	
Douglas Harold Corben	For service to the community and to local government	
Robert Joseph Corbridge	For service to people with intellectual disabilities	
Montague Charles Carrington Cotton, DFC	For service to the timber and wood product industry	
Roger Maxwell Cowan	For service to the sport of rugby league football	
Charles William Crowden	For service to the community, particularly to the aged and veterans	
Sylvia Mary Curley	For service to nursing, to local history and to the National Trust	
Nanette Mary D'Arcy	For service to Vietnamese and Indo-Chinese migrants	
Brian Francis D'Arcy	For service to Vietnamese and Indo-Chinese migrants	
Carissa Leanne Dalwood	For service to sport, particularly as a member of the 1991 Australian World Netball Squad	
William Darnell	For service to the community and to tourism	
Brian John Davey	For service to physiotherapy	
Lester Lloyd Davies	For service to the Aboriginal community, particularly through the Aboriginal Legal Service of Western Australia	
Elsie Veronica De Luca-Virgona	For service to children with hearing and sight impairments, particularly through the Lantern Club	
Eleanor June Dean	For service to St Paul's Cathedral, Rockhampton	
Alan Geoffrey Dear	For service to the support of laryngectomy patients	
Keeley Jane Devery	For service to sport, particularly as a member of the 1991 Australian World Netball Squad	
Patrick Kelvin Dickens	For service to the community and local government	
Russell Keith Dickens	For service to animal welfare, particularly through the Australian Koala Foundation	
Ruth Edith Don	For service to the Association of Women's Forum Clubs	
Nanette Eleanor Dooley	For service to the community	
Francis Austin Doyle	For service to local history	
Frederick Morris Doyle	For service to veterans	
William Robert Drevesen, BEM	For service to sailing and to the community	
Lyn Jean Drysdale	For service to the Myalgic Encephalomyelitis Support Group	
Allen Edward Duggan	For service to veterans	
Mary Margaret Dun	For service to the community	
Eva Jean Dunlop	For service to the Cystic Fibrosis Association	
Sister Elizabeth Inez Dunsmore	For service to nursing, particularly hospice and palliative care	
Dr Douglas William Easthope	For service to dentistry and for voluntary service to the people of the Solomon Islands	
Brian Clifford Edwards	For service to physiotherpy and Legacy through a fundraising solo flight from England to Perth in a Tiger Moth	
Ronald George Edwards	For service to Australian folklore and to publishing through Ram Skull Press	
Isabel Elizabeth Elliott	For service to the community	
Laurel Margaret Elliott	For service to the community, particularly through the Melbourne Citizens Advice Bureau	
Ellen Ita English	For service to the community, particularly through the Catholic Women's League	
Robert George Natale Fabris	For service to the community	
Antonio Lauro Facciolo	For service to the tourism and hospitality industry	
Rosemary Ann Farrow	For service to the Victorian Council for Children's Films and Television	
Nick Vincent Fazzalari	For service to the Italian community, particularly through the Society of St Hilarion Inc	
Michelle Fielke	For service to sport, particularly as a member of the 1991 Australian World Netball Squad	
Sharon Louise Finnan	For service to sport, particularly as a member of the 1991 Australian World Netball Squad	
Matthew Felix Fitzgerald	For service to the community	
Sister Marlene Therese Fitzgibbons	For service to nursing	
Beatrice Helen Fitzsimons	For service to the community, particularly the Country Woman's Association	
Dr Robert John Fleming	For service to medicine and to the community	
George Freuden	For service to the sport of skiing, particularly through the Ski Patrol Association	
Harry Cecil Gadd	For service to veterans	
Eric Heinrich Giersch DFC	For service to the Travellers' Cot Fund	
Christopher John Gilbey	For service to the Australian music industry and to the Paraplegic and Quadriplegic Association	
Frank Edward Gill	For service to veterans	
Arthur Dingwall Gorrie	For service to Toastmasters International and to Queensland Model Aero Club	
John Macmillan Govan	For service to veterans	
Violet Winifred Lily Grant	For service to veterans and to the community	
Dr McCrae Cramond Grassie	For service to education	
Keith Graver	For service to the Pharmacy Guild of Australia	
Marjory Ann Graves	For service to equestrian sports	
Margery Adela Guiver	For service to education and to the Quota Club	
Joy Ellen Rose Gullan	For service to people with hearing impairments and to the community	
Timothy Douglas Haining	For service to people with disabilities through the Blairlogie Centre	
Geoffrey Philip Harris	For service to the print media and to the Printing and Allied Trades Employers' Federation	
Marjorie Winsome Hart	For service to the community	
Dr Malcolm Cave Hay	For service to youth, particularly through the Sail Training Scheme	
Keith Whitten Hayward	For service to veterans, particularly through the Totally and Permanently Disabled Soldiers Association	
Janice Eileen Heaslip	For service to the education of children in isolated areas	
Donald Harold Heggie	For service to the community	
Margaret Janet Hendry	For service to women's affairs	
Eckart Wolfgang Hill	For service to the promotion of multiculturalism in the arts	
Ada Hinde	For service to the community particularly through fundraising for the Walter and Eliza Hall Institute of Medical Research	
Neoklis Hodge	For service to the Greek community	
Barbara Joan Horsfield	For service to the Girl Guides Association	
Daniel Paul Hoyland	For service to surf lifesaving	
David Hamilton Hume	For service to community health, particularly through the Anti-Cancer Council of Victoria	
Lola Anne Hutchinson	For service to the community and to local government	
Johanna Clasina Maria Huygens	For service to youth with disabilities, particularly through the Girl Guides Association	
Keith Ison	For service to secondary school education	
Roselee Joy Gwendoline Jencke	For service to sport, particularly as a member of the 1991 Australian World Netball Squad	
Colin Raymond Johns	For service to the Pharmacy Guild of Australia	
Jill Dorine Johnstone	For service to the Girl Guides Association	
Arthur Charles Jordan	For service to veterans	
Verlie Just	For service to the arts, particularly as director of the Town Gallery, Brisbane	
Sylvia Dawn Kearney	For service to the community	
Percival 'Ned' Kelly	For service to veterans	
Jennifer Anne Kennett	For service to sport, particularly as a member of the 1991 Australian World Netball Squad	
Susan Carolyn Kenny	For service to sport, particularly as a member of the 1991 Australian World Netball Squad	
Valerie Elizabeth (Bette) Kingsford-Smith	For service to the National Trust	
Jenny Millar Lamond	For service to education, particularly through the development of the "Lamond Method" of learning, spelling and reading	
John Charlesworth Langley	For service to the community	
Josephine Mary Lannan	For service to nursing	
(Raymond) Douglas Lawrence	For service to music, particularly as an organist and choir director	
Dr Elijah Haim Levy	For service to the Jewish community and to medicine	
Edwin Alfred Lewis	For service to scouting and to the community	
Lynette Margaret Lillecrapp	For service to swimming, particularly as a gold medallist at the Toke Mandeville World Wheelchair Championships	
Valentine Sheila Littler	For service to people with intellectual disabilities, particularly through the Endeavour Foundation	
Dr Aldo Lorigiola	For service to the Italian community and to the promotion of Australia in Italy	
Joseph Noble Madeley	For service to veterans, particularly through the Rats of Tobruk Association	
Dulcie May Magnus	For service to people with visual impairments, particularly through the transcribing of written music into Braille	
Iris Laura Maguire	For service to the community, particularly through charitable organisations	
Geoffrey Dene Mann	For service to youth, particularly through the Sea Scouts	
Ian Otto Maroske	For service to conservation and to community history	
Robert Leonard Davis Marshall	For service to the performing arts, particularly through the Gallery First Nighters	
Olive Rosalind Morton Mason	For service to the community and to assisting the families of overseas service personnel training at the Command and Staff College, Fort Queenscliff	
Erica Margaret McGilchrist	For service to contemporary art and to the establishment of the Women's Art Register	
Simone Cecile McKinnis	For service to sport, particularly as a member of the 1991 Australian World Netball Squad	
John Francis McNamara	For service to sport administration	
Ronald Andrew McNeill	For service to the community	
Kenneth John Mead	For service to the community	
Margaret Joan Mead	For service to nursing, particularly through caring for people with burn injuries	
Marilyn Lilla Grace Melhuish	For service to sport, particularly as a member of the 1991 Australian World Netball Squad	
Morton John Menz	For service to the community	
Gwynneth Noreen Miall	For service to the community, particularly through the League of Home Help	
Keith Middleton	For service to the aged	
Marjorie Minnis	For service to nursing, particularly midwifery	
Alderman Robert Moore	For service to local government	
Anne Moutafis	For service to business education	
Envoy Andrew Peter Murfin	For service to social welfare, particularly through the Salvation Army	
Peter John Murray	For service to mining and to the community	
Terry Muscat	For service to trade unions and to the Maltese community	
Shirley Nelson	For service to nursing	
Hilda Thompson Newstead	For service to the community	
Shelley Maree O'Donnell	For service to sport, particularly as a member of the 1991 Australian World Netball Squad	
Margaret Ellen O'Neill	For service to the aged	
Frances Thelma Oates	For service to community welfare groups	
Jack Colvin Olsson	For service to the community, particularly through Rotary International	
Teresa Mary Omond	For service to community health	
Wendy Page	For service to community health, particularly in the area of palliative care	
Graeme Ian Parkinson	For service to Modbury Hospital	
Anthony David Parsons	For service to the breeding, working and judging of the Australian kelpie sheepdog	
Joseph Perillo	For service to the Italian community	
David Austin Phippard	For service to the Sydney Maritime Museum	
Geoffrey Leonard Plant	For service to people with hearing impairments	
Jack Ernest Pollard	For service to sports journalism and sporting history	
Joyce Ada Purcell	For service to women's affairs, particularly through the Catholic Women's League	
Jessie Catherine Quigley	For service to the community	
Trevor Gilbert Quinn	For service to the community	
Jack Weston Rae	For service to primary industry, particularly the Royal Agricultural Society of Victoria	
John Albert Randall	For service to local government	
Elwhyn Gledhill Randell	For service to the community	
Henry James Rankine	For service to the Aboriginal community	
Ralph Iro Raymond	For service to the community through music	
John Oswald Reynolds	For service to mining	
Judith Ann Rice	For service to local government and to the community	
Charles Henry Richardson	For service to sports journalism	
Francis Leslie Rigney	For service to local government and to the community	
Rodney John Riley	For service as a greenkeeper and to the development of Greenless Park couch grass	
Mary Therese Rimoldi	For service to the community, particularly the fostering of disabled children	
The Reverend George Rosendale	For service to the Lutheran Church and to the Aboriginal community	
John Nigel Ross	For service to local government and to the community	
Marjorie Mary Ross	For service to the community	
Margaret Ann Sands	For service to Riding for the Disabled	
William Neville Scott	For service to Australian folklore	
Albert Ernest Shade	For service to the community through music organisations	
Frank Slattery	For service to orchid growing	
John Wasley Smith	For service to medicine	
Dora May Smith	For service to the Totally and Permanently Disabled Soldiers' Association Queensland Branch	
Stuart Alexander Somerville	For service to swimming administration and to the community	
John Mervyn Stanaway	For service to journalism	
Dr John Mackay Stanhope	For service to medicine, particularly in alcohol and drug related areas	
Vladas Statnickas	For service to the Lithuanian community	
Nell Steele	For service to the community, particularly the Save the Children Fund	
Dr Noel Lavender Stephenson	For service to the community, particularly the Berwick Hospital Committee	
Alderman Margaret Elizabeth Stevenson	For service to local government and to the community	
Marie Joan Stillman	For service to the community	
Allan Gregory Stormon	For service to the community	
John Henry Styring	For service to horse racing, particularly as a race caller, broadcaster and journalist	
Jeanette Eunice Suttie	For service to the community	
The Reverend Peter Tapau	For service to the community	
Neville Aubrey Thomas	For service to music education and related organisations	
Nancy Thompson	For service to the Yooralla Society of Victoria	
Noel David Thompson	For service to the Limbless Soldiers' Association of Tasmania	
Phyllis Jean Thomson	For service to lawn bowls	
Dr John William Trace	For service to local government and to the community	
Joyce Trickett	For service to the arts, particularly poetry and short story writing	
Douglas James Trottman	For service to brass band music	
Dr Peter Brett Tunbridge	For service to the Western Australian Society for Crippled Children	
Lysbeth Turnbull	For service to the Girl Guides Association and to the community	
Laura Elizabeth Turnbull	For service to the community, particularly through the Zipper Club	
Victor Norman Waddell	For service to scouting	
Catriona Margaret Wagg	For service to sport, particularly as a member of the 1991 Australian World Netball Squad	
Ross Leslie Walker, MBE	For service to the community, particularly aged people	
Bruce Laurence Webster	For service to media broadcasting and to increasing the Australian public's understanding of parliamentary processes	
Charles Dudley Wehlow	For service to local government	
John Cecil Weldon	For service to the community	
Patricia June Wetzler	For service to the Newcastle War Widows' Guild	
Milton Stanley Whiting	For service to the community	
Edward James Whitten	For service to Australian rules football	
Henry Samuel Whittington	For service to soil and land conservation	
Margaret Annie Wilkinson	For service to the St John Ambulance and to the community	
Lucy Wilkinson	For service to Red Cross and to the community	
Dr Maurice Cornelius Williams	For service to medicine and to the Queensland Spastic Welfare League	
Vicki Susan Wilson	For service to sport, particularly as a member of the 1991 Australian World Netball Squad	
Leslie Winkle	For service to secondary education in Queensland	
Norman Ralph Wright	For service to youth and to the community	
Alexander Zotos	For service to the State Emergency Service, particularly the Parramatta Unit	

==== Military Division ====
Branch	Recipient	Citation	Notes
Navy	Chief Petty Officer Raymon John Cooper	For service to the Royal Australian Navy, particularly as the Supply Department Regulating Chief Petty Officer, HMAS Tobruk	
Navy	Warrant Officer Terrence James Hill	For service, particularly in the field of sport and the development of the Royal Australian Navy physical training display team	
Navy	Chief Petty Officer Wayne John Richards	For service, particularly to Naval Training at HMAS Nirimba	
Navy	Warrant Officer John Michael Southon	For service, particularly as a Navy Career Adviser	
Army	Warrant Officer Class One Ian Robert Angow	For service to the Army in the field of equipment maintenance management	
Army	Sergeant Gary Kevin Durrant	For service to the Australian Army in the field of ballistic photography	
Army	Sergeant Rebecca Frances Gray	For service to the Army in the field of administration	
Army	Warrant Officer Class One Stephen Griffiths	For service as the Regimental Sergeant Major 2nd/17th Battalion, The Royal New South Wales Regiment	
Army	Captain Gregory Reginald Hansen	For service as the Regimental Sergeant Major of the Royal Military College Duntroon	
Army	Captain Peter Leeman	For service to the Army in the field of air defence	
Army	Warrant Officer Class One Lawrence James O'Sullivan	For service as the Regimental Sergeant Major 16th Battalion The Royal Western Australia Regiment	
Army	Warrant Officer Class One Ian Maurice Pressley	For service as a Company Sergeant Major with Headquarters 1st Division	
Army	Warrant Officer Class Two David Francis Quinn	For service with the Special Air Service Regiment	
Army	Warrant Officer Class One Peter John Semczuk	For service to the Army in the field of communications technical training	
Army	Corporal Wayne John Williams	For service as a Recruit Instructor at the 1st Recruit Training Battalion, Kapooka	
Air Force	Warrant Officer Thomas Sidney Hobday	For service as Warrant Officer Engineer, Boeing 707 flight line operations, No 486 Squadron	
Air Force	Flight Sergeant Maxwell Roderick Chambers	For services to the Royal Australian Air Force at Recruiting Sydney	
Air Force	Warrant Officer Stewart Clay Freeman	For service as Provisioning Supervisor, Headquarters Logistics Command	
Air Force	Sergeant John Charles Hall	For service as Non-Commissioned Officer-in-Charge Maintenance Control Section 5th Aviation Regiment	
Air Force	Warrant Officer James David McClellan	For service as caterer, Base Squadron Tindal	
Air Force	Warrant Officer Paul Wayne Saunders	For service to the Royal Australian Air Force in the implementation of the Corporals' Promotion Course at Headquarters Training Command Support Unit	
Air Force	Warrant Officer Russell Graham Thomson	For service in support of the Defence Suggestion Scheme and the Central Welfare Trust Fund and as the Sponsor of Clerk Financial Accounts Mustering	
