= Kathy Hirschfeld =

Australian business executive and engineer

Kathy Hirschfeld AM FTSE
- Born: Katherine Anne Hirschfeld; Brisbane, Queensland, Australia
- Education: University of Queensland
- Relatives: Otto Hirschfeld, grandfather; Eugen Hirschfeld, great-grandfather

Katherine Anne Hirschfeld is an Australian chemical engineer and business executive.

== Early life and education ==
Hirschfeld was born in Brisbane, Queensland. She was educated at Ascot State School and then Brisbane Girls Grammar School. She completed a Bachelor of Chemical Engineering at the University of Queensland in 1982.

== Career ==
On graduation, Hirschfeld joined BP and during a 20-year career worked for them in Australia, Turkey and the United Kingdom. She was managing director of BP's Bulwer Island Refinery from 2005 to 2010.

She has been a member of the Senate of the University of Queensland since 2010, following in the footsteps of her grandfather, Otto Hirschfeld (1953–1957) and great-grandfather Eugen Hirschfeld (1910–1914).

Hirschfeld joined the board of Powerlink Queensland in 2018 as chair and was appointed to the board of Central Petroleum Limited in the same year.

== Awards and recognition ==
Hirschfeld was elected a fellow of the Institution of Chemical Engineers in 2005 and of the Australian Academy of Technology and Engineering in 2009. She has been an honorary fellow of Engineers Australia since 2014. In 2015 she was named one of the Top 25 Most Influential Female Engineers by Engineers Australia and also one of the AFR/Westpac 100 Women of Influence. She was appointed a Member of the Order of Australia in the 2019 Queen's Birthday Honours for "significant service to engineering, to women, and to business".
