= Mary Mahoney =

Mary Mahoney may refer to:

- Mary Eliza Mahoney (1845–1926), first African American to study and work as a professionally trained nurse in the United States
- Mary Mahoney (physician) (1940–2021), Australian medical practitioner
