= Elizabeth Powell =

Elizabeth Powell may refer to:

- Elizabeth Powell (colonist) (fl. 1836), early settler of Texas
- Elizabeth Powell (poet), American poet
- Elizabeth Powell (scientist), Australian scientist
- Elizabeth Powell (writer), Australian journalist and children's writer
- Elizabeth Dilys Powell (1901–1995), English journalist
- Elizabeth Powell, lead singer and guitarist of the band Land of Talk
- Elizabeth Powell Bond (1841–1926), American educator

== See also ==
- Elizabeth Willing Powel (1743–1830), American socialite
