= Marks-Hirschfeld Museum of Medical History =

Museum of medical history

Coordinates: 27.4482°S 153.0238°E

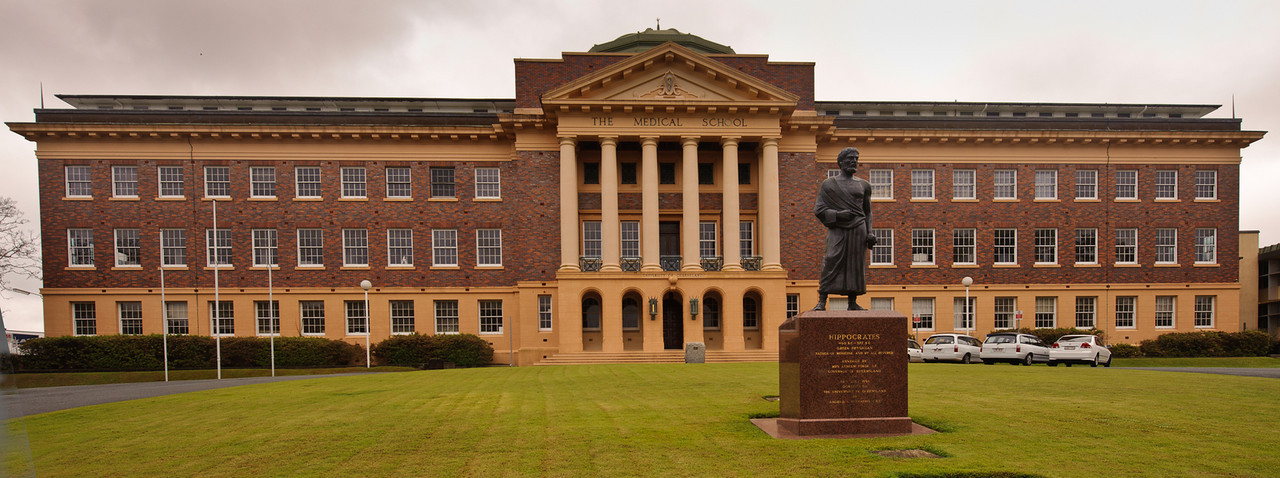
The museum is located within the Mayne Medical School.

The Marks-Hirschfeld Museum of Medical History is a museum at the University of Queensland Mayne Medical School at 288 Herston Road, Herston, City of Brisbane, Queensland, Australia. Operated by volunteers and supported by the University of Queensland Alumni, it has a collection of over 7,000 items of medical memorabilia, medical and surgical instruments. The focus is on the study of medical history in Queensland, but the collection includes items with broader significance to Australia and internationally.

== History ==
The museum was established 1950 with donations of material from Dr Alexander Hammett Marks and Dr John Hardie from the collection of his father Sir David Hardie, Queensland’s first medical knight. In 1980, the museum was renamed Marks-Hirschfeld Museum of Medical History, honouring a number of generations of the Marks family who have contributed to the collection and Dr Konrad Hirschfeld (son of Eugen Hirschfeld), who was the museum's curator for more than 20 years.
