= Thomas Parnell =

Thomas Parnell may refer to:

- Thomas Parnell (scientist)
- Thomas Parnell (poet)

== See also ==
- J. Parnell Thomas, American stockbroker and politician
