= Braemar Power Station =

Power station complex in Queensland, Australia

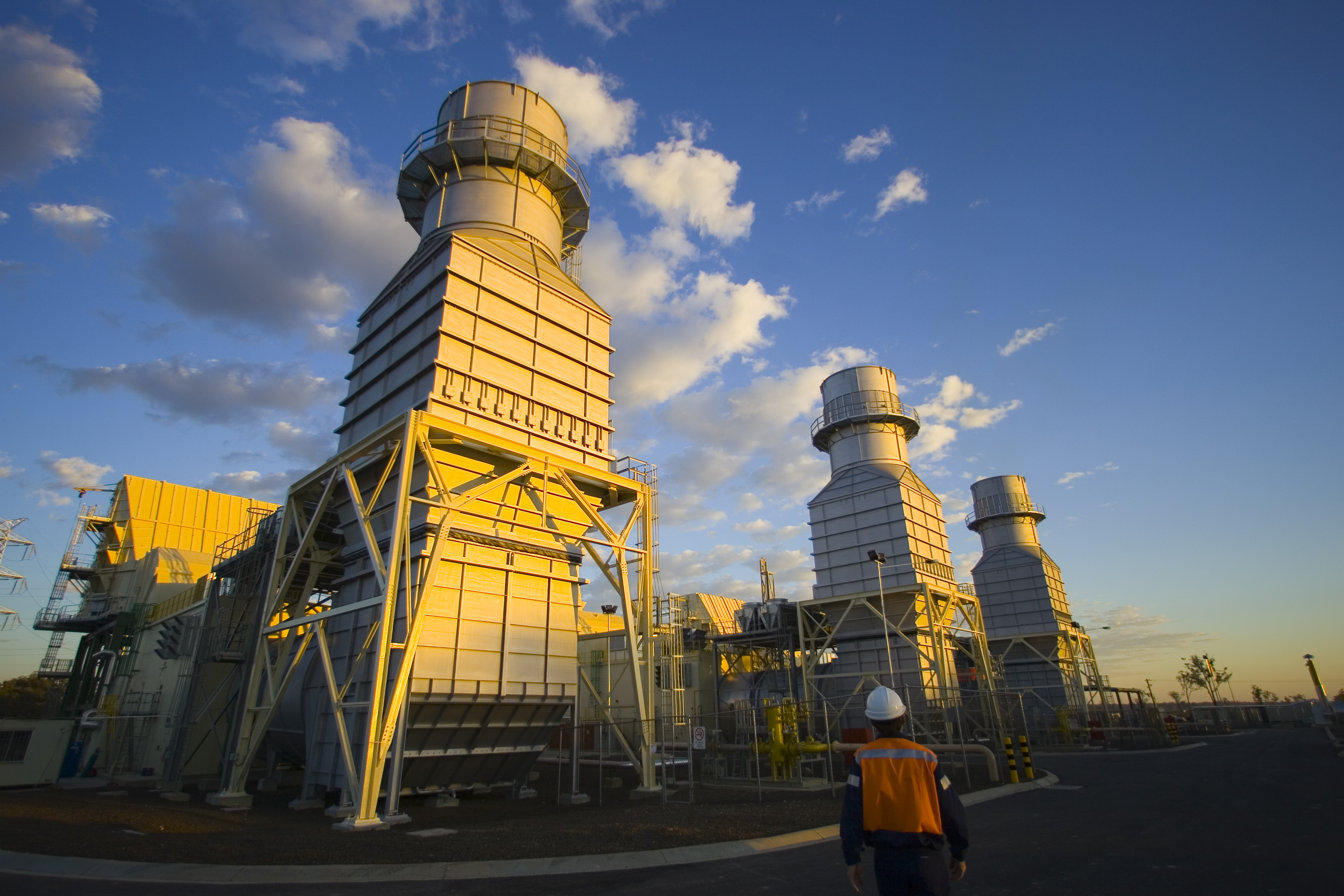
- Braemar 2 Power Station
- Country: Australia
- Location: Kogan, Western Downs Region, Queensland
- Coordinates: 27°6′36″S 150°54′18″E
- Status: Operational
- Commission date: 2006 (Braemar-1); 2009 (Braemar-2)
- Owners: Alinta Energy (Braemar-1); Arrow Energy (Braemar-2)

Thermal power station
- Primary fuel: Coal seam gas

Power generation
- Units operational: 3 X 150 MW (Braemar-1); 3 X 150 MW (Braemar-2)
- Make and model: Alstom (Braemar-1); Siemens (Braemar-2)
- Nameplate capacity: 502 MW (Braemar-1); 450 MW (Braemar-2)

Braemar Power Station is a complex of natural gas and coal seam gas fired combined-cycle power stations in Kogan, Western Downs Region, Queensland, Australia. It is near Dalby in the Darling Downs region.

== Braemar-1 ==
Braemar-1 is a 564 MW open-cycle natural gas turbine plant located 35 kilometres (22 mi) south west of Dalby, adjacent to the Kogan Creek Power Station, Queensland – New South Wales high voltage transmission interconnector and Powerlink 320/274 kV substation. It is supplied from the Tipton West coal seam gas fields, with the 150-kilometre (93 mi) pipeline between Condamine and Braemar, which is used exclusively to supply the Braemar Power Station.

The power station was developed by ERM Power and was built by Alstom. It is equipped by three Alstom's 150 MW GT13E2 gas turbines. The power station cost A$545 million. It was completed in 2006 and is anticipated to operate until 2036. ERM Power sold the plant to Alinta Energy in 2008.

== Braemar-2 ==
Braemar-2 is a 450 MW open-cycle natural gas turbine plant adjacent to the Braemar-1 power station. The power station was developed by ERM Power and was built by Bilfinger. It supplies peak demand power and it is equipped by three Siemens's 150 MW SGT5-2000E gas turbines. The power station cost A$546 million. Gas for this power station is sourced from the Stratheden field at Daandine.

Braemar-2 began operating on 12 June 2009 and was officially opened on 25 August 2009. It is Queensland's second-largest gas-fired power station. Arrow Energy acquired 50% of the station in 2008 and on 4 July 2011, it took full control of Braemar-2.

== Braemar-3 ==
Braemer 3 is a planned 550 MW power station adjacent to the existing stations. It was expected to be operational by 2015 and forecast to cost $530 million to build. However the rapid increase in household solar generation has reduced the electricity demand on the grid, consequently the Braemar-3 unit was not profitable and has not been developed.

The recent construction of lower cost Darling Downs Solar Farm and Coopers Gap Wind Farm nearby suggests Breamar-3 is unlikely to be ever built.

== Braemar-4 ==
ERM Power is considering the development of Braemer 4, indicating it will proceed with its development when market conditions improve. As with Braemar 3, the rapid increase in renewable electricity generation has meant that Braemar 4 is uneconomic.

== See also ==
- List of power stations in Queensland
