= Queensland – New South Wales Interconnector =

Location
- Country: Australia
- State: New South Wales; Queensland
- General direction: south–north–south
- From: Armidale
- Passes through: Dumaresq Switching Station; Bulli Creek; Braemar
- To: Tarong

Ownership information
- Operator: TransGrid; Powerlink Queensland

Construction information
- Commissioned: 2001

Technical information
- Current type: AC
- Capacity: 700 MW (NSW to Queensland); 1,200 MW (Queensland to NSW)
- AC voltage: 330 kV (Armidale–Dumaresq–Bulli Creek–Braemar); 275 kV (Braemar–Tarong)
- No. of circuits: 2

The Queensland – New South Wales Interconnector (QNI) is a 330 kV AC interconnection between New South Wales and Queensland, Australia. The link was commissioned in 2001. It consisted of double-circuit 330 kV lines between Armidale, Dumaresq Substation, Bulli Creek and Braemar and a double-circuit 275 kV line between Braemar and Tarong.There is an additional 330 kV Dual Circuit to complement the QNI from Bulli Ck Switching Station (27°55'15.8"S 150°50'34.8"E) via Millmerran Power Station & Switching Stations (27°57'53.7"S 151°16'26.9"E) to Middle Ridge Switching Station & 330/275/110 kV Sub, South of Toowoomba (27°37'22.2"S 151°56'43.0"E). The Dumaresq Switching Station (29° 12' 12"S 151° 19' 44"E) is in a rural area along Bruxner Way on the New South Wales side of the border with Queensland, and is located 21 km south-east of Bonshaw. The original maximum transfer capacity was 300 to 350 MW in both directions. This has been progressively increased to 700 MW from New South Wales to Queensland and 1,200 MW from Queensland to New South Wales.The interconnector is operated by TransGrid and Powerlink Queensland.
