= Konrad Hirschfeld =

Australian surgeon (b. 1904, d. 1987)

Franz Konrad Saddler Hirschfeld CBE (1904–1987) was an Australian medical practitioner and surgeon. He pioneered thoracic surgeries in Australia. He became a university academic, administrator and medical historian.

After obtaining his medical degree, he worked at various hospitals in the UK before returning to Australia in 1938. Hirschfeld specialized in thoracic surgery and conducted the first successful pneumonectomy and oesophagectomy surgeries in Queensland. He also served in the Australian Imperial Force during World War II. Hirschfeld was a dedicated medical historian, curating the Royal Brisbane Hospital's medical museum and serving in various teaching roles at the University of Queensland. He was appointed a Commander of the Order of the British Empire (CBE) in the 1978 Birthday Honours, for "services to the medical profession". Hirschfeld died in 1987, and the Marks-Hirschfeld Medical History Museum at the Royal Brisbane Hospital is named in his honor.

== Early life ==
Franz Konrad Saddler Hirschfeld was born on 26 April 1904 in Brisbane, Queensland, the son of Dr Eugen Hirschfeld, a Prussian physician and Consul to Brisbane, and his Australian wife Annie. Konrad attended the Brisbane Normal School and Brisbane Grammar School. He won a scholarship to attend the University of Queensland completing his first year of a science degree with the intention of pursuing medicine like his father Eugen Hirschfeld and brother Otto Hirschfeld in 1924. He moved to Melbourne and entered Trinity College in 1925 while studying medicine at the University of Melbourne, where he obtained first class honours in anatomy in 1926. Hirschfeld was awarded a Rhodes Scholarship in 1927. He studied at the London Hospital, and graduated in 1930 with first class honours in physiology and the Gotch Memorial Prize.

== Medical career ==
Hirschfeld was appointed house surgeon in 1931 at the London Hospital and obtained his FRCS in 1932. He went on to be surgical registrar and first assistant at the London. He worked with colleagues Henry Souttar, James Walton and Hugh Cairns. He subsequently worked at the Brompton Hospital with Tudor Edwards and Price Thomas for almost two years. Hirschfeld returned to Australia and was appointed junior surgeon to the Royal Brisbane Hospital in 1938. His special interest was thoracic surgery and he continued as surgeon in this specialisation until his retirement in 1964. He married Brigid Cooney from Ireland in 1939.

== War service ==
Hirschfeld served as specialist in the Australian Imperial Force (AIF) between 1941 and 1946.

== Later career ==
Hirschfeld conducted the first successful pneumonectomy and oesophagectomy surgeries in Queensland. Hirschfeld was honoured with a Master of Arts from the University of Queensland in 1965 and a doctorate of surgery in 1982. He was active member of the University of Queensland serving in teaching roles. He was a dedicated medical historian and curated the Royal Brisbane Hospital's medical museum which collected many old surgical instruments and other medical equipment. He was interested in military footwear and was the official advisor of the Pacific Island Regiment from 1958 to 1962 on this topic. He was on the University of Queensland Senate from 1966 to 1986.

== Memberships and awards ==
Life Governor of the Australian Postgraduate Medical Federation

Fellow – Australian Medical Association

Commander of the Order of the British Empire (1978)

== Legacy ==
Hirschfeld died on 10 March 1987. His daughter Mary Mahoney AO (née Hirschfeld) also pursued medicine. His daughter Roisin Goss (née Hirschfeld), was wife of Queensland's 34th Premier, Wayne Goss.

The Marks-Hirschfeld Medical History Museum at the Royal Brisbane Hospital is named in his honour.
