= Powerlink Queensland =

- Type: Government-owned corporation
- Industry: Energy
- Predecessor: Queensland Electricity Commission
- Founded: 1995
- Headquarters: 33 Harold Street, Virginia, Brisbane, Australia
- Area served: Queensland
- Key people: Paul Simshauser CEO; Kathy Hirschfeld Chair
- Services: Electricity transmission
- Operating income: $403.1m (2018/19)
- Net income: $114.0m (2018/19)
- Owner: Government of Queensland
- Website: Official website

Powerlink Queensland, the trading name of Queensland Electricity Transmission Corporation Limited, is a transmission system operator owned by the Queensland Government which operates high-voltage electricity transmission infrastructure throughout Queensland, Australia.

== History ==
Powerlink Queensland was created in 1995 after the corporatisation and restructure of the vertically integrated Queensland power industry. It was established under the Government Owned Corporation Act 1993 and is a registered public company under the Corporations Act 2001.

== Operations ==
Powerlink is a Transmission Network Service Provider (TNSP) within the Australian National Electricity Market (NEM). It does not buy or sell electricity; instead it transports it between participants within the NEM. Powerlink is a regulated monopoly business, with revenues set by the Australian Energy Regulator.

The transmission network, operated by Powerlink Queensland, extends 1,700 kilometres (1,100 mi) from north of Cairns to the New South Wales border, and comprises 15,000 kilometres (9,300 mi) of transmission lines and 152 substations.

Powerlink's network connects to New South Wales via the Queensland – New South Wales Interconnector (QNI). It also has a DC connection to NSW via the smaller Terranora interconnector. Powerlink is a member of Grid Australia which represents the owners of Australia's electricity transmission networks in the National Electricity Market and Western Australia. It has been appointed by the Queensland State Government as the jurisdictional planning body for Queensland to assess the capability of Queensland's transmission network to meet forecast electricity load growth.

Powerlink has adopted live high voltage substation maintenance practices on voltages up to 330 kV and is currently the only transmission utility in Australia to use these techniques. Its laboratory provides specialist testing and diagnostic services.
