= School of Mathematics and Physics =

School in Brisbane, Australia

The School of Mathematics and Physics (SMP) is in the Faculty of Science at The University of Queensland in Brisbane, Australia.

== History ==
Mathematics and Physics was a foundation department of The University of Queensland when it opened in 1911. Professor Henry James Priestley was the foundation Professor of Mathematics and Physics. In 1922 the departments separated and Professor Thomas Parnell became head of physics. The two departments were joined again in 2000, along with Earth Sciences, as the School of Physical Sciences until Earth Sciences was moved out of the school in 2009 when it was renamed as Mathematics and Physics.

The school occupies several buildings on the St Lucia campus including Parnell Building on the Great Court, the Physics Annex and Priestley Building.

== Research ==
The school has a long and successful history of research. Its most famous experiment is Parnell's Pitch Drop Experiment which is the third longest running scientific experiment in the world. The school has achieved international standing in research areas including applied mathematics (particularly in biological sciences), quantum computing, quantum atom optics, engineered quantum systems, astrophysics and soft condensed matter physics.

The school is one of the strongest performing research schools in the country with a number of high-profile researchers and centres. Recent research successes include:

== Australian Research Council Centres of Excellence ==
- Australian Centre for Quantum Atom Optics (ACQAO)
- Centre for Engineered Quantum Systems (EQUS)
- Centre for Future Low-Energy Electronics Technologies (FLEET)
- Centre for Mathematics and Statistics of Complex Systems (MASCOS)
- Centre for Quantum Biotechnology (QUBIC)
- Centre for Quantum Computing and Communication Technology (CQCCT) previously known as Centre for Quantum Computer Technology (CQCT)

== Australian Research Council Federation Fellows ==
- Professor Kevin Burrage (mathematics)
- Professor Gerard Milburn (physics)
- Professor Michael Nielsen (physics)
- Professor Hugh Possingham (mathematics)
- Professor Guifre Vidal (physics)
- Professor Andrew White (physics)

== Teaching ==
Teaching staff from the School of Mathematics and Physics regularly win national teaching awards and grants. Recent winners include:

- Professor Peter Adams (mathematics)
- Mr Michael Jennings (mathematics)
- Dr Margaret Wegener (physics)

== Outreach ==
The school has an active outreach program including the highly popular science lecture series BrisScience, physics and mathematics colloquia series, the demo troupe (undergraduate students perform physics shows aimed at high school students and general audiences) and the Physics Museum curated by Professor Norman Heckenberg.

The demo troupe regularly performs at schools around Brisbane and also travels to regional and remote Queensland to promote science.

== Alumni ==
The school has an active alumni network and holds several alumni reunion events each year.

== Senior School Staff ==
- Professor Halina Rubinsztein-Dunlop, Head of School
- Professor Joe Grotowski, Head of Mathematics
- Professor Michael Drinkwater, Head of Physics
- Mr Chris Shannon, School Manager
