= Margaret Hendry =

Australian landscape architect (1930–2001)

- Margaret Hendry
- Born: 11 May 1930
- Died: 20 March 2001 (aged 70)

Margaret Hendry (11 May 1930 – 20 March 2001) was an Australian landscape architect, one of the first women to work in this field in Australia. She worked for the National Capital Development Commission in Canberra from 1963 to 1974 and later lectured at the Canberra College of Advanced Education (now the University of Canberra).

== Achievement and honours ==
She graduated from Burnley Horticultural College in 1948, which was very unusual for a woman at that time. She then completed a diploma in landscape design at the Kings College, Durham University in the late 1950s.

She worked for Basildon Development Corporation for 'almost four years' before returning to Australia in 1961. In 1962 she undertook work for the Housing Commission of Victoria, producing landscaping treatment for the Coppin St. Estate of "Low Rental Units" in Richmond. Between 1963 and 1974 she was employed by the National Capital Development Commission to work on the landscape development of Canberra.

Hendry presented a paper at the Australian Garden Historical Society conference in the mid-1990s on the landscape development for the parliamentary area.

In 1992, she was awarded the Medal of the Order of Australia for her service to women's affairs.

== Legacy ==
An annual lecture on landscape architecture called "The Margaret Hendry Public Lecture" is hosted by the Australian Institute of Landscape Architects.

Hendry was a member of the Women's Advisory Board to the NSW Government and under Premiers Lewis & Wran she worked hard to improve the status and dignity of women and lobbied for many issues from equal pay for women to equal legal rights for step-children

In 2021, Hendry's niece Janine Hendry founded the 2021 March 4 Justice. Janine Hendry has stated that she was inspired by her Aunt's legacy in improving equality for women as a reason she founded the Women's March 4 Justice.

Margaret Hendry School, a primary school in the suburb on Taylor, opened in 2019 and is named in her honour.

In 1997, Hendry was appointed to the Australian Capital Territory Heritage Council.
