= Hermiene Ulrich =

Australian academic (1885–1956)

Hermiene Friederica Ulrich (1885–1956) was the first female lecturer at the University of Queensland in Brisbane, Queensland, Australia. She played a central role in shaping the early teaching and curriculum of the University of Queensland.

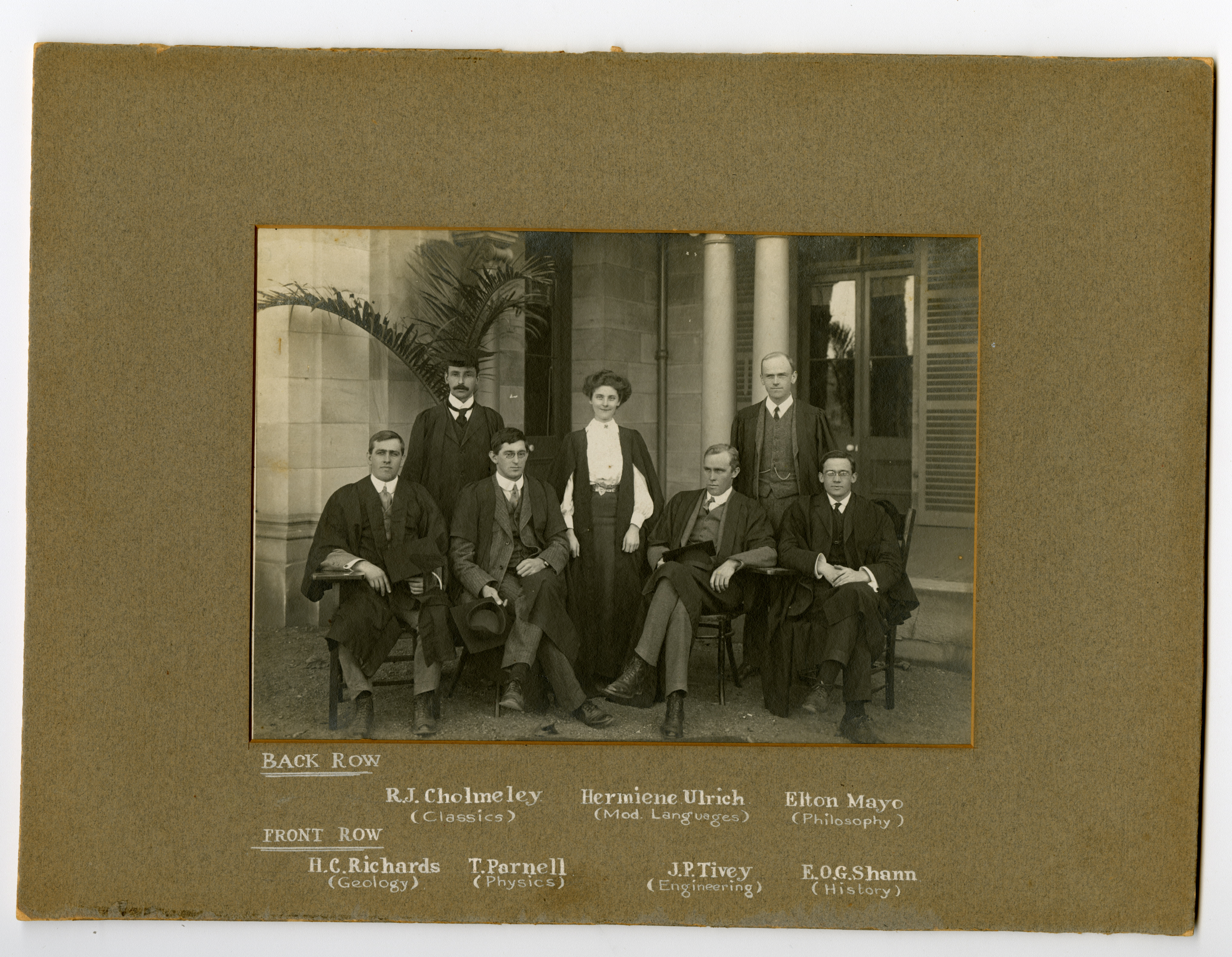
University of Queensland's first lecturers showing from back RJ Cholmeley (Classics), Hermiene Ulrich (Mod Languages), Elton Mayo (Philosophy), Front HC Richards (Geology), T Parnell (Physics) JP Tivey (Engineering), EOG Shann (History), Brisbane. Photograph used with the permission of the University of Queensland, Fryer Library

== Early life ==
Hermiene Ulrich (later Hermiene Parnell after her marriage) was born in 1885 in Victoria, Australia to German and Irish parents, and was raised around Ararat. Her family moved to Melbourne so that she and her siblings could attend school. Ulrich attended the Presbyterian Ladies' College. Ulrich went on to study at the University of Melbourne from 1906 to 1910. She took her B.A. with first class honours in the modern languages in 1909, and then went on to study her M.A. completing this in 1911. She undertook a Dip. Ed in 1913, winning three scholarships over the course of these studies.

== Career ==
Ulrich applied for a lecturer's position at the newly formed University of Queensland in 1911. She was hired as an Assistant Lecturer, the first woman to be employed as a lecturer at the university. Possibly reflecting the attitudes of the era to women in higher education, she was not upgraded to a full lecturer despite creating the curriculum for the first intake of Arts students in English, French and German. She was to be unofficial head of the department, until the appointment of Professor Jeremiah Joseph Stable.

Ulrich married Thomas Parnell, a fellow University of Melbourne graduate, who had also been appointed to a lecturing position at the University of Queensland in 1913. Women were not permitted to work after marriage at this point in time, but Mrs Parnell was granted teaching positions in 1913 and 1915–1918, as male members of staff began to enlist in World War I. At the conclusion of the war, Parnell was again released from the university.

== Memberships and Societies ==
Parnell had been active on the public speaking circuit during the War, speaking at the Brisbane Theosophical Society and others. She attracted the attention of Margaret Thorp, a leader in Brisbane's peace movement, and John Latham, who were both impressed by her oratory skills, as much as her moderate views. Parnell was a member of the Scribblers ladies literary society in Brisbane in 1911–1912. She was President of the Lyceum Club in 1924–1925. She was a member and President of the Women's Club at UQ and helped to establish the Women's College at UQ. Parnell was also an active member of the Workers Educational Association (WEA), whose purpose was to bring the study of literature to a wider audience non-University audience. Her lectures on Chaucer and Shakespeare showed her continued interest in early English literature, and she had introduced Chaucerian studies into the curriculum at UQ whilst she had been lecturer there.

== Legacy ==
Parnell's work as a teacher and designer of the early curriculum at the University of Queensland was overshadowed by that of her successors.

Her impact on an entire generation of younger scholars is visible from curriculum and examination records, lecture scripts from the Queensland branch of the Workers' Educational Association, and her participation on the Brisbane public-speaking circuit, and entries in journals.

Her husband died in 1948. Hermiene Parnell died in 1956, and was survived by her son, Thomas Meredith Parnell (1925–2012).
