= James Foots =

Australian mining engineer and university administrator (1916–2010)

Sir James Foots AO FTSE HonFAusIMM FCIM
- Born: James William Foots; 12 July 1916; Jamieson, Victoria, Australia
- Died: 21 August 2010 (aged 94); Caloundra, Queensland, Australia
- Education: Coburg High School; University of Melbourne
- Occupations: Mining engineer; academic; company director
- Awards: Knight Bachelor; Officer of the Order of Australia

Sir James William Foots (12 July 1916 – 21 August 2010) was an Australian mining engineer and Chairman of Mount Isa Mines and Chancellor of the University of Queensland.

== Early life ==
James William Foots was born in Jamieson, Victoria on 12 July 1916, the son of William Foots, who worked as an explosives expert in the Jamieson gold mines and his wife Ethel Allen. His mother died when he was three, and he and his brother were raised by their grandparents. He attended Coburg High school where he completed his studies as the Dux of the school. He won a scholarship to attend the University of Melbourne, but was compelled to complete another matriculation year, when it was felt he was too young to attend university. He graduated with a degree in Mining Engineering in 1937.

== Career ==
Foots took up work at the Zinc Corporation mine in Broken Hill, and married Thora Thomas in 1939. During World War II, he and colleague, George Fisher worked on the creation of underground fuel storage tanks in Darwin during persistent bombing raids, before returning to work in Captain's Flat and Broken Hill in 1946. Foots moved to Mount Isa Mines, Queensland in 1952. He rose to the position of general manager of Mount Isa Mines Limited in 1955, succeeding George Fisher. Foots continued to lead the company later as chief executive and chairman of MIM Holidings Ltd, where he helped the group to expand metal production of lead, silver, copper and zinc.

Foots was appointed to the Senate of The University of Queensland in 1970, and also held the position of Inaugural Chairman of The University of Queensland Foundation from 1982 to 1985. He was a governor of the foundation until 1992. He helped to establish the Julius Kruttschnitt Mineral Research Centre in 1970, in recognition of Kruttschnitt's work in Mt Isa and in helping to develop the Silver Mine acquired by the university in Indooroopilly.

Foots was chancellor of The University of Queensland from 1985 to 1992. He was director of Uniquest from 1993 to 1997.

He was a chairman of Westpac from 1987 to 1989. He was president of the Australian Mining Council and the Australasian Institute of Mining and Metallurgy in 1974. He was on the board of Castlemaine Toohey's Limited from 1983 to 1985, the National Mutual Life Association of Australasia Limited from 1982 to 1985 and ASARCO Incorporated 1985–1987.

Foots died in Caloundra, Queensland on 21 August 2010. He was survived by his children and grandchildren. His wife Thora died in May 2010.

== Legacy ==
Foots established a number of scholarships to support students in Mining Engineering, Chemical Engineering and Metallurgical Engineering. A building was also named in his honour at the St Lucia campus of The University of Queensland.

A bridge in Mount Isa bears his name (2009).

== Honours ==
- 1972 – Australasian Institute of Mining and Metallurgy Medal
- 1975 – Foots was appointed Knight Bachelor in the 1975 New Year Honours in recognition of his services to the mining industry
- 1975 – The University of Melbourne Kernot Memorial Medal
- 1976 – Fellow of the Australian Academy of Technological Sciences and Engineering (FTSE)
- 1979 – Australian Institute of Management John Storey Medal
- 1982 – Honorary Doctorate of Engineering from The University of Queensland in 1982
- 1982 – J.P. Thompson Foundation Gold Medal
- 1984 – Advance Australia Award
- 1984 – Honorary Fellowship of the Australasian Institute of Mining and Metallurgy (HonFAusIMM)
- 1985 – The Salvation Army Distinguished Auxiliary Service Cross
- 1986 – Commander’s Cross of the Order of Merit of the Federal Republic of Germany
- 1987 – Mining and Metallurgy (UK) Gold Medal
- 1989 – Gold Medal, Company Director's Association of Australia (Qld)
- 1992 – Officer of the Order of Australia (AO)
- 1993 – Aus I.M.M. Beryl Jacka Award
- 2001 – Centenary Medal
- 2004 – Civilian Service Medal 1939–45 (Darwin Service 1943–1944)
- 1972 – Rotary International Paul Harris Fellow
- 1977 – Honorary Fellow, The Institution of Mining and Metallurgy, London
- 1987 – Life Member, The Canadian Institute of Mining and Metallurgy
- 2001 – Life Member, Australian Prospectors and Miners Hall of Fame
- 2003 – Inducted into the Australian Prospectors and Miners Hall of Fame

== Memberships ==
- 1956 – Member of council, The Australasian Institute of Mining and Metallurgy
- 1960 – Member of the C.S.I.R.O. Advisory Council
- 1971 – Member, Red Shield Appeal Committee, The Salvation Army, Brisbane
- 1989 – Member, Mater Hospitals Trust Board

Academic offices
Preceded by Sir Walter Campbell	Chancellor of the University of Queensland; 1985 – 1992	Succeeded by Sir Llewellyn Edwards
Business positions
Preceded by Sir Noel Foley	Chairman of Westpac Banking Corporation; 1988 – 1989	Succeeded by Sir Eric Neal
