= Alan Head =

Australian physicist

Alan Kenneth Head AO, FAA, FRS (10 August 1925 – 9 January 2010) was an Australian physicist, and Chief of the Division of Chemical Physics, at Commonwealth Scientific and Industrial Research Organisation from 1981 to 2010.

Head earned a Bachelor of Arts and Bachelor of Science from the University of Melbourne, PhD from the University of Bristol, and Doctorate of Science from the University of Melbourne. He was made an Officer of the Order of Australia in the 1992 Queen's Birthday Honours in recognition of his "service to science through research into the structure of solids and its application to industry".
