= Glenn Withers =

Australian economist, policy adviser, and academic

Glenn Alexander Withers
- Occupations: Economist, policy adviser, and academic
- Awards: Officer, Order of Australia (AO) (1991)

Academic background
- Education: BEc (1st Honors); A.M. PhD
- Alma mater: Monash University; Harvard University
- Thesis: (1975)

Glenn Alexander Withers is an Australian economist, policy adviser, and academic. He is an Honorary Distinguished Professor of Economics at the Australian National University and Visiting Professorial Fellow at University of New South Wales Canberra.

Withers' research interests span the fields of economy, society, and culture, with a particular focus on public policy regarding human capabilities and knowledge including labour, immigration, and education. He often draws on historical and comparative perspectives.

== Education and early career ==
Withers obtained an honours bachelor's degree in economics and politics from Monash University in 1968. He then held the positions of a foundation Senior Tutor at La Trobe University and a Teaching Fellow in the Economics Department at Harvard University and Lecturer at the Kennedy School of Government. During his time at Harvard, he earned a Master of Arts (A.M.) in 1974 and a Ph.D. in 1975. Subsequently, he served as a Research Fellow in Economics at the Institute of Advanced Studies at the Australian National University (ANU) until 1978.

== Career ==
Following his ANU appointment, Withers served as an associate professor of economics in 1979 at the School of Economics and Financial Studies of Macquarie University. Withers was then the Principal Economic Adviser at the Commonwealth Department of Employment and Industrial Relations in 1982– 83, returning to ANU as a Senior Research Fellow in Economic History in 1984. In 1986, he became Professor and chairperson at the School of Economics at La Trobe University, then CEO and Chief Commissioner of the Economic Planning Advisory Council and Commission 1991–97. In 1997 he again joined the Australian National University, as Professor and Head of Public Policy.

From 2007 to 2012, he was the founding chief executive officer of Universities Australia. After Universities Australia, Withers returned to the ANU as an Honorary Professor. He also became President of the Academy of the Social Sciences in Australia 2016–18 and President of the Australian Council of Learned Academies in 2018. At ANU he was Chair of the Harvard Menzies Scholarship Committee. In addition, he became chair of the Board of the World Bank’s Global Development Learning Network in 2018.

Withers was a Director of Law and Economics Consulting Group, Co-Managing Director of Applied Economics, and Chair of Blended Learning International. He was a board member of the Committee of Economic Development of Australia. He is a co-founder of the Social Cyber Group, and has been a consultant to business and community organisations, and also involved in arts organisations such as being a board member of the Canberra Theatre Trust and Chair of Human Veins Dance Theatre. He is an Adviser to the Public Interest Journalism Initiative and the Regional Australia Institute.

== Government and professional contributions ==
Withers has worked on various collaborative projects directly with governments in Australia. He was an adviser to Defence Minister Barnard on the 1972 abolition of military conscription in Australia. He served on boards of qualifications and training authorities such as the State Training Board of Victoria, and the Migrants Skills and Qualifications Board for which he was chair.

Withers held the position of Chair of the Task Force on Population Issues for Prime Minister Bob Hawke and Chair of the Task Force on Private Infrastructure Provision for Prime Minister Paul Keating. He was co-chair of the National Population Council, convening its Immigration Selection Systems Review. The Review's principal recommendations were accepted by the Hawke Government and established Australia's modern immigration points system, and led to award of an Officer of the Order of Australia for Withers. Withers also served as an Inquiry member for reviews of child-care, museum funding, refugee policy, working holiday makers, and co-chaired a review of micro-economic reform.

He was appointed by the Abbott Government to provide a Strategic Review of Employment Participation Programs for Cabinet.

Internationally, Withers advised the US Secretary of Defense on helping end the military draft in America, served as the co-chair of the Human Resource Development Masterplan Task Force for the Malaysian Prime Minister, advised the OECD on immigration and advised the Government of Bhutan on the establishment of its first university, the Royal University of Bhutan.

Withers has been involved in institution-building for Australia, having played a founding role in establishing the Bureau of Labour Market Research, Bureau of Immigration Research, the Productivity Commission, Crawford School of Public Policy, Australia and New Zealand School of Government, and Universities Australia.

== Research ==
Withers has authored more than 200 peer-reviewed articles Key research topics have included: gains from volunteer military recruitment, efficiency benefits from banking deregulation, relationship of immigration to aggregate unemployment, provision of incentives for regional and international student migrations, efficiency of public broadcasting, implications of federal governance, public value of cultural support including for arts and journalism, comparative standing of alternative wage-fixing systems, labor market forecasting, costs for higher education provision, and social dimensions of cybersecurity.

In addition to his academic publications, Withers has also authored many government reports, and contributed opinion pieces to media platforms such as The Times, The Australian, and the New York Times.

== Awards and honors ==
- Officer, Order of Australia (AO)
- Robert Gordon Menzies Scholar, Harvard University
- Fulbright Scholar, Harvard University
- Frank Knox Fellow, Harvard University
- Fellow, Royal Society of New South Wales
- Honorary Trustee, Institute of Public Administration of Australia
- Honorary Fellow, Australian Association of Tertiary Education Management
- Honorary Life Trustee, Committee for Economic Development of Australia
- Fellow, Academy of the Social Sciences in Australia

== Bibliography ==
=== Selected books ===
- Conscription: Necessity and Justice (1972) ISBN 978-0-207-12648-2
- The Economics of the Performing Arts (1993) ISBN 978-0-312-23438-6
- Immigration and Australia: Myths and Realities (with Stephen Castles, Robyn Iredale and William Foster) (1998) ISBN 978-1-86448-851-7
- Cambridge Economic History of Australia (co-edited with Simon Ville) (2014) ISBN 978-1-316-19448-5

=== Selected articles ===
- Withers, G., & Freebairn, W. (1977). Welfare Effects of Salary Forecasting Error in Professional Labor Markets. Review of Economics and Statistics, 61(2), 234–241.
- Withers, G. (1979). Private demand for public subsidies: An econometric study of cultural support in Australia. Journal of Cultural Economics, 3(1), 53–61.
- Withers, G. A. (1980). Unbalanced growth and the demand for performing arts: An econometric analysis. Southern Economic Journal, 46(3), 735–742.
- Withers, G. A. (1982). The 1916–17 Conscription Referendum: A Clio-metric Analysis, Historical Studies, 20(78), 36–46.
- Throsby, C. D., & Withers, G. A. (1986). Strategic bias and demand for public goods: Theory and an application to the arts. Journal of Public Economics, 31(3), 307–327.
- Pope, D., & Withers, G. (1993). Do migrants rob jobs? Lessons of Australian history, 1861–1991. The Journal of Economic History, 53(4), 719–742.
- Bagloee, S. A., Tavana, M., Withers, G., Patriksson, M., & Asadi, M. (2019). Tradable mobility permit with Bitcoin and Ethereum–A Blockchain application in transportation. Internet of Things, 8, 100103.

=== Selected reports ===
- Withers, G. A. (1988). Report of the Expert Working Party on the Immigration Selection System, Canberra: National Population Council.
- Withers, G. A. (1995). Final Report, Private Infrastructure Task Force, Report to the Prime Minister of Australia, Canberra: AGPS.
- Withers, G. A., & Twomey, A. (2007). Australia's Federal Future, Melbourne: Council for the Federation.
- Withers, G. A., Gupta, N., Larkins, N., & Curtis, L. (2015). Australia's Comparative Advantage. Final Report. Melbourne: Australian Council of Learned Academies (with Nitin Gupta, Natalie Larkins and Lyndal Curtis), 2015.
- Withers, G. A., Hanasz, P., Beaton, J., West, L., Radcliffe, M., & Kumar, S. (2017). The Social Sciences Shape the Nation (ed.), Canberra: Academy of the Social Sciences in Australia.
- Withers, G. A. Social Science Research and Intelligence in Australia; Final Report, Canberra: Academy of the Social Sciences in Australia, November 2019. (with Greg Austin, Elizabeth Buchanan, Dylan Clements and Liz West).
