= Sandro Porceddu =

Australian radiation oncologist

Sandro Porceddu is a head and neck radiation oncologist at Brisbane's Princess Alexandra Hospital and a Professor with the University of Queensland. He was president of the Clinical Oncologic Society of Australia (COSA) and chair of the Trials Scientific Committee of the Trans Tasman Radiation Oncology Group (TROG).

== Academic career ==
Porceddu was awarded a doctorate of medicine for his research into improving the integration of radiotherapy in the management of head and neck cancer and received the American Head and Neck Society/ANZ Head and Neck Cancer Society Christopher O'Brien Traveling Scholarship. He is chair of a phase 3 clinical trial group to assess radiation therapy alone versus in combination with carboplatin chemotherapy for the post-operative treatment of head and neck cancers.

== Publications ==
1. Sandro V Porceddu (2013). "Does fluorodeoxyglucose PET add to the management of the neck following curative radiotherapy in head and neck cancer compared with computed tomography?". Expert Rev Anticancer Ther. 13 (3): 279–84. doi:10.1586/era.13.10. PMID 23477515. S2CID 207214576.
2. Sandro V Porceddu (2005). "Utility of positron emission tomography for the detection of disease in residual neck nodes after (chemo)radiotherapy in head and neck cancer". Head & Neck. 27 (3): 175–81. doi:10.1002/hed.20130. PMID 15627258. S2CID 21375769.
3. Sandro V Porceddu (2007). "Hypofractionated radiotherapy for the palliation of advanced head and neck cancer in patients unsuitable for curative treatment--"Hypo Trial"". Radiother Oncol. 85 (3): 456–62. doi:10.1016/j.radonc.2007.10.020. PMID 18036689.
4. Sandro V Porceddu (2008). "Role of functional imaging in head and neck squamous cell carcinoma: fluorodeoxyglucose positron emission tomography and beyond". Hematol Oncol Clin North Am. 22 (6): 1221–38, ix–x. doi:10.1016/j.hoc.2008.08.009. PMID 19010270.
5. S V Porceddu (2008). "Predicting regional control based on pretreatment nodal size in squamous cell carcinoma of the head and neck treated with chemoradiotherapy: a clinician's guide". J Med Imaging Radiat Oncol. 52 (5): 491–6. doi:10.1111/j.1440-1673.2008.02001.x. PMID 19032396. S2CID 38368939.
6. Sandro V Porceddu (2011). "Results of a prospective study of positron emission tomography-directed management of residual nodal abnormalities in node-positive head and neck cancer after definitive radiotherapy with or without systemic therapy". Head & Neck. 33 (12): 1675–82. doi:10.1002/hed.21655. PMID 22076976. S2CID 3727485.
7. J Corry (2008). "Randomized study of percutaneous endoscopic gastrostomy versus nasogastric tubes for enteral feeding in head and neck cancer patients treated with (chemo)radiation". J Med Imaging Radiat Oncol. 52 (5): 503–510. doi:10.1111/j.1440-1673.2008.02003.x. PMID 19032398. S2CID 34975490.
8. D I Pryor (2011). "Distinct patterns of stomatitis with concurrent cetuximab and radiotherapy for head and neck squamous cell carcinoma". Oral Oncol. 1747 (10): 984–7. doi:10.1016/j.oraloncology.2011.07.023. PMID 21852185.
9. M K Ng (2005). "Parotid-sparing radiotherapy: does it really reduce xerostomia?". Clin Oncol (R Coll Radiol). 17 (8): 610–7. doi:10.1016/j.clon.2005.06.012. PMID 16372486.
10. Sandro V. Porceddu; Belinda Campbell; Danny Rischin; June Corry; LeAnn Weih; Mario Guerrieri; Marissa Grossi; Lester J. Peters (1 October 2004). "Postoperative chemoradiotherapy for high-risk head-and-neck squamous cell carcinoma". International Journal of Radiation Oncology, Biology, Physics. 60 (2): 365–373. doi:10.1016/j.ijrobp.2004.03.011. PMID 15380568.
11. David I Pryor; Benjamin Solomon; Sandro V Porceddu (September 2011). "The emerging era of personalized therapy in squamous cell carcinoma of the head and neck". Asia-Pacific Journal of Clinical Oncology. 7 (3): 236–251. doi:10.1111/j.1743-7563.2011.01420.x. PMID 21884435. S2CID 24908321.
