= Lilla Watson =

Australian artist-academic

Lilla Watson Lilla Watson
- Born: 1940 (age 85–86)

Lilla Watson (born 1940) is a Murri (Indigenous Australian) visual artist, activist and academic working in the field of Women's issues and Aboriginal epistemology.

== Early life and advocacy ==
Watson is a Gangulu woman who grew up in the Dawson River region of Central Queensland, her "Mother's Mother's country". Watson moved to Brisbane in the late 1960s, and her and other members of her family became well known through their involvement in the Indigenous community. Watson obtained a Bachelor of Arts degree from the University of Queensland.

== Aboriginal advocacy ==
After graduating from the University of Queensland, Watson worked at the university for ten years. In the last six years of her tenure at the university, Watson was a lecturer in Aboriginal Welfare Studies within the Social Work Department. In this capacity, she developed inter-disciplinary courses on Aboriginal perspectives, and served as an appointed member of the University Senate.

Watson has served as the inaugural president of the Aboriginal and Islander Child Care Agency, was a founding member of the Brisbane Indigenous Media Association, and was a member of the Aboriginal and Islander Independent School Board in the late 1980s. She has acted as a consultant and a member of working groups, panels and selection committees for many Government and non-Government bodies.

== Art career ==
After leaving her lecturer post in 1990s she developed her own medium for visual art: elaborate patterns of hundreds of holes scorched in layers of paper, pieces she calls "burnings." Many of her works draw their themes from traditional Aboriginal art and the landscape of Queensland. Watson describes her work as having an "ants eyeview", looking up through roots and foliage from beneath the ground, looking up through the earth, the "Land". As an artist, Watson has developed portrayals of her cultural and spiritual identity that are admired nationally and internationally.

Watson has expanded her art practice greatly over the years. From collaborative works, such as Soft Night Falling (2005) with saxophonist, Tim O'Dwyer to public artworks which can be seen in the New State Library (Brisbane, Qld), the Roma Street Parkland and the new Brisbane Magistrates Court (2004). In 2015, Watson was made an Honorary Doctor of the university of the Queensland University of Technology.

== Recognition ==
Watson is often credited with the quote:

If you have come here to help me, you are wasting your time. But if you have come because your liberation is bound up with mine, then let us work together.

This quote has served as a motto for many activist groups in Australia and elsewhere. Watson was heard delivering this quote at the 1985 United Nations Decade for Women Conference in Nairobi. However, the origins of the quote date back further. She has explained that in the early 1970s she had been part of an Aboriginal Rights group in Queensland. Together they came up with the phrase. For this reason, she is not comfortable being identified as the sole author.

In 2019, Watson's alma mater, the University of Queensland, awarded her an Indigenous Community Impact Award due to her impact as an academic, artist, and activist.
