= Pitch drop experiment =

Long-term experiment measuring the flow of pitch

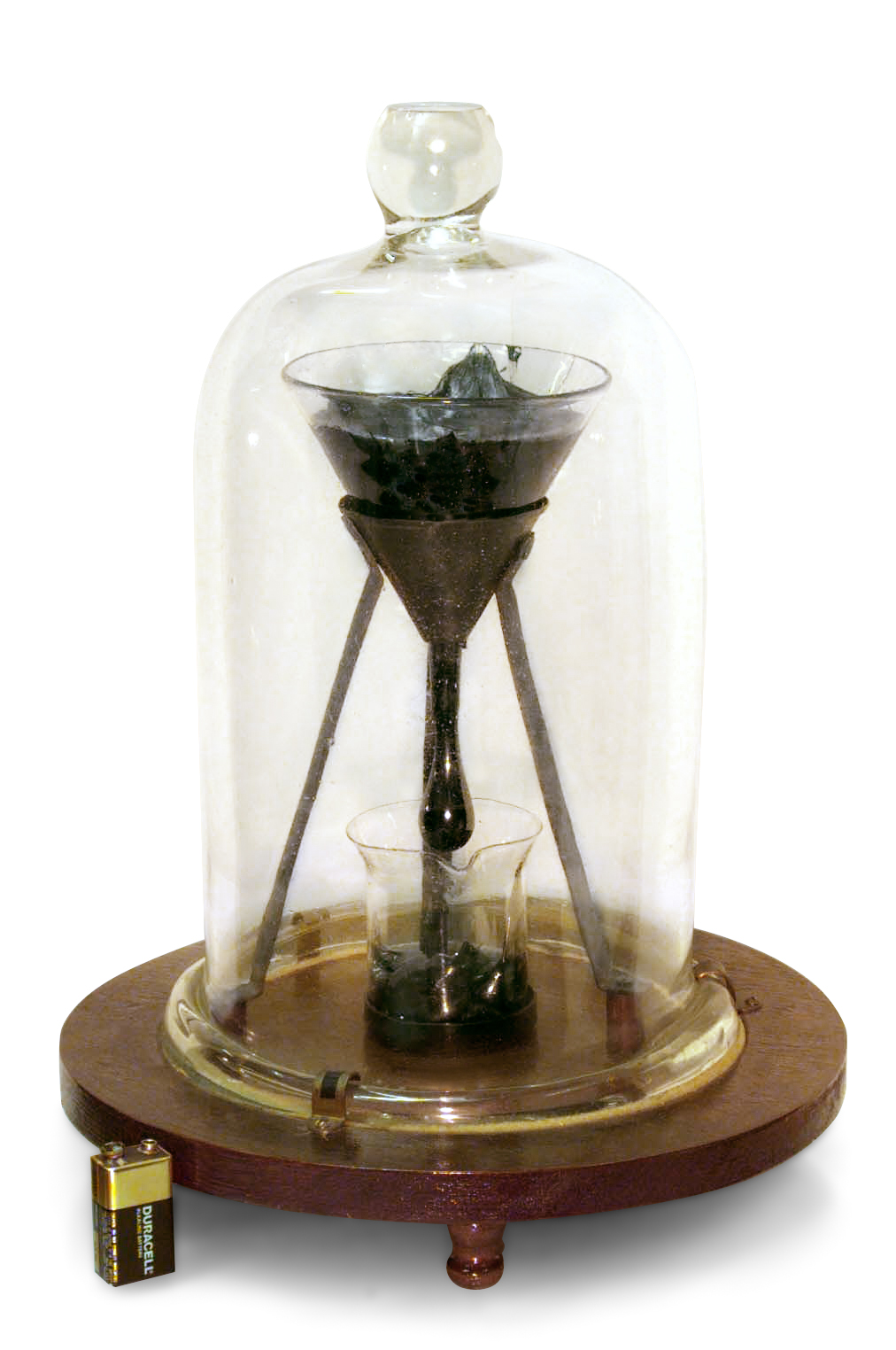
The University of Queensland pitch drop experiment, demonstrating the viscosity of bitumen

A pitch drop experiment is a long-term experiment which measures the flow of a piece of pitch over many years. "Pitch" is the name for any of a number of highly viscous liquids which appear solid, most commonly bitumen, also known as asphalt. At room temperature, tar pitch flows at a very low rate, taking several years to form a single drop.

== University of Queensland experiment ==
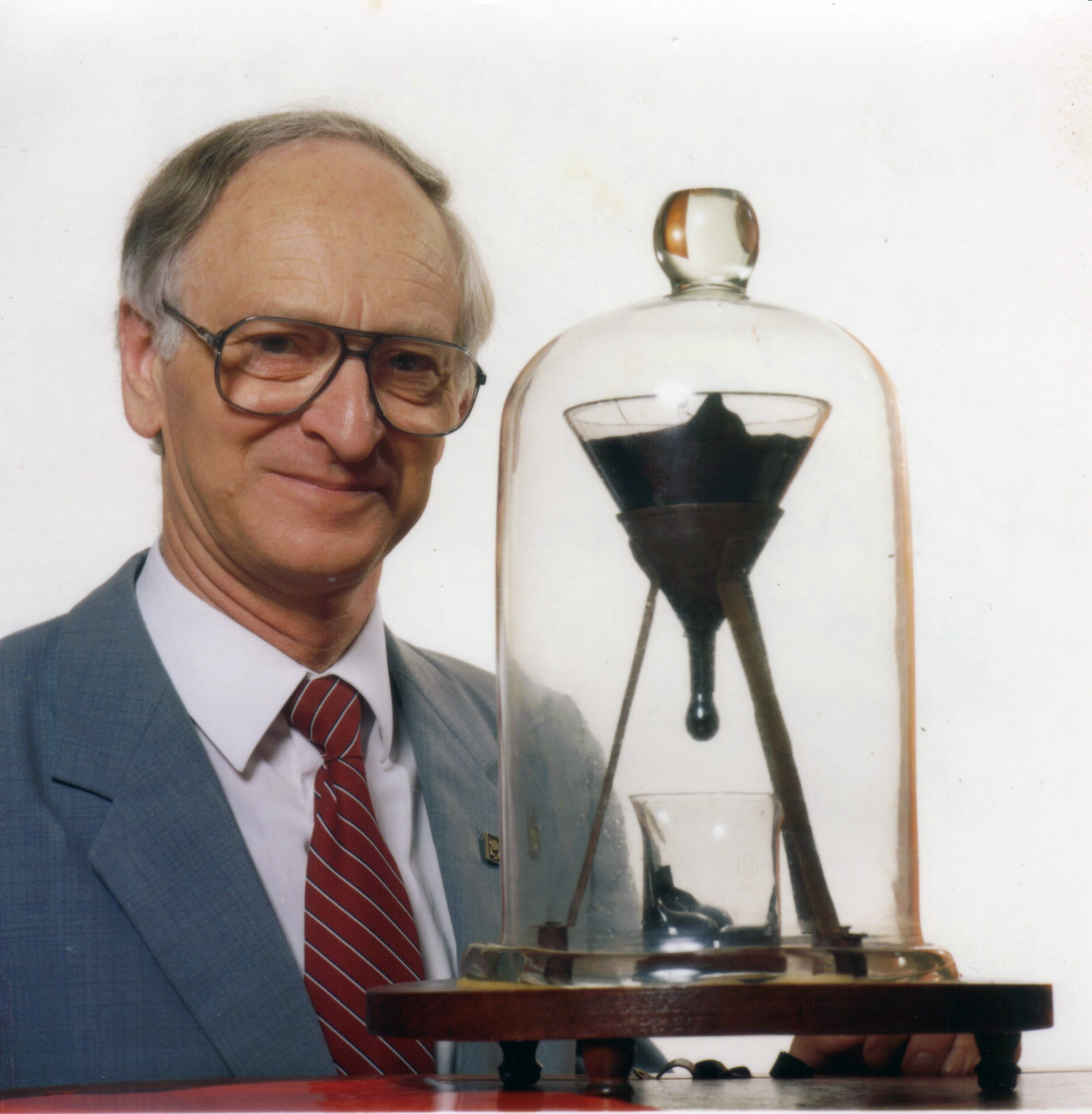
The University of Queensland pitch drop experiment, featuring its custodian, John Mainstone (taken in 1990, two years after the seventh drop and 10 years before the eighth drop fell)

The best-known version of the experiment was started in 1927 by Thomas Parnell of the University of Queensland in Brisbane, Australia, to demonstrate to students that some substances which appear solid are highly viscous fluids. Parnell poured a heated sample of the pitch into a sealed funnel and allowed it to settle for three years. In 1930, the seal at the neck of the funnel was cut, allowing the pitch to start flowing. A glass dome covers the funnel and it is placed on display outside a lecture theatre. Each droplet forms and falls over a period of about a decade.

Between 1961 and 2013, the experiment was supervised by John Mainstone.

The seventh drop fell at approximately 4:45 p.m. on 3 July 1988, while the experiment was on display at Brisbane's World Expo 88. However, apparently no one witnessed the drop fall itself; Mainstone had stepped out to get a drink at the moment it occurred.

The eighth drop fell on 28 November 2000, allowing experimenters to calculate the pitch as having a viscosity of approximately 230 billion times that of water.

This experiment is recorded in Guinness World Records as the "world's longest continuously running laboratory experiment", and it is expected there is enough pitch in the funnel to allow it to continue for at least another hundred years. This experiment is predated by two other (still-active) scientific devices, the Oxford Electric Bell (1840) and the Beverly Clock (1864), but each of these has experienced brief interruptions since 1937.

The experiment was not originally carried out under any special controlled atmospheric conditions, meaning the viscosity could vary throughout the year with fluctuations in temperature. Sometime after the seventh drop fell (1988), air conditioning was added to the location where the experiment takes place. The lower average temperature has lengthened each drop's stretch before it separates from the rest of the pitch in the funnel, and correspondingly the typical interval between drops has increased from eight years to 12–13 years.

In October 2005, Mainstone and Parnell were awarded the Ig Nobel Prize in physics, a parody of the Nobel Prize, for the pitch drop experiment. Mainstone subsequently commented:

I am sure that Thomas Parnell would have been flattered to know that Mark Henderson considers him worthy to become a recipient of an Ig Nobel prize. Professor Parnell's award citation would of course have to applaud the new record he had thereby established for the longest lead-time between the performance of a seminal scientific experiment and the conferral of such an award, be it a Nobel or an Ig Nobel prize.

The experiment is monitored by a webcam but technical problems prevented the November 2000 drop from being recorded. The pitch drop experiment is on public display on Level 2 of Parnell building in the School of Mathematics and Physics at the St Lucia campus of the University of Queensland. Hundreds of thousands of Internet users check the live stream each year.

John Mainstone died on 13 August 2013, aged 78, following a stroke. Custodianship then passed to Andrew White.

The ninth drop touched the eighth drop on 12 April 2014; however, it was still attached to the funnel. On 24 April, Professor White decided to replace the beaker holding the previous eight drops before the ninth drop fused to them (which would have permanently affected the ability of further drops to form). While the bell jar was being lifted, the wooden base wobbled and the ninth drop snapped away from the funnel.

=== Timeline ===
Timeline for the University of Queensland experiment:

Date	Event	Duration		
Date	Event	Years	Months	Bar chart
1927	Hot pitch poured			
October 1930	Stem cut			
December 1938	1st drop fell	8.1	98	
February 1947	2nd drop fell	8.2	99	
April 1954	3rd drop fell	7.2	86	
May 1962	4th drop fell	8.1	97	
August 1970	5th drop fell	8.3	99	
April 1979	6th drop fell	8.7	104	
July 1988	7th drop fell	9.2	111	
November 2000	8th drop fell (Note: After the 7th drop, air conditioning was installed, lowering the average temperature.)	12.3	148	
April 2014	9th drop fell (Note: 12 April 2014: 9th drop touched 8th drop; 24 April 2014: 9th drop separated from funnel during beaker change.)	13.4	161	
ongoing	10th drop falling	12.6	150	

== Trinity College Dublin experiment ==
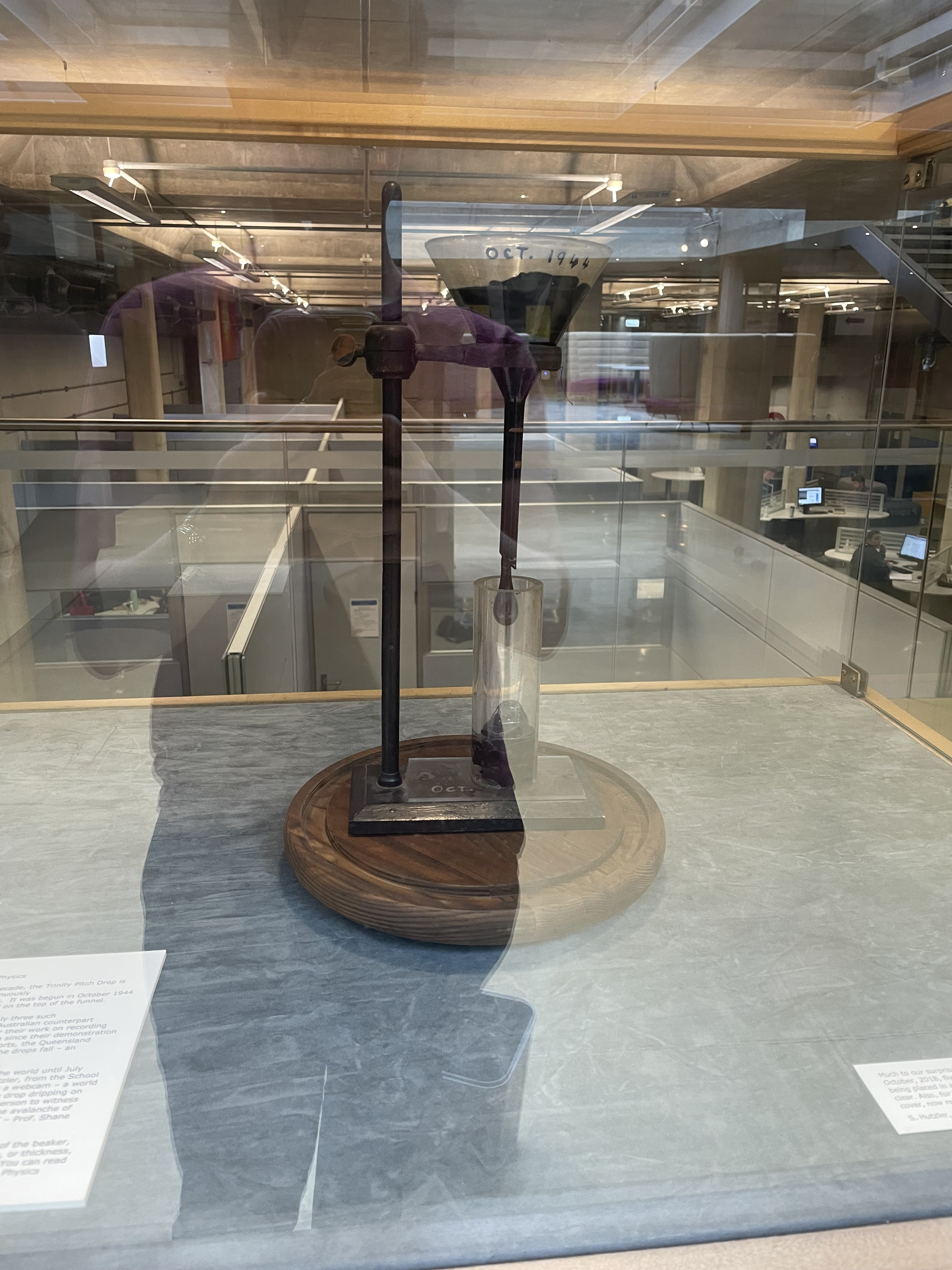
The Trinity College Dublin pitch drop experiment, pictured in the Eavan Boland Library, 2022

The pitch drop experiment at Trinity College Dublin in Ireland was started in October 1944 by a colleague of the Nobel Prize winner Ernest Walton while he was in the physics department of Trinity College. This experiment, like the one at University of Queensland, was set up to demonstrate the high viscosity of pitch. This physics experiment sat on a shelf in a lecture hall at Trinity College unmonitored for decades as it dripped a number of times from the funnel to the receiving jar below, also gathering layers of dust.

In April 2013, about a decade after the previous pitch drop, physicists at Trinity College noticed that another drip was forming. They moved the experiment to a table to monitor and record the falling drip with a webcam, allowing all present to watch. The pitch dripped around 17:00 IST on 11 July 2013, marking the first time that a pitch drop was successfully recorded on camera. The most recent drop fell in 2024.

Based on the results from this experiment, the Trinity College physicists estimated that the viscosity of the pitch is about two million times that of honey, or about 20 billion times the viscosity of water.

== University of St. Andrews experiment ==
A pitch drop experiment was started at the University of St Andrews in 1927, the same year as the Queensland experiment. No evidence has emerged of any contact between Parnell and the instigator or instigators of the St. Andrews experiment. The pitch in the St. Andrews experiment flows in a largely steady, but extremely slow, stream. At some stage (likely in 1984) St. Andrews professor John Allen modified the St. Andrews experiment to bring its setup closer to that of the University of Queensland experiment.

== Aberystwyth University experiment ==
In 2014, media reported that a pitch drop experiment had been recently rediscovered at Aberystwyth University in Wales. Dating from 1914, it predates the Queensland experiment by 13 years. But as the pitch is more viscous (or the average temperature lower) this experiment has not yet produced its first drop and is not expected to for over 1.000 years.

== National Museum of Scotland experiment ==
Another pitch-in-funnel demonstration was begun in 1902 by the Royal Scottish Museum in Edinburgh and is in Edinburgh at the Royal Scottish Museum's successor institution the National Museum of Scotland. The known records of its behaviour are incomplete: it is known to have dripped once at some time between 4 and 6 June 2016 and on at least one occasion in the past, but the time and number of the previous drip or drips is unknown. Furthermore, the June 2016 drip happened shortly after the experiment was taken out of museum storage, and the physical movement may have caused it to drip at that time.

== Demonstrations of Lord Kelvin ==
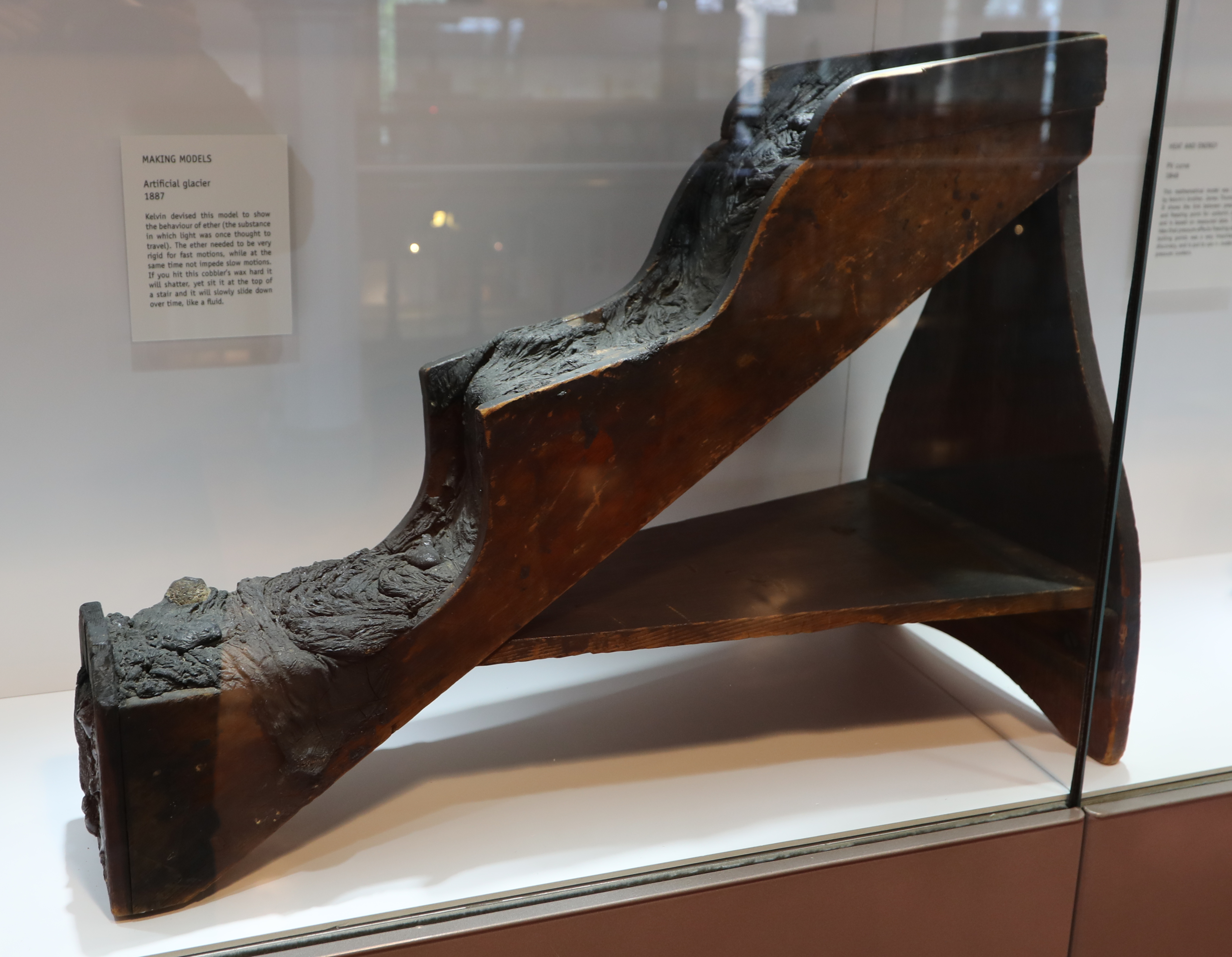
Kelvin's glacier model

In the Hunterian Museum at the University of Glasgow are two pitch-based demonstrations by Lord Kelvin from the 19th century. Kelvin placed some bullets on top of a dish of pitch, and corks at the bottom. Over time, the bullets sank and the corks floated.

Lord Kelvin also showed that the pitch flows like glaciers, with a mahogany ramp that allowed it to slide slowly downward and form shapes and patterns similar to glaciers in the Alps. This model was considered as an inspiration for the expected properties of luminiferous aether

== See also ==
- Rheology
- William James Beal, botanist who started a long-running seed germination experiment in 1879
- Oxford Electric Bell, ringing nearly continuously from 1840
- Centennial Light, light bulb burning since 1901
- The E. coli long-term evolution experiment (LTEE), a study in experimental evolution running since 1988
