= Jacqueline Jarrett Goodnow =

Australian psychologist

Jacqueline Jarrett Goodnow AC FASSA (born 25 November 1924 – 24 June 2014) was a cognitive and developmental psychologist. She studied the interaction of culture and thinking, writing a monograph on the use of Piagetian tasks with schooled and unschooled children in Hong Kong.

== Early life and education ==
Jacqueline Jarrett Goodnow was born on 25 November 1924, in Toowoomba, Queensland, Australia. She was the second of six children born to George Bellingen Jarrett and Florence Bickley Jarrett, a former secretary. Jacqueline's family moved to Sydney before she started high school. She attended a girl's high school there that did not offer physics, chemistry, or biology. Jarrett was enrolled at the University of Sydney at the age of sixteen and she graduated with first class honours in Psychology and a University Medal in 1944. She became a laboratory instructor at the university and worked as a temporary lecturer. Since the University of Sydney did not offer Ph.D. programs to women, Jarrett travelled to the United States and enrolled at Harvard; she received a Ph.D. from Radcliffe in clinical psychology. After graduating, she interned as a clinical psychologist at St. Elizabeth's Hospital in Washington, D.C. While attending Harvard, Jarrett met and fell in love with Robert Goodnow, a fellow graduate student. She also developed psychometric tests for Europeans, mainly refugees who might work for the army. They married in October 1951.

== Contributions and achievements ==
Jacqueline Jarrett Goodnow published eight books, over sixty journal articles and chapters. Some of her publications are titled:

- Children Drawing (1977)
- Children and Families in Australia: Contemporary Issues and Problems (1979)
- Home and School: A Child’s Eye View (1985)
- Women, Social Science and Public Policy (1985)

Goodnow's contributions to psychology centred on six themes: two-choice learning studies, research on thinking, culture and thought, the effects of perception, children's drawings, and social policy.

=== Two-choice learning studies ===
"In the view of the dominant behaviorism of the time, rewards were important determinants of behavior. But Goodnow showed that, when reward is kept constant, behavior differs depending on how the subject defines the situation. In a ‘gambling’ situation the tendency was to maximize reward, but in a problem-solving situation the subject considered longer runs of behavior, looking for a pattern, and an individual choice, win or lose, was not so important. Strategies, that are how the subject defined the situation, were also important in studies of concept attainment."

=== Research on thinking ===
When it came to experiments on thinking, subjects were asked to pick their own strategies and reward was not important.

"In a typical experiment situation the subjects sat facing a table with a number of cards on it. The task of the subject was to find the concept. The subject might be given a positive instance and told to find the concept. Subjects differed in the strategies they employed. A “focus” strategy was slow but sure, while a “scanning” strategy put many requirements on memory and was more risky. Or the subjects might be given one instance at a time, starting with a positive concept, told to write a hypothesis, given another instance, told to write a hypothesis again, and so on, until the subject could define the concept. The subjects learned from the positive instances."

The purpose of this test was to show that when people need to learn concepts they employ a method or strategy to help their performance.

=== Culture and thought ===
Goodnow’s interest in culture and thought came after travelling to Hong Kong when she became interested in the thinking process of children from different cultures. She used Piaget’s conservation tasks and two combinational tasks. This study was conducted by giving 500 Chinese and European boys age ten to thirteen the Piagetian tasks of conservation of weight, volume, and space, along with Raven’s Progressive Matrices task and Piaget’s factorial problem. Children who were unschooled had difficulty in performing the tasks that were required for the factorial problem and the Progressive Matrices task. When she gave the tests to sample of “average” (IQ 101–120) and “dull” (IQ 64–88) boys in Montgomery County, Maryland she found that the US boys of average intelligence scores were similar to the schooled and semi-schooled Chinese boys on the conservation tasks. When it came to the dull US boys their scores were inferior to the schooled and semi-schooled Chinese boys on the combinational tasks.

=== Perceptual activity and modality perception ===
The perceptual activity and modality perception were assessed to show the importance of tactile activity as well as comparing vision with active touch and visual with auditory matching.

=== Children’s drawings and the “Grammar of Action” ===
Goodnow wanted to see how children could complete a drawing when they were given restriction. For example, she would give a child a circle with two dots “eyes” low in the circle and asked them to complete the drawing. Grammar of Action was a tool that gave children simple figures and asked the children to draw them. The older the child was, the more creative their drawings were.

=== Social policy and development issues ===
Goodnow became interested in broader social issues, hence her books Children and Families in Australia and Women and Social Science and Public Policy. The first book discussed the problems of family life in the convict period to the modern problems facing Australia such as one-parent households, migrants, and violence against children. In this book she asked children about their family and school life and their friendships. Goodnow wanted to base the book on the perspective of children.

== Honours and recognition ==
Goodnow was made a Companion of the Order of Australia in 1992 for "service to research into child development and education in the discipline of psychology". She was elected Fellow of the Academy of the Social Sciences in Australia in 1976.
