= Lewis Keeble =

British and Australian town planner

Lewis Bingham Keeble, MC (1 January 1915 – 13 November 1994) was a British and Australian town planner, who became Professor of Regional and Town Planning at the University of Queensland, Australia.

== Life and career ==
He was born in Lewisham, London, and started work as a Planning Officer in local government in the UK. He also taught part-time. In 1950 he began full-time teaching at the University of Manchester then in 1955 moved to the University of London. While there he wrote one of his well-known early books, Town planning at the crossroads. He was elected President of the Royal Town Planning Institute (1965–66) and later National President of the Royal Australian Planning Institute (1972–74) (now the Planning Institute Australia).

He arrived in Brisbane, Australia, in 1968 to teach town planning subjects in the University of Queensland's Department of Architecture. He was appointed to a Personal Chair in 1970, then became the first Professor of the new Department of Regional and Town Planning in 1971. His inaugural lecture was called The Australian Planner's Dilemma but he was perhaps better known for his massive and detailed textbook on planning called Principles and Practice of Town and Country Planning. He completed his doctoral thesis in 1973. He was active in the Australian Institute of Urban Studies but left Australia with his wife, Betty Trevena, to return to Oxford in 1979 where they set up a town planning consultancy. Keeble's experience during this later period led to two additional publications, Town planning made plain and Fighting planning appeals.

He died in Oxford on 13 November 1994.
