= Thomas Parnell (scientist) =

British physicist (1881–1948)

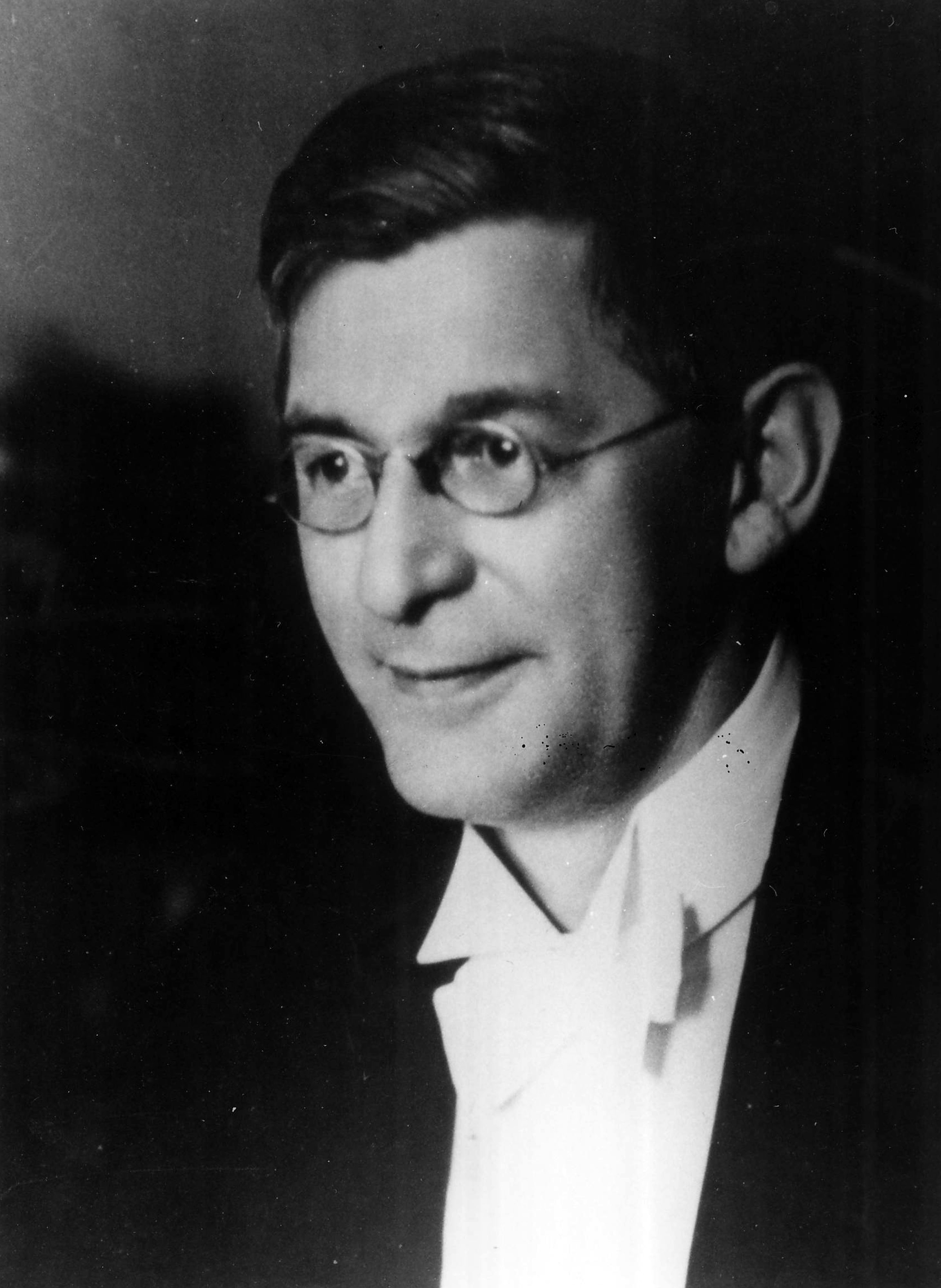
- Thomas Parnell of the University of Queensland, c.1920, Photo courtesy of the University of Queensland Archives, S177 p831
- Born: 5 July 1881; West Haddon, Northamptonshire, England
- Died: 1 September 1948 (aged 67); Indooroopilly, Queensland, Australia
- Education: St John's College, Cambridge
- Awards: Ig Nobel Prize
- Scientific career
- Fields: Physicist

Thomas Parnell (5 July 1881 – 1 September 1948) was the first Professor of Physics at the University of Queensland. He started the famous pitch drop experiment there.

== Education ==
Thomas Parnell was born in West Haddon, Northamptonshire, England and died in Indooroopilly in Brisbane, Australia. He was educated at St John's College, Cambridge, after winning a scholarship and received his B.A. in 1903. He received his M.A. from Cambridge in 1908.

== Career ==
Parnell took up a tutoring position at Trinity College, at the University of Melbourne, between 1904 and 1911, with the hope that it would enable him to have time to pursue research, and then apply for a Fellowship position at the Cambridge. However his teaching duties in physics, mathematics and chemistry were so numerous, that he never had the time to dedicate to research. He elected to move to Brisbane with friend and future wife, Hermiene Ulrich, also a lecturer at the newly established University of Queensland. He lectured in physics at the University of Queensland between 1911 and 1918, and was a professor between 1919 and 1948.

He enlisted in World War I as a private in the Australian Imperial Force in 1917, after having been in the Volunteers in England. He served as a gunner, often under the orders of his former students. He refunded his excess pay during the War, back to the university, to assist ex-servicemen planning on undertaking study. His wife, Hermiene, returned to lecturing work during World War I, to assist the university.

Parnell would begin his research into a high-precision method of measuring inductance in 1917. During 1922, he took part in an expedition to Goondiwindi to witness a total solar eclipse, and test Einstein's theory of relativity in this setting. In 1927 Parnell initiated an intriguing experiment to allow long-term observation of the behaviour of material known to have an extremely high coefficient of viscosity. Thus began his now famous pitch drop experiment, which, against all the odds, has been carefully preserved by UQ Physics to this day.

Under his leadership the physics department developed a useful service role, both in providing a scientific base for the Queensland hospital system's X-ray and radium services, and establishing a radon laboratory. During World War II, Parnell organised a radio sounding station for the Radio Research Board, which assisted with short wave radio communications.

Parnell was never able to return to full-time research, burdened by his numerous roles at the university. He was chairman (1919–23) and dean (1928–31 and 1935) of the Faculty of Science, a member (1932–35, 1938–44) of the Senate, and president (1938–44) of the professorial board. He was involved in the protracted negotiations that led to the creation (1933) of a massage school and the introduction (1937) of a diploma in physiotherapy. In 1935 he was a member of the planning committee for the faculty of medicine, and of a delegation to the Queensland Government that resulted in the establishment of a separate faculty of dentistry.

While president of the professorial board, Parnell represented the university on the Australian Vice-Chancellors' Committee. He was president of the Royal Society of Queensland (1928–29). In World War II he was a member of the Radio Research Board, the Queensland Cancer Trust, and the board of visitors of the Commonwealth Solar Observatory, Mount Stromlo, Australian Capital Territory.

Parnell died of hypertensive cardiorenal failure on 1 September 1948 at Indooroopilly, Australia, and was cremated.

== Legacy ==
A major building fronting the Great Court bears his name – the Parnell building. The physics department library which he had helped to establish was named the Parnell Memorial Library in 1948 and was eventually absorbed by the Dorothy Hill Engineering and Sciences Library at UQ in 1997.

In October 2005 he was posthumously awarded the Ig Nobel prize for Physics for the pitch drop experiment, along with the experiment's then custodian, John Mainstone.

His son, Thomas Meredith Parnell, became Professor of Electrical Engineering at the University of Queensland.

== See also ==
- List of Ig Nobel Prize winners
