= Otto Hirschfeld (physician) =

Australian medical practitioner, academic and university chancellor

Otto Saddler Hirschfeld (1898–1957) was an Australian medical practitioner, academic and university chancellor.

== Early life ==
Otto Saddler Hirschfeld was born on 24 March 1898 in Brisbane, Queensland. He was the eldest child of Eugen Hirschfeld, a physician from Prussia and German consul to Brisbane, and his Australian wife Annie. He had three brothers and two sisters. One of his brothers also pursued a medical career – Konrad Hirschfeld. Otto attended the Normal School and Brisbane Grammar School, enduring anti-German sentiment. He won a scholarship to attend the University of Queensland in 1916 and took his B.Sc. in 1919, and a Masters of Science in 1921. He moved to Melbourne to study medicine at the University of Melbourne completing his studies in 1923.

== Career ==
Hirschfeld served as a resident medical officer at the (Royal) Melbourne Hospital for eighteen months from 1923 to 1924. In 1924, he returned to Brisbane and entered into private practice. He married Joan Eliott in 1925, who was a nurse. Hirschfeld's father was interned during World War I, and was later deported. While Eugen Hirschfeld was absent from Australia, Otto Hirschfeld assumed responsibility for looking after his extended family.

He treated outpatients of Royal Brisbane Hospital from 1925. He took on in-patients from 1936 rising to senior part-time physician in 1938. From 1938, Hirschfeld was a lecturer in clinical medicine at the University of Queensland. He also lectured in pharmacology, diabetes, forensic medicine and pathology. He was head of the diabetic clinic at the Royal Brisbane Hospital from 1937–1957.

Hirschfeld became a member of the University of Queensland Senate in 1950. He was appointed Deputy Chancellor in 1952 and was Chancellor from 1953 to 1957. He escorted the Duke of Edinburgh on his royal tour of the university in 1954. The University of Melbourne honoured him with an LL.D. in 1956

== Publications ==
Manual for the Nurses and Masseurs’ Registration Board of Queensland

Brisbane Hospital Pharmacopoeia (as committee member)

== Memberships ==
Member and Fellow – Royal Australasian College of Physicians

Committee Member – National Health and Medical Research Council (Poisons Schedule Committee)

Member – Queensland Bridge Association

President – Australian Bridge Council (1949)

Member – Johnsonian Club

President – Johnsonian Club (1940–41, 1949–50)

== Legacy ==
Hirschfeld died on 29 May 1957 at Clayfield. He was survived by his wife, two sons and two daughters.

A building is named for him at the University of Queensland.
