= Eugen Hirschfeld =

German-American medical practitioner and politician

The Hon Dr. Eugen Hirschfeld
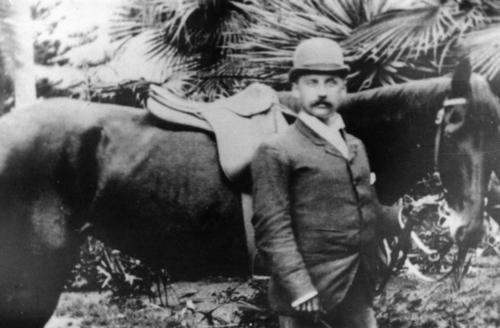
- Hirschfeld in 1920

Member of the Queensland Legislative Council
- In office 3 July 1914 – 2 November 1914

Personal details
- Born: Eugen Hirschfeld; 22 December 1866 Milicz, Silesia, Prussia
- Died: 18 June 1946 (aged 79) Bybera, Queensland, Australia
- Resting place: Bybera
- Spouse: Annie Eliza Sarah Saddler (m.1897 d.1944)
- Education: University of Strasbourg
- Occupation: Solicitor

Eugen Hirschfeld (22 January 1866 – 18 June 1946) was a medical practitioner, and member of the Queensland Legislative Council.

== Early life ==
Hirschfeld was born in January 1866 at Milicz, Silesia, Prussia, to Julius Hirschfeld, banker, and his wife Joanna (née Lvervey). He went to school in Breslau and then graduated from Strasbourg University in 1887. He took his Staatsexamen one year later, and graduated as an M.D. in 1889 for research on eye pigmentation.

Arriving in Brisbane in July 1890 and registered to practice a month later, he became deeply involved in the medical and scientific aspect of Queensland and honorary bacteriologist to the Brisbane Hospital, specializing in tuberculosis. In 1895, he wrote a paper on the need for compulsory inspection of meat to help eradicate tuberculosis 'in man and beast'.

Hirschfeld became a naturalised Australian in 1893 and, believing that dual nationality was possible, enrolled himself at the consulate as a German citizen to comply with German regulations. He was a leading figure in the German community, and 1906 he was appointed Imperial German Consul in Brisbane. In consultation with Governor William MacGregor, he founded a society for the propagation of German language and culture.

In 1911, Hirschfeld became a founding senator of the Queensland University and was admitted M.D. ad eundem. A year later he travelled overseas to represent the university at a congress in London. While away, he studied tuberculosis and cancer treatment methods for the government as a member of the Queensland Medical Board.

== Political career ==
On 3 July 1914 and less than one month before the outbreak of the First World War, Hirschfeld was appointed by the Denham Ministry to the Queensland Legislative Council. On the outbreak of war, Hirschfeld sought advice as to his position on the council being both a naturalised British subject and a German citizen, offering to resign, but the initial advice was that this was not necessary. However, others did not agree and so he resigned from the Council four months later, on 2 November 1914 with the government noting that he had always been loyal Queensland citizen.

== Later life ==
In February 1916, as part of a wider movement to intern all German citizens (whether or not naturalised British citizens), Hirschfeld was interned at Enoggera then one week later transported to Liverpool, New South Wales, being held there until he was released due to ill-health in August 1917. He was once again soon interned on the basis he had allegedly falsified medical evidence to secure his original release. A magisterial investigation ensued, and after a review of the case by Robert Garran, Hirschfeld was deported to Germany. He then travelled to the Netherlands before arriving in the United States of America where he practiced in Allentown, Pennsylvania.

After the war ended, Hirschfeld sought to return to Australia (where his family remained), but was refused. Due in part to representations from John Monash, Hirschfeld was finally allowed to return to Australia in 1927 and commenced medical practice at Wickham Terrace in Brisbane. He eventually moved to the Darling Downs area, purchasing stations around Inglewood where he spent 15 years carrying out botanical research into improving the quality of pasture for raising sheep and cattle.

== Personal life ==
On 21 April 1897, Hirschfeld married Annie Eliza Sarah Saddler at Holy Trinity Church, Kew, Melbourne, Victoria. They had four sons and two daughters with two of the sons, Konrad Hirschfeld and Otto Hirschfeld going on to distinguished medical and academic careers in their own right.

On 18 June 1946, Hirschfeld died at his property in Bybera near Inglewood and was buried there.

== Legacy ==
His grand-daughter Roisin Goss (née Hirschfeld, daughter of Konrad Hirschfeld and wife of Queensland Premier Wayne Goss) researched Eugen Hirschfeld's life as a PhD thesis at the University of Queensland.
