= Elizabeth Powell (scientist) =

Australian scientist

Elizabeth Powell is an Australian scientist who, in collaboration with her colleagues, established an internationally recognised liver research group, which is making significant contributions to the study of liver disease.

== Education ==
Elizabeth Powell is a graduate of The University of Queensland Medical School. She completed her early postgraduate training at the Royal Brisbane Hospital and completed her PhD at The University of Queensland. In 1992 she won a Menzies Scholarship to study at Oxford University, UK. She returned in 1994 to take up the position of Director of Clinical Training and Hepatologist at the Princess Alexandra Hospital. Subsequent periods of study included further training at Oxford University and Yale University in the US.

== Honours and awards ==
- 2012: Professor, School of Medicine, The University of Queensland
- 2011: NHMRC Practitioner Fellowship (50%) for 5 years
- 2010: Queensland Government Health Research Fellowship
- 2007: Queensland Government Smart State Health and Medical Research Fellowship
- 2006: NHMRC Practitioner Fellowship (50%) for 5 years
- 2001: NHMRC Practitioner Fellowship (50%) for 5 years
- 1996: Young Investigator Award, Gastroenterological Society of Queensland
- 1995: Viertel Clinical Investigator Award
- 1992: Menzies Scholarship awarded for postdoctoral research at Oxford University

== Research ==
The Liver Research Program led by Professor Powell has helped to shape two new paradigms: the importance of metabolic risk factors in the progression of chronic liver diseases, and more recently proposing altered hepatic regeneration and the ductular reaction as a potential driver of hepatic fibrosis.

The Liver Research Program aims to identify the pathogenic mediators/mechanisms driving chronic liver injury and to develop specific strategies to monitor and improve the outcome of treatment for patients with liver disease. The Research Program will use these strategies to develop new methods for prevention, early detection and personalized treatment for patients.

Current laboratory research activities: - defining the role of altered liver regeneration and repair mechanisms and the regulatory effects of infiltrating monocytes and tissue macrophages in the development of cirrhosis.

Current clinical research activities: - investigating the role of non-invasive techniques to diagnose liver injury and evaluate specific therapeutic interventions to determine whether they favourably modify the natural history of liver disease and are cost-effective.

== Fellowships ==
- 2001: NHMRC Practitioner Fellowship
- 2010: Queensland Government Health Research Fellowship
