= Mary Mahoney (physician) =

Australian medical practitioner, academic (1940–2021)

Mary Mahoney AO
- Born: Mary Deirdre Hirschfeld; 14 June 1940; Brisbane, Queensland, Australia
- Died: 15 September 2021 (aged 81); Hamilton, Queensland
- Parent: Konrad Hirschfeld (father)

Academic background
- Education: University of Queensland

Mary Deirdre Mahoney AO (14 June 1940 – 15 September 2021) was an Australian medical practitioner and academic.

== Early life and education ==
Mary Deirdre Hirschfeld was born in Brisbane, Queensland on 14 June 1940. She was the eldest daughter of Irish nurse Brigid (née Cooney) and surgeon Konrad Hirschfeld.

Mahoney was educated at St Cecilia's School in Hamilton, followed by All Hallows School in Brisbane. She won a Commonwealth Scholarship to the University of Queensland and graduated in 1963 with an MB BS.

== Career ==
Mahoney's first job was at Royal Brisbane Hospital where she spend two years. She then began as a neonatal paediatric registrar at the Royal Children's Hospital in 1966. She took a break from medical practice to give birth to her four children between 1966 and 1970. Wishing to work part-time, she found no openings available and sought to attend a refresher course. Finding none existed she was told by Dr Peter Schmidt, of the Post Graduate Medical Education Committee (PGMEC), that if she found women keen to attend such a course, he would develop the curriculum for it. She attended the first refresher course for women held in 1970.

Mahoney served on the Senate of the University of Queensland for 24 years and was Deputy Chancellor from 1996 to 1998 and 2010–2013.

Mahoney was state director of the Royal Australian College of General Practitioners (RACGP) training program for 25 years. She won the Rose-Hunt Award in 2001 and in 2005 she became the first woman to be made a Life Fellow of the RACGP. She was awarded an honorary doctorate of medicine by the University of Queensland in 2005.

Mahoney was appointed an Officer of the Order of Australia in the 2006 Queen's Birthday Honours for "service to medicine in the field of general practice, to tertiary education and university administration, and to the community through activities promoting the status of women and contributions to the early childhood education sector".

Mahoney died at Hamilton, Queensland on 15 September 2021.
