= Margaret Cribb =

Margaret Neville Catt Bridson Cribb AM (4 August 1924 – 12 August 1993) was an Australian lecturer in government and political science at the University of Queensland.

== Early life ==
Margaret Neville Catt was born in 1924. She was the only child of Mr and Mrs E. Neville Catt of Rockhampton. She attended Brisbane Girls Grammar School from 1938 to 1941. Margaret enrolled at the University of Queensland in 1944, residing at the Women's College. She became active in the Student Union, was the first female editor of the Union magazine, Semper Floreat in 1946, and Vice President of the Student Union. She was also President of the Women's Students Club.

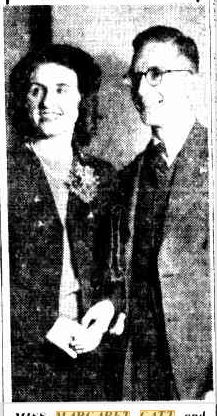
Margaret Catt and Ivor Cribb – engaged 27 July 1946. Photo used with the courtesy of Trove National Library of Australia, http://nla.gov.au/nla.news-article49350268

Cribb married Ivor Cribb, who had been President of the Student Union in 1947. The Cribbs moved to Southport in 1948 where Ivor taught at the Southport School.

== Career ==
Margaret Cribb returned to the University of Queensland to undertake her Honours degree in 1966, working as a tutor in the Government Department of the University of Queensland in 1965. She eventually rose to Reader. She took her M.A. in 1972. She held the honorary title of associate professor when she retired in 1987.

Cribb became an Honorary Fellow of the University of Queensland Women's College in 1992, after serving on the council from 1973 to 1985, and was president on two occasions. She published two books about the labour union movement in Queensland including the Politics of Queensland: 1977 and Beyond (1980) with P. J. Boyce, and Premiers of Queensland (1990) with Denis Murphy and Roger Joyce.

Cribb was recognised for her services to education and women's affairs in 1992, becoming a Member of the Order of Australia.

Cribb died of meningitis in Brisbane in 1993. She was survived by her husband Ivor and their two children.

== Legacy ==
The Margaret Cribb Child Care Centre at the University of Queensland is named for her. In 1995 the Margaret Cribb Memorial Prize was established at the same university.
