= 2006 Queen's Birthday Honours (Australia) =

The 2006 Queen's Birthday Honours for Australia were announced on Monday 12 June 2006 by the Governor-General, Michael Jeffery.

The Birthday Honours were appointments by some of the 16 Commonwealth realms of Queen Elizabeth II to various orders and honours to reward and highlight good works by citizens of those countries. The Birthday Honours are awarded as part of the Queen's Official Birthday celebrations during the month of June.

== Order of Australia ==
=== Companion (AC) ===
==== General Division ====
Recipient	Citation	Notes
Professor Ian William Chubb	For service to higher education, including research and development policy in the pursuit of advancing the national interest socially, economically, culturally and environmentally, and to the facilitation of a knowledge-based global economy	
John Dowling Coates	For service to the development of sport nationally and internationally through the Olympic movement promoting the well-being of youth and values of tolerance, understanding, peace and mutual respect between peoples of the world.	
Charles Paul Curran, AO	For service to business and commerce as a leader in promoting a dynamic and competitive financial sector and dialogue between business and government, and to the community in setting the strategic direction for many sporting, arts, not-for-profit and health care organisations.	
Professor David Morritz de Kretser	For distinguished contributions to public life as a medical researcher of international reputation in the field of reproductive biology, to the development of the biotechnology industry, and to bioethics.	
Donald Benjamin McDonald	For significant contributions to national life and to creative endeavours serving with a range of cultural, academic and arts organisations and to public broadcasting.	
Margaret Hannah Olley	For service as one of Australia's most distinguished artists, for support and philanthropy to the visual and performing arts, and for encouragement of young and emerging artists.	
The Honourable Shane Leslie Stone	For service to politics contributing to strengthening Federal-State-Territory intergovernmental processes, to furthering the bi-lateral relationship between Australia and the Asia/Pacific region, and to the oil and gas industry.	

=== Officer (AO) ===
==== General Division ====
Recipient	Citation	Notes
Roger David Beale	For service to conservation and the environment, particularly the development and implementation of major Australian government policies related to heritage, management of natural resources, and sustainability issues, and to fostering public involvement in local protection and restoration projects.	
The Honourable Justice Margaret Joan Beazley	For service to the judiciary and the law, particularly through contributions to professional and ethical standards, to the advancement of women in the legal profession and the community.	
Professor Julie Hazel Campbell	For service to science and to medical research, particularly in the area of cell biology of coronary artery and other vascular diseases, and to education.	
Terrence Arthur Campbell	For service to business and the financial services sector, to the arts, and as a supporter of corporate social responsibility through contributions to community and charitable organisations.	
Douglas Thorne Elix	For service to the information technology and services industry internationally, to the business sector through facilitating the introduction of world's best technology in many companies, and as a mentor to industry professionals.	
Emeritus Professor Kay Adrian Ellem	For service to medical research through significant contributions in the field of cancer immunotherapy.	
Rosemary Follett	For service to the Australian Capital Territory Legislative Assembly, particularly through influencing the development of self-government and as inaugural Chief Minister, and to community development, human rights and the advancement of women.	
Bernard Gannon	For service to the performing arts as a producer contributing to the development of film, television and theatre in Australia, and in promoting Australian productions and talented actors overseas, and to the community.	
Professor Margaret Ann Hamilton	For service to the community in the areas of social welfare and public health, particularly as a counsellor, researcher and academic in the fields of drug and alcohol related issues.	
Catherine Mary Harris	For service to community development through leadership roles in organisations related to education, health care, advancement of the status of women, the Catholic Church, the arts and sport, and to international relations between Australia and Asia, particularly support for Bhutanese people living in Australia.	
Leon Hertz	For service to business nationally and internationally, particularly through the print media sector, and to the promotion of Australian-American relations through corporate, educational, cultural and social activities.	
Emeritus Professor Ifan Odwyn Jones	For service to the mining and minerals industries, including research and education, to international trade, and to the community of Kalgoorlie-Boulder.	
Professor Raymond Michael Lowenthal	For service to medicine in the fields of oncology and palliative care and as a clinician, educator, researcher and contributor to professional organisations at state and national levels.	
Dr Mary Deirdre Mahoney	For service to medicine in the field of general practice, to tertiary education and university administration, and to the community through activities promoting the status of women and contributions to the early childhood education sector.	
Professor Ronald Clive McCallum	For service to the law, particularly as a tertiary educator and industrial relations policy adviser to government, and to the community through support for people with visual impairments and in the areas of social justice and human rights.	
Dr Colleen McCullough	For service to the arts as an author and to the community through roles supporting national and international educational programs, medico-scientific disciplines and charitable organisations and causes.	
Sister Helen Mary Monkivitch	For service to the community, particularly through the establishment of major health, aged and palliative care facilities in Victoria, and to the Catholic Church.	
Terence Francis Moran	For service to public sector leadership in key policy areas and program implementation, including technical and further education at state and national levels.	
Olivia Newton-John	For service to the entertainment industry as a singer and actor, and to the community through organisations supporting breast cancer treatment, education, training and research, and the environment.	
The Honourable William Frederick Ormiston	For service to the judiciary and to the law, particularly in the fields of equity and contract law, and through contributions to expanding and maintaining the collection of the Supreme Court Library, and to the Supreme Court Rules Committee.	
Maudie Palmer	For service to the community through activities fostering greater public knowledge and understanding of contemporary art and artists, and in curatorial and advisory roles related to work on collections of national significance.	
Paul Dean Ramsbottom-Isherwood	For service to business and commerce in the field of accountancy, and to the community through sporting, health, school and cultural organisations.	
Archibald Allan Scott	For service to the development of the transport industry, focusing on heavy vehicle driver safety training and through lobbying for improved infrastructure and development of an integrated freight network, and to the community through a broad range of sporting, medical research and aged care organisations.	
Richard Henry Searby	For service to education, particularly as Chancellor of Deakin University, to the community as a contributor to the programs of major cultural institutions, and to business and the law.	
Dr Scoresby Arthur Shepherd	For service to marine science, particularly in the fields of abalone biology and ecology through research, education and international collaboration, and to the conservation of coastal areas.	
Heather Margaret Smith	For service to the international community through the provision of humanitarian aid to people with leprosy and to people with physical disabilities, particularly through the programs of the McKean Rehabilitation Centre in Thailand.	
Dr Trevor Charles Smith	For service to medicine and to international relations through the provision of medical and support services to people with leprosy and to people with physical disabilities, particularly through the programs of the McKean Rehabilitation Centre in Thailand.	
Judith Eleanore Steel	For service to the international community through the provision of humanitarian aid to the people of Uganda as the founder of Uganda Australia Christian Outreach.	
Michael Joseph Thawley	For service to the community, particularly through significant contributions to the advancement of Australia's strategic and economic interests internationally.	
Dr Geoffrey Norman Vaughan	For service to scientific research and development, particularly through contributions to the development of government policy initiatives, to the growth of innovative technology-based Australian companies, and to education as a mentor and supporter of young scientists.	

==== Military Division ====
Branch	Recipient	Citation	Notes
Army	Brigadier David Hugh Chalmers	For distinguished service as the Commander, Combined Joint Task Force 629 on Operation Sumatra Assist.	
Air Force	Air Vice-Marshal Roxley Kenneth McLennan	For distinguished service in the fields of international relations and management of the Royal Australian Air Force.	
Air Force	Air Marshal Geoffrey David Shepherd	For distinguished service to the Australian Defence Force in senior command and staff appointments.	

=== Member (AM) ===
==== General Division ====
Recipient	Citation	Notes
Gwendolyn Isabelle Adams	For service to the agricultural sector in Tasmania, particularly through support for women on the land and the promotion of improved farming practices.	
Dr Peter Gordon Allen	For service to science in the area of pest animal management through a range of research and administrative roles, and to Rugby Union football.	
Beatrice Maud Ballangarry	For service to the community through proactive roles to improve social justice, economic advancement and education for Indigenous people.	
Dr Alan Raphael Barcan	For service to the study of the history of education and social sciences in Australia and as a contributor to raising public debate on educational issues.	
Professor David Leslie Barker	For service to legal education in Australia and the Pacific region, to professional associations, and to the community.	
Patricia Barkley	For service to the citrus growing and plant propagation industries as a pathologist and researcher, particularly in the areas of disease identification, cause, and control measures.	
Leonard Arthur Barnard	For service to jazz music as a drummer, to improving the professionalism of Australian jazz music, and to the encouragement of young musicians.	
Maxwell John Beck	For service to the construction and property development industries and to the community through fundraising and executive roles in a range of organisations and charities.	
Clive John Berghofer	For service to the community through philanthropic support for medical research, health, sporting and educational organisations in Queensland.	
Dr Andrew Bruce Berry	For service to medicine and to the community through the establishment and development of neonatal and paediatric retrieval services in New South Wales.	
Dr William David Birch	For service to geological science, particularly through the study and documentation of the geology of Victoria, and to a range of professional organisations.	
William James Blick	For service to the community, particularly through roles that contribute to the monitoring of federal systems of administrative law and national security.	
Dr Michael Ion Bossley	For service to the protection of marine mammals as a biologist, academic and conservationist and through involvement with a range of organisations that aim to protect these species.	
The Honourable Justice Sally Elizabeth Brown	For service to the law and to judicial education programs on social context issues and through leadership and mentoring roles to support the advancement of women within the legal profession.	
Adjunct Professor Michael John Bryce	For service as an architect to the development of industrial, graphic and commercial design reflecting Australian heritage and the environment, to education, and to the community.	
Susan Zena Bures	For service to the community through a range of multicultural, Jewish, arts and youth organisations in New South Wales.	
Brendan John Butler	For service to the community through public sector roles, to the investigation of corruption and misconduct, and to the development of criminal justice administration in Queensland.	
Donald Campbell	For service to soccer as a media commentator, referees' inspector, coach and administrator, and to the community.	
John James Cannons	For service to the community, particularly through executive and fundraising roles with Variety, The Children's Charity.	
Brian Ralph Carter	For service to business and commerce through the building society industry, and to the community through health care and medical research organisations.	
Hilary Yvonne Clarke	For service to the community through the establishment of hospice and home-based palliative care services and programs to provide emotional support for the families and carers of people with terminal illnesses.	
The Honourable James George Clarko	For service to the Western Australian Parliament serving in various parliamentary positions, including Speaker of the Legislative Assembly, and to the community of the City of Stirling.	
Jeffrey Keith Clift	For service to primary industry, particularly through the development and administration of grain bulk storage facilities, and to the community of Ardrossan.	
Brian Clouston	For service to the development of the Australian book publishing industry, particularly through the publication of specialist educational and reference material, and to wildlife protection.	
Mark Alan Cocks	For service to the community in the area of organ donation and transplantation, particularly through the donor support and public awareness raising programs of Transplant Australia, the Australian Transplant Games and the World Transplant Games Federation.	
Gregory Ivan Combet	For service to industrial relations and through advocacy for the improved health and safety of workers, including people affected by asbestos-related diseases, and to the community.	
Dr Lyndsay Genevieve Connors	For service to education as a contributor to the development of education policy at state and national levels, and to the community, particularly through roles supporting the welfare of children.	
Maurice Gerard Corcoran	For service to people with disabilities, and as a contributor to the development of national standards for public transport.	
Jeremy Nicolas Cordeaux	For service to the radio broadcasting industry and to the community of South Australia, and through support for a variety of charitable organisations.	
Victor Charles Court	For service to the community through executive and management roles with the Asthma Foundation of Western Australia.	
Professor Francis Allan Crowther	For service to education as a contributor to the development of educational and school community leadership models, and through promoting public education.	
Geoffrey Alfred Davis	For service to education, particularly through the introduction and promotion of Chinese language teaching in the public school sector in Western Australia and the establishment of the Chinese Language Teachers' Federation of Australia.	
The Honourable Keith De Lacy	For service to the Queensland Parliament as Treasurer, to business and public administration, and to the community of Cairns.	
Helen Dickie	For service to politics through the National Party of Australia, and to the community through a range of rural and regional arts organisations.	
Martin Maitland Dickson	For service to the community as a benefactor and adviser to performing arts organisations.	
Christopher Matthew Doogan	For service to the law and to public administration as Chief Executive and Principal Registrar of the High Court of Australia, and to professional and community organisations.	
Ralph Douglas Doubell	For service to athletics through administrative roles, particularly with Athletics New South Wales, and as a competitor.	
Ronald Arnold Doubkin	For service to the building and construction industry through professional and business organisations, improvements in training opportunities, superannuation and income protection services, and safety standards.	
Dr Paul Francis Dunne	For service to medicine and to the community through the development of palliative care services in Tasmania.	
Colin Robert Dyke	For service to aquaculture and to the environment, particularly through organisations involved in the protection of estuarine and coastal environments and the development of water quality measures and environmental management systems.	
Peter John Ellery	For service to the development of the minerals and energy industries in Western Australia, particularly through effective communication and education programs to promote community awareness.	
Lorraine Clare Elliott	For service to the Victorian Parliament and to the community through involvement in a range of youth, cultural and health organisations.	
Associate Professor Anthony William English	For service to veterinary science in the field of wildlife health and conservation through research, education and professional organisations, and to the deer industry in Australia.	
Ronald Barry Evans	For service to business and commerce, to Australian Rules football as a player and administrator, and to the community through support for a range of charitable organisations.	
Bradley Scott Fittler	For service to Rugby League football and to the community through support for organisations related to improving the health and well-being of children.	
Herbert Flugelman	For service to the visual arts as a sculptor and teacher and through support for educational, professional and benevolent organisations.	
Emeritus Professor Nigel Ross Forteath	For service to the fishing industry in Tasmania and to marine and freshwater biology.	
Dr Herbert Freilich	For service to the community through philanthropic support for a range of organisations and as a medical practitioner.	
Denis Vincent Galligan	For service to the law in Queensland in a range of public sector roles including Solicitor-General, and to the community through the Catholic Archdiocese of Brisbane Social Welfare Commission.	
Joseph Israel Gersh	For service to business, commerce and public sector administration, and to the community, particularly through Jewish organisations.	
Amee Dorothy Glass	For service to the community through the Ngaanyatjarra Language Project and the development of educational resources to aid literacy and cultural understanding.	
Professor David Headley Green	For service to the earth sciences, particularly in the fields of petrology and geochemistry through research, educational and advisory roles and contributions to public policy formulation.	
Professor Rhonda Dawn Griffiths	For service to public health, particularly through contributions to diabetes research and education, and to the nursing profession.	
Dr Bela Grof	For service to primary industry through research and the development of sustainable tropical pasture technology to increase food production, rural incomes and scientific knowledge in Asia, Central and Southern America and Australia.	
Hilton Ross Grugeon	For service to the community through contributions to business and economic development in the Hunter region, and as a benefactor to a range of not-for-profit organisations.	
Michael Solomon Gudinski	For service to the entertainment industry through the promotion of Australian music recording artists, as an advocate for young people in the music industry, and to the community.	
Dorothy Elisabeth Hackett	For service to the community through the Ngaanyatjarra Language Project and the development of educational resources to aid literacy and cultural understanding.	
The Reverend Professor James Mitchell Haire	For service to religion and to the community through the promotion of ecumenical and interfaith dialogue, the Uniting Church in Australia and theological education.	
Marion Mildred Halligan	For service to literature as an author, to the promotion of Australian writers and to support for literary events and professional organisations.	
Dr Guy Livingston Hamilton	For service to people with disabilities, particularly through the development of educational and support services.	
Professor Phillip Alexander Hamilton	For service to tertiary education, to research in the fields of radioastronomy and astronomy, to a range of scientific organisations, and to the community.	
Terence John Hampson	For service to conservation and the environment, particularly through efforts to preserve the natural habitat of Fraser Island, to local government and politics in Queensland, and to the community.	
Professor Gregory James Hancock	For service to engineering as a contributor to the development of industry standards, particularly in relation to cold-formed steel structures, through research roles relating to the behaviour and design of thin-walled structures, and as an educator.	
James Geoffrey Harrowell	For service to international relations, particularly the development of legal and business links with China.	
Phillip Lloyd Harry	For service to Rugby Union football as a player and in a range of executive roles, and to the community through support for charitable organisations.	
Emeritus Professor Riaz Ul Hassan	For service to sociology, particularly as an educator, author and researcher, and as a contributor to the understanding of housing needs of disadvantaged individuals and communities.	
Peter Edward Hebbes	For service to the community as a fundraiser, particularly on behalf of the Golden Stave Foundation and Variety, The Children's Charity, and to the music industry.	
Graeme Leslie Herring	For service to business through the Australian Tax Research Foundation, to the accountancy profession, and to the community through Anglican Church organisations.	
Dr Matthew John Hindson	For service to the arts as a leading Australian composer and teacher of music, and through the wide promotion of musical works to new audiences.	
Ralph James Hoey	For service to the community through the establishment and provision of education, health and development programs in Nepal and Kenya, and creating opportunities for young Australians to travel and volunteer their time in developing countries.	
Dr Douglas Macdonald Hogarth	For service to the sugar industry through research and development of sugar cane breeding programs.	
Denis Robert Hogg	For service to hospital administration and health care services through a range of organisations, including the Australian Private Hospitals Association.	
Professor Michael John Hough	For service to the community of the Illawarra region through a range of youth, church, education, music and service organisations.	
Jonathan McDougall Hutchison	For service to tourism and business through promoting Australia as a travel destination and in leadership and advisory roles with industry organisations.	
Dr Robert Lindsay Iles	For service to education as Principal of The Scots College, Sydney and through support for professional organisations, and to the community.	
Dr Richard Eldred Jane	For service to veterinary science, particularly through leadership roles within professional and regulatory organisations in New South Wales, to local government, and to the community.	
Professor Philip John Jennings	For service to the environment through the development of strategic conservation policies and initiatives in the areas of wetland and urban bushland protection, to the establishment of the Regional Parks program, and to environmental education.	
Professor Alan Murray Johnson	For service to science in the field of molecular parasitology, to scientific research and education, and as editor-in-chief of the International Journal for Parasitology.	
Dean Mervyn Jones	For service to cricket as a player, coach and commentator and to the community through fundraising activities for organisations assisting people with cancer.	
Jacqueline Kay	For service to people with disabilities through the Access Dinghy Foundation and Sailability Australia.	
Susan Kendall	For service to the community in the area of social welfare, particularly through programs supporting victims of violent crime in Australia and in East Timor.	
Janine Anne Kirk	For service to the city of Melbourne through contributions to the identification, design and facilitation of projects to enhance the business, tourism, cultural and intellectual standing of the city, and to child welfare organisations.	
Ronald Keith Langman	For service to the building and construction industry through the establishment of collaborative marketing ventures and as a mentor for young entrepreneurs.	
Imogen Dymphna Laurie	For service to people with disabilities as an advocate for improved disability policies and services through community and public sector organisations.	
Craig Lawrence	For service to the community through a range of executive roles in organisations concerned with business and finance, national security issues and crime prevention, and for encouraging national pride and identity.	
Dr Michael Simon Lekias	For service to the Greek community through a range of business, cultural, sporting and welfare organisations, to local government, and to medicine.	
Laurence John Lewis	For service to veterans as an administrator of aged care and health services, as an adviser to state and national ex-service welfare groups, and through support for charitable organisations.	
Anne Lynch	For service to support parliamentary processes, particularly the administration of the practices of the Senate and its committees, to promotion and understanding of the role of the Senate, and to assisting parliaments of Pacific Island states.	
Mary Taylor Macha	For service to the Indigenous community of Western Australia through representation of artists, the marketing and promotion of their works as contemporary art forms, and to the preservation of traditional skills associated with cultural material.	
Dr John Michael Mack	For service to mathematics education, particularly in the area of curriculum development, to the arts, and to a range of academic professional organisations.	
Dr Susan Margaret Magarey	For service to education as a pioneer of women's studies as an academic discipline, to tertiary curriculum development, and to professional and historical organisations.	
Jill Robin Margo	For service to journalism and to the community, particularly through reporting, promoting and raising awareness of men's health issues, and as a contributor to a range of cancer support organisations.	
Bruce Gordon Martin	For service to opera as a performer, to fundraising and advocacy for opera companies, and as a tutor and mentor of young opera singers.	
Dr Hugh Ormsby Martin	For service to medicine as a paediatric surgeon, particularly in the area of the care and prevention of burns, and in medical education and training.	
Anne Therese McCoy	For service in the field of physiotherapy, particularly as a contributor to the development of paediatric physiotherapy and through clinical, teaching and research roles, and to the community.	
Donald Francis McDonald	For service to the community in regional areas of Queensland, particularly Cloncurry, through agricultural, transport infrastructure, political, community health and volunteer organisations.	
Jeffrey John McMullen	For service to journalism, particularly through efforts to raise awareness of economic, social and human rights issues in Australia and internationally, and to the community through support for charitable organisations.	
Professor Anne Mary McMurray	For service to nursing, particularly the development of nurse education and community health practices, and as a contributor to professional publications.	
Suzanne Patricia Miers	For service to the community through the establishment of the National Organisation for Foetal Alcohol Syndrome and Related Disorders, to community education and to reconciliation.	
Edwin Percival Milliken	For service to the community of the Northern Territory as a psychologist, to education and health policy development, and to church and social welfare organisations.	
Emeritus Professor Bernard Paul Moulden	For service to tertiary education, to marine scientific research, and to the community of northern Queensland through business and cultural organisations.	
Les James Murray	For service to soccer as a television and radio producer, journalist and presenter, and through national and international football organisations.	
His Honour Lloyd Kingsley Newman	For service to the law through the promotion of programs to assist juvenile offenders, to the District Court and Youth Court of South Australia, and to a range of sporting, animal welfare and motor sport organisations.	
Albert Newton	For service to the entertainment industry as a presenter, actor and comedian, and through support for a range of medical research and charitable organisations.	
The Reverend Canon Alan Charles Nichols	For service to the community through charitable and refugee organisations, and to the promotion and facilitation of dialogue between government and the Anglican Church of Australia on a range of social welfare policies and practices.	
John Thomas O'Brien	For service to the community of Cairns through contributions to business, youth development, cultural and sporting organisations, events coordination, and philanthropic activities.	
Barry Trevor Oldfield	For service to the community through support for charitable organisations, particularly Kids West and the Millennium Foundation.	
Deborah Ruth Page	For service to community health, particularly through the Cancer Council of New South Wales, and to commerce and accountancy in a range of executive roles with business and professional organisations.	
Maudie Palmer	For service to the community through a range of cultural and social welfare organisations, including the Australiana Fund, the Official Establishments Trust and the South Melbourne Community Chest.	
Emeritus Professor Peter Angas Parsons	For service to science in the areas of population genetics and radiation biology, to research and tertiary education, and through executive roles with a range of scientific organisations.	
The Honourable Dr Peter James Patmore	For service to the Tasmanian Parliament, particularly through the introduction of fiscal, education and law reforms, and to contributions in the portfolio areas of planning, the environment and industrial relations.	
Professor Debora Margaret Picone	For service to public administration in New South Wales, particularly to health services management through the development of integrated health policies and strategies for the south-western Sydney area, and to nursing education and administration.	
Associate Professor John Francis Pidgeon	For service to education, particularly through the Swinburne University of Technology, to the development of curriculum and qualification transfer agreements for international students, and as an academic administrator and teacher.	
Professor Leon Piterman	For service to family medicine through distance education for doctors in remote areas, to research and student training, and to international medical education.	
Paula Cecilia Pither-Mills	For service to women living in rural and regional communities on matters related to social justice, the environment, road safety and community health, and to adult literacy and distance education.	
Desmond John Power	For service to tourism development in Queensland through the identification, facilitation and promotion of major cultural and sporting events, to the film, television, and broadcasting industries, and to the community.	
Ian Peter Predl	For service to education and training, particularly through contributions to the establishment of the technical and further education system in Victoria, and to the community.	
Professor Saxby Arthur Pridmore	For service to psychiatry through research into a range of mental illnesses, advocacy for new and revised treatment regimes, and in health administration roles.	
Stuart Picken Purves	For service to the arts as a promoter and supporter of visual contemporary artists and to the development and implementation of a code of professional practice in the commercial galleries sector.	
Douglas John Rathbone	For service to the community through executive roles and contributions to a range of children's cancer support organisations, particularly the Children's Cancer Centre Foundation, to chemical engineering and to viticulture.	
Professor Dimity Alexandria Reed	For service to architecture in Victoria as a supporter of excellence in urban design, to the development of affordable and sustainable housing, and to the community.	
Christopher John Renwick	For service to business through a range of executive roles in the mining industry, to fostering international trade relations and the development of export markets, and to the community.	
Dr George Dimitri Repin	For service to medicine, particularly through the Australian Medical Association, to the development of post graduate education, and to medico-legal and professional organisations.	
Linton Reynolds	For service to local government through the Western Australian Local Government Association, to the City of Armadale, to the development of transport policies, and to the community.	
The Reverend Father Chris Keith Riley	For service to disadvantaged youth through the establishment of 'Youth Off The Streets' and the development of a range of assistance and mentoring initiatives for adolescents, and to the welfare of children overseas through humanitarian assistance efforts.	
Dr James Roche	For service to diagnostic radiology as a clinician and educator and through support for the development of interventional radiology programs.	
Dr Colin Lewis Rubenstein	For service to the community through executive roles with a range of Jewish organisations, to the advancement and promotion of multiculturalism, and to the academic discipline of political science.	
Dr David John Rumsey	For service to education and training as a consultant, through contributions to industry development, and to the technical and further education sector.	
Marie Louise Russell	For service to rural and regional communities in New South Wales through a range of organisations involved in environmental conservation, health care and women's issues.	
John Horton Seymour	For service to primary industry through the Royal Agricultural Society of Victoria, to fostering the development of the agricultural show movement, and to banking and rural finance.	
Desmond Percival Smith	For service to engineering through development of rail transport systems, particularly as a contributor to the planning and design of the Alice Springs to Darwin rail line.	
Dr David Harris Solomon	For service to journalism as a commentator on legal, political and constitutional law issues, as a contributor to a range of professional organisations concerned with the law, and to education.	
Peter Spira	For service to the housing and construction industry as an architect, to the development of design standards and building methods, and to the Jewish community.	
Judith Anne Stone	For service to the community as an entertainer at fundraising events for a range of charitable organisations, and as a singer.	
Rolland Leslie Tasker	For service to sailing as a sail maker, yacht designer and builder, as a competitive yachtsman, and to maritime related cultural institutions.	
Judith Patricia Tatow	For service to the Indigenous community of the Rockhampton region through social welfare and sporting programs, and as an adviser on housing and health policy issues.	
Barbara Tjikatu	For service to the Indigenous community of the Northern Territory as an Anangu Elder, and in the preservation and management of the Uluru-Kata Tjuta National Park.	
Leslie Thomas Tree	For service to public administration in New South Wales, particularly in the development and implementation of law enforcement policies.	
Robert Turner	For service to people with disabilities through executive and fundraising roles to improve research and treatment of spinal cord injuries, and to the community.	
Murray Bruce Tyrrell	For service to the Australian wine industry through contributions to the improvement of grape quality, research, tourism and the development of export opportunities.	
Pieter Adrianus van der Hoeven	For service to business and commerce, particularly promoting South Australia as a business and convention destination, and to hospitality training.	
Gino Luigi Vitucci	For service to the Australian wine grape growing industry, including the introduction of new varietal grape species, and to the community of Griffith.	
Dr John Lane Waddy	For service to cardiology through contributions to research and improved treatments and procedures, to medical education and professional development, and to the community.	
Andrew Hugh Walsh	For service to the events management industry through the creative direction and production of major outdoor performances and public celebrations in Australia and internationally, and to education.	
Ian Maxwell Watts	For service to the community of the Northern Territory, particularly through the Australian Red Cross and the Rotary Club of Darwin, and through the introduction of disaster management and response systems.	
Emeritus Professor David Weisbrot	For service to the law in the areas of law reform, education and access to legal services, and through contributions to research, analysis and policy development on a range of public interest matters.	
Judith Tanya Wheeldon	For service to secondary education, particularly as Headmistress of Abbotsleigh, and through professional organisations.	
Dr Noela Catherine Whitby	For service to medicine through contributions to professional medical organisations and programs promoting quality standards in health care, and to the community.	
Ian Mills Williams	For service to transport through contributions to the improvement of international maritime safety, and to professional organisations.	
Kimberley Lynton Williams	For service to arts administration through executive roles with a range of cultural organisations, to music education and the formulation of arts related public policy.	
Paul Stanley Wright	For service to medical administration, particularly through the Queensland Institute of Medical Research, and to business and commerce.	
Rosemary Ann Young	For service to the community, particularly in rural, regional and remote areas, through Frontier Services, an outreach program of the Uniting Church in Australia.	
Professor John Vincent Yovich	For service to tertiary education, particularly through Murdoch University, to veterinary science and equine medicine, and to the community.	
Gregory John Yurisich	For service to the performing arts as an operatic baritone and to the education and mentoring of young singers.	

==== Military Division ====
Branch	Recipient	Citation	Notes
Navy	Commodore Stephen Richard Gilmore	For exceptional service to the Australian Defence Force, particularly in very complex and dynamic maritime environments, and as the Commander of coalition maritime forces in the Northern	
Navy	Rear Admiral Ronald Maxwell Hancock	For exceptional service to the Royal Australian Navy as Director-General Coastwatch and Deputy Chief of Navy.	
Army	Colonel Anthony James Cotton	For exceptional performance in the role of the Director of Mental Health where he established and implemented the Australian Defence Force Mental Health Strategy.	
Army	Lieutenant Colonel Adam George Findlay	For exceptional performance as the Commanding Officer 3rd Battalion, The Royal Australian Regiment (Parachute).	
Army	Colonel Dougall McMillan	For exceptional service to the Australian Defence Force in the area of international policy, particularly as Head of the Australian Defence Staff, Papua New Guinea.	
Army	Major General Brian Ashley Power	For exceptional service to the Australian Defence Force as Defence Attaché Thailand, Commander 1st Brigade, and as Director United States Central Command Combined Planning Group, Tampa.	
Army	Lieutenant Colonel Georgeina Mary Whelan	For exceptional performance of duty to the Australian Defence Force in the area of health support, particularly as the Commanding Officer of the ANZAC Field Hospital, Operation Sumatra Assist.	
Army	Brigadier Nicholas Allan Williams	For exceptional service to the Australian Army, performing the duties of Commander 9th Brigade and Director Army Personnel Agency Adelaide.	
Air Force	Group Captain Calvert Loch Mitchell	For exceptional service to Air Force Personnel and as Deputy Commandant, Australian Defence Force Academy.	
Air Force	Air Commodore Kevin John Paule	For exceptional performance of duty as the Director General Joint Operations and Plans in Strategic Operations Division.	

=== Medal (OAM) ===
==== General Division ====
Recipient	Citation	Notes
Joseph Aarons	For service to the Jewish community through the Maccabi movement.	
John Henry Absalom	For service to the visual arts as a painter, and to the community through fundraising for a range of charitable organisations.	
Russell Alan Ainley	For service to the forest industry through the Forest Products Association of New South Wales.	
Gregory Arthur Allum	For service to surf lifesaving through administrative roles and as a coach, official and competitor.	
Dalia Antanaitis	For service to the Lithuanian community, particularly through dance.	
Dr John Frederick Arvier	For service to oral and maxillofacial surgery, particularly through the provision of services and training in developing countries.	
Judith Ann Ashford	For service to the community through the Parkinson's Society of the Gold Coast.	
Jim Asimakopoulos	For service to people with disabilities as an advocate, through raising public awareness and promoting the benefits of integrated education in the community.	
Denis Gerard Baker	For service to the community through developing strategies to assist people to obtain and maintain employment and through a range of sporting organisations.	
Dorothy May Balcomb	For service to education as a teacher and counsellor, and to the community through a range of historical, youth and charitable organisations.	
Peter Alfred Bancroft	For service to business, particularly to the restaurant and catering industry.	
Faye Jeanette Barrow	For service to people with disabilities and to their families, particularly through Bayley House.	
Brian Joseph Barry	For service to the wine industry, particularly as a winemaker and judge.	
Francis Paul Bartoli	For service to sport for people with vision impairments as a competitor and through a range of executive roles.	
Harald Lutz Basedow	For service to the community of Tolmie through sporting, rural fire and civic organisations.	
Claude Basile	For service to the fishing industry and to the community through fundraising activities.	
Patrick Joseph Bastic	For service to the community through a range of ex-service, political, health, welfare and sporting groups.	
Kenneth Eli Baxter	For service to Australian Rules football, particularly through the Western Australian Country Football League, and to the community of Cunderdin.	
Armour Ann Beardsley	For service to the community of Mortlake through a range of fundraising, cultural, and civic organisations.	
Raymond Douglas Beattie	For service to sport, particularly Rugby League football, to the film industry, and to the community through Celtic heritage organisations.	
Marion Frances Beelitz	For service to the community of Geranium and district through sporting, rural, religious and educational organisations.	
Dr Charles Brian Belcher	For service to the resources industry, particularly through scientific research and development, to international trade, and to education.	
Jonathan Albin Bell	For service to the community through a range of children's, sporting, rural and ex-service welfare organisations, and to the law.	
Helen Theresa Bielenberg	For service to the community in the area of chaplaincy services, particularly through the Military Christian Fellowship of Australia.	
Robert John Biggs	For service to people with disabilities through Assistance Dogs Australia.	
Hannie Biggs	For service to people with disabilities through Assistance Dogs Australia.	
James Godfrey Bisset	For service to the community of Hay through a range of local government, civic, sporting and youth organisations.	
Dr James Muir Blaikie	For service to the community of Toowoomba as a general practitioner and through a range of sporting, school and service organisations.	
Lance John Blood	For service to the community, particularly through aged care and health organisations.	
Malcolm Charles Bloomfield	For service to the community of Surry Hills through the programs of Anglicare.	
John Clouston Bond	For service to the community through the activities of the National Sorry Day Committee.	
Richard George Bowden	For service to local government and to the community of the Central Highlands through a range of primary industry and conservation groups.	
Kerry Donald Bowerman	For service to the community of southern Tasmania through involvement in church, aged care, service, sporting and charitable organisations.	
Lily Edith Bowman	For service to the community, particularly through the Oakleigh Churches of Christ Opportunity Shop.	
Julie Patricia Brackenreg	For service to youth through the Girls' Brigade movement.	
The Honourable Ian Maxwell Braid	For service to local government and to the Tasmanian Parliament.	
Helen Josephine Briggs	For service to the community, particularly as a contributor to the development of disability and respite care services in the Australian Capital Territory.	
Patricia Ann Britten	For service to the community, particularly through community housing programs in the Shepparton region.	
William Henry Broadbridge	For service to public administration and to the community through charitable and civic organisations.	
John David Brockhoff	For service to Rugby Union football as a player, coach, administrator and mentor.	
Keith Vernon Brown	For service to the community through the St Vincent de Paul Society.	
Ronald Henry Brown	For service to the ex-service community, particularly through the New South Wales Branch of the National Servicemen's Association of Australia.	
Dr Peter Damian Brukner	For service to sports medicine, particularly through the Australasian College of Sports Physicians, and as a medical adviser for sporting organisations.	
Michele Walter Brunsden	For service to music as a performer, teacher and conductor of student ensembles.	
Gary Francis Bugden	For service to the law, particularly through the practice and advancement of legislation relating to strata and community titles schemes, and to the community.	
Garry Royd Burgoyne	For service to the welfare of veterans and their families, particularly through the Korean and South East Asia Veterans Association.	
Julian Andre Burton	For service to the community through the Julian Burton Burns Trust.	
Milton Roy Buttsworth	For service to the dairy industry, to the agricultural show movement and to the community of Taree.	
Barbara Mary Byrne	For service to the community of the Australian Capital Territory through business, sporting and cultural organisations.	
Peter John Byrne	For service to the community, particularly through the Australian Red Cross Blood Service, and to the finance sector.	
Peter Joseph Byrne	For service to the community, particularly to veterans and their families through the Returned and Services League of Australia.	
The Reverend George Capsis	For service to the community through the Community Outreach Ministries of the Baptist Union of Australia.	
Lillian Joy Cardie	For service to the community, particularly through the Guiding movement, and through service and charitable organisations in the City of Redcliffe.	
Douglas Keith Carpenter	For service to the New South Wales and Western Australian Parliaments and to people with intellectual disabilities.	
John Charles Carrick	For service to the community through Rotary International, particularly in the areas of health promotion, youth affairs and international relations.	
John Lewis Cartmill	For service to community broadcasting, particularly through Family Radio and Christian Voice Radio.	
The Honourable Eric James Charlton	For service to the Western Australian Parliament, particularly through the reformation of the transport system and contributions to the Roadwise project.	
Eric Ning Chen	For service to the Chinese community of Victoria, particularly through the Box Hill Chinese Senior Citizen's Club and the Nunawading Community Hostel.	
Thomas Cheong	For service to the community through contribution to the commemoration of the service of Chinese Australian veterans.	
Peter George Christian	For service to the preservation of Australian history, particularly through the Fellowship of First Fleeters, and to the community.	
Julie Anne Christiansen	For service to the community through music, particularly the development of children's and youth choirs.	
Bruce William Church	For service to the community of Broken Hill, particularly as Chairman of the Agfair Agricultural Field Days.	
Dr Catherine Ann Clement	For service to the community through the recording and preservation of the history and heritage of the Kimberley region.	
Elaine Constance Clements	For service to the community of Cowra through aged care, medical support and welfare organisations.	
Marjory Mary Cockburn	For service to the community of Cairns through the Lifeline Community Service and through a range of women's, educational and art organisations.	
Dr Brian Sidney Cole	For service to medicine as a general practitioner in the northern Brisbane area, and through the development of palliative care services.	
Edward Patrick Colless	For service to the cattle industry and to the community of Walgett.	
Joan Rosalind Connery	For service to homeless youth through Stepping Stone House, Dulwich Hill.	
Donald Patrick Connolly	For service to the community through youth, aged welfare, service and health organisations.	
Graham Robert Costello	For service to the community of Taree, particularly though the Manning Valley Harness Racing Club.	
Patricia Clare Costello	For service to the community of Taree, particularly through the Manning Valley Harness Racing Club.	
Thomas Eton Costigan	For service to local government and to the community of Beenleigh.	
Mary Cramp	For service to the community of Tamworth, particularly through the Tamworth and District War Widows Guild.	
John William Crooks	For service to the community, particularly through the Mission Beach Surf Life Saving Club.	
William Ashley Crothers	For service to the community of Bourke, particularly through the Anglican Church of Australia, and to the pharmaceutical profession.	
Hilda Winifred Crowther	For service to the community, particularly through the Atherton Division of the Queensland Country Women's Association.	
John Francis Cullen	For service to veterans and their families through the Returned and Services League of Australia.	
Marion Fay Cumming	For service to people with visual impairments, particularly through the provision of audio resources, and to people in developing countries through the Orthopaedic Outreach Fund.	
Alistair George Cunningham	For service to swimming, particularly through the Liverpool City Amateur Swimming Club and the Cumberland Swimming Association.	
Kenneth Roy Curran	For service to the community, particularly through pipe bands and aged care organisations, and to a range of military and law enforcement authorities as an instructor.	
Stephen John Daley	For service to the community through organisations providing care, support and rehabilitation for people with disabilities and their carers, and to a range of sporting groups.	
Geoffrey Charles Davey	For service to local government, particularly through the Baw Baw Shire Council, and to the community of Warragul.	
Leslie Thomas Davey	For service to the community of Kiama through a range of heritage, environment and service organisations, and to local government.	
Mary Catherine Davies	For service to the community of north west Tasmania, particularly through organisations providing support services to people with Alzheimers disease and dementia and to their carers.	
Ivo Atkyns Dean	For service to agricultural education through the Marcus Oldham College and Foundation, and to the community.	
Jack Denham	For service to the Australian horse racing industry as a trainer and as a mentor to apprentice jockeys.	
Henry Charles Denyer	For service to the community of Collarenebri through a range of health and emergency services organisations.	
Barry George Dickinson	For service to the community through support for Lifeline Macarthur, charitable, health and sporting organisations.	
Loc Phu Doan	For service to the Vietnamese community in South Australia.	
Valerie Joan Dobeli	For service to netball as a manager, coach, umpire and player.	
Douglas Norman Dohle	For service to the community, particularly through the Pine Rivers Pony Club.	
Gwendoline Dohle	For service to the community, particularly through the Pine Rivers Pony Club.	
Ruth Gwendoline Donaldson	For service to the community through ex-service, heritage, historical and church groups.	
Alastair Stephen Douglas	For service to yachting, particularly through the Australian Three Peaks Race, and to marine safety in Tasmania.	
Patrice Moya Dow	For service to the community, particularly through the Ex-Women's Royal Australian Naval Service Association.	
Jaroslav Roman Duma	For service to the Ukrainian community of New South Wales and to the credit union movement.	
Harold George Durrant	For service to the community of Werris Creek through historical, service and health organisations, and to the Scouting movement.	
Robert Peter Easton	For service to cricket as a player, administrator and umpire.	
Councillor Winifred Jean Edwards	For service to local government and to the community of Geraldton through agricultural, historical, welfare and charitable organisations.	
Barry Roy Ehrke	For service to the fishing industry through contributions to developing and managing fisheries, stocks and promoting industry sustainability.	
Joan Mary Eiszele	For service to the community through providing assistance to refugees settling in the Hobart area.	
Jack Ellis	For service to the community of Onkaparinga, particularly through the programs and activities of the organisation 'The Shed'.	
James Robert Elms	For service to the community of Albany through musical, church and sporting organisations.	
Murray Adam Elphinstone	For service to the community through organisations supporting senior citizens, the agricultural show movement, rural fire service and local government.	
Daisy Lilian Elsum	For service to the community as a fundraiser for Geelong Hospice Care and Vision Australia.	
Frederick Russell Elsum	For service to the community as a fundraiser for Geelong Hospice Care and Vision Australia.	
Eric Lloyd Evans	For service to the community through fundraising activities for the establishment of war memorials and commemorative plaques.	
Stewart Fraser Ewen	For service to the community, particularly through the Cure Cancer Australia Foundation.	
Anne Denise Farrell	For service to nursing and to the community of Maclean.	
Alwyn Boldery Fielding	For service to the community of Chermside through aged care, health and welfare organisations.	
John Ernest Fisher	For service to the community through youth, educational, and health organisations.	
Mavis Joan Fisher	For service to children with hearing impairments as an educational audiologist.	
Dr John Henry Flak	For service to education, particularly as a contributor to the development of tertiary educational opportunities in western Sydney.	
Warwick Trotman Foote	For service to the recording and preservation of Australia's maritime history through the Queensland Maritime Museum.	
Carolyn June Forster	For service to the community of Canberra through children's medical research, historical, cultural and educational organisations.	
William Arthur Foster	For service to the welfare of ex-servicemen and women and their families and to the community of Berowra.	
Antoinette June Fox	For service to the community through the Guilford Young Grove Retirement Village.	
Ailene Molly Frampton	For service to the community through the organisation Court Network.	
Malcolm Lindsay Freake	For service to the community as a promoter of healthy life programs and as a contributor to business and sporting organisations.	
Andrew Cambridge Fulton	For service to the community of Hall as a volunteer with the rural fire service.	
Anthony John Fulton	For service to sports administration through TasSport, the Olympic and Commonwealth Games movement and basketball.	
The Reverend Alan David Galt	For service to the community through providing chaplaincy services to people with a mental illness and providing pastoral education programs.	
Lyall Robert Gardner	For service to cricket as a player and administrator at junior and senior levels.	
Reginald Seymour Gee	For service to local government, to engineering and to the community of Taroona.	
Lieutenant Commander Huw Gerald Gethin-Jones	For service to veterans, particularly through the Submarines Association of Australia, and to the community.	
Sabatino Gianforte	For service to the community of Marysville as a contributor to the management of public utilities, and to aged care and sporting organisations.	
Neville James Gibbons	For service to the preservation of Australian military history through the establishment of the Gippsland Armed Forces Museum, and to veterans in the community of Sale.	
Keith Ray Giddings	For service to veterans through the Royal Australian Navy Corvettes Association.	
Joyce Wilhelmina Gilbert	For service to animal welfare and protection, particularly in the Noosa-Sunshine Coast area.	
William Howard Gill	For service to the community of South Australia as a Justice of the Peace and through the correctional service system.	
Anthony William Gillam	For service to veterans and their families, particularly through the Moonah Sub-Branch of the Naval Association of Australia.	
Doreen Gillespie	For service to the community through the activities of the Wellers Hill - Tarragindi Uniting Church.	
Gilbert Girke	For service to the community, particularly as a fundraiser for organisations supporting people with visual and hearing impairments.	
Sister Maureen Gloria Gleeson	For service to hospital and health care administration in New South Wales and through contributions to the development of the Mercy Family Health Service in Lima, Peru.	
Henry Gold	For service to wilderness preservation through the use of photographic documentation.	
Beryl May Gooding	For service to nursing, particularly through the implementation of workplace occupational health and safety programs.	
John Robert Gorman	For service to the Australian hide, skin and leather export industry, and to the community.	
Betty Ann Gransbury	For service to the community through providing assistance to charitable, aged care and church organisations.	
William Grant	For service to the community and to the law through the New South Wales Legal Aid Commission.	
Gwenda Margaret Gray	For service to youth through the Scouting movement, and to the community of Beechworth.	
Loma June Graydon	For service to the community through fundraising and promotional activities for the Leukaemia Foundation of New South Wales.	
Michael William Grayson	For service to the community through the Iwasaki Foundation.	
Myrna Agnes Grose	For service to the community, through Christian radio broadcasting.	
Ian George Guiver	For service to the Olympic movement and to the community.	
Kurt Johann Hacker	For service to industry as a silverware manufacturer, and to the community, particularly through cultural and service organisations.	
Ann McLennan Haines	For service to the community of Hahndorf through cultural, heritage and civic beautification activities.	
Mabel Frances Hale	For service to early childhood education and through youth and church programs in the Nillumbik area.	
Madeline Ellen Halpin	For service to the community of Bellingen through church, health, agricultural show and welfare organisations.	
Lola Margaret Hardwick	For service to the community of Mosman, particularly through the Uniting Church in Australia.	
Alfred Ernest Harley	For service to the Illawarra community through a range of service organisations and to youth through the Scouting movement.	
Dr Chandrabhanu Haroon	For service to Indian classical dance and the promotion of multicultural arts.	
Susan Margaret Harper	For service to children, particularly through the organisation OMEP Australia.	
William James Harrigan	For service to Rugby League football, and to the community through administrative roles in sporting organisations.	
Esther May Harris	For service to the community through advocacy for children and adults with intellectual disabilities and their families.	
Francis Charles Harris	For service to the community through executive roles in the disability and crisis support services sectors.	
Geoffrey John Harvey	For service to the community as a musician and entertainer, and through support for charitable organisations.	
Pamela Harvey	For service to the community of Glenorchy through intercultural, aged care, school and youth organisations.	
William Donald Harvey	For service to recreational fishing in New South Wales through executive roles in sportfishing organisations at local, state and national levels.	
James Philip Hayes	For service to youth through secondary school sports associations and to the community of the Tumut Shire.	
Dorothy Lorraine Hays	For services to the community of the Coffs Harbour area, particularly through palliative and health care services.	
Peter Commander Hayward	For service to the community of Camden through a range of church, historical and business organisations.	
Rex Gerald Heading	For service to the television industry as a producer and director, and as a creator of children's television programs and characters.	
Margaret Ellen Heffernan	For service to the community in the area of women's health, particularly gynaecological cancer, and through cultural organisations.	
Isobel Hennessy	For service to the community as a foster parent.	
Yvonne Joy Henry	For service to the community, particularly to children as a swimming instructor for the Asthma Foundation of NSW.	
Reuven Shlome Herzog	For service to the Jewish community of Melbourne, particularly through Chevra Hatzolah.	
Gabrielle Anne Hewison	For service to the community, particularly through the provision of information and resources on issues affecting women, and through support for emerging authors.	
William Frank Heydon	For service to the community, particularly through Lions Australia.	
Antony Higginbottom	For service to the community through the Royal District Nursing Service of South Australia and Rotary International.	
Joan Marion Hiller	For service to the community through environmental protection, refugee assistance activities, and to the sport of orienteering.	
Kevin Richard Hincks	For service to the community of Swansea through church, service, business and school organisations.	
Fay Joan Hird	For service to the community, particularly to the widows and families of ex-service personnel.	
Alan Magill Hockey	For service to primary industry in the areas of cereal cropping and land care, and to the community of the Parkes district, particularly through the agricultural show society movement.	
Kevin William Hocking	For service to music as a composer, arranger, conductor and pianist.	
Major Austin John Hogan	For service to the community through the National Trust of Queensland.	
Grahame Walter Holstein	For service to the community of Gloucester through charitable, social welfare, church and ex-service organisations.	
Patrick Charles Hope	For service to the community of Ballarat through a range of tourism and heritage organisations.	
Thomas Gerald Hough	For service to the community of the Victor Harbor region, particularly through environmental organisations, and to local government.	
John James Howarth	For service to children with cancer and their families through Camp Quality in Forbes.	
David Thomas Howells	For service to amputees, particularly in the areas of patient support and prosthetics manufacture, and to the profession through voluntary clinical and training roles.	
Margaret Catherine Humphreys	For service to the community through the Australian Red Cross and the Cancer Council of Victoria.	
Allen Jack Hurst	For service to golf and lawn bowls in South Australia as a competitor and through administrative roles.	
Margaret Grace Hutchison	For service to nursing through the Nurses Christian Fellowship Australia.	
Dr Robert Ronald Hutchison	For service to medicine as a general practitioner in the Northampton area and through the provision of clinical education for health care professionals and students.	
Dr Patrick George Iland	For service to the wine industry through research, writing and the teaching of viticulture and oenology.	
Dr Christopher Brian Ingall	For service to medicine as a paediatrician and through clinical training roles, and as founder of the Northern Rivers Children's Health Fund.	
Alexander Thomas Irvine	For service to the building industry, to apprenticeship training programs, and to the community of the Rockhampton region through church, health and aged care organisations.	
Phillip Daryl Isaacs	For service to civil engineering, particularly in the area of environmentally sustainable building design and construction, and to the arts through opera.	
Colin John Jackson	For service to the community, particularly through organisations providing assistance to people with visual and hearing impairments.	
Ann Jarvis	For service to the dairying industry, to women in the agriculture sector, to education in regional Victoria, and to the community of the Kiewa Valley.	
Janice Gail Jenkin	For service to wildlife preservation through the Southern Oceans Seabird Study Association.	
Dr Malcolm Semple John	For service to the community of Geelong through music as an educator, composer, performer and conductor.	
Kaye Maree Johnson	For service to youth through the Guiding movement and to TAFE Tasmania as a teacher.	
Warren Frederick Johnson	For service to the community of the Kimberley region, particularly through Rotary International.	
Melville William Johnson	For service to cricket as an umpire, particularly in relation to improving the standards of umpiring through development programs for junior players in Queensland.	
Rex Winfred Johnston	For service to lawn bowls as a competitor and through the promotion of the sport.	
Arthur Bruce Jolly	For service to cricket in South Australia and to Australian Rules football.	
Allan Jones	For service to education in the western Sydney area, particularly through initiatives to enhance student achievement and staff development, and as a supporter of community education programs.	
The Right Reverend Dr Arthur Lucas Jones	For service to the Anglican Church of Australia and as a theology and language lecturer in developing countries.	
Dr Ewan Charles Jones	For service to the community of Ballarat, particularly through architectural contributions to the development of the Sovereign Hill complex and the Gold Museum, and through efforts to preserve the heritage and ambience of the town.	
Mark James Jones	For service to the community of Oatlands through health, social welfare and sporting organisations.	
Phillip Doward Jones	For service to the community through the Wimmera Mallee Rail Service Association, and to the Uniting Church in Australia.	
Shirley Grace Jones	For service to the community through the establishment of and continued support for Jessie Street National Women's Library.	
Kerry Ann Jordan	For service to youth through the Girls' Brigade, and to the community of Leura.	
Colleen Mary Kaatz	For service to the community of the Redbank area, particularly through Lions Australia.	
Rachel Kalman	For service to the Jewish community through the Joseph Giligich Foundation, the 'Kadimah' and the AJAX Amateur Football Club.	
Jane Karkadoo	For service to the Indigenous community of Doomadgee through contributions in the areas of social justice, employment and issues affecting women.	
Dr Robert John Kearney	For service to the community, particularly through the provision of specialist medical services in Australia, the Pacific region and East Timor, and to medicine as an ophthalmologist.	
Peter Barry Kearns	For service to education, particularly as an advocate for vocational education and training and life-long learning.	
Anthony Bruce Keech	For service to veterans and their families through the 7th Battalion Royal Australian Regiment Association.	
Victor John Kelleher	For service to the community, particularly through fundraising activities for the Children's Hospital Westmead and through sporting organisations.	
Patricia Mary Keller	For service to the community, particularly through programs initiated at the Narrabundah Primary School, and to education.	
Bryan James Kennedy	For service to the communities of Crookwell and Goulburn, particularly through the St Vincent de Paul Society.	
Hayden Leonard Kenny	For service to surf lifesaving and to the community, particularly through the Sunshine Coast Helicopter Rescue Service.	
Roger Andrew King	For service to the community as a director and instigator of multicultural music events.	
Ian Stanley Knight	For service to the community of the City of Wyndham, particularly through aged care services and Rotary International.	
E Rifka Knox	For service to the community through the organisation Knitters for Melbourne's Needy Inc.	
Stephen Kelvin Knox	For service to the community, particularly as a fundraiser for the Royal Flying Doctor Service through the Outback Car Trek, and to motor sports.	
Elizabeth Jane Koch	For service to music education as a teacher of flute and as a mentor to young musicians.	
Alfredo-George Kouris	For service to the community through contributions to the business sector, raising public awareness of the issues facing migrants, and to the Greek community.	
Gerhard Georg Krain	For service to the community of the Albury district through health, welfare and landcare organisations, and to the Lutheran Church in New South Wales.	
Dr Surendranath Krishnan	For service to medicine as a head and neck surgeon, and to the communities of Papua New Guinea and Pacific Island nations through Rotary International.	
Vincenzo La Cava	For service to the building and construction industry, and to the community through business and charitable organisations.	
Dr Francis Houstoun Lang	For service to medicine, particularly in the field of otorhinolaryngology, and to the Army Reserve.	
Edyth McWilliam Langham-Goodwin	For service to business and commerce, particularly through promoting the role of women, to canine and equestrian sports, and to the community.	
Janeanne Dawn Lee	For service to youth through the Guiding movement.	
Frederick William Lenthall	For service to amateur boxing in Australia and the Pacific Islands, particularly as a coach.	
Rosie Linakis	For service to the community, particularly through contributions to Australia's participation in military commemorations in Crete, and to Australian veterans.	
Marie Therese Little	For service to people with disabilities through activities supporting participation in competitive sporting events.	
The Reverend Dr Paul Gibson Logan	For service to the Presbyterian Church of Australia, particularly in the areas of aged care and social welfare.	
Edward George London	For service to lawn bowls as a competitor and administrator.	
Bede Alphonsus Long	For service to the community through Lions Australia.	
Linda Lovelee	For service to the community of Narrabri through a range of social, aged care and welfare organisations.	
Gordon Andrew Lowrie	For service to junior Rugby League football in New South Wales, particularly in the St George area.	
Daphne Constance Lussick	For service to the community of Miling through a range of sporting, charitable, agricultural and women's organisations.	
Geoffrey Thomas Lynch	For service to youth as a contributor to the development of school and community-based bands in the Hunter region, particularly the Marching Koalas.	
Veronica Norah Macaulay-Cross	For service to the community as an advocate for women with advanced breast cancer, and to education.	
Dr Mikael Conway Macdougall	For service to the community of Cobram as a general practitioner.	
James Frederick Mackie	For service to Australian Rules football in the Gold Coast region as an umpire and through a range of administrative roles.	
Richard Thomas MacNevin	For service to the community of Rockhampton through a range of organisations, particularly in the fields of tourism and vocational education.	
Margaret Marion MacRae	For service to the community as a volunteer for health care organisations, particularly through support for cancer patients and their families.	
The Reverend Father Thomas Gregory Maloney	For service to the Catholic Church and to the community of Lismore as Chaplain to health and aged care organisations.	
Carol-Ann Mary Malouf	For service to the community of Condobolin through agricultural show, health, youth and sporting organisations, and to primary industry.	
Christine Mary Manderson	For service to people with cancer and to their families, particularly through establishing patient support groups and preparing information material, and as a radiation therapist.	
Claudine Beulah Manea	For service to the community of Bunbury through conservation, health, welfare and sporting organisations.	
John James Mangan-Miller	For service to the culinary industry, particularly through hospitality education and training roles, and as a chef.	
The Reverend Canon Alexander Neil Marshall	For service to the Anglican Church of Australia, particularly through support for parish projects, and to the community of Wynnum.	
Professor Graham Martin	For service to psychiatry through the development of clinical services for children and adolescents, as a teacher, and through research activities in the area of youth suicide.	
Kenneth Lawrence Marvell	For service to the community through a range of ex-service, social, and aged care organisations.	
Stella Maisie Massey	For service to the community of Cairns, particularly through the establishment and direction of the Cairns String Orchestra.	
William Edmund Matheson	For service to the environment, particularly in the areas of soil, water and biodiversity conservation.	
Marjory Carol Matison	For service to local government and to the community of the City of Gosnells.	
Frank Cebria Matons	For service to veterans and their families on the Mornington Peninsula, particularly through the Returned and Services League of Australia and the Vietnam Veterans Association.	
Thomas Francis Matters	For service to the community, particularly through the fundraising activities of the South Australian Branch of Variety, The Children's Charity.	
Eletha Anne Matters	For service to the community, particularly through the fundraising activities of the South Australian Branch of Variety, The Children's Charity.	
Kenneth Charles Mawson	For service to the quarrying industry, particularly through the establishment of extractive industry training resources and programs, and to the community of Cohuna.	
Brother Dr Francis Irenaeus McCarthy	For service to education through the Christian Brothers order, particularly St Kevin's College, Toorak.	
Sydney Charles McClymont	For service to the community through Rotary International and Targa Tasmania, and to the Tasmanian Police Service.	
Julie Maree McDonald	For service to swimming, to the Olympic movement, and to the community as a fundraiser for charitable organisations.	
Michael Robert McEntyre	For service to secondary education in rural New South Wales and to school sport through Rugby League coaching and administrative roles.	
Professor John Kerridge McGeachie	For service to dental education, particularly through the development of programs for undergraduate and postgraduate students.	
Patricia Mary McGovern	For service to the credit union movement and to the community of Beaudesert through church, sporting and fundraising roles.	
Geoffrey David McGuire	For service to equestrian sport, particularly as a showjumping judge and course designer, and to the community.	
Archibald James McKellar	For service to the community through the development of a construction waste recycling industry and commitment to environmentally sustainable industrial practices.	
Michael William McKelvey	For service to science through the Pelican Lagoon Research and Wildlife Centre.	
Stanley Barry McKenzie	For service to the community of the Eyre Peninsula, particularly in the field of health administration, and through a range of sporting, school and church groups.	
Wendy Margaret McKeough	For service to the communities of the Taree and Manning River through local government, sporting and service organisations.	
Theresa Mary McKinnon	For service to the community of the City of Shoalhaven through a range of musical, school and show society organisations.	
David Bruce McKnight	For service to the community of Ballarat, particularly through contributions to the Sovereign Hill Museum complex, and to local government.	
Gavina Marie McLucas	For service to the community of Bundaberg as a Lifeline counsellor and musician.	
Associate Professor Marilyn McMurchie	For service to medicine as a general practitioner, particularly as an educator in the area of care for people living with HIV/AIDS, and as an advocate for women in medicine.	
Kathleen Ann McNeilly	For service to the community of the Redland Shire through cultural, service and welfare organisations, and to business.	
Mala Mehta	For service to the community through establishing the Hindi School, fostering interest in Indian culture and providing assistance to new migrants.	
Veryl Dorette Mellors	For service to the Indigenous community, particularly as a foster carer, and through nursing roles in Yuendumu and Alice Springs.	
Tempe Merewether	For service to the community through support for musical societies and the Australian Red Cross.	
Caroline Anketell Merrylees	For service to the communities of Hay and Carrathool as an archivist, author and fundraiser.	
Roger Cordt Meyer	For service to the community through the preservation and recording of Australian civil aviation history.	
Ann Christine Middleton	For service to the jewellery industry as a designer and manufacturer and through promoting the use of Australian gemstones, and to table tennis.	
Glen Millar	For service to Rugby Union football as a coach, player and office bearer, and to the community through local government.	
Gordon Charles Mitchell	For service to the Anglican Church of Australia through a variety of roles within the Diocese of Grafton, and to real estate as a land valuer.	
Janice Marie Mitchell	For service to tourism and to the community of Geelong as the artist responsible for the Baywalk Bollards project.	
Dr Peter Balfour Mitchell	For service to the community, particularly through promoting public awareness of the natural environment and contributing to the conservation and management of natural resources.	
Dr William Fredrick Mitchell	For service to dentistry as a practitioner and through the Australian Dental Association, and to the community of the Northern Territory.	
Allan David Moffatt	For service to veterans through the Royal Australian Navy Communications Branch Association.	
Dr Robert Hannay Moffitt	For service to medicine as a general practitioner, particularly to veterans and their families.	
Joseph David Moldrich	For service to the records management industry, particularly through the development of industry standards.	
William Francis Montague	For service to the fruit industry through the introduction of a range of innovations to improve the quality of market produce.	
Pamela Lynne Moore	For service to the community through the Country Women's Association of New South Wales.	
Rowan Richard Moore	For service to the dairy industry, and to the community of Camden through aged care, agricultural show and service organisations.	
Shirley Anon Moreland	For service to the community of Kenilworth, particularly through the Kenilworth Arts Council.	
Dorothy Gwenyth Morris	For service to the community of Maitland as a choir conductor and musical director.	
John Arthur Morris	For service to the welfare of veterans and their families.	
John William Morris	For service to the community, particularly through the Maitland Repertory Society, and to education.	
Gerald Henry Moses	For service to the Jewish community of Queensland, and to the community of the Gold Coast.	
Reginald Marven Mould	For service to the community of Shepparton through a range of educational, emergency services and charitable organisations.	
Andrew John Muir	For service to Rugby Union football through the development of the sport in country areas of Queensland, and to the community through contributions to the Scots PGC College, Warwick.	
Elspit Agnes Mulherin	For service to the community of Mackay through a range of cultural, social welfare, aged care and charitable organisations.	
Ivan John Muller	For service to the community of Tamworth as a fundraiser and supporter of charitable, sporting and youth organisations.	
Mary Susannah Muller	For service to the community, particularly through the New South Wales Women Justices' Association.	
Edward Anthony Mulligan	For service to the community of Guyra through sporting, agricultural and ex-service organisations.	
Cheryl Meree Munson	For service to tenpin bowling as a player and coach.	
Graeme John Murdoch	For service to local government and to the community of Altona.	
Michael John Murphy	For service to the community of regional Victoria, particularly through local government, water conservation and environmental organisations.	
Thomas James Murphy	For service to the sport of canoeing as an official and administrator.	
Dr Patrick Murray	For service to medicine as a physician and to the community of Toowoomba, particularly through service and historical groups.	
Winifred Mildred Murray	For service to the community of Cairns through the Australian Red Cross.	
Margaret Ruth Neldner	For service to the community through church, educational and craft organisations.	
Dr Warren Oscar Newman	For service to the community of Tamworth through research into and documentation of local history, and through educational organisations.	
Wendy Lorraine Nicholson	For service in the field of neonatal care as a proponent of the benefits of breastfeeding and through contributions to the establishment of the College of Lactation Consultants Victoria Inc and the Network of Australian Lactation Colleges.	
Anton Nieuwenhout	For service to veterans and their families through the Yarrawonga Mulwala Sub-Branch of the Returned and Services League of Australia, and to the community of Yarrawonga.	
Betty Doreen Nobes	For service to the community of the Southern Yorke Peninsula, particularly through health care organisations.	
George Michael Nolan	For service to the Irish community in Western Australia.	
William George Noonan	For service to the transport industry, particularly through the development of road safety programs, and to the trade union movement.	
Joan Mida O'Brien	For service as an advocate for women in the legal profession, and to the community through church and floral art groups.	
John Daniel O'Donoghue	For service to the arts as the author of contemporary Australian plays.	
Helen O'Keefe	For service to the community through promoting the mining industry.	
Kevin Francis O'Loughlin	For service to the community as a contributor to the development of teaching programs providing insight into Indigenous culture and through contributions to the reconciliation process.	
James Sydney O'Neill	For service to the community of Canberra as an honorary auditor and financial adviser to a range of church and charitable organisations.	
Maxwell Thomas O'Toole	For service to sport as an athletics coach, and as an instructor of community fitness groups.	
Faye Philomena Oakley	For service to the community of Tuross Head through church, aged care and emergency services organisations.	
Zipporah Oliver	For service to people with disabilities, and to the Jewish community of Melbourne.	
Dr Francis Septimus Owen	For service to the community of Newcastle through public speaking and charitable organisations.	
The Honourable Ernest Thomas Page	For service to the New South Wales Parliament and to local government through the Waverley Council.	
John Page	For service to veterans and their families through the Royal Australian Air Force Association.	
Genseric Parker	For service to the community of Gembrook through recording local history and through a range of civic, sporting, heritage and health groups.	
Dr Heather Mary Parker	For service to medicine as a general practitioner and as a contributor to professional organisations, and to aviation.	
Leslie William Parker	For service to the community of Rockhampton through surf lifesaving, agricultural and sporting organisations.	
Councillor Teasdale George Parker	For service to the community of Townsville through local government and a range of sporting organisations, and as a fundraiser for children with cancer.	
Rodney John Parsons	For service to the community of Wagga Wagga, and to accountancy in regional New South Wales.	
Desmond Reginald Paul	For service to athletics through a range of administrative roles with sporting organisations.	
Raymond Bruce Payne	For service to the welfare of ex-servicemen and women through a range of Vietnam veterans' support organisations.	
Patricia Ann Payne	For service to pharmacy, and to the community through fundraising for children's medical research.	
Dr Barry Clive Pearson	For service to medicine as a general practitioner, and to the community of Hurstville through aged care and service organisations.	
Ross Aubrey Pearson	For service to the community through museum and historical societies, and through sporting, ex-service, nature conservation and children's organisations.	
John Harold Pennington	For service to athletics, particularly in the area of long-distance running, as an administrator, coach and competitor.	
Darren Peter Penny	For service to the international community as a contributor to the development of paramedical services and hospital management of, and response to, disasters in Vanuatu.	
Desmond Joseph Pentreath	For service to the community of Lockington through a range of business, aged care, service and heritage organisations.	
Peter Carl Perry	For service to the community through health and youth organisations, and through Rotary International.	
Caroline Elizabeth Peschek	For service to people with disabilities through the activities of Cooma Challenge, and to the community through committee roles within the health sector.	
Margaret Olive Pestell	For service to equestrian sport, particularly through the Young Pony Club.	
Dianne Merlwyn Petrie	For service to the community through the Williams Syndrome Association of Australia and the Association of Genetic Support of Australasia.	
Peter Philippsohn	For service to the Jewish community, particularly as a contributor to the establishment and development of Mount Sinai College and through the Jewish Communal Appeal.	
Brian Phillips	For service to the performing arts in the area of musical theatre, particularly through Rockdale Opera.	
John Milton Pilcher	For service to the community of Inverell, particularly through Rotary International, and through agricultural show, recreational and sporting organisations.	
Ben Kurt Piper	For service to the community, particularly as a volunteer adviser to and administrator of local legal service organisations, and as a supporter of the activities of the Friends of Port Melbourne Foreshore.	
Dr Leslie Oswyn Poidevin	For service to medicine in the area of women's health.	
Laurel June Powell	For service to the community of Pambula through a range of aged care, health and church groups.	
Cheryl Joan Price	For service to the community through support for people with coeliac disease.	
Graham William Price	For service to the community through support for people with coeliac disease.	
Maxwell Simpson Prior	For service to the community of Jamestown through a range of health care, sporting and service organisations.	
William James Proffitt	For service to the community through the Wesley Heights Aged Care Facility.	
Barbara Stapleton Quigg	For service to the community, particularly through the Penrith Community Aid Association.	
Nicholas John Quigley	For service to the ex-service community, particularly through the Central Queensland Sub-Branch of the Vietnam Veterans Association of Australia.	
Emeritus Professor John Allen Ramsland	For service to the community, particularly through historical research in the areas of child poverty and abuse, the Indigenous experience and institutional life in colonial Australia, and to education.	
Donald Ransom	For service to the environment and to the community of South Australia, particularly through initiatives relating to recreational vehicle access to public lands.	
Shirley Ann Read	For service to gymnastics, particularly as a supervisor, coach and judge through Gymnastics New South Wales.	
Susan Lindsay Read	For service to education through support for local school communities, particularly as a leader of parent groups.	
Ernest Frank Redman	For service to the community as a supporter of school student tours to the Burma Thailand Railway prisoner of war memorial, and to the ex-service community through the Esperance Sub-Branch of the Returned and Services League of Australia.	
Anthony William Redstone	For service to the community through philanthropic contributions to children's, ex-service, health and customs service projects, particularly on Norfolk Island.	
Catherine Mary Reid	For service to people with disabilities, particularly as a contributor to the advancement of attendant care services to allow independent living.	
The Reverend Thomas Theodore Reuther	For service to the Lutheran Church of Australia, particularly in the areas of school education and aged care.	
Carolyn Ann Rice	For service to the community through the programs of Quota International.	
Colonel Peter George Richards	For service to the ex-service community, particularly through the Woden Valley Sub-Branch of the Returned and Services League of Australia.	
Thomas Charles Richardson	For service to the welfare of the veteran community of the North Shore, Sydney.	
Ann Margaret Rigbye	For service to the community of the Cooloola region through a range of social welfare, youth and health organisations.	
Ian Stuart Riseley	For service to the community, particularly through Rotary International.	
Dr Peggy Diane Rismiller	For service to science through the Pelican Lagoon Research and Wildlife Centre.	
The Reverend Henry Thomas Roberts	For service to the Uniting Church in Australia through the Georges River Presbytery Aged Care complex, providing hospital chaplaincy services and providing services for congregations without ministers.	
Helena Betty Robertson	For service to the community, particularly through the New South Wales Branch of the National Trust of Australia.	
Shirley Joan Robins	For service as a contributor to and supporter of the activities of ex-service organisations in Adelaide.	
Marjorie Robson	For service to the communities of Merimbula and Jindabyne through amateur musical theatre productions, fundraising for charitable causes, and through church and aged care groups.	
Elizabeth Johannah Rogers	For service to the community through contributions to the Friends of the State Library of South Australia, the Burnside Historical Society and Carrick Hill.	
Jan Ross	For service to the community of Richmond through school, aged care and sporting organisations, and through the Tasmanian Branch of the Australian Garden History Society.	
Mark Dattilo Rubbo	For service to the community through fostering an awareness of Australian literature as a bookseller, literary critic, and promoter and supporter of Australian writers.	
Michael Ashley Rutledge	For service to local government through the Hay Shire Council.	
Councillor Barry Edward Ryan	For service to local government through the Gloucester Shire Council and the Shires Association of New South Wales.	
The Reverend Father Gerald Paul Ryan	For service to the Catholic Church through pastoral roles in parishes in Victoria, and as an early contributor to the liturgical movement in the Archdiocese of Melbourne.	
David Franklin Sandoe	For service to community health through support for men diagnosed with prostate cancer and their families, and to the insurance industry.	
Pamela Kay Sandoe	For service to community health through support for men diagnosed with prostate cancer and their families through the Prostate Cancer Foundation of Australia.	
Dell Anne Saxby	For service to cancer patients and their families through the Rockhampton Branch of the Queensland Cancer Fund.	
Joan Mary Scanlan	For service to the community of Gumeracha, particularly through the Australian Red Cross.	
Frances Ellen Seen	For service to the community of Beaconsfield through the Uniting Church in Australia and through aged care, health and youth groups.	
Dr Melody Lynn Serena	For service to the environment through research and conservation of the biodiversity of Australian wildlife.	
Dr Maxwell Shavitsky	For service to the community as an advocate for reform in the areas of child health and child protection, and to medicine as a general practitioner.	
Patricia Anne Shaw	For service to primary education in New South Wales through encouraging student participation in learning extension programs and fostering school involvement in the wider community.	
Norma Evelyn Shelley	For service to the community of south-western Sydney, particularly through contributions to the Gandangara Local Aboriginal Land Council, to the University of the Third Age movement, and to female Justices of the Peace.	
Mark Douglas Shephard	For service to public health through medical research, to the environment through conservation organisations, and to aviculture.	
Libby Silva	For service to the community through the provision of information and resources on issues affecting women and to Australian literature through the support and promotion of the work of female writers.	
Edward Israel Simmons	For service to soccer, athletics and tenpin bowling as a referee, announcer, coach and journalist.	
Gilbert Stewart Simmons	For service to the welfare of veterans and their families and to the community.	
David George Skinner	For service to the community, particularly through Lions Australia, and through the provision of pro bono legal services to sporting and aged care groups.	
Fredrick Jack Slatter	For service to the dairy industry through herd improvement programs, and to agricultural show societies as a judge and steward.	
Sister Marie Therese Slattery	For service to the community in the Catholic Diocese of Bathurst, particularly as a Sister of St Joseph.	
Francis John Smith	For service to local government through the Cootamundra Shire Council, and to the community through health, school and sporting organisations.	
Maureen Anne Smith	For service to the community of Ulverstone through women's, school, social, cultural and health groups.	
Maurice Wilton Smith	For service to the community of Auburn through ex-service, aged care, service and church organisations.	
Keith Oswald Snell	For service to equestrian sports as a judge, chief marshal, steward and ringmaster, particularly at the Royal Bathurst Show.	
June Polly Southwell	For service to the community through the Country Women's Association of New South Wales.	
Alfred Sidney Sparkes	For service to the Returned and Services League of Australia, particularly through the delivery of school education programs, and to swimming as a volunteer official for the St George/Sutherland District Swimming Association.	
Peter Crawford Spurgin	For service to the community of south-east Queensland as a rescue and medical retrieval pilot.	
Alan Robert Stanborough	For service to veterans and their families through the Maclean Sub-Branch of the Returned and Services League of Australia.	
Russell Stewart Starke	For service to the visual arts through promoting the work of emerging artists, and to the community through participation in charity art exhibitions.	
Sister Patricia Marie Staunton	For service to inmates and their families, staff and fellow chaplains through the New South Wales Department of Corrective Services Chaplaincy Service.	
Larry Stellar	For service to the entertainment industry, and to the community through voluntary performances at fundraising events for charitable organisations.	
Nancy Burdett Stephens	For service to the community of Flinders through church, sporting, environmental and health groups, and to local government.	
Catherine Stevenson	For service to the community of Mount Kembla through the preservation and celebration of local history and through organisations assisting people with visual impairments.	
Barbara Ann Stewart-Kann	For service to the Jewish community of the Gold Coast through a range of social welfare, women's, school and health organisations.	
Rodney Allen Stiff	For service to the aviation industry through the manufacture and export of aircraft engines and aviation instruments.	
James Thomas Stokie	For service to the community of Port Fairy through a range of sporting, ex-service and social organisations.	
Lois Marjorie Storer	For service to the communities of Brunswick Heads and Mullumbimby through service, school and agricultural show organisations.	
Dorothy Jean Strachan	For service to the community of Cohuna, particularly through the Cohuna and District Historical Society.	
Peter James Summers	For service to the community through the Defence Reserve Support Council, South Australia, through organisations promoting health and leisure activities, and to youth.	
Geoffrey Mendes Sussman	For service to pharmacy and to the multidisciplinary field of wound care as a clinician, researcher and educator, and to the sports of diving and gymnastics.	
Gary John Sutton	For service to the sport of cycling as a competitor and coach, particularly of junior cyclists.	
Mary Elizabeth Sweeney	For service to floral art as a designer and educator.	
Loris Vivienne Synan	For service to music as a vocal coach and through the Lieder Society of Victoria.	
Roy Raphael Tashi	For service to the Jewish community, particularly through a range of aged care, educational and cultural organisations.	
Malcolm Henry Taylor	For service to accountancy, and to the community through a range of rural sector, charitable and service organisations.	
Dr Robert Inglis Taylor	For service to veterinary science as a practitioner, and to the community through historical and service organisations.	
Dr Ralph ten Seldam	For service to medicine as a general practitioner and through involvement in training and continuing education programs.	
Pauline Rixson Thomas	For service to nursing, particularly through the development and implementation of renal dialysis services in the Nambour area.	
Peter James Thomas	For service to the community of Torquay, particularly through support for local health care organisations.	
John Cyril Thompson	For service to the welfare of veterans and their families through the Beenleigh Sub-Branch of the Returned and Services League of Australia and the Limbless Soldiers Association of Queensland.	
Neville Francis Toll	For service to the community of Gilgandra through a range of sporting and service groups.	
Janice Tolley	For service to literature, particularly through the development of creative writing courses for children.	
Domenico Totino	For service to the Italian community, particularly through promoting commerce and industry, and as a supporter of a range of charitable organisations.	
Janice Tottman	For service to the community through the Adelaide Zoo and Monarto Zoological Park.	
Helen Forbes Trotter	For service to the community of Box Hill, particularly through a range of aged care organisations.	
Colin Rae Tummon	For service to the honey and dairy industries.	
Sydney Lawrence Tyler	For service to veterans and their families through a range of ex-service organisations in northern Tasmania.	
Dr John Tziniolis	For service to the Greek community, particularly through the Athenian Association of Sydney and New South Wales.	
Eugenia Vallianos	For service to local government and the community of Cardwell Shire through a range of aged care, health and service organisations.	
Lionel Richard Van Dorssen	For service to the community of far north Queensland through a range of charitable, local government and industry groups.	
Judith Lillette Van Loenen	For service to the community of Tea Tree Gully, particularly through establishing recreation groups for older citizens and people with disabilities.	
Elizabeth Vandeleur	For service to the communities of Innisfail and Tully, particularly through researching, collating and recording local history.	
David George Vann	For service to business, to the community through a range of religious, cultural and educational organisations, and to vintage motor sport.	
Dr Ivo Dominic Vellar	For service to medicine as a surgeon, and to the Italian community, particularly through a range of organisations providing aged care services.	
Dr Geoffrey Stanley Vercoe	For service to medicine, particularly in the field of otolaryngology, and to Indigenous health in the Northern Territory.	
Mary Therese Virtue	For service to the community as a manager and presenter of multicultural music and media programs.	
David Alston Wallace	For service to the thoroughbred racing industry, particularly in regional New South Wales.	
Gregory Burnett Wallace	For service to local government in the Perry Shire, and to the community through a range of sporting and emergency services groups.	
Allan George Warby	For service to primary industry through the Royal National Agricultural and Industrial Association of Queensland, and to horse-racing in Surat and Dalby.	
John Vincent Ward	For service to the community, particularly through the establishment of the Balgownie School Heritage Museum.	
Robert Henry Waterson	For service to the community, particularly through the Epping Sub-Branch of the Returned and Services League of Australia.	
Lieutenant Colonel Charles Sinclair Watson	For service to youth through the Scouting movement, to the sport of rowing in New South Wales, and to the community.	
John Ross Watts	For service to the community through bicycle and road safety education programs for children.	
Dr Alan Kenneth Webb	For service to civil engineering and to the community of Ballarat through the management and development of educational and cultural facilities.	
Stanley Charles Webster	For service to youth through the Scouting movement, and to the community.	
Michael John Weissenfeld	For service to the community of Chelsea through a range of veterans' and sporting organisations.	
Ralph Wensley	For service to youth through the Scouting movement, particularly the pastoral care and development of young people.	
Alan Maxwell Whelan	For service to the community of Forrest through sporting, church and service organisations.	
Maxwell Bryan Whiddon	For service to people with intellectual disabilities, particularly through the Sunnyfield Association.	
Bryce H S Whitaker	For service to the community of Maryborough through the brass band movement.	
William Robert White	For service to the Presbyterian Church of Queensland, and to the community of Hervey Bay, particularly through Meals on Wheels.	
Peter Graham Whitford	For service to local government and the community of the Yankalilla District through civic, educational, service and church organisations, and to primary industry.	
Irene Ruth Whittle	For service to local government and to the community of Peterborough.	
Gwendoline Rose Wiggins	For service to the community of Sussex Inlet through a range of youth and sporting organisations.	
Audrey May Willcox	For service to the community of Penguin through ex-service and sporting organisations and Meals on Wheels.	
Elizabeth Mary Williams	For service to the community of Windellama through church and historical organisations and the rural fire service.	
George Robertson Williams	For service to the community through the University of the Third Age.	
Henry Walter Williams	For service to the communities of Benalla and Glenrowan, particularly through aged care services, and to the livestock industry.	
Voi Williams	For service to the arts through the support of cultural activities, particularly the 'Organs of the Ballarat Goldfields' festival, and to the community of Ballarat.	
Indigo Williams Willing	For service to the community through the establishment and administration of the Adopted Vietnamese International organisation.	
Nancy Jennifer Willis	For service to education as a teacher of chemistry, as an author and through promoting the study of science.	
William John Willis	For service to the sport of swimming as an administrator, selector and official.	
Sister Patricia Ellen Wilson	For service to education and to the community through providing educational opportunities for children and adults with learning difficulties.	
Shirley Ann Wilson	For service to the Gold Coast community, particularly through the Southport Branch of the Australian Red Cross.	
Dr Janis Kay Wilton	For service to the community as an historian, researcher and author, to history organisations, and through the preservation of Chinese heritage in New South Wales.	
Yuke Lan Woo	For service to the community through the Anglican Church of Australia and through a range of education and assistance programs for Chinese immigrants.	
Marjorie Brenda Wood	For service to the community through ex-service and aged care organisations.	
Carole Fay Woods	For service to the community of Fingal, particularly aged people and sports organisations.	
Myra Fay Woolley	For service to the community through SIDS and Kids Tasmania, and a range of organisations in the Claremont area.	
Terance George Woolley	For service to secondary education, to professional associations, and to the community.	
Philip James Wright	For service to the community, particularly through the Royal Association of Justices of Western Australia, and to engineering.	
Dianne Frances Wright-Smith	For service to the community as a foster parent and carer for children with disabilities and special medical needs.	
Allan William Yates	For service to the development of the shellfish industry in Tasmania.	
Fae Yeatman	For service to the community through women's, church and educational organisations, and through support for people receiving palliative care.	
June Eleanor Young	For service to audiology through contributions to developing diagnostic and clinical programs for babies and children.	
Kevin Max Young	For service to golf through planning, organising and administrative roles.	
Zara Young	For service to the Jewish community, particularly through the National Council of Jewish Women of Australia.	

==== Military Division ====
Branch	Recipient	Citation	Notes
Navy	Chief Petty Officer Paul Gerald Corcoran	For meritorious service to the Royal Australian Navy in the field of Marine Engineering as the Chief Petty Officer Artificer in HMAS Westralia.	
Navy	Lieutenant Commander Keith Neville Jonas	For meritorious service as the Staff Officer Minor Project Development at Maritime Headquarters.	
Navy	Lieutenant Commander James Michael McConnell	For meritorious service in the Royal Australian Navy in the field of communications and as Warrant Officer of the Navy.	
Navy	Lieutenant Commander Kenneth Douglas Norton	For meritorious service in the field of Anti-Submarine Warfare in the Royal Australian Navy in a distinguished career spanning 37 years.	
Navy	Chief Petty Officer John Bernard Ryan	For meritorious service to the Royal Australian Navy in the field of Naval Engineering.	
Army	Warrant Officer Class One James Stanley Armstrong	For meritorious service as the Regimental Sergeant Major of the 9th Force Support Battalion and the Army School of Transport and Ordnance.	
Army	Warrant Officer Class One William John Degenaro	For meritorious performance of duty as a Master Gunner, Regimental Sergeant Major, Soldier Career Adviser within the Royal Regiment of Australian Artillery, and Regimental Sergeant Major Ceremonial at Defence Headquarters.	
Army	Warrant Officer Class One Anthony James Dunne	For meritorious performance of duty as the Regimental Sergeant Major of the 4th/19th Prince of Wales Light Horse Regiment (Reconnaissance), the 2nd/14th Light Horse Regiment (Queensland Mounted Infantry) (Reconnaissance), the Multi-National Force and Observers-Sinai and the Soldier Career Management Agency.	
Army	Warrant Officer Class One Leanne Marie Iseppi	For meritorious service as the Regimental Sergeant Major of the 8th Signal Regiment and 1st Joint Support Unit.	
Army	Warrant Officer Class One Joseph James McIvor	For meritorious service as Company Sergeant Major and Regimental Sergeant Major of the 2nd Battalion, The Royal Australian Regiment and as the Regimental Sergeant Major of the 31st Battalion, the Royal Queensland Regiment.	
Army	Warrant Officer Class One Peter Anthony O'Connell	For meritorious service to the Australian Defence Force in the field of Explosive Ordnance Services and Training.	
Air Force	Squadron Leader Grant Michael Herrmann	For meritorious performance of duty as a Senior Maintenance Manager in Number¬†92 Wing and PC9/A Engineering Manager in Training Aircraft Systems Program Office.	
Air Force	Flight Lieutenant Gregory John Williams	For meritorious performance of duty in the field of the recovery of Australian military personnel killed in previous conflicts.	
