= Ponich =

Ponich is a surname. Notable people with the surname include:

- Marissa Ponich (born 1987), Canadian fencer
- Michael Ponich (1905–1957), Canadian politician

== See also ==
- Povich
