= Julie Campbell (vascular biologist) =

Australian vascular biologist

- Born: 2 November 1946 (age 80); Sydney
- Education: University of New South Wales (BSc); University of Melbourne (PhD)
- Known for: Smooth Muscle Biology, "Grow Your Own Arteries"
- Awards: Wellcome Australia Medal (1995); Fellow of the Australian Academy of Science (2000); Centenary Medal (2003); Queensland Greats Award (2004); Officer of the Order Of Australia (2006)
- Scientific career
- Fields: Vascular Biology
- Workplaces: University of Melbourne (1973-75); University College London (1976); University of Iowa (1977); University of Washington (1977-78); Baker Medical Research Institute (1978-91); Centre for Research in Vascular Biology (1991-Present); Australian Vascular Biology Society; National Health and Medical Research (1995-Present); Wesley Research Institute (1996-Present); Fellow of the Australian Academy of Science (2000-Present)

Professor Julie Hazel Campbell AO FAA is an Australian vascular biologist specialising in vascular smooth muscle. She is a professional fellow at the Australian Academy of Science and holds two patents for vascular implant material. Campbell discovered in the early 1970s that smooth muscle cells possess various phenotypes that regulate their biology and reaction to disease triggers, such as heart disease. Additionally, she uncovered methods to sustain these cells in a non-disease state. This newfound knowledge advanced the comprehension of atherosclerotic plaque formation and offered valuable insights into potential preventive measures.

Campbell has received recognition for her research into the development of blood vessels naturally within a patient, known as the "grow-your-own" arteries technique, a technique that improves the effectiveness of procedures such as heart bypass surgery.

== Biography ==
Campbell was born on 2 November 1946, in Sydney, Australia. In the fourth grade, she was selected to attend an advanced class that was specifically reserved for high achievers. She attended St. George Girls High School and completed her Bachelor of Science (BSc) completed at the University of New South Wales in 1968. At the age of 22, Campbell married Gordon Ronald Campbell. She then earned a Doctor of Philosophy (PhD) at the University of Melbourne, in 1973. In 1975, Campbell and her husband each held a career position of postdoctoral research in the Department of Zoology at the University of Melbourne. In 1976, Campbell and her husband followed their first Ph.D. supervisor, Burnstock, to the University College of London for a year to continue their postdoctoral research in the Department of Anatomy and Embryology. In 1978, the couple went to the University of Iowa for nine months, before going to the University of Washington in Seattle to finish their postdoctoral research. During this period of time, Campbell had three children, and continued to dedicate her time to her research. In 1991, Campbell's husband was offered the chair of anatomy at the University of Queensland, so the couple moved once more.

== Career ==
In 1968, Campbell attended the University of New South Wales, where she graduated as an honor student with a bachelor's degree in science in physiology. In 1973, she earned her doctorate degree in neurology from the University of Melbourne.

Campbell's postdoctoral experience extends from working at the University of Melbourne (1973–75), University College London (1976), the University of Iowa (1977) and the University of Washington (1977–78). During this period, she researched the biology of smooth muscle cells in normal artery walls of the human body. She recognised the importance of her findings for treating arteries affected by Atherosclerosis.

In 1978, when Campbell returned to Australia, she was employed by the Baker Medical Research Institute in Melbourne. From this period, she obtained the career position as a senior research officer at the institution (1978–80) and Principal Research Fellow (1987-1991). Her studies consolidated her early findings on vascular smooth muscle biology.

In 1991, she left her position as the principal research fellow (1987–91) at the Baker Medical Research Institute. Campbell moved to Brisbane and became the founding director of the Centre for Research in Vascular Biology at the University of Queensland. With her experience, she obtained the career position as the principal research fellow in the Department of Anatomical Sciences (1991–94). She became the inaugural president of the Australian Vascular Biology Society in Institute at the Wesley Hospital in 1996.

=== Current projects ===
Today, Campbell continues her work that ultimately began back in the early 1980s. Both Campbell and her husband began their work by looking at the origin of Myofibroblasts, which form as part of the inflammatory response to a wound. They noticed that these Myofibroblasts resembled the cells that form arteries, and hoped to eventually use this knowledge to grow artificial arteries and vessels. Campbell has been developing a technique to grow the artificial blood vessel in the body cavity of the person it will be implanted in, to reduce the risk of rejection. In 1992, Campbell founded the Australian Vascular Biology Society, which she cites as the achievement she is most proud of. Additionally, she is the current chair of the Queensland Fellows of the Australian Academy of Science, and a member of the council.

== Recognition for achievements ==
Campbell has won worldwide acclaim for her ground-breaking research into the domain of the development of blood vessels naturally within a patient. This process underwent pre-clinical trials in humans and while it has been highly successful in animal models, it is yet used to treat human patients suffering coronary heart disease, renal failure and other life-threatening conditions. This ‘Grow Your Own Arteries’ technique would help patients survive coronary heart disease, renal failure and other life-threatening conditions.

Campbell was awarded the Wellcome Australia Medal for Medical and Scientific Research. During this year, she has obtained the position as Senior Principal Research Fellow at the National Health and Medical Research Council (NHMRC), and she was also a research professor at the University of Queensland.

In the 2006 Queen's Birthday Honours Campbell was appointed Officer of the Order of Australia (AO) for "service to science and to medical research, particularly in the area of cell biology of coronary artery and other vascular diseases, and to education".

== Present positions ==
Campbell is currently:

- Senior principal research fellow, NHMRC
- Research professor, University of Queensland
- Director, Centre for research in Vascular Biology at the School of Biomedical Sciences at the University of Queensland.
- Director, Wesley Research Institute, Wesley Hospital.
- Director, VasCam Pty Ltd.
- Member of executive committee (EXCOM) and council, Australian Academy of Science.
- Secretary of education and public awareness, Australian Academy of Science.

Her main career is the director of the Australian Institute for Bioengineering and Nanotechnology (AIBN) for the University of Queensland.

== Awards ==
Campbell has been awarded:

- The Wellcome Australia Medal and Award for 1995
- Fellow of Australia Academy of Sciences 2000
- Centenary Medal 2003
- Queensland Greats Award 2004
- Officer of the Order of Australia (AO) in the General Division 2006
- Queensland Businesswoman of the Year 2007 — Public & Not for Profit Section

== Publications ==
- 228 international scientific journals
- 2 international patents
- 65 lectures at the international conferences
- 4 books on cardiac muscle, vascular smooth muscle and tissue engineering of the arteries
- "Therapeutic Uses of Beta-casein a2 and dietary supplement containing beta-casein a2"
- Grow Your Own Arteries
