= Geoff Harvey =

Australian musician, composer and conductor (1935–2019)

Geoff Harvey OAM
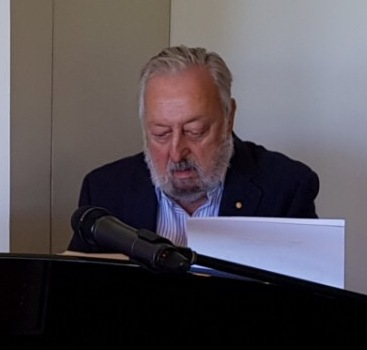
- Harvey in 2018
- Born: Geoffrey John Harvey; 6 August 1935; London, England, United Kingdom
- Died: 30 March 2019 (aged 83); Gold Coast, Queensland, Australia
- Occupations: Pianist; Musical director; Conductor; Television Personality
- Years active: 1961–2018
- Known for: The Mike Walsh Show; Midday; The Don Lane Show; Carols by Candlelight
- Spouses: Penny Spence; Katrina Harvey (m. 1987–2019)
- Children: 3
- Website: geoffharveyshow.com.au

Geoffrey John Harvey OAM (6 August 1935 – 30 March 2019) was an English-Australian musician, pianist, conductor, musical director and television personality who worked at the Australian Nine Network for 38 years. Known primarily for his appearances on The Mike Walsh Show and Midday, Harvey also composed a number of the theme songs for the network's programs.

== Early life ==
Harvey was born on 6 August 1935 in London, England, and lived through the Blitz during the Second World War. He was born into a musical family: his father played the fiddle while his mother was a piano player. Harvey began playing piano and the organ at the age of six and when he was eight he began playing at his local Catholic church. By age 14, he was playing in Westminster Cathedral. His first job was as a saxophonist in a band at the Round Towers Irish Club in Holloway Road, North London as a 15-year-old. After completing his education and national service he began playing in jazz clubs across Europe.

== Nine Network ==
Harvey came to Australia in the early 1960s to join EMI Music Australia, producing records for the label with Bryan Davies. He was only due to stay in the country for a year but decided to remain, finding work in the new medium of television. Harvey joined the Nine Network in 1961 working on Bob Rogers' Tonight Show. In 1963, he was appointed the musical director of Tonight with Dave Allen and then worked on The John Laws Show, Tonight Show with Charlie Brill and Mitzi McCall, Bandstand, Barry Crocker's Sound of Music and The Don Lane Show. His most prominent role was as the musical director of The Mike Walsh Show. and its successor Midday During the program's run he employed three bands which were rotated week to week. A firm advocate of live music on television, he often battled with the management of the network. During his time at Nine, he composed the theme songs for A Current Affair, Today, Sunday and The Sullivans, the latter being originally composed for the wedding of his first wife's cousin.

From 1984 to 2002, Harvey was also the musical director of Carols by Candlelight in Melbourne at the Sidney Myer Music Bowl before his successor John Foreman took over in 2003.

== Post television career ==
Following the cancellation of Midday, Harvey was sacked from Nine after 38 years on 6 May 1999. He appeared briefly on Sydney radio station 2GB alongside Kerri-Anne Kennerley in 2000.

In 1998, Harvey was appointed as the joint patron of the Mo Awards alongside Tommy Tycho who had been sole patron since 1981. They both continued in this role until 2005, with Harvey also serving as chairman in 1998 and from 2000 to 2002.

Harvey returned to studying in 2002, receiving his Associate in Music, Australia in organ in 2004 from the Australian Music Examinations Board and four years later his licentiate from Trinity College London. In October 2008, Harvey donated to the National Library of Australia his collection of 5,000 original arrangements and in 2011, he began teaching music in his studio at home.

In 2017, Harvey still performed in live theatre, taking to the stage to play piano in his comedy revue Senior Moments with Lex Marinos, Benita Collings and John Derum.

== Awards ==
Harvey was a recipient of the Medal of the Order of Australia during the 2006 Queen's Birthday Honours for "service to the community as a musician and entertainer, and through support for charitable organisations". Harvey was a patron for ConnecTeD (Friends of the Connective Tissue Dysplasia, Children's Hospital at Westmead), from 1992.

== Personal life ==
Known as a practical joker and for making "wild bets", he grew a beard as a result of losing a 1965 bet to Don Lane on a football match.

Harvey married fellow television personality Penny Spence and they had two children together: Eugenie in 1968 and Charlotte two years later. They lived together in the Sydney suburb of Epping. He lived in the village of Berrima in the Southern Highlands of New South Wales with his second wife of 38–39 years, Katrina. Katrina also worked at Nine as the long-time personal assistant to executive Sam Chisholm.

He died on the Gold Coast in March 2019, aged 83.

== Discography ==
=== Studio albums ===
List of albums, with selected chart positions
Title	Album details	Peak chart positions
Title	Album details	AUS
Playing Favourites (And The Midday Show Band)	Released: 1987; Format: LP, CD; Label: Priority (RML-53246)	79
Maestro and the Music Man	Released: 1997; Format: CD; Label: BMG (74321-56290-2)	58
