= Pović =

Pović is a surname. Notable people with the surname include:

- Mirjana Pović (born 1981), Serbian astrophysicist
- Miloš Pović, nobleman who held a disputed zone that included Zvečan in 1370

== See also ==
- Povich
