= Povich =

Povich is a surname. Notable people with the surname include:

- Cade Povich (born 2000), American baseball player
- Lynn Povich (born 1943), American journalist
- Maury Povich (born 1939), American television personality
- Shirley Povich (1905–1998), American sports columnist and reporter

== See also ==
- Polich (surname)
- Pović
- Yovich
