= UnitingCare Health =

UnitingCare Health is a large not-for-profit private hospital group in Australia. It is part of UnitingCare Australia.

It is composed over 5 separate facilities:

- Wesley Hospital (Brisbane)
- St Andrew's War Memorial Hospital
- Buderim Private Hospital, Buderim
- St Stephen's Hospital, Maryborough, Queensland
- St Stephen's Hospital, Hervey Bay
