= Yovich =

Yovich is a surname. Notable people with the surname include:

- John Yovich (born 1959), Australian educator and veterinary doctor
- Joseph Yovich (born 1976), New Zealand cricketer
- Ursula Yovich (born 1977), Australian actress and singer

== See also ==
- Jović
