= Polich (surname) =

Polich is a surname. Notable people with the surname include:

- John Polich (1915–2001), American ice hockey player
- Mike Polich (born 1952), American ice hockey player

== See also ==
- Povich
