= Jović =

Jović (Cyrillic: Јовић) is a South Slavic surname, a patronymic from a diminutive for Jovan. Notable people with the surname include:

- Aleksandar Jović (born 1972), retired Serbian international football player
- Boban Jović (born 1991), Slovenian footballer
- Bojan Jović (born 1982), Serbian football goalkeeper
- Borisav Jović (1928–2021), Serbian communist politician, served as the Serbian member of the collective presidency of Yugoslavia
- Božidar Jović (born 1972), Croatian handball player
- Dejan Jović (born 1968), Croatian political scientist
- Dragan Jović (born 1963), Bosnian football manager
- Filip Jović (born 1997), Serbian footballer
- Iva Jovic (born 2007), American tennis player
- Ivo Miro Jović (born 1950), the former Bosnian Croat member of the tripartite Presidency of Bosnia and Herzegovina
- Josip Jović (1969–1991), Croatian police officer
- Luka Jović (born 1997), Serbian footballer
- Milan Jović (born 1975), retired Serbian professional footballer
- Milovan Jović (1955–2009), Serbian footballer
- Mirko Jović (born 1959), the candidate for president of Serbia in the 2004 presidential election
- Nikola Jović (born 2003), Serbian basketball player
- Predrag Jović (born 1987), Serbian footballer
- Stefan Jović (born 1990), Serbian basketball player

== See also ==
- Yovich
