= Helen Monkivitch =

Australian Sister of Mercy and public health provider

Helen Monkivitch AO
- Born: Helen Mary Monkivitch; 1942 (age 83–84)
- Employer(s): Mercy Health and Aged Care
- Honours: Victorian Honour Roll of Women (2014)

Helen Monkivitch RSM AO (born 1942) is an Australian medical administrator and religious sister. She was the first female to be elected president of the Australian College of Health Service Executives and has been recognised for her work in aged care.

== Career ==
Helen Monkivitch was born in 1942. She trained as a nurse then midwife at Mercy Private Hospital in Victoria in 1964 and then took vows with the Sisters of Mercy. In 1971 she transferred to Mercy Maternity Hospital, initially as a charge sister, then supervisor before being promoted to deputy director of nursing in 1976.

She completed a Bachelor of Arts, followed by a Masters of Health Administration in 1983. The following year she was promoted to sister administrator at Mercy Maternity Hospital. This led to her appointment as CEO of the Mercy Hospital for Women in 1986. In the same year she played a pivotal role in the establishment of Catholic Health Australia and was a founding director.

In 1988 Monkivitch was the first female to be elected president of the Australian College of Health Service Executives.

She became director of Mercy Health and Aged Care in 1997.

== Awards and recognition ==
Monkitvitch was appointed an Officer of the Order of Australia in the 2006 Queen's Birthday Honours for "service to the community, particularly through the establishment of major health, aged and palliative care facilities in Victoria, and to the Catholic Church". She was inducted onto the Victorian Honour Roll of Women in 2014.
