= Wesley Hospital (Brisbane) =

Hospital in Queensland, Australia

Coordinates: 27°28′39.3″S 152°59′51″E

- Uniting Care Health
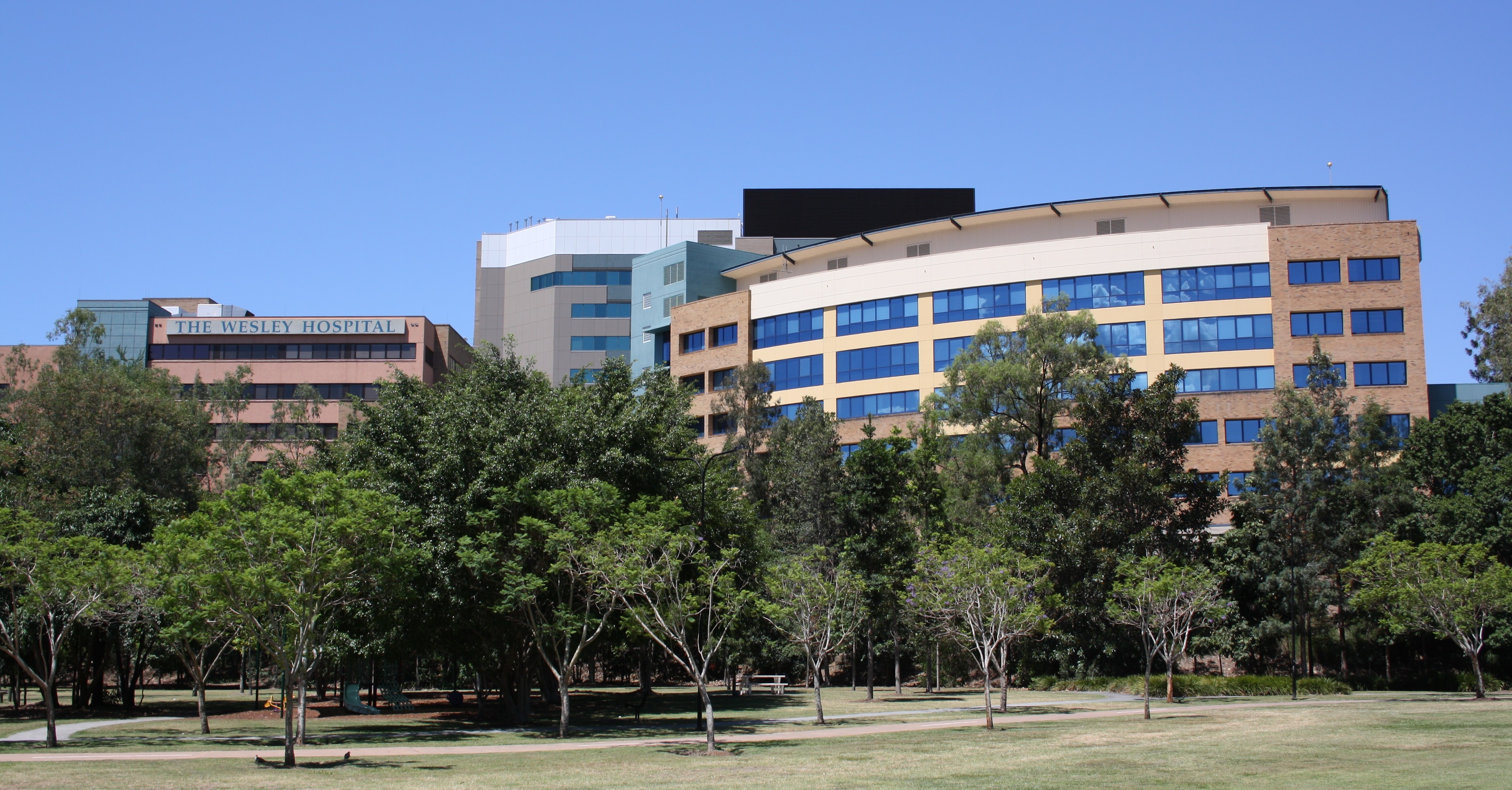

Geography
- Location: Auchenflower, Brisbane, QLD, Australia

Services
- Beds: 530+

History
- Founded: 1896 (old campus, southbank), moved March 1977 (Auchenflower)

Links
- Website: wesley.com.au
- Lists: Hospitals in Australia

The Wesley Hospital is a private hospital located in the suburb of Auchenflower in Brisbane, Queensland, Australia.

The hospital currently has over 530 beds and offers a large range of clinical services. It is owned and operated by UnitingCare Health, part of the Uniting Church in Australia. The hospital recently underwent works and an extension.

The hospital is named after Reverend John Wesley, an important clergyman of the Church of England in the 18th century.

The hospital is well known for its 'Kim Walters Choices Program' which supports men, women and their families who have been diagnosed with breast or gynecological cancer. This program is free.

== Transport ==
The Wesley Hospital is accessible by bus routes which travel along Coronation Drive, and also from Auchenflower railway station which is situated behind the hospital.

== History ==
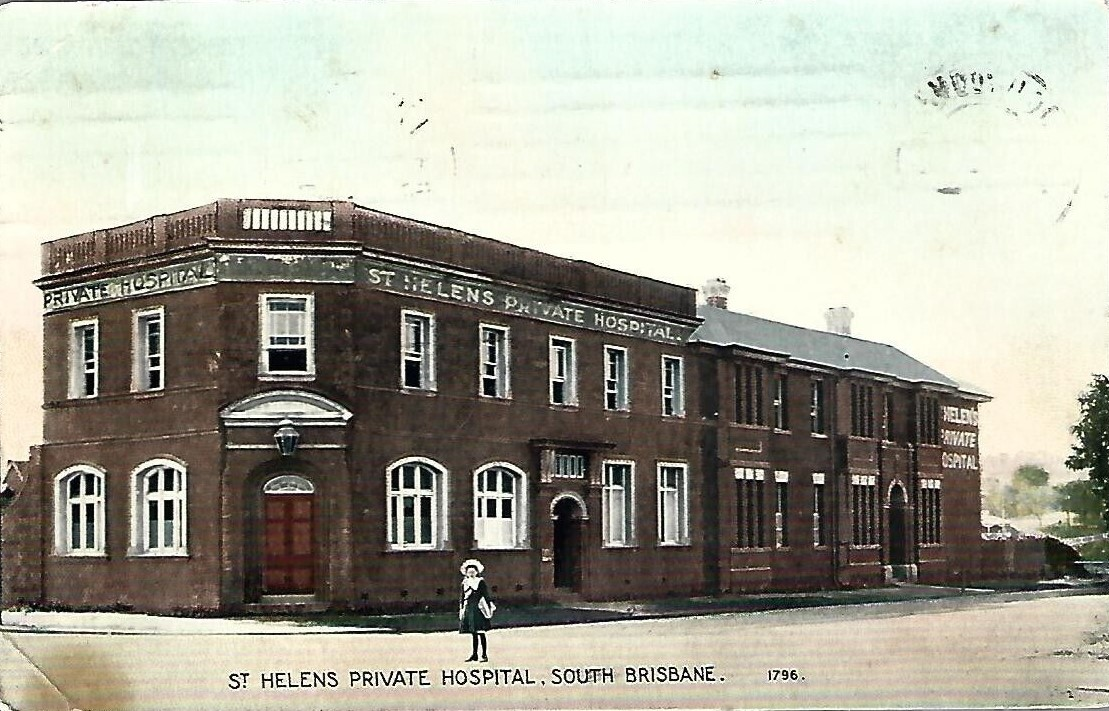
St Helens Private Hospital, Peel Street, South Brisbane, circa 1910

The Wesley Hospital has its roots in St Helen's Hospital (Brisbane) at South Brisbane, which sat on the banks of the Brisbane River in the current location of the State Library of Queensland. St Helen's Hospital was opened in 1896; its development was led by prominent local surgeon Dr E Sandford Jackson.

In the late 1960s, it became clear St Helen's Hospital could not expand on its existing site. This led to the purchase of the house Moorlands at Auchenflower in 1971. The Queensland Government would not allow the hospital to operate on two sites under the same name, so the new site became the Wesley Hospital. Construction commenced in 1975 and the Wesley Hospital received its first patients by ambulance convoy from St Helen's on 1 March 1977.

The current radiology department and emergency room opened in 1995, Kirkup Wing in 1991, intensive care unit in 2000, and dialysis unit in 2001. Other modern developments include the Evan Thompson Building, named after former surgeon and hospital medical advisory committee chairman Sir Evan Thompson, and the Moorlands Wing.
