= Ron Langman =

Australian businessperson

Ronald "Ron" Keith Langman is a South Australian photographer, businessperson and entrepreneur.

== Career ==
In the 1970s he created the Home Ideas Centre which brought all of the suppliers servicing the domestic building industry together under one roof which proved a national success. This idea was followed by the success of Selector.com, a website providing an online service similar to his previous venture. In 2004 he received a Master of Entrepreneurship from the University of Adelaide and in 2006 was made a Member of the Order of Australia "for service to the building and construction industry through the establishment of collaborative marketing ventures and as a mentor for young entrepreneurs." His work commercialising intellectual property, including ideas of young businesspersons he mentored earned him seats on the Australian Government's Intellectual Property Advisory Council, and on the board of Intellectual Property Australia. He has also acted as a councillor for the Royal Zoological Society of South Australia and was founder of the Adelaide Art Directors Club.

In August 2016, Ron opened The Strand Gallery in Port Elliot, where he sells the work of local artists, including some of his own. The gallery is housed in a former Post Office building in the township. In his youth he worked as a fashion photographer in London before establishing a food photography specialist studio.
