= Guy Hamilton (doctor) =

Australian physician and disability advocate (1923–2010)

Guy Hamilton AM
- Born: Guy Joseph Livingston Hamilton; 4 July 1923; Buckhurst Hill, Essex, England
- Died: 21 December 2010 (aged 87)
- Education: Epsom College
- Occupations: Physician and disability-services administrator
- Known for: Reform of services for people with intellectual disability in Western Australia

Guy Joseph Livingston Hamilton AM (4 July 1923 – 21 December 2010) was a British-born Australian physician and medical administrator who played a leading role in reforming services for people with intellectual disability in Western Australia. As head of the state's Mental Deficiency Division from 1964 to 1982, he promoted a shift from institutional and custodial care towards education, community living and social participation.

== Early life and education ==
Hamilton was born on 4 July 1923 in Buckhurst Hill, Essex, into a family of physicians. He attended Epsom College from 1937 to 1941 and received the Freer Lucas Entrance Scholarship to study at Middlesex Hospital Medical School, where he qualified in medicine.

Hamilton's youngest son was born deaf and with cerebral palsy, an experience that contributed to his interest in services for children with disabilities. In 1956, while applying for a medical position at the Spastic Centre in Perth, Hamilton contracted poliomyelitis. He was interviewed while in hospital and accepted for the position. Hamilton and his family emigrated to Western Australia in 1957, and he worked at the centre for four years.

== Career in Western Australia ==
In 1961 Hamilton joined the Western Australian Mental Health Services as a physician at Claremont Mental Hospital. At the time, children and adults with intellectual disability were commonly accommodated in large psychiatric institutions and received limited education or developmental support.

Hamilton became physician superintendent of the Mental Deficiency Division in 1964 and remained its head until 1982. His approach placed greater emphasis on the social, educational and community needs of people with intellectual disability rather than treating them solely as medical patients. Children were progressively moved out of Claremont Mental Hospital into community-based facilities, and training courses were established for “social trainers”, staff whose work combined education, personal support and the development of independent living skills.

Hamilton was a founding member of the Australian Group for the Scientific Study of Mental Deficiency, established in the 1960s as a national professional organisation concerned with intellectual disability. The organisation was subsequently renamed and is now known as the Australasian Society for Intellectual Disability.

He was also involved in acquiring the former Tresillian Hospital in Nedlands for use as accommodation for children with intellectual disability.

== Honours and legacy ==
Hamilton was appointed a Member of the Order of Australia in the 2006 Queen's Birthday Honours for service to people with disabilities, particularly through the development of educational and support services. In 2007 he received the Western Australian Citizen of the Year Award for Community Service.

Hamilton died on 21 December 2010. In a condolence statement, Western Australian Minister for Disability Services Helen Morton described his work as central to the development of modern disability services in the state.

The Western Australian branch of the Australasian Society for Intellectual Disability established the Guy Hamilton Honours Research Scholarship for university students undertaking research related to intellectual disability.
