= John Yovich =

Dr John Vincent Yovich AM (born 16 November 1959) is an Australian educator and veterinary doctor, former Vice-Chancellor of Murdoch University, and former Perth Racing managing director fired after sexual misconduct, located in the suburb of Murdoch, Western Australia.

== History ==
Professor Yovich earned a Bachelor of Veterinary Medicine and Surgery from Murdoch University in 1981. He also received a Diploma in Large Animal Medicine and Surgery from the University of Guelph from 1982 to 1983.

He went abroad and graduated with a Master of Science in 1986 and PhD in 1988 from Colorado State University. He also gained other professional qualifications from the American College of Veterinary Surgeons in 1987 and as a Registered Specialist in Veterinary Surgery and Equine Surgery.

He was the Vice-Chancellor of Murdoch University from 2002 to 2011. Yovich was the head of the veterinary school of Murdoch University prior to his role as vice chancellor.

== Controversy ==
John Yovich was sacked from his role as Perth Racing managing director in May 2021 over allegations of ‘serious inappropriate workplace conduct’. “The board applauds the brave staff member who came forward with their credible account and evidence of what occurred,” the statement read.

Academic offices
Preceded by Steven Schwartz	Vice-Chancellor of Murdoch University; 2002–2011	Succeeded by Richard Higgott
