= Great Cobar mine =

Copper mine in Australia

Coordinates: 31°29′58.4″S 145°50′32.8″E

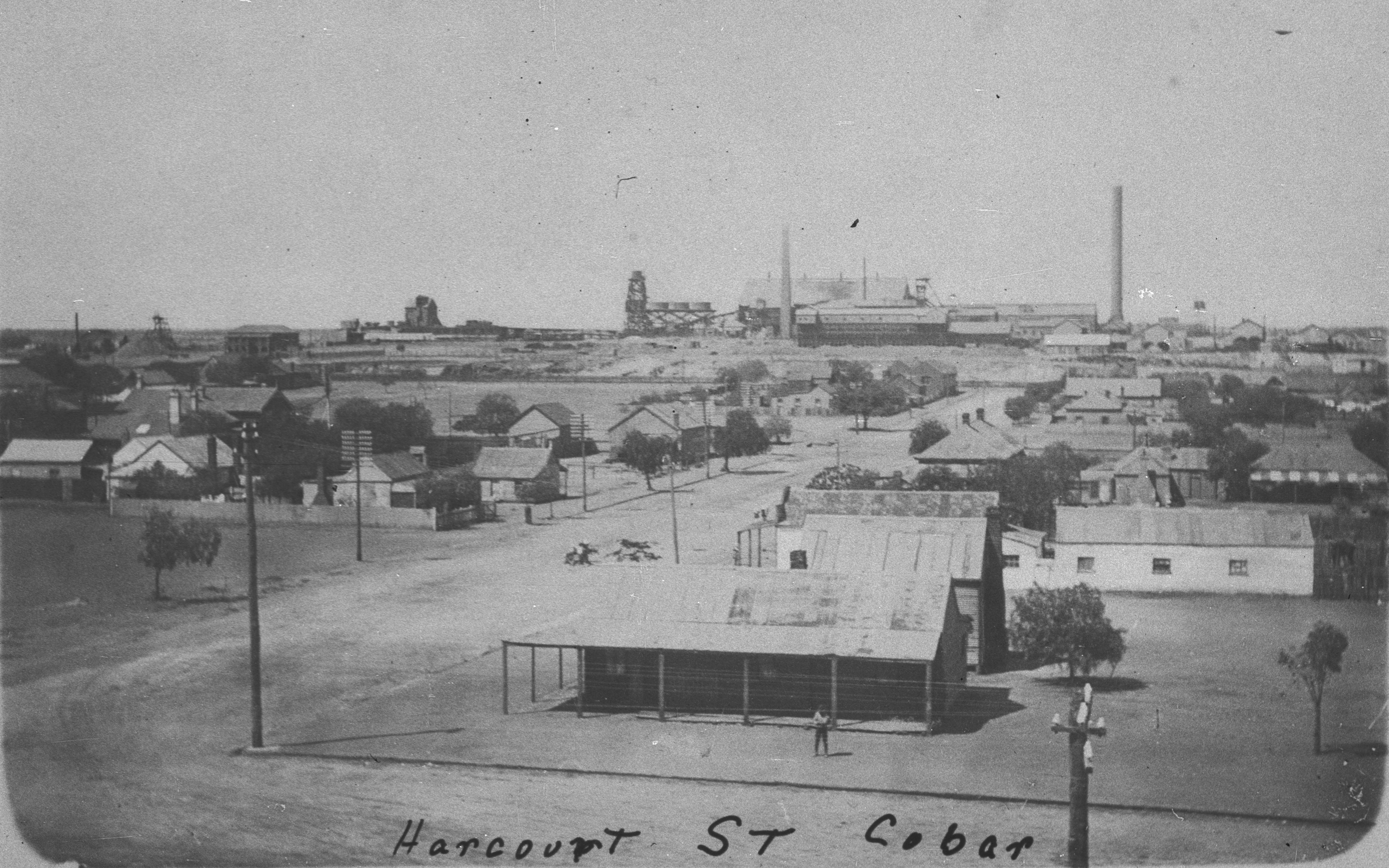
View of the Great Cobar site from Cobar township, looking east (1915).

Great Cobar mine was a copper mine, located at Cobar, New South Wales, Australia, which also produced significant amounts of gold and silver. It operated between 1871 and 1919. Over that period, it was operated by five entities; Cobar Copper Mining Company (1871–1875), Great Cobar Copper-Mining Company (1876–1889), Great Cobar Mining Syndicate (1894–1906), Great Cobar Limited (1906–1914), and finally the receiver representing the debentures holders of Great Cobar Limited (1915–1919). Its operations included mines and smelters at Cobar, an electrolytic copper refinery, coal mine and coke works at Lithgow, and a coal mine and coke works at Rix's Creek near Singleton.

== Origins ==
=== Discovery of the lode ===
In the winter of 1870, three well and bore sinkers, two Danes, Thomas Hartman and Charles Campbell (a.k.a. Kempf) and a Scotsman, George Samson Gibb, with two Aboriginal guides, 'Boney' and 'Frank', were heading south, following a route between waterholes that were known to the guides. Camping overnight at the Kuppar waterhole, 100 miles south of Bourke, they noticed blue and green streaks in rocks near the waterhole.

The area now known as Cobar lies on the traditional lands of the Wangaaypuwan-speaking people (also known as Wangaibon) of the Ngiyampaa. According to a statement made by Thomas Hartman, in 1899, the site of the discovery was a campsite for local people, who used the blue and green minerals as a body paint.

They took samples from an outcrop around 65 feet wide, later identified as the Great Cobar lode, and continued on their way. At Gilgunnia, they showed the samples to Sidwell Kruge—a woman of Cornish origin, previously residing in the copper-mining town of Burra—who identified the samples as ores containing copper. Sidwell's husband, Henry Kruge, smelted some of the ore samples in a blacksmith's forge to prove beyond doubt that the ore contained copper.

On 16 September 1870, reports of the discovery were made by the Bourke correspondent of the Dubbo Dispatch. The source was Charles Campbell, who had arrived in Bourke from the Lachlan, travelling via the site of the copper deposit, not yet known as Cobar. He brought ore samples to Bourke. One specimen of ore, "with the aid of a frying pan and the forge bellows, we roughly smelted, and procured an abundance of copper". Campbell already had men at the site "securing water". At Bourke, others became involved, notably a Bourke businessman, Joseph Becker. On 6 October 1870, 40 acres of land, which included the outcrop, was taken up in the names of Campbell, Hartman, Gibb, and Becker.

=== After the discovery - Campbell, Hartman, and Gibb ===
None of the discoverers of the copper lode at Cobar made large fortunes from it.

George Samson Gibb retained a share in the mine, but died at Bourke in December 1875.

Charles Campbell seems to have sold his share early, since his name is absent from the 1872 list of shareholders. By mid 1874, he was keeping an inn, at Gongolgon, on the Bogan River; before the direct road from Bourke to Cobar was opened, it was a stopping place on a longer but better-watered route. He died at Parramatta, in June 1883.

Thomas Hartman sold his share in the Cobar mine to Joseph Becker in 1872. He found copper carbonate near Girilambone Hill, north-west of Nyngan, in 1875. In 1879, Hartman, Charles Campbell, and two others took out a mineral claim there. However, their claim was disputed and withdrawn after Hartman and Campbell concluded that it was only a shallow deposit. In March 1881, the Girilambone Copper Mining Company Ltd was formed with a nominal capital of £75,000 in £100 shares. Its directors included Russell Barton, but Hartman and Campbell were not involved. By early 1882, there was already a mining village, known as Girilambone, near the copper mine, and from late 1882, a copper smelter. Hartman became a hotel keeper at Girilambone. He lived there for many years, but subsequently moved to Sydney, where he died seven months later, in June 1904.

Thomas Hartman, the last survivor of the trio, applied for and obtained a payment from the NSW Government in 1899 as recognition of his being the discoverer of copper ore at both Cobar and Girilambone. In his narrative of the time, the role of Campbell and Gibb in the Cobar discovery was given minimal weight.

== Cobar Copper Mining Company (1871–1875) ==
The three white discoverers were some of the first owners of the mine, along with four men from Bourke, Joseph Becker, William Bradley, Russell Barton, and James Smith. They called their new venture, Cobar Copper Mining Company. Becker applied to register the new company, with 20,000 £1 shares, on 1 July 1872. Although Becker and Bradley retained the largest shareholdings in the new company, there were 69 original shareholders, mostly from the region around Bourke. The original shareholders included all the first owners, except two; Thomas Hartman, who had sold his share to Becker, and Charles Campbell, whose name is absent from the first list of shareholders and, presumably, had also sold his share in the mine.

Thomas Lean, an experienced mine captain from South Australia's 'copper triangle', was employed to manage the venture. Impressed with the deposit, Lean brought six experienced copper miners from South Australia and sunk two shafts (Becker's shaft and Barton's shaft, 600 feet to the south). Lean also had a small shareholding at the time that the company was registered in 1872.

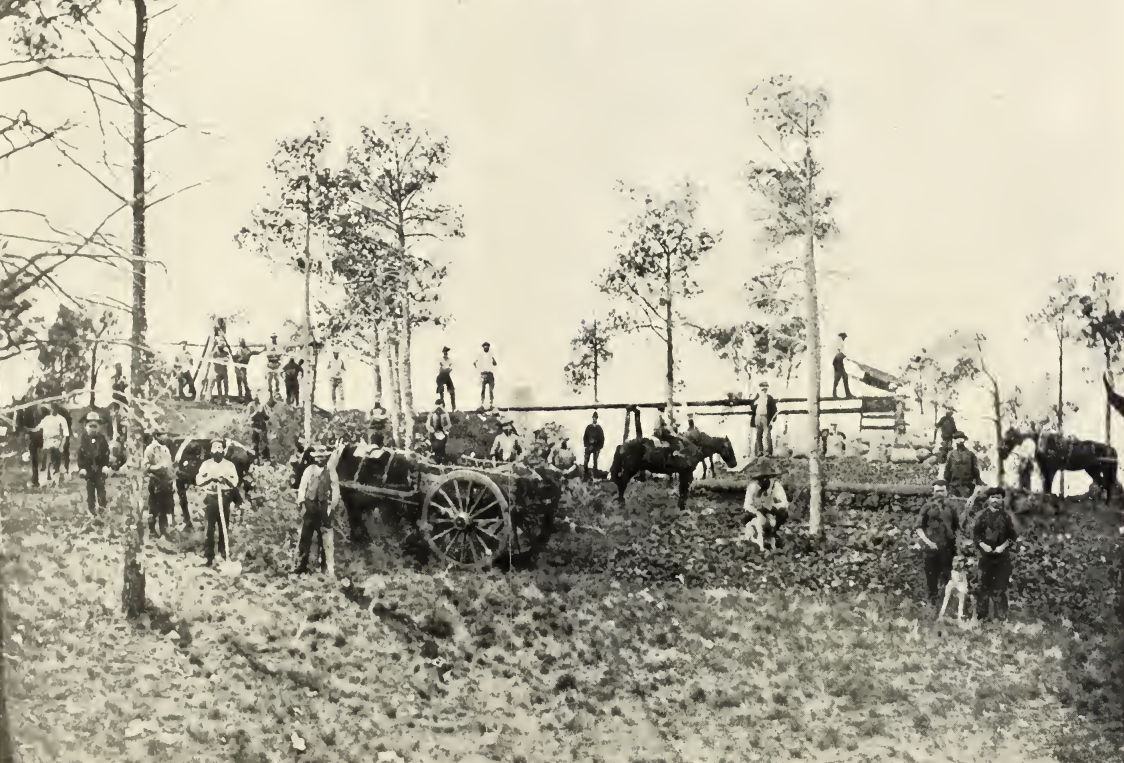
The mine in 1874

In mid-1872, the workings were shallow, only 7 fathoms (42 feet down), and the copper ores being mined were mainly copper oxides and copper carbonates. Rich ore (30% copper) was taken to Louth to await transport by riverboat, to smelters in South Australia, when the water depth of the Darling River allowed it. Lower-grade ore (15% copper) was stockpiled at the mine, pending the erection of smelters. Six reverberatory furnaces were constructed, two in 1875 and another four in 1876.

After the initial discovery, from 1870 to 1873, other prospectors made other claims in the area. These included the deposits that became the North Cobar and South Cobar mines, on the same line of lode as the Cobar mine, as well as a deposit further to the north, the CSA mine, and deposits to the south in the area that would later become Wrightville. The township of Cobar began to become a more permanent settlement.

=== Thomas Lean ===
Thomas Lean (1819–1901), known as Captain Thomas Lean, was born at Bere Alston, Devon, of Cornish ancestry. In 1840, he settled in South Australia, where his father, Joseph Lean, took a position as a mine manager.

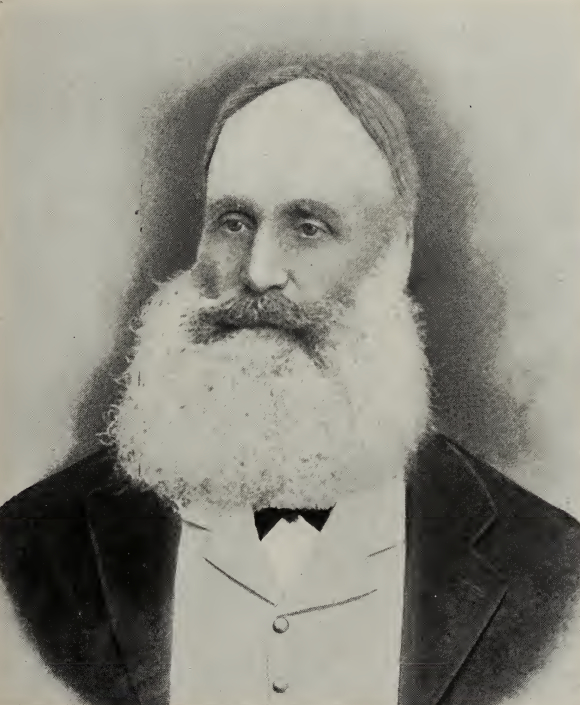
Thomas Lean

Thomas Lean made his career in mining, beginning work as a boy in copper, lead, and silver mines in Cornwall. Before coming to Cobar, he had extensive mine management experience in South Australia's copper mines and had also managed quartz reef gold mining at Steglitz in Victoria.

He became the manager of the Cobar Copper Mine in 1871 and held the position until around 1874. He had travelled to Cobar, first on a river paddle steamer, 'Princess Royal', only as far as Menindee, due to the low water level, and then by stagecoach. Upon arrival in Cobar, he realised the inherent difficulties of the location, and was important in opening the road from Cobar to the river port of Bourke on Darling River.

Thomas Lean remained in the Cobar area for the rest of his life. He became a long-serving Justice of the Peace. He remained involved in mines in the Cobar region, including being a director of the Occidental gold mine at Wrightville and the Mount Drysdale and Eldorado gold mines at Mount Drysdale. With his son-in-law, he took up land that he named 'Bulgoo station'—it still exists and lies south-wast of Cobar—pursuing pastoral activities for around five years, then operated a butchery in Cobar before retiring from business. After retiring, he lived for around 28 years on a small pastoral holding, known as 'Hildavale', which was "five or six miles north-east of Cobar". He died there, and was buried in the cemetery at Cobar.

=== Joseph Becker and Russell Barton ===
Joseph Becker (1832–1878) as born at Godesberg, near Bonn, in what was then in the Rhine Province, a part of Prussia, now Germany. After a short military service, he emigrated to Australia and settled in Bourke. He became involved in supplying residents and surrounding pastoral properties, later taking part in commercial land deals. Described as 'the King of Bourke', he was a successful and wealthy man by the time that he became involved with the newly discovered copper deposit.

It was Becker who paid £10 to secure the forty-acre site around the mineral outcrop that became the site of Cobar Copper Mine. He was the first manager of the Cobar Copper Mining Company. By the time of his early death, in 1878, he was the largest shareholder of the Great Cobar Copper-Mining Company. He was a Knight Commander of Saint Gregory.

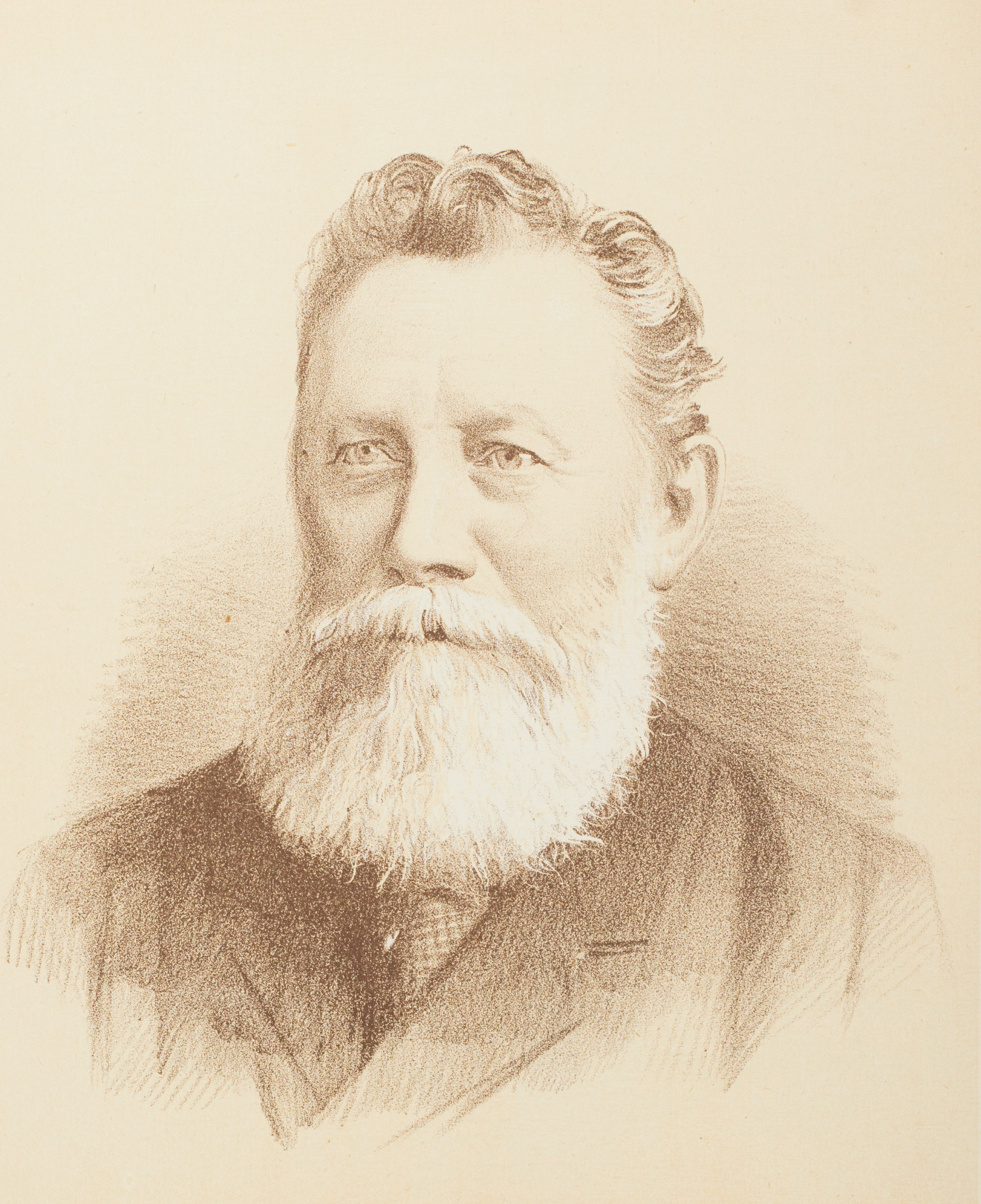
Russell Barton (1889)

Russell Barton (1830–1916) was born at Penge, in London. After emigrating to Australia, he began working on a cattle station, at the age of 11. His first involvement with copper mining was as a carrier at the copper mine in Burra. In 1868, he bought 'Mooculta', a property that he had previously managed. At the time of the copper discovery, he was a grazier in the Bourke district. He later recounted that he had introduced Campbell to Joseph Becker and that Becker had given him some shares in the mining venture as a result. (On the assumption that Barton did introduce Campbell to Becker, he is most probably the anonymous Bourke correspondent of the Dubbo Dispatch, who made the first press report of the discovery on 16 September 1870.) He became the venture's Managing Director and, from 1883, was the Chairman of the Great Cobar Mining Company.

Barton's name appeared—jointly with metallurgist Claude Theodore James Vautin and mine manager George Hardie—on a patent application, for "Improvements in the refining of impure commercial copper", made in 1881.

Barton was involved in other mines at Nymagee, Girilambone, and Broken Hill, and was a director of fourteen other mining companies in addition to Great Cobar. He became a director of Mercantile Mutual Insurance Co. Ltd, Mutual Life Insurance Co., the British and Foreign Marine Insurance Co. Ltd, and was managing director of the Pastoral Finance Association Ltd. He was a Member of the NSW Legislative Assembly, representing Bourke, an electorate that included both Bourke and Cobar, between 1880 and 1886.

He died in 1916, at what was then part of Five Dock, now Russell Lea, a suburb of Sydney. The suburb takes its name from Barton's grand Italianate house and its 60 acres of land, 'Russell Lea'. Russell was the maiden name of Russell Barton's mother.

Becker had holdings of land that were subsequently privately sub-divided and his former landholdings occupy a significant part of the Cobar township, The names Becker, Barton, and Bradley (another director) appear as street names in modern-day Cobar.

== Great Cobar Copper Mining Company (1876–1889) ==
=== Amalgamation ===
At the end of 1875, the Cobar and South Cobar companies were amalgamated into one entity, which was registered as the Great Cobar Copper Mining Company in January 1876, aiming to expand the mine and lift production.

The North Cobar mine lease lay to the north of the Great Cobar's lease. It always remained a separate entity from the Great Cobar.

=== Growth ===
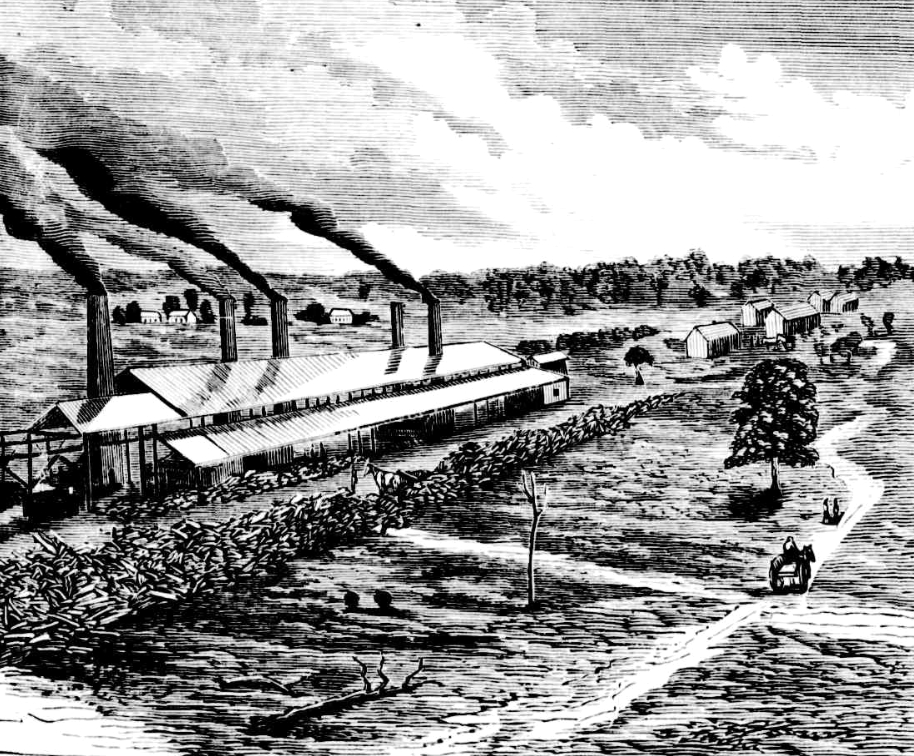
Smelters of Great Cobar mine, 1878. Note the stacks of firewood.

In 1877, James Dunstan was appointed as the manager of the newly amalgamated Great Cobar operation. Two more reverberatory furnaces were erected in 1878.

Production grew steadily. Comparing half-year periods, to January, copper production was 268 tons to January 1878, 868 tons to January 1879, 1,016 tons to January 1880, and 1,388 tons to January 1881. By mid 1881, five shafts had been sunk, aligned south to north as follows; Renwick's (or south shaft) depth 54 fathoms (324 feet); Hardie's shaft depth 39 fathoms; Barton's shaft (the most productive shaft) depth 54 fathoms; Bradley's shaft (an access shaft) depth 25 fathoms (150 feet); and Becker's shaft (the northernmost shaft) depth 54 fathoms.

In 1879, the mine began using a narrow-gauge tramway to transport ore from the mine to the furnaces. The tramway was elevated and ran across a massive wooden trestle bridge structure, around a quarter of a mile long, which ran from Barton's shaft to the smelter. A photograph of the time shows that it was manually operated.

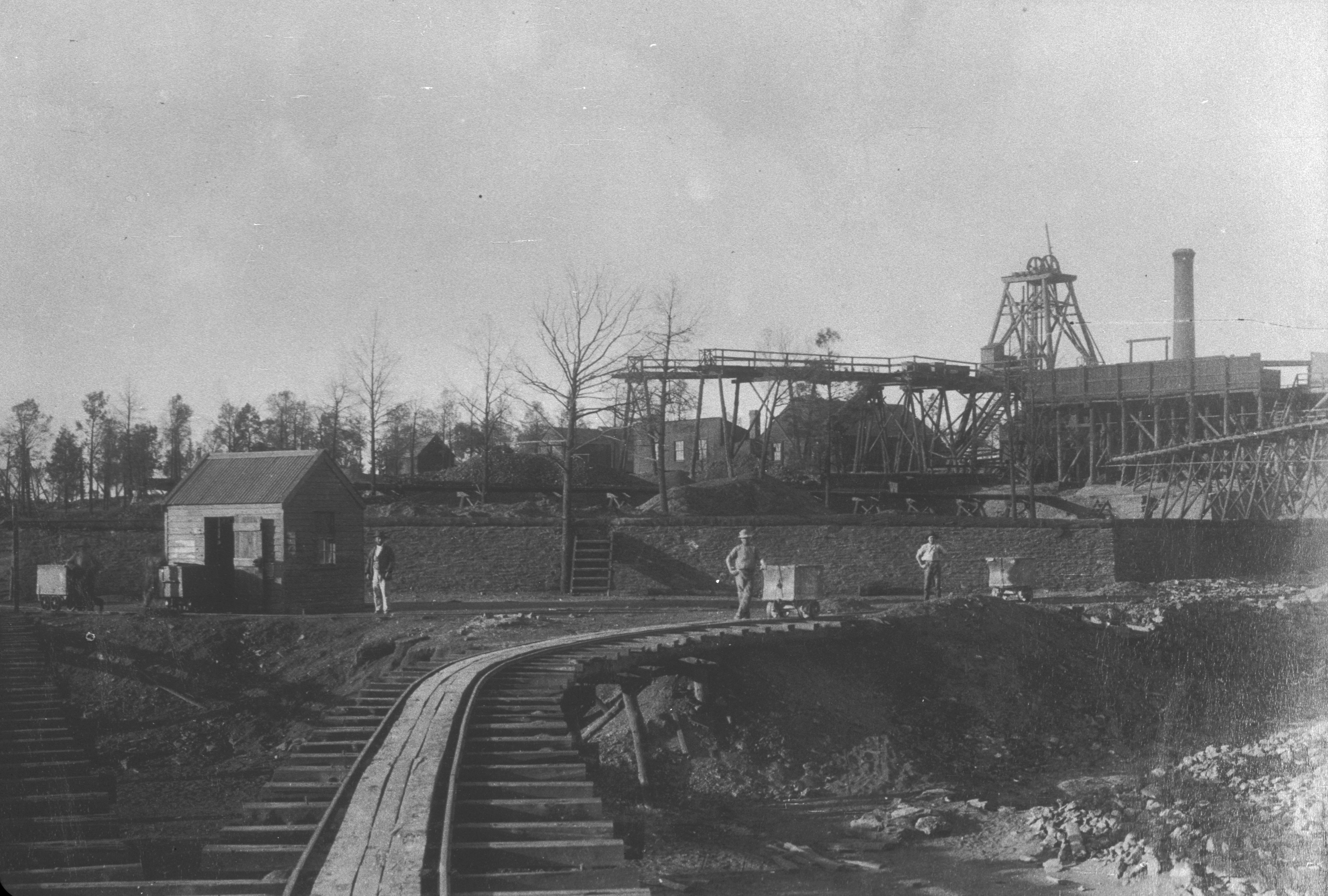
Great Cobar Copper Mine - c.1890 Barton's shaft and elevated tramway to smelters, most likely taken toward the end of the company's operations.

By mid 1881, the mine had a weekly payroll of £1,700 to £1,800 per week and a workforce of around 650. There were 170 miners, 125 smelter workers, about 150 wood-carters, and around 205 others (ore-dressers, brickmakers, tank-sinkers, and other mine employees).

The mine drew its water from a dam (referred to as a 'tank') to the east of the mine. The difficulties of Cobar's remote location and its semi-arid environment soon became apparent. The absence of rainfall also meant that residents of Cobar sometimes needed to buy their water, which came from other areas in tank loads. Water was so precious and expensive that, in times of shortage, armed guards patrolled the 'tank'.

Copper was being shipped from Bourke, only when water levels in the Darling would allow steamboats to come up the Darling River. The alternative was to carry the copper to the nearest railhead, originally Orange, later Nyngan.

The furnaces required vast amounts of wood as fuel. In the early 1880s, a second tramway network was begun to bring firewood from farther away, but it was only officially authorised in 1884. The plant's fourteen furnaces consumed 70,000 tons of firewood annually, of which 62,000 tons came via the tramway and the remaining 8,000 tons by bullock drays. By 1889, the steam-operated tramway extended east and south-east, providing access to large stands of trees.

Although Great Cobar was, by then, classed as a low-grade copper deposit, ore mined in the 1880s graded up to 7% copper.

As the Great Cobar mine followed the copper lodes deeper, it produced more sulphide ore. Dunstan introduced open-air ore roasting in 1883. The sulphide ore was roasted in open heaps, placed atop a layer of wood, which was then fired. The roasting process drove off the sulphur as noxious sulphur dioxide fumes, leaving behind copper oxides. The roasting heaps were situated south-east of Cobar township, so that the fumes would generally be blown away from the town.

A metallurgical engineer, Claude Vautin, demonstrated a water-jacket furnace and a converter to the company in 1884. Sulphide ores did not need prior roasting when smelted in such a furnace. However, such furnaces needed coke. With the nearest railway at Nyngan, the road freight cost of moving coke from there to Cobar made water-jacket furnaces uneconomic.

The wild copper price fluctuations of 1887 to 1889.

In 1885, James Dunstan was replaced as manager by R.N. Williams. Copper prices were falling, and costs needed to be reined in to keep the operation profitable. Further, years of firewood harvesting were beginning to denude the plains in a wide area surrounding Cobar. It became clear that Cobar would become non-competitive without a railway connection, which would allow coke to be brought in economically. The Nyngan to Cobar Railway Bill was passed in 1886, but the railway was still some years away. Another railway act was passed in 1890, actually authorising work on the railway to commence.

The temporary increase in copper prices in 1888—Pierre-Eugène Secrétan, manager of Société des Métaux attempted to manipulate the international copper market in that year—was not sufficient to keep the mine working. The copper price collapsed in 1889. The mine was idle from August 1889.

== Great Cobar Mining Syndicate (1894–1906) ==
=== The syndicate ===
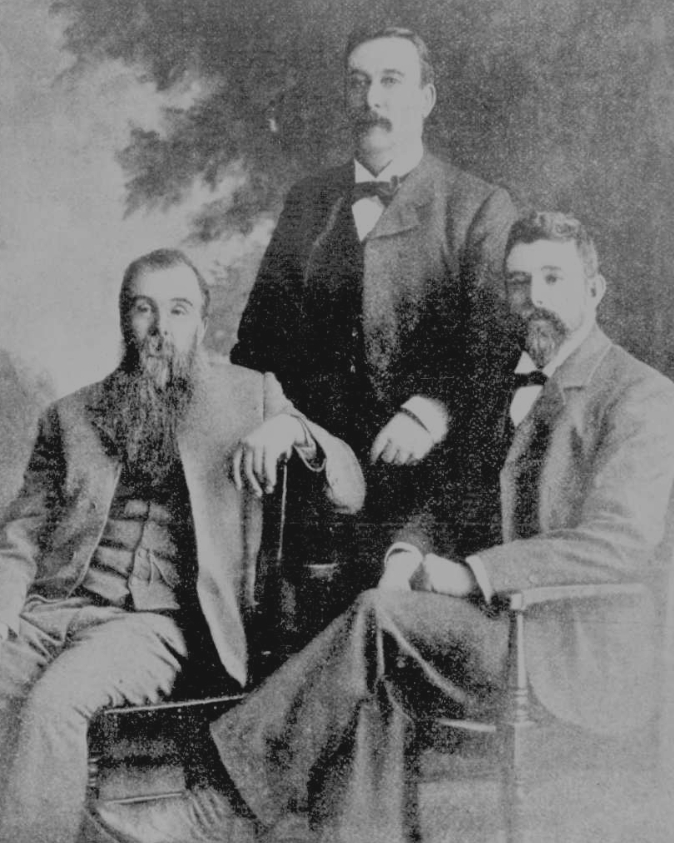
Three of the Great Cobar Mining Syndicate (c.1901). Left to right: William Longworth, Richard Read, and Thomas Longworth

The next phase of the mine's development and operation is associated with two brothers, William Longworth (1846–1928) and Thomas Longworth (1857–1927), and their syndicate partners, in particular Dr Richard Read (c.1848—1920).

The Longworth brothers' father, also Thomas Longworth, was a Lancashire coal miner, recruited by the Australian Agricultural Company in 1849. In 1878, he established his own small coal mine at Rix's Creek, near Singleton, in the Upper Hunter Valley. After the death of their father in a mining accident in 1884, the two Longworth brothers became joint owners of the mine. Their neighbour, Dr Richard Read, a Singleton medical practitioner, also owned another small coal mine. Originally fierce competitors, they joined forces after Read won a contract but could not mine enough coal to meet its requirements.

By taking an additional partner, Albert Gould, they expanded their coal mines and built coke ovens under the business name Singleton Coal and Coke Company. Around 1890, the partners became interested in the then idle Great Cobar mine, initially as an outlet for their coke, retaining as their adviser the mine's ex-manager, James Dunstan. Dunstan had been mine manager at the time of the successful demonstration of a water jacket furnace and converter at Cobar, in 1884.

The completion of a railway line to Cobar in 1892, made it feasible to bring coke from Rix's Creek to Cobar. Coke would allow the use of water jacket furnaces, a type of blast furnace used for non-ferrous metal smelting, in place of the less efficient, wood-fuelled reverberatory furnaces that had been used up to that time. The change would reduce costs and be critical to unlocking the mine's potential, even at lower prevailing copper prices.

The partners began negotiations to operate the mine on tribute and, with Albert Dangar, a son of Henry Dangar, and W. W. Robinson, the Longworths' brother in law, formed the Great Cobar Copper Mining Syndicate in 1894. The syndicate was sometimes referred to as 'the Longworth syndicate', 'the Read-Longworth syndicate', or incorrectly as the 'Reid-Longworth syndicate'.

=== Tribute agreement ===
In January 1894, the Great Cobar Copper Mining Syndicate took over the management and operation of the Great Cobar Mine, under a tribute agreement. The Great Cobar Copper Mining Company still owned the mining leases, and would do so until December 1900.

While the syndicate was working the mine, the Great Cobar Copper Mining Company—taking no active role in the mine or in the sale of its copper—received a royalty payment, which it used to pay a dividend to its shareholders. The royalty paid by the Syndicate was on a sliding scale; 5%, while the price of copper in London of £45 or less per ton, and 7.5% for prices more than £45 but less than £50. For prices above £50, in addition to 7.5%, the company received 8 shillings for each pound increment above £50. In addition to the royalty, there was a minimum annual rental of £500 and a minimum output of 50 tons of ore per day.

In time, the shareholders of the Great Cobar Copper Mining Company were also to benefit greatly from the decision of the Syndicate not to include, in the tribute agreement, an option to purchase the mine for £40,000. That option had been offered by the company and, in hindsight, forgoing it was a costly missed opportunity for the syndicate. However, at the time of the agreement, it seems the Syndicate did not envisage purchasing the assets.

Great Cobar Copper Mining Syndicate took advantage of another circumstance; the copper from Cobar contained around two ounces of gold per ton of copper. Unlike copper, the gold price was absolutely stable, being defined by the gold standard. At low copper prices, the value of the gold well exceeded that of the royalty. Even at high copper prices, the value of the gold contributed significantly to the royalty payment. When the buoyant copper price reached £72 per ton in 1898, the royalty calculation was a massive £14 4s per ton. However, at that copper price, the mine was highly profitable. It has been estimated that, although the syndicate paid £60,000 in royalties, its profit was around £150,000.

=== Operations under tribute agreement (1894–1900) ===
==== Operations at Cobar ====
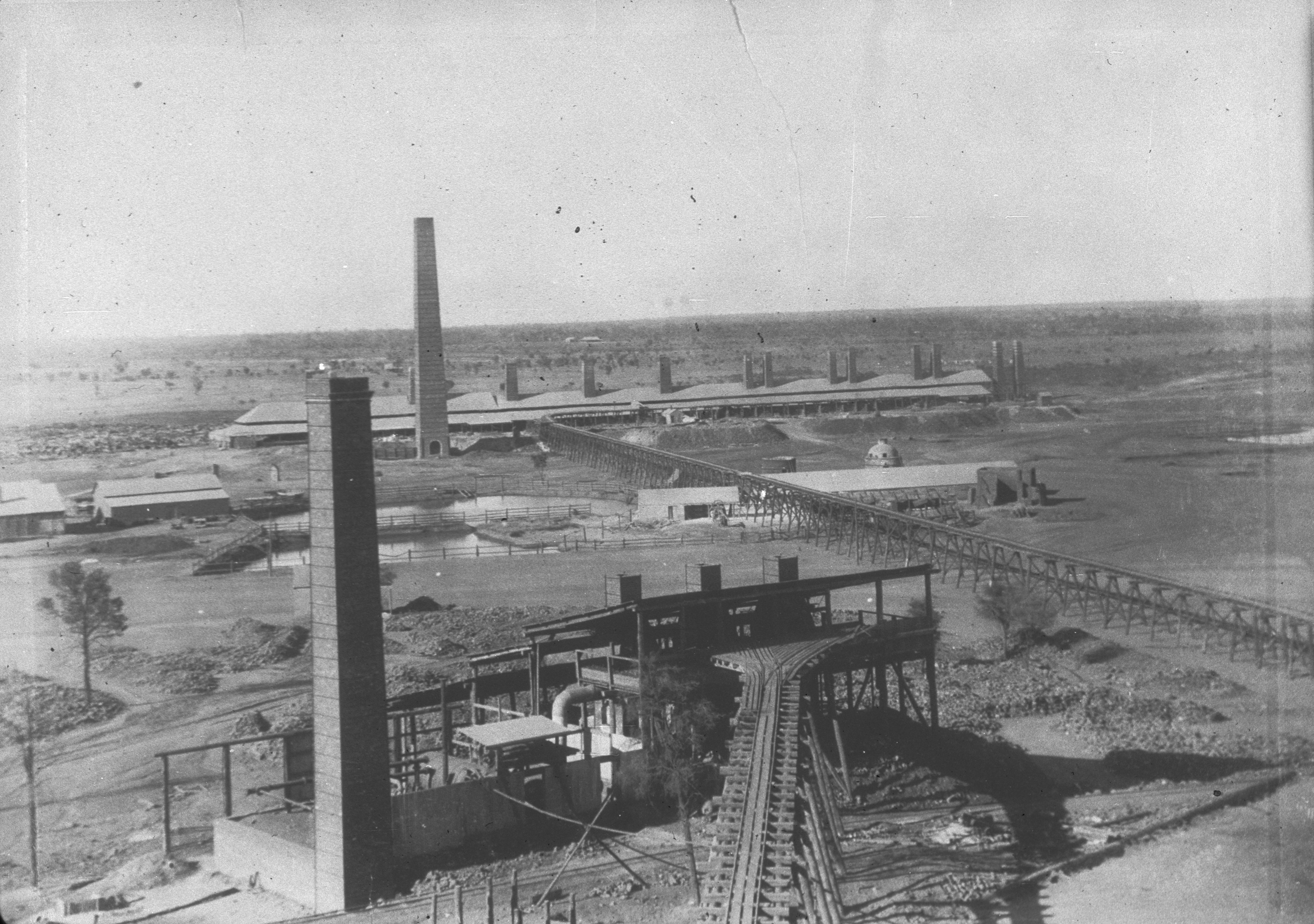
Water jacket furnaces in foreground, old reverberatory furnaces in background (c.1895).

Thomas Longworth relocated to Cobar to manage the operations there. By 1898, there were five water jacket furnaces.

The syndicate built a narrow-gauge industrial tramway within the plant to move ore, coke, and slag between the mine and the smelter site. Initially, coke from Rix's Creek was unloaded at Cobar railway station and then taken from there to a coke dump by carriers. In 1897, a short standard gauge branch line, the Copper Mine Branch, allowed coke to be off-loaded at the Great Cobar coke dump, and the copper matte to be loaded for Lithgow.

Water jacket furnaces at Cobar mine smelter, c.1895

The water jacket furnaces produced copper matte, from a mixture of roasted ore and raw ore. Initially, a portion of the copper matte was refined in the old reverberatory furnaces at Cobar, with the remainder being sent to be refined in Newcastle. The syndicate seems to have considered adding converters at Cobar, which would have converted the matte to blister copper; due to the prevailing low price of copper, that path was not taken.

Instead, by the end of 1896, construction was well advanced on a copper refining plant at Lithgow. By early 1897, the Lithgow plant had seven reverberatory furnaces and one furnace described as a 'refining furnace'.

The Great Cobar ore and copper matte included significant amounts of gold and silver. The Syndicate announced that they would build an electrolytic copper refinery at Lithgow in late 1899. The new electrolytic refinery, which seems to have opened in 1900, allowed the precious metal content to be recovered, while simultaneously upgrading the crude copper produced at the Cobar smelters. William Longworth took charge of this part of the venture, along with the Great Cobar colliery, which was established to supply the refinery with coal for the electricity it needed. Great Cobar became a significant producer of gold and silver. The Lithgow plant also processed copper matte from Nymagee, another mine owned by syndicate members.

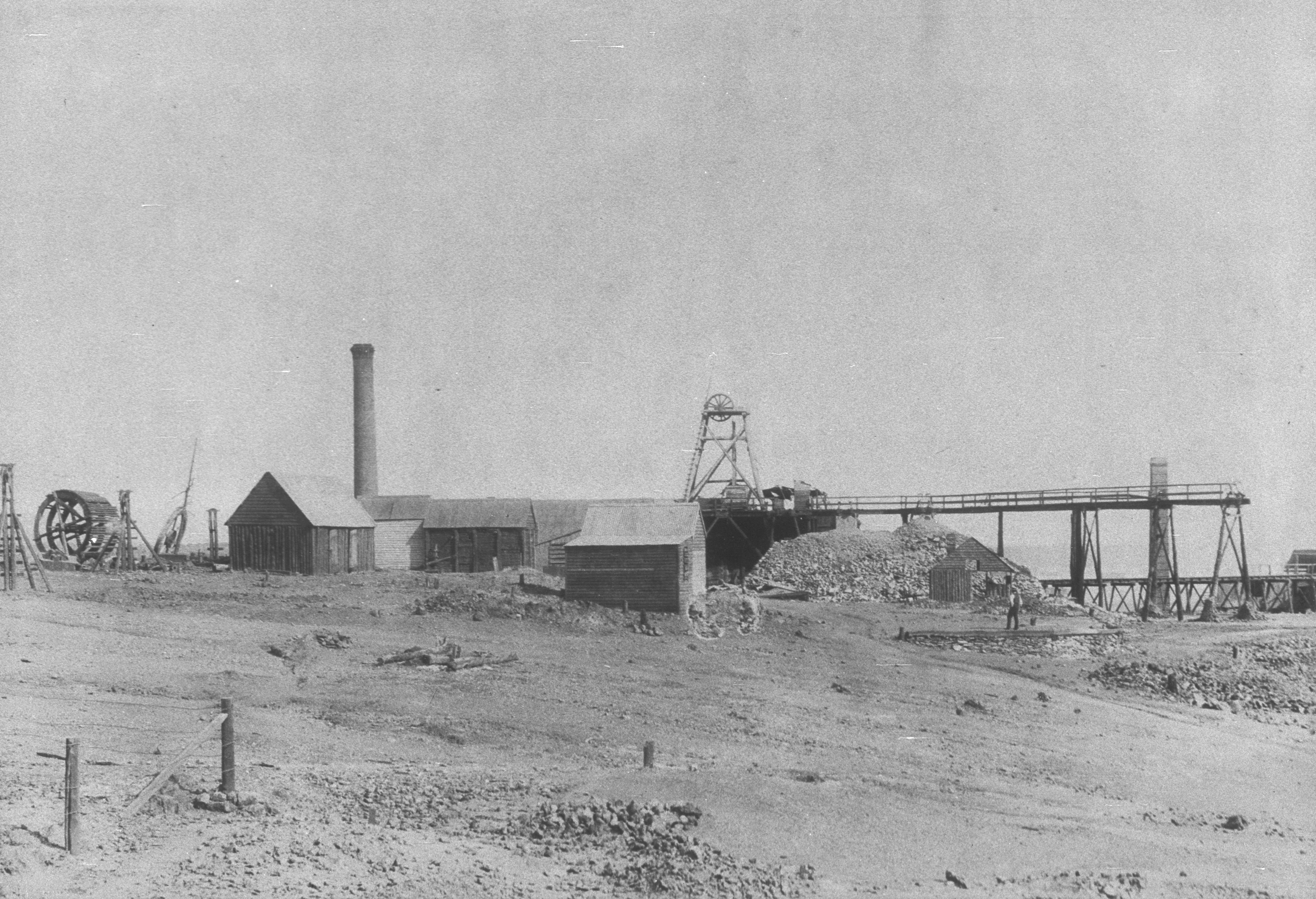
Panoramic view - Left (1895)

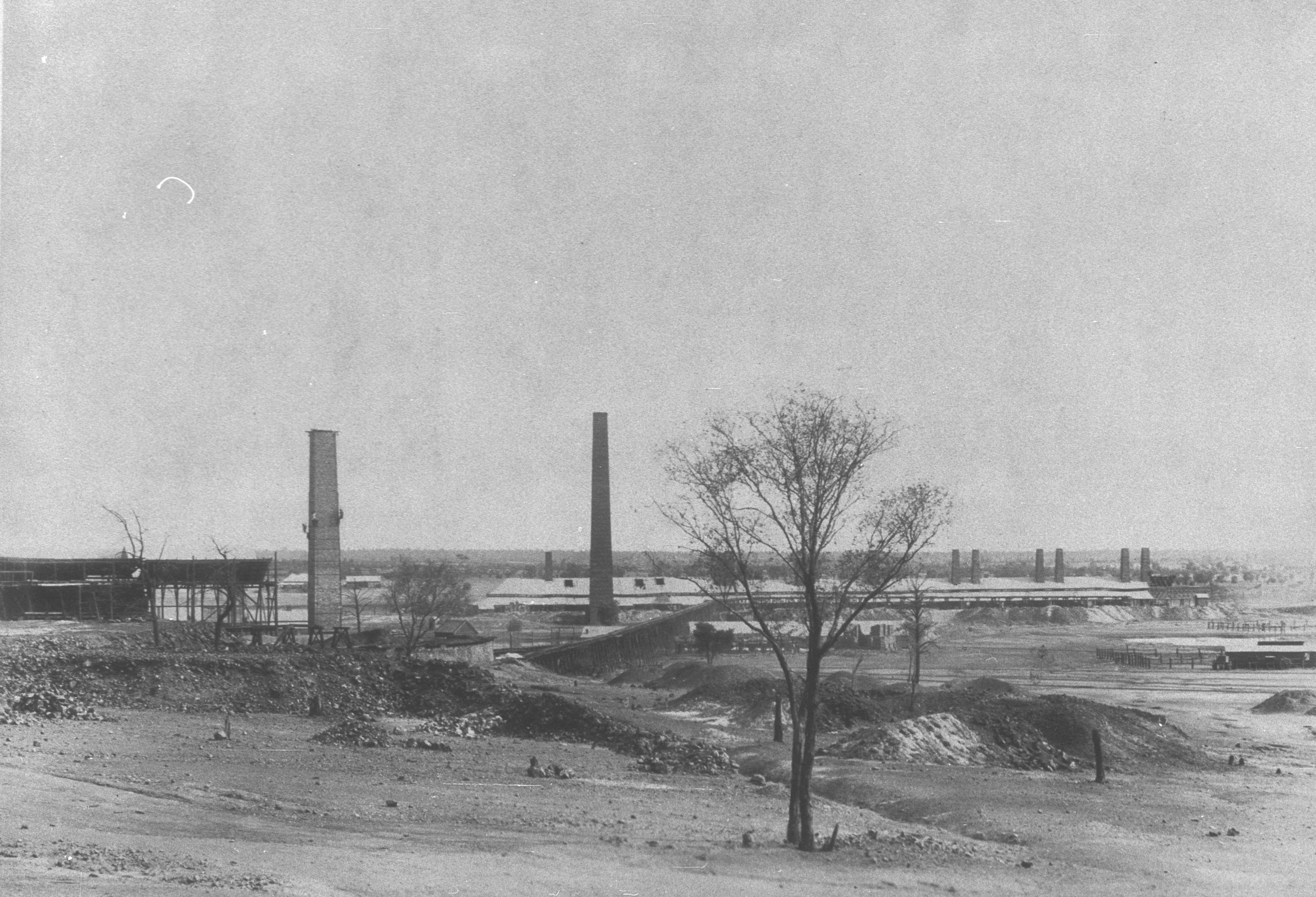
Panoramic view - Right (1895)

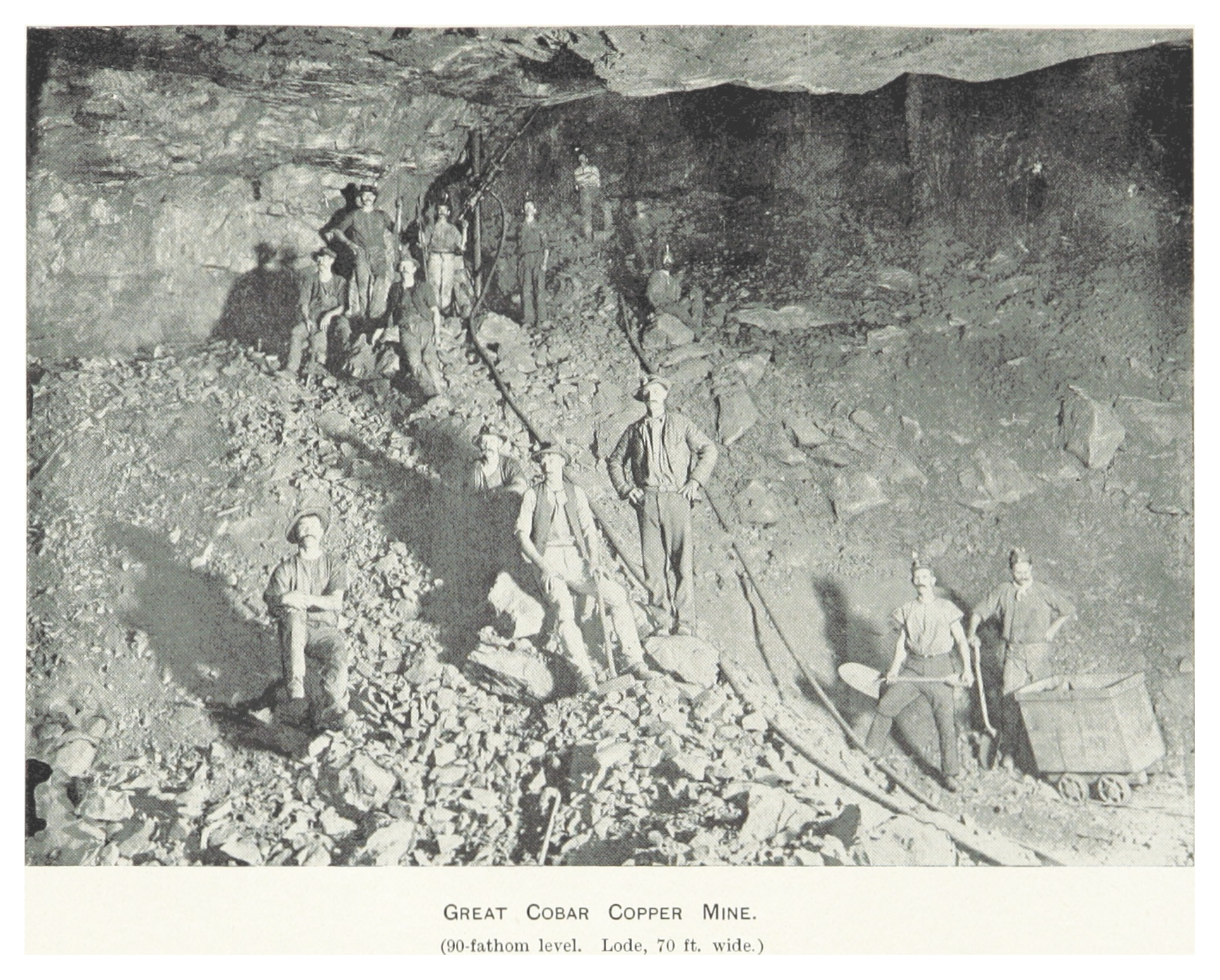
Miners working a 70-foot-wide lode, c.1899.

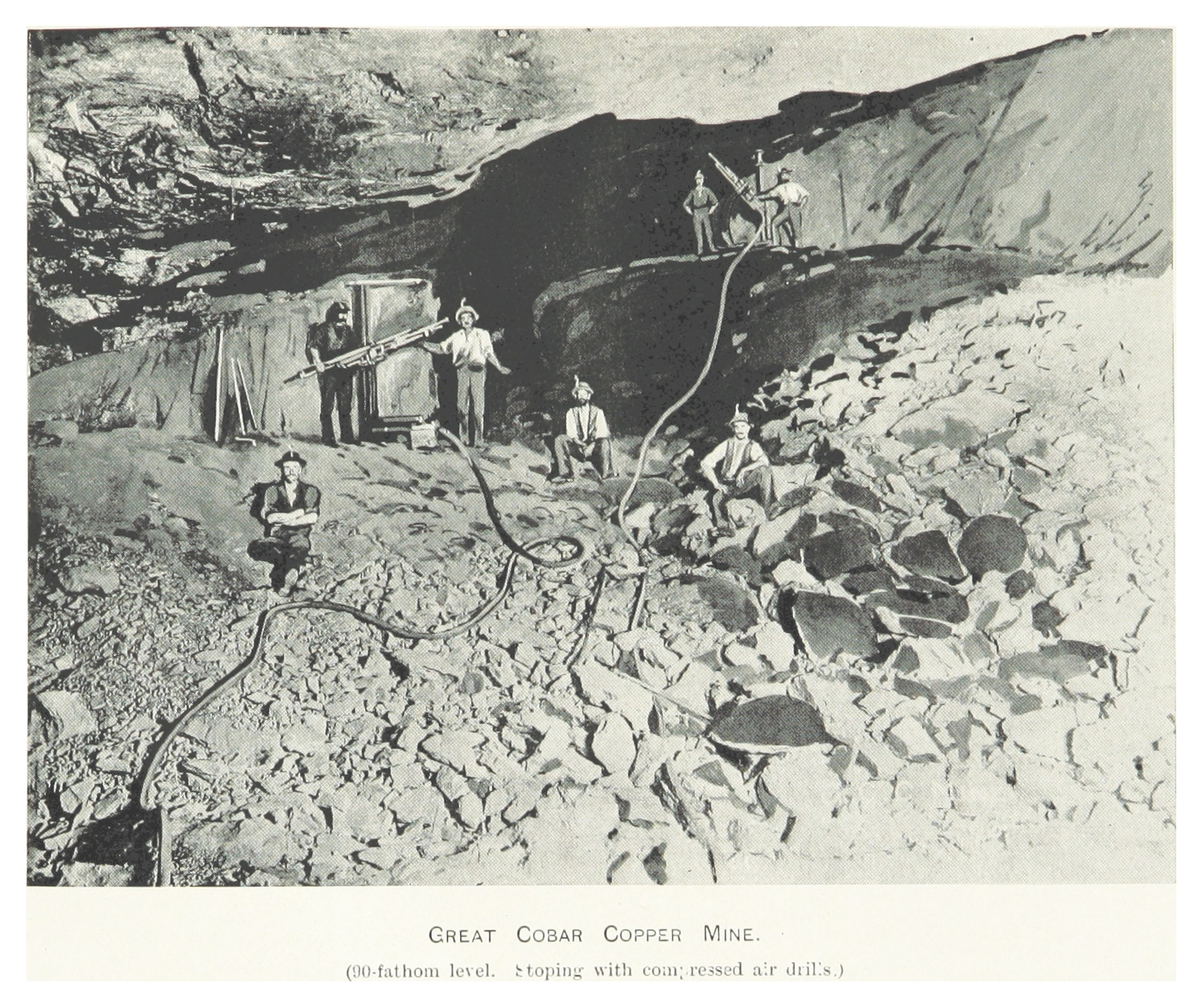
Stope, with compressed air drills in use (1899)

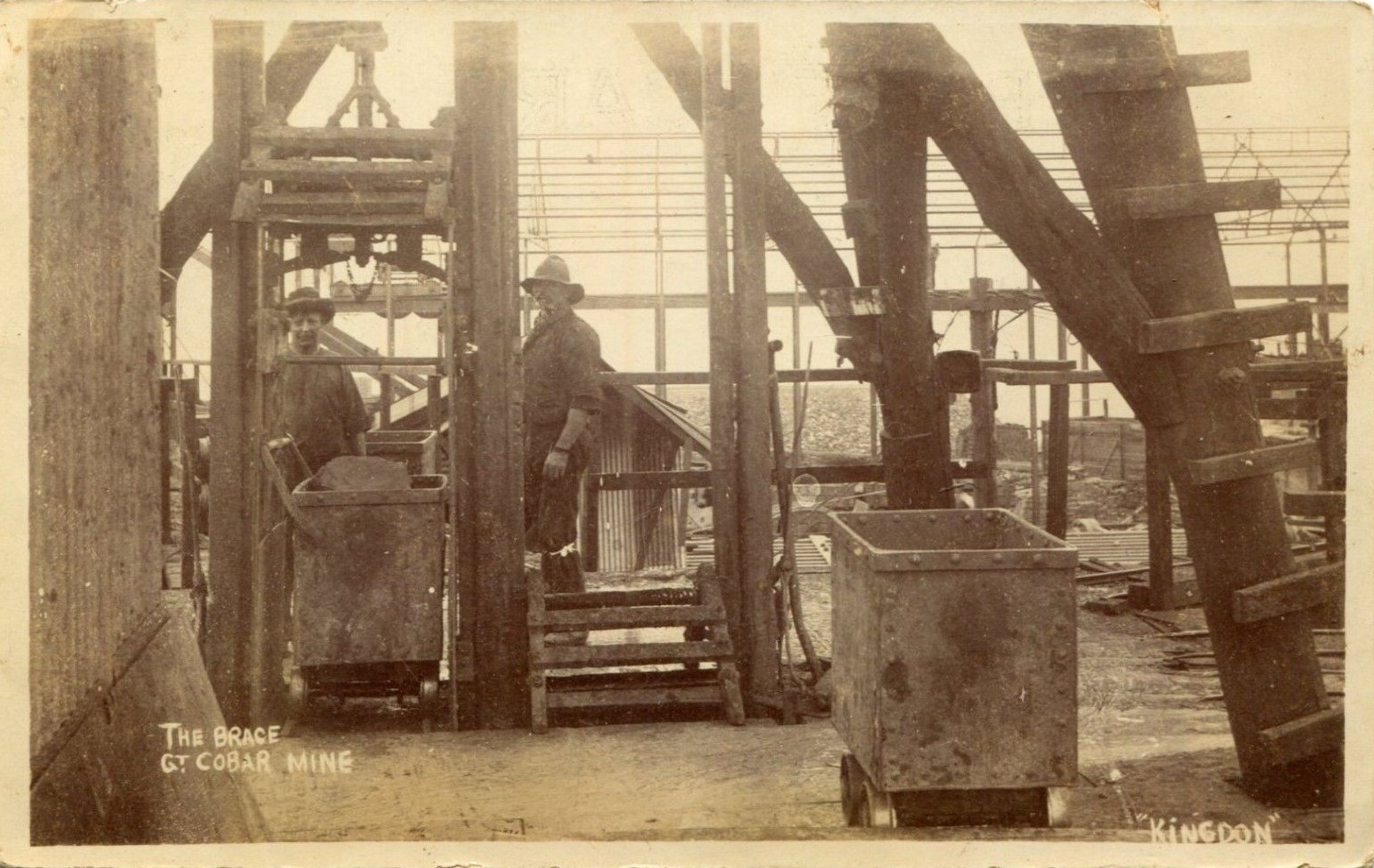
The Brace of Syndicate-era headframe (early 1900s). The building for the Great Cobar Ltd smelter is under construction in the background.

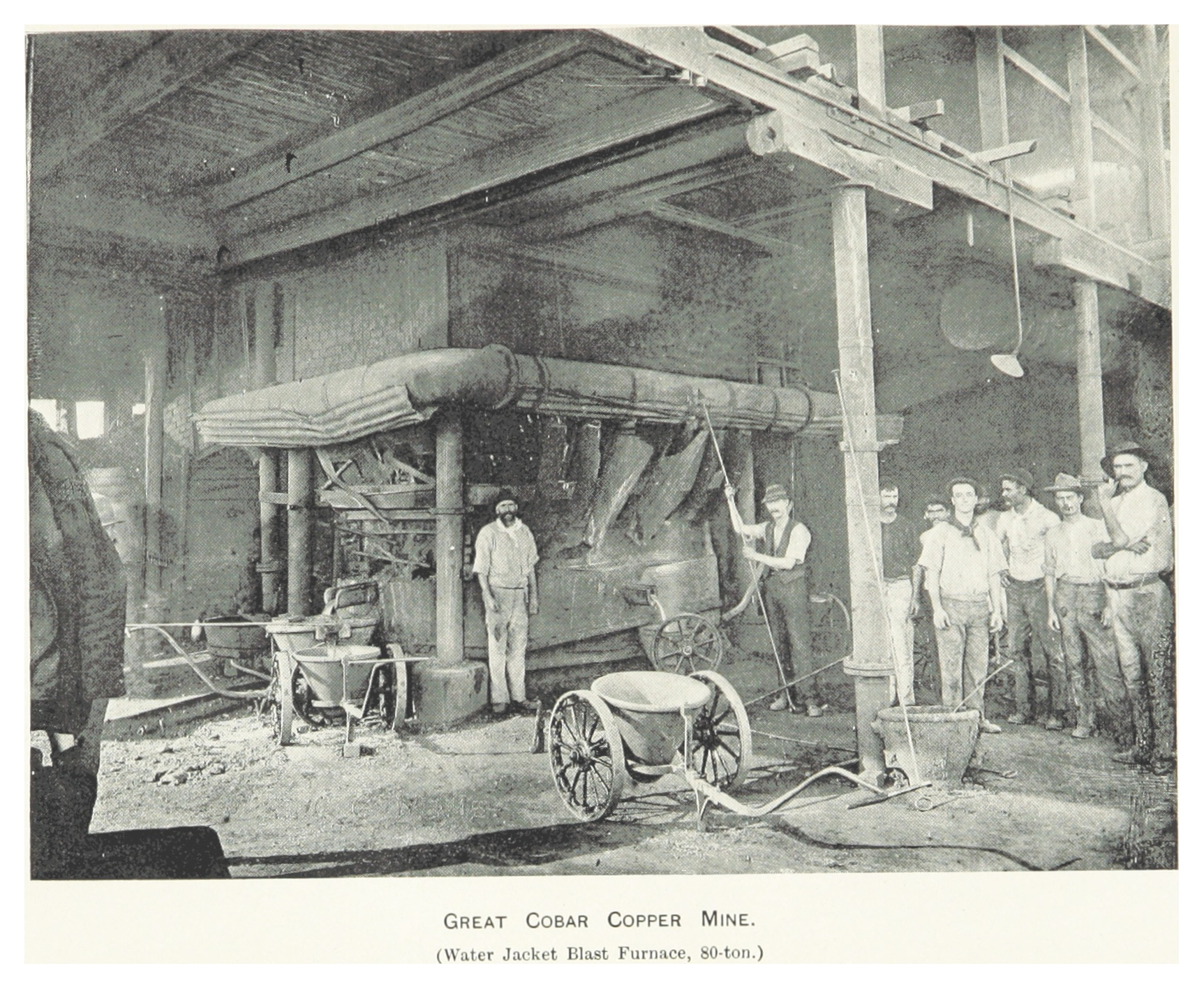
Smelter workers at 80 ton water jacket furnace, c.1899.

==== Electrolytic refining at Lithgow ====
Lithgow became a copper refining centre, driven largely by the presence of cheap fine coal, which could be used in reverberatory furnaces and later to generate the electricity needed for electrolytic refining. The first Lithgow copper venture was a smelter and refinery there, owned by Lewis Lloyd.

The copper matte (later also blister copper) from Cobar was first melted and further refined in the anode refinery furnace, to around 99.4% copper. The molten copper was then ladled into anode moulds. The cast-copper anodes were then taken to the electrolytic section of the refinery, which consisted of 140 insulated tanks, each with an anode and a cathode. Direct current was applied between the anode and cathode. The copper in the anode was redeposited onto the thin copper cathode, while the other metals and compounds (mainly gold, silver, arsenic, bismuth, and antimony) settled, with some copper, as a greenish-black sludge at the bottom of the tank. The copper cathodes were then melted and cast into ingots of refined copper.

The valuable sludge from the tanks was boiled in sulphuric acid to remove residual copper. What remained in solid form was then melted in a cupel furnace, after adding some silica sand and sodium carbonate, and cast into small ingots. Those ingots, known Dore bullion, consisted of a mixture of gold and silver, which were later separated into pure gold and silver, by electrolysis.

Lithgow Refinery

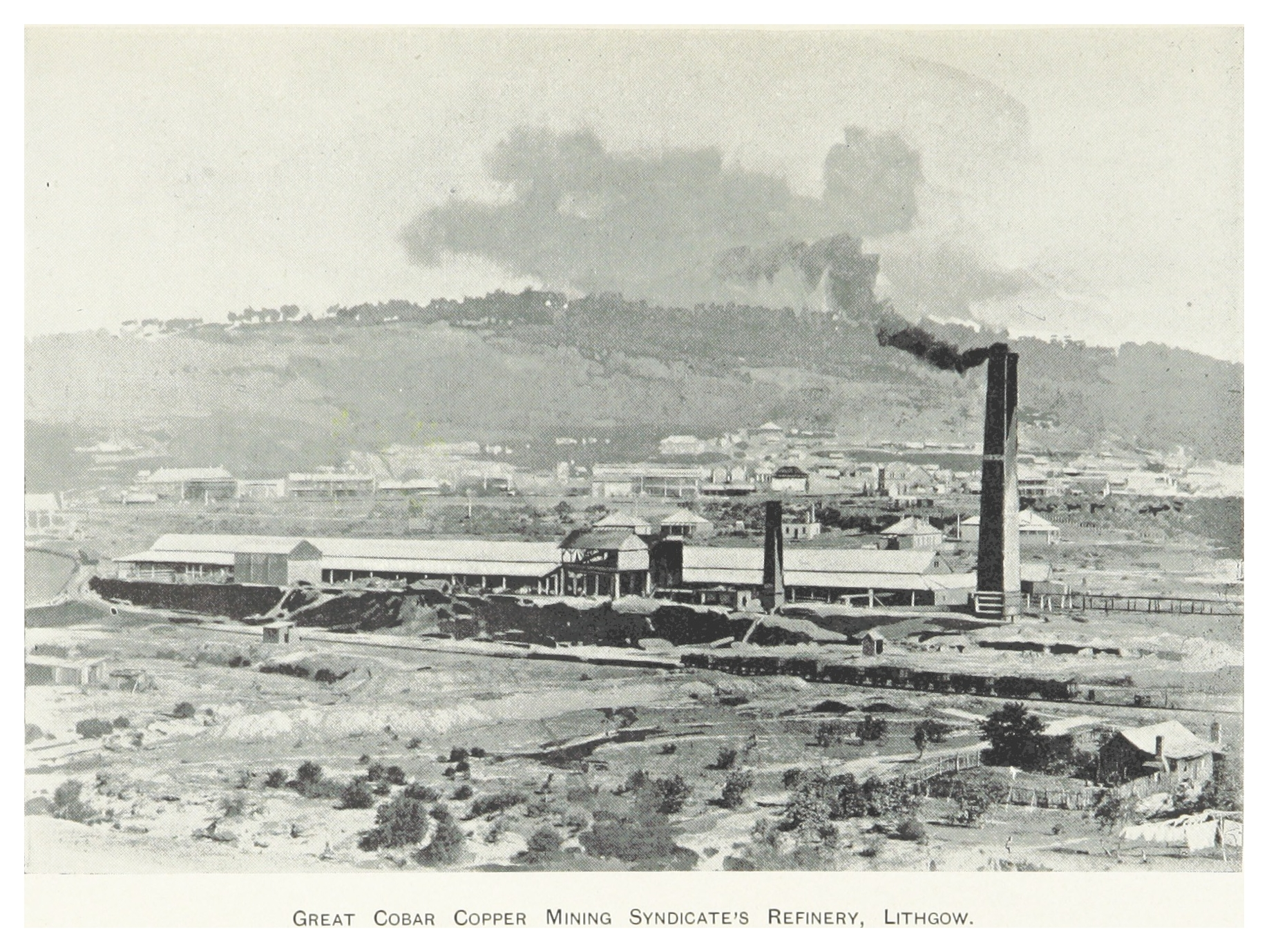
Lithgow Refinery (c1899)

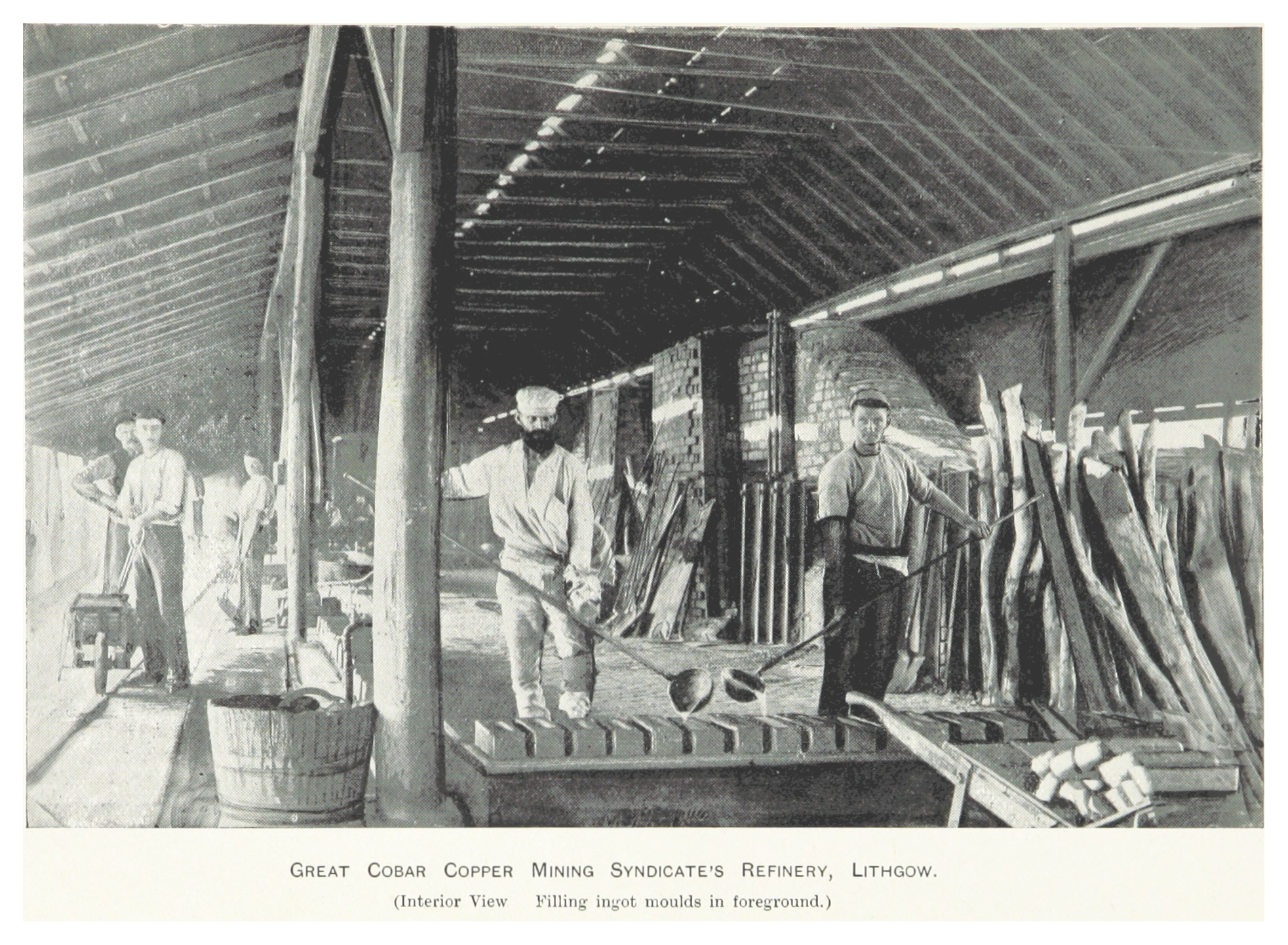
Casting Ingots at Lithgow Refinery (c.1899)

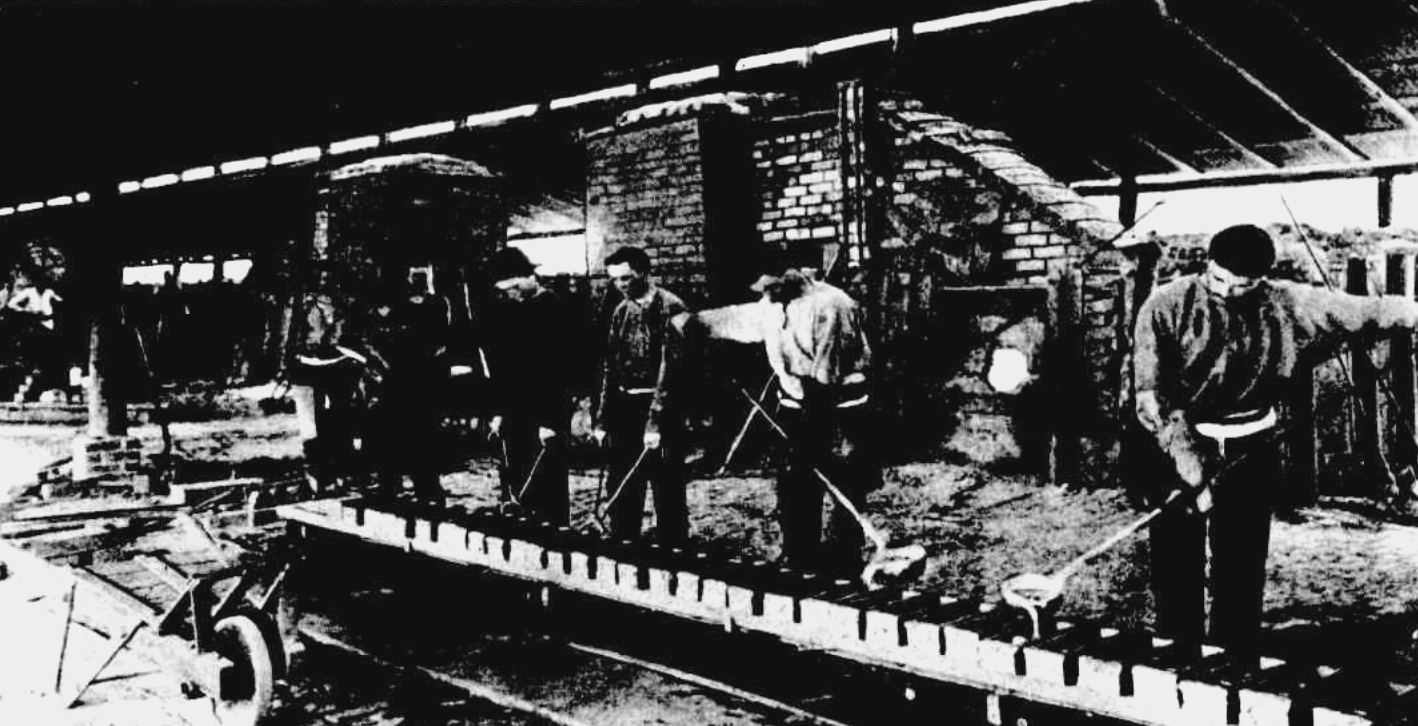
Ladling copper into moulds (c.1902)

=== Purchase of the mine ===
The tribute agreement was due to expire in 1900, but was extended. The Great Cobar Mining Company granted the Syndicate an option to purchase the Great Cobar mine and its other properties, for a sum of £500,000, up to 15 June 1902. If the option were exercised before that date, the Syndicate would be compensated by adjusting the purchase price for the shortening of the term of the tribute agreement at a rate of £90,000 for each year lost.

With copper prices around £70 per ton, the syndicate bought the mine outright, taking ownership on 12 December 1900, ending the tribute agreement and thereby eliminating the royalty payments. The purchase price was around £315,000, but it seems that the payment was spread over several years. Although much more costly than the forgone purchase option of 1894, at prevailing copper prices, it seemed a reasonable price.

The outcome was good for the vendor. In 1903, the Great Cobar Mining Company declared a dividend of £4 per share, totalling £320,000.

=== The crisis of 1902 ===
Soon after the purchase, copper prices fell, putting the Lithgow operations in jeopardy. By the end of 1901, it had fallen to only £48 15s. per ton, close to the cost of production at Great Cobar that year, which Dr. Richard Read stated was over £49 per ton. He described the situation as 'hopeless'. Cobar was a distant victim of a copper market manipulation. Amalgamated Copper Company began selling copper below market price in October 1901 to force down the copper price and drive smaller producers out of the market.

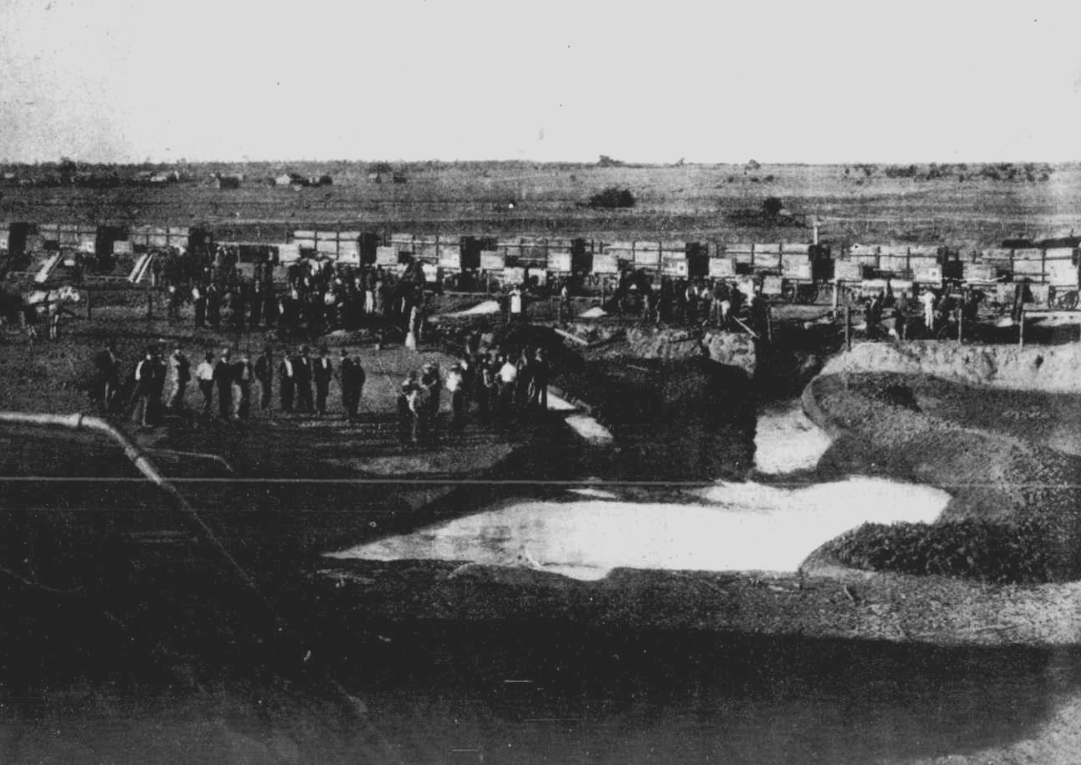
Water train discharging water for the Great Cobar mine tank (1902)

Compounding the impact of the plunging copper price, the Federation Drought badly affected Cobar.

The copper price manipulation failed, when the independent producers stopped selling into the low-priced market; Amalgamated Copper could not maintain its artificially low price. By early February 1902, copper had risen to £57 per ton and by April seemed likely to remain above £60 per ton.

To prevent the closing of the operations and 600 men losing their jobs, the Syndicate persuaded the railway commissioners to supply water by train from Warren, on Macquarie River, during the worst seven months of 1902, and also to reduce rail freight rates. Water trains carrying around 26,000 gallons of water ran several times per week, and were emptied into a specially dug excavation on the eastern side of the Peak branch railway, from where it was presumably pumped to the Great Cobar's 'tank', actually a type of excavated reservoir. Fortunately, good rains in November 1902 ended the drought at Cobar.

=== An option to buy ===
The difficult situation from October 1901 to November 1902 likely gave the Syndicate the impetus to sell its copper business if a good price could be obtained for the assets. Various transactions were initiated, but none were completed.

In a move that was to have further consequences, in May 1902—by then, the copper price had recovered—an option to purchase the Great Cobar assets was granted to a syndicate of London investors, headed by A.S Joseph. As a consequence of negotiating the option, the assets were valued at £1,006,000, but the option lapsed in 1903.

=== George Blakemore ===
George Henry Blakemore (1868–1941) was born at Copperfield, a copper-mining village that is now a ghost town, four miles south-west of Clermont, Queensland. His father, William Blakemore, was in charge of the Peak Downs Copper Mining Company, the first copper mine in Queensland, and later the copper mine at Nymagee.

Blakemore's career began in Broken Hill, as a metallurgical assayer, in 1888. He was made bankrupt in 1891, while working as a metallurgist of the British Broken Hill mine. He was later an assistant manager at the Broken Hill Proprietary mine and eventually was in charge of its eighteen smelting furnaces.

In 1895, he married Dura Maude, the younger of the two daughters of John Howell, a Canadian-born naturalized-American mining engineer and mining industry figure. Howell came to Broken Hill in 1889 to serve as the general manager of the British Broken Hill mine. From 1890 to 1895, Howell had been general manager of the Broken Hill Proprietary and Block 10 mines. After he left Broken Hill, Howell established and managed the Conrad mine, near Inverell. The mining village near that mine was named Howell, after him.

Blakemore was subsequently associated with various ventures in which his father-in-law was also involved. He was first in charge of the erection and operation of the Dapto Smelting Works of the Smelting Company of Australia, at what is now Kanahooka, near Dapto, until June 1898. He later was manager of the Prince of Wales gold mine near Gundagai, N.S.W., and he was also general manager of that mine's owner, Howell's Consolidated Goldmines. After that, he was in charge of the Einasleigh Copper Mine and Smelter in Queensland.

He returned to New South Wales when his father-in-law became ill to stand in as manager of the Conrad mine. In 1901, George Blackmore became mine manager of the Great Cobar Mine, later becoming its general manager in 1905.

Blakemore had a grand vision for the Great Cobar, involving a new shaft and a huge expansion of the smelter, and greatly increased production. Although the new shaft would not be completed under Syndicate management, the years of Blakemore's management would see an expansion of Great Cobar's operations.

In the final years of the Great Cobar's ownership by the Great Cobar Mining Syndicate, there were reports of attempts to sell it, but no sale was completed. If such a sale were to take place, the rewards for the Great Cobar Mining Syndicate members would be immense. It was well known that the Syndicate intended to sell the Great Cobar.

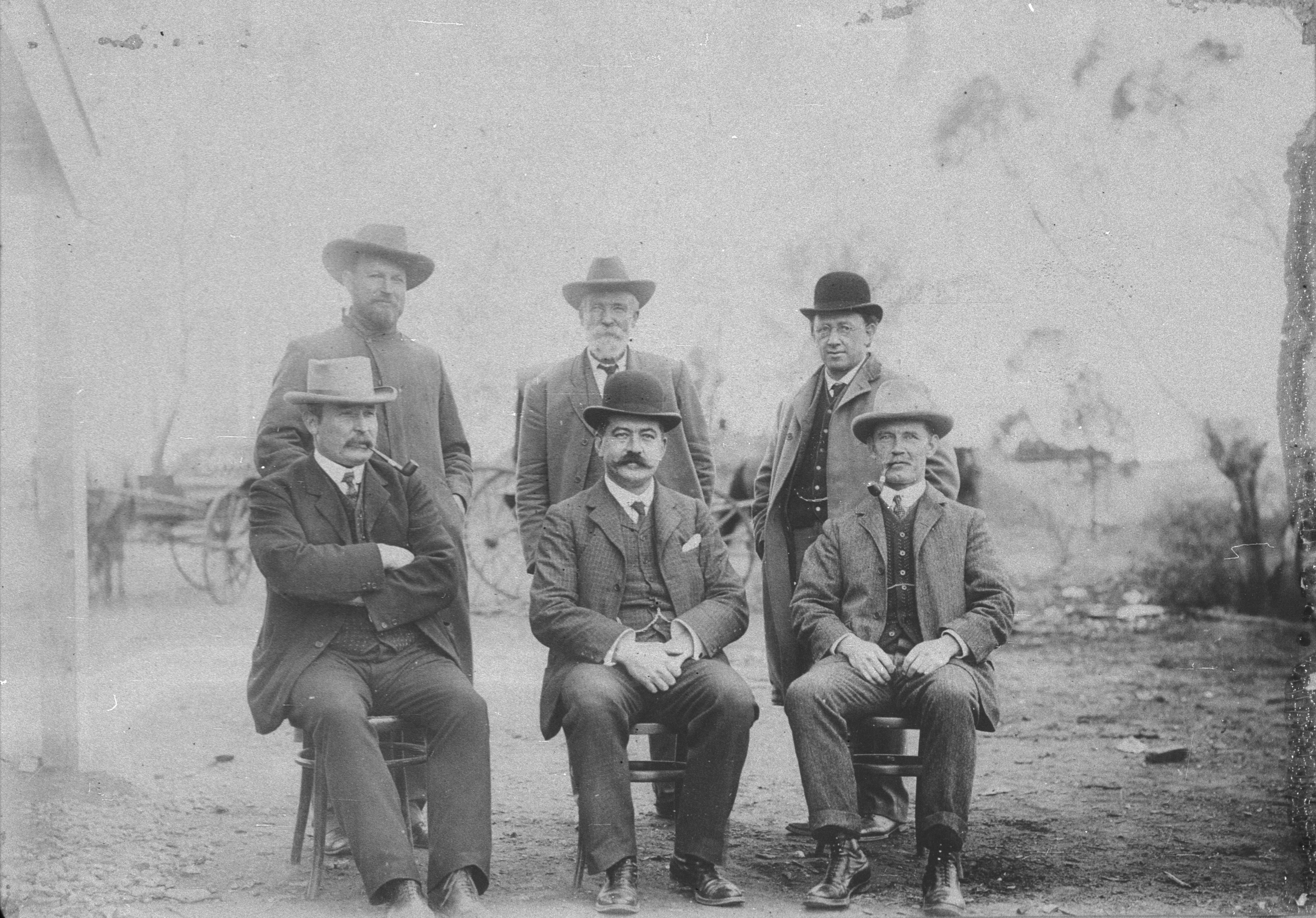
Directors of C.S.A. Mines Limited, c.1912. George Blakemore is seated in the centre. From 1905 to 1909, the general manager of Great Cobar, by 1916, he had become its nemesis.

In 1905, Blakemore, probably attempting to emulate the success of the Great Cobar Mining Syndicate, established the C.S.A. Development Syndicate, to take over the then moribund CSA Mine, at what would become Elouera. Exploration work at the C.S.A. Mine soon revealed a sizable lead-zinc deposit, and a new company, C.S.A. Mines Limited, was floated. The members of the C.S.A. Development Syndicate, including Blakemore, received a large proportion of the shares in the new company. Blakemore was a director of that new company's board, and another member of that first board was Dr Richard Read, a member of the Great Cobar Mining Syndicate.

When the Great Cobar Mine was sold to new owners in 1906, Blakemore remained its General Manager. Blakemore was dismissed from his position at Great Cobar in 1909. During 1911, he visited Mexico and wrote newspaper articles about his trip, including events in the city of Juárez soon after its capture by rebels, during the Mexican Revolution. He remained in the Cobar region and became a vocal critic of Great Cobar's operations and management.

In late 1910, a large lode of copper ore was identified in the C.S.A. Mine. It joined with the neighbouring Tinto Mine, in 1912, emerging for the first time as a major mine in the Cobar region. Also in 1912, Blakemore became a director of a new company to work the Iodide Mine, at Mineral Hill.

Probably his last involvement with mining in the Cobar region was as a member of the board of New Occidental Gold Mining Company Limited, operators of the New Occidental Mine at Wrightville. He joined the board in 1936. He died at Burwood, in 1941.

=== Further expansion (1901–1905) ===
Robert Sticht of the Mt Lyell Mining and Railway Company, in Tasmania, had successfully achieved fully pyritic smelting of copper ore. Pyritic smelting used the sulfur and iron in the chalcopyrite ore as fuel in a water-jacketed furnace with a cold blast. Not only did it eliminate the need to roast the ore before smelting, but it also allowed the ore to be smelted without coke. To improve the reliability of the process, Stitcht used a small amount (1%) of coke in the furnace feed. Stichts' achievement—after about six years of incremental progress—may not have been truly a world first or even the first in Australia, but it was very influential, especially for mines with similar chalcopyrite ore, such as Great Cobar.

George Blakemore designed an experimental furnace based on technology similar to that of Mt Lyell. The furnace was successfully commissioned in November 1902, with a capacity to smelt 200 tons of ore per day, increasing to 340 tons per day in 1903. Cobar would only achieve partial pyritic smelting, but the new furnaces improved the economics of the operation greatly, particularly by eliminating the need to roast any of the ore before smelting and reducing the amount of coke used. Until 1902, slag pots had been moved manually on a narrow-gauge tramway; as production increased, this operation was horse-powered.

The Syndicate built two large water-jacket furnaces, based on the Mount Lyell designs, one in 1903 and another in 1905. These were capable of smelting 400 tons of raw ore per day. The experimental furnace was re-erected at a different location in 1905, providing three modern large furnaces. The 80-ton water-jacket furnaces and old reverberatory furnaces were demolished. Four steam locomotives, used previously on the narrow-gauge firewood tramways, were refurbished in 1903 and took the place of horses hauling slag pots around 1904.

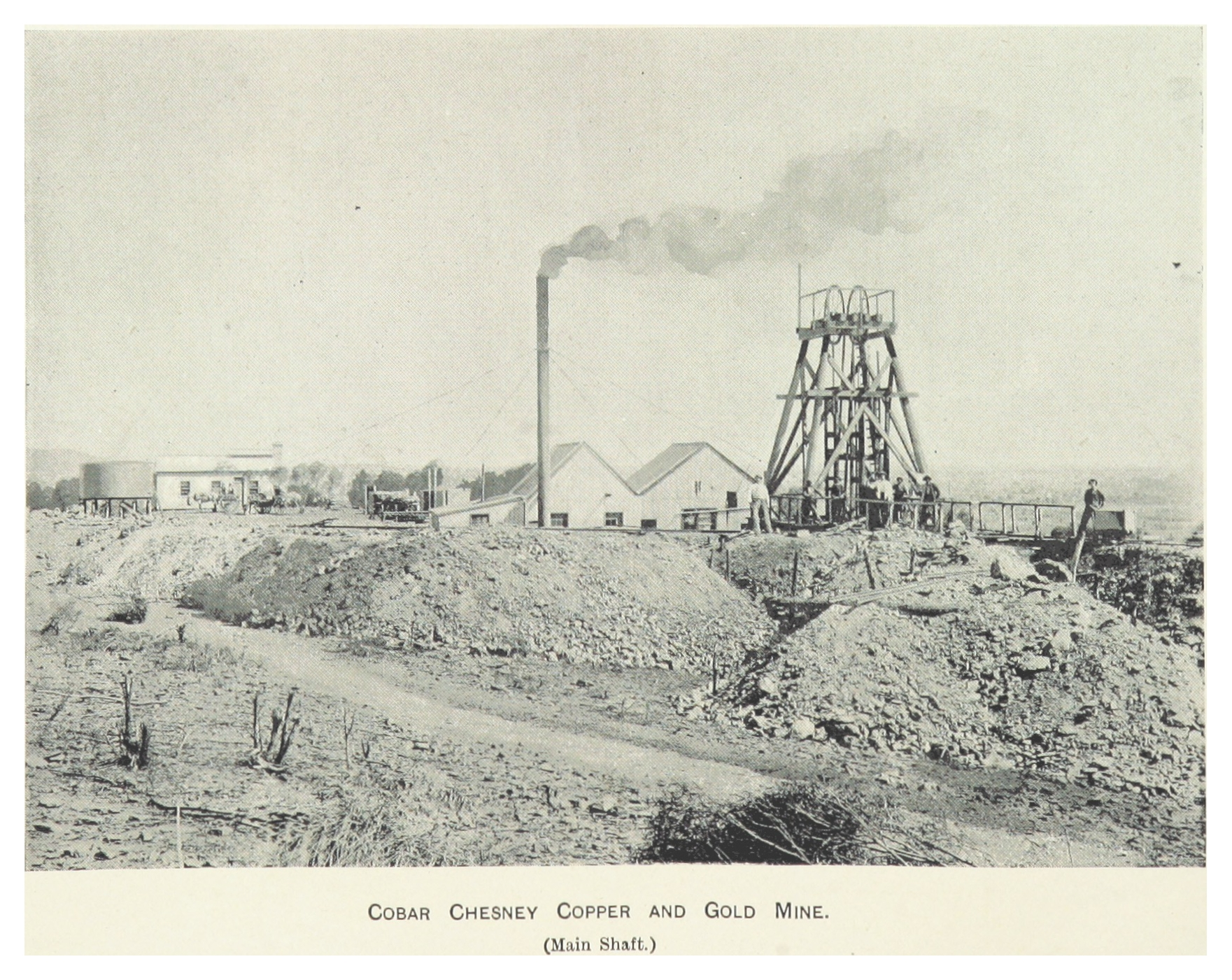
Chesney Mine (1899)

In 1901, a longer branch railway line was opened, from a junction on the Copper Mine Branch near Cobar to the Occidental Mine at Wrightville. Called the Peak Branch, it would never be extended to the Peak mine, as was originally planned. The Peak Branch had sidings at the Great Cobar mine (the rest of the old Copper Mine Branch) and Chesney Mine, allowing ore from the Chesney Mine to be carried to the Great Cobar smelters more readily. This was an important development because the 'siliceous' ore, copper ore from the Chesney mine, could be used as a flux when smelting the 'basic' ores, Great Cobar, improving the economics of the smelting operation by reducing the amount of limestone needed. This idea probably also had been taken from Mt Lyell, because the 'siicaceous' ores of the North Mount Lyell mine had been combined with the 'basic' ore of the Mt Lyell mine, for a similar purpose.

In 1904, the syndicate bought the Chesney Mine—initially a gold mine but, as the depth increased, increasingly a copper mine— and they had owned the Nymagee Copper Mine, since 1896, and the Peak Gold Mine, since at least 1898.

Great Cobar in 1905

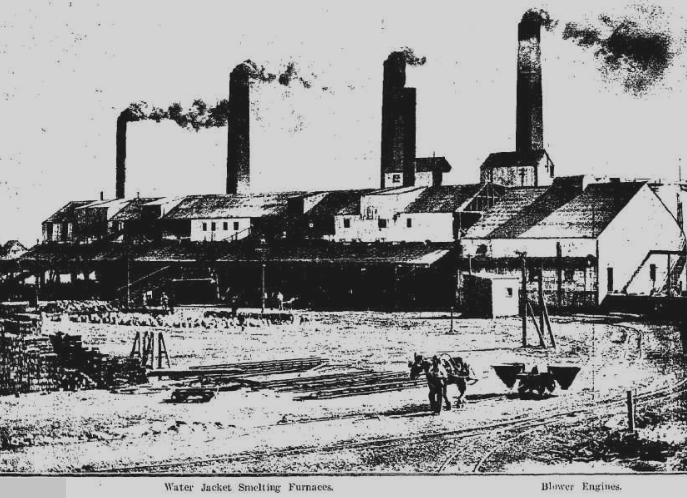
Left side of panoramic view of Great Cobar (1905).

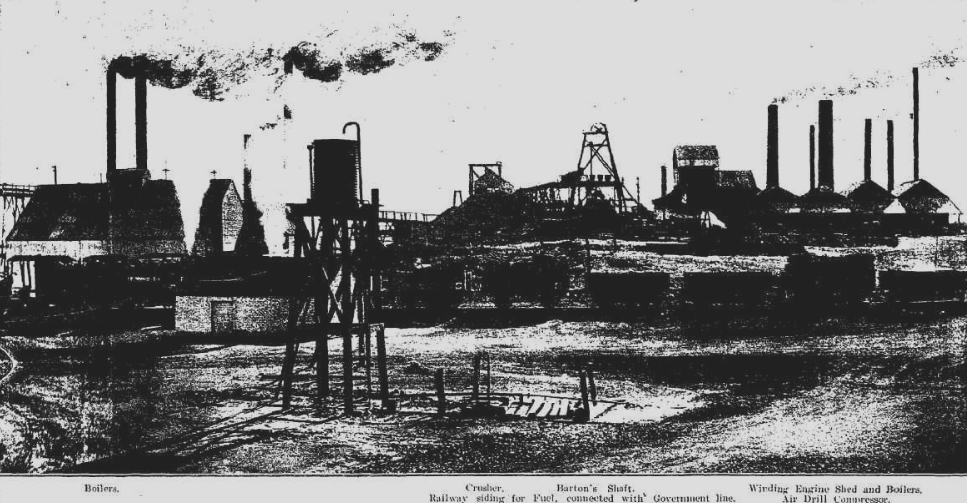
Right side of panoramic view of Great Cobar (1905)

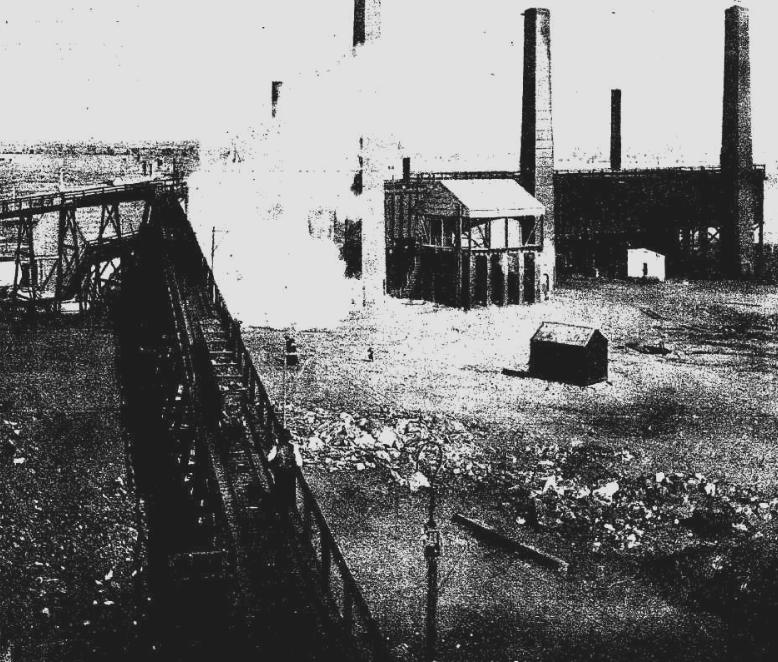
Tramway from crusher bins to furnace ore bins (1905)

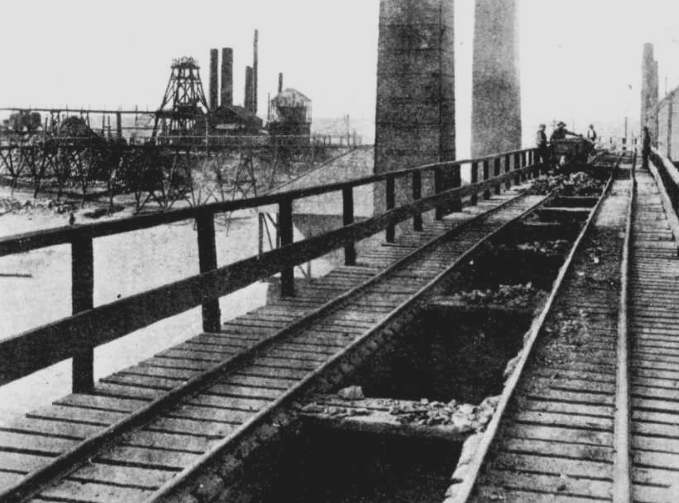
Narrow-gauge tramway over ore bins at furnaces (1905)

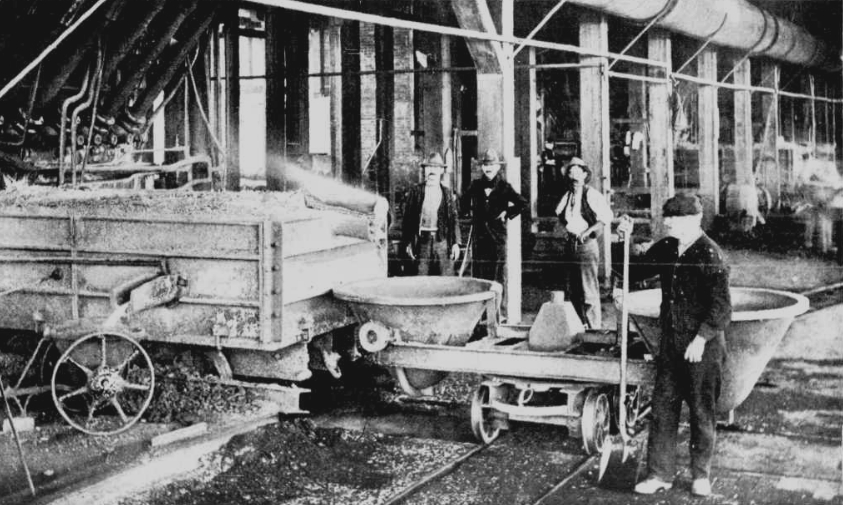
Pouring slag at water jacket furnace (1905). Copper matte is being tapped into the smaller vessel on the left (lower spout).

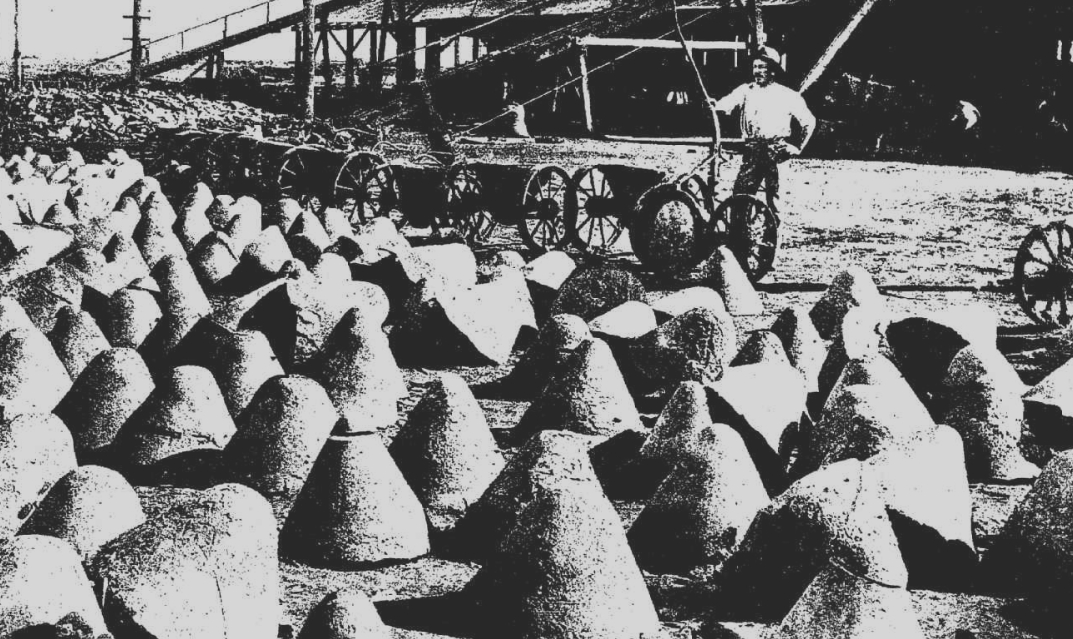
Copper matte awaiting shipment to Lithgow (1905)

=== Sale and aftermath ===
William Longworth retired as the managing director of the Syndicate in early 1905, and his replacement in that role was Dr Richard Read. By this time, the negotiations to sell the assets were well advanced. The prospective buyers were the same London investors, headed by A.S. Joseph, who had previously held the option to buy the assets that was granted in 1902. Both parties were aware of the 1902 valuation of the assets at £1,000,060.

In 1906, the Syndicate was sold to the promoters of the English firm Great Cobar Ltd for £800,000 in cash, which was divided among the six principals. The sale did not include the Nymagee Copper Mine, which was sold to other English investors in 1907. Also in 1906, the former owner of the Great Cobar, the old Cobar Copper-Mining Company, completed its liquidation and winding up.

On 14 August 1906, the promoters of Great Cobar Ltd gave Dr Richard Read, Chairman of the Syndicate, a cheque for £775,000 as final payment, which, together with an earlier deposit of £25,000, amounted to the £800,000 purchase price.

The principals of the Syndicate then set up Australian Woollen Mills in 1908 and made a second fortune, especially by making khaki uniforms for the Australian Army during World War I. Thomas Longworth was the chairman, and William Longworth was a director. All the principals became very wealthy by the standards of their day. At their deaths, the estates of both Longworth brothers and of Albert Dangar each were in excess of £300,000, and that of Dr Richard Read over £136,000.

Woollahra House, just before its demolition (1929).

Thomas Longworth bought Woollahra House, a very large estate on land now comprising some of the most desirable harbourside real estate in Sydney's Eastern Suburbs. He lived there until he died in 1927, after which the house was demolished, and the land was subdivided. The gatehouse of the estate survives, as Rose Bay police station. Thomas Longworth was interred at South Head Cemetery.

One of Thomas Longworth's sons was William (Bill) Longworth (1892–1969), later a prominent businessman. Ass a young man, Bill a competitive swimmer, who completed at the 1912 Olympic Games, qualifying for but missing the 100m final and 1500m semi-finals due to illness. He was an early exponent of the freestyle swimming technique known as the 'Australian crawl'.

William Longworth first lived at 'Rockleigh', in Point Piper—it sold for more than $80 million in 2024—and owned a horse stud farm, 'Dulwich', near Singleton, as well as a large portfolio of other real estate, some collieries, and his share of Australian Woollen Mills. He made many philanthropic gifts to various causes in the Hunter region. In his later years, he retired to Karuah—his riverside home on 30 acres was called 'Glenroy'—and it was there that he died, in 1928, after a long illness. He was buried in the cemetery at Whittingham, where his parents also lie.

Both brothers owned steam yachts. Thomas's was Cobar, and William's was Ena, which survives as a rare example of this type of vessel.

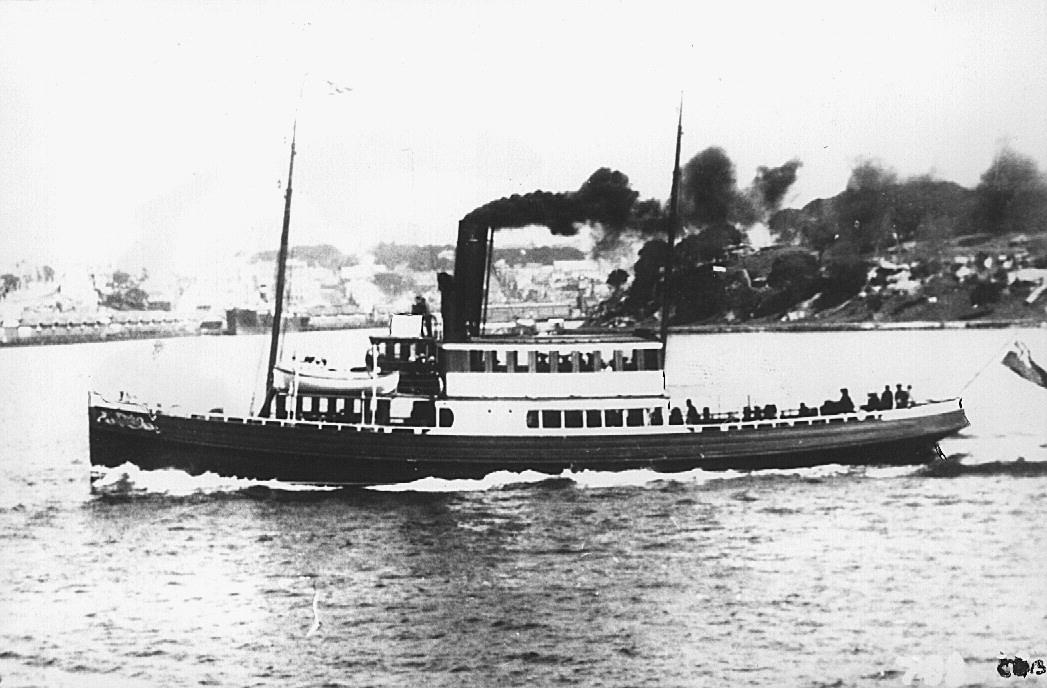
Cobar on Sydney Harbour (1904)

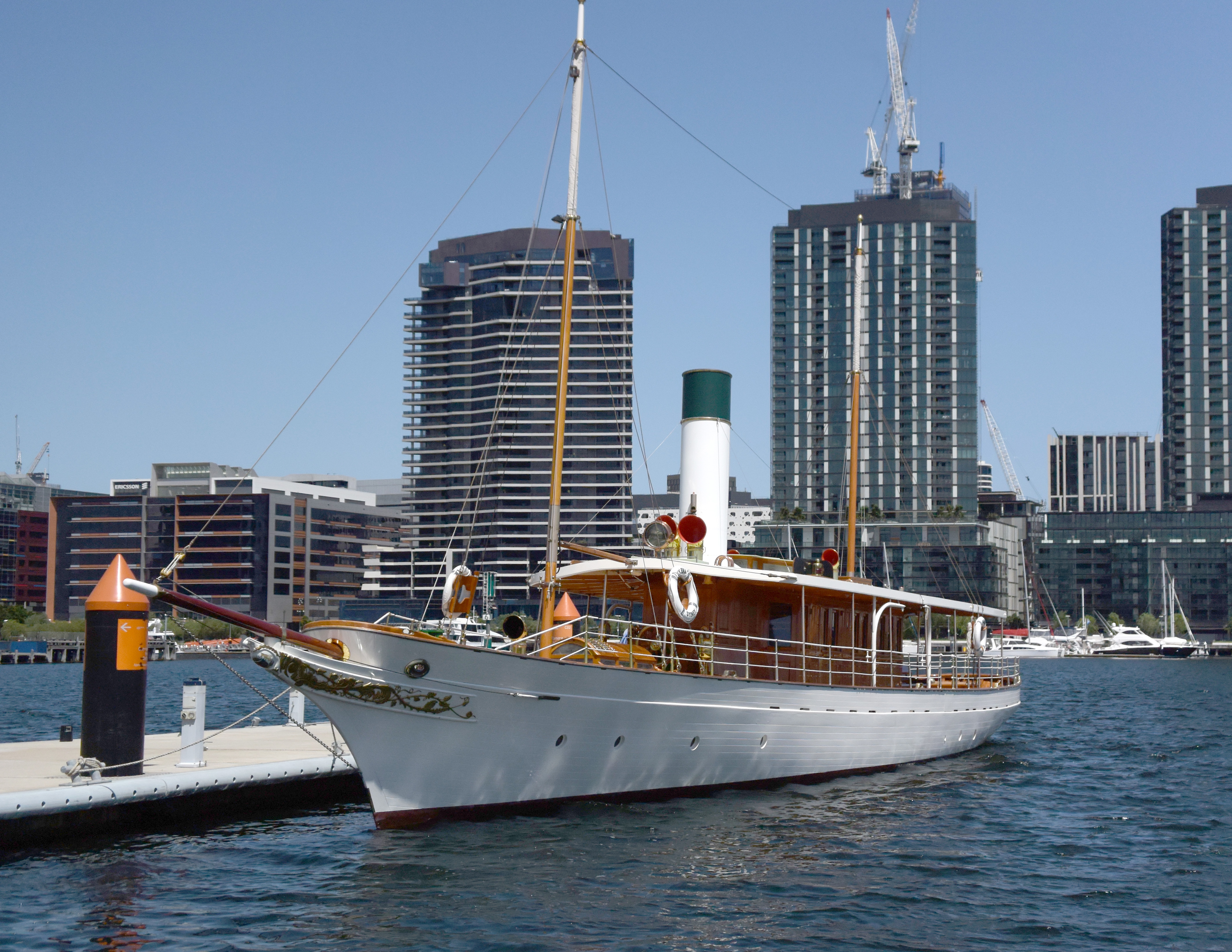
Ena in Melbourne (2015)

== Great Cobar Limited (1906–1914) ==
=== New owners ===
In the two decades before the outbreak of the First World War, British investors were seeking opportunities outside the United Kingdom. The purchase of the Great Cobar was one of several large investments in Australia that involved acquiring existing assets to improve or expand them. Such investments, in New South Wales, included British Australian Oil Company, Commonwealth Oil Corporation, Dapto Smelting Works, Mount Boppy Gold Mine, and the Prince of Wales Mine. A few, such as the Sons of Gwalia mine in Western Australia, were long-lived, fabulous earners, and others like the Mount Boppy or the various companies of the Collins House Group, at Broken Hill, were highly remunerative. However, some eventually were financially unsuccessful, some were also heavily over-capitalised, and some were ill-conceived from the outset; all three would be the case for the new company, Great Cobar Limited.

Great Cobar Limited was registered in England, in 1906, to take over and operate the assets of the Great Cobar Mining Syndicate. 150,000 new £5 shares and £750,000 in 6% debentures were authorised, being new share capital and debenture debt in a capital structure totalling £1,500,000; not all of this amount was issued at the time.

=== Company float, forecasts, and debenture debt ===
On 15 May 1906, the promoters of the new company, in the name of Mr. Hugh Woolner, a London stockbroker, bought assets from the Great Cobar Mining Syndicate for £800,000 in cash. The assets acquired included the refinery at Lithgow, the coal mine and coke works at Rix's Creek (near Singleton), the Chesney Mine (south of Cobar, at Wrightville), the Peak Gold mine (south of Wrightville), and the Conqueror Gold Mine (a small mine, due east of the Peak and south-east from Cobar), but not the Nymagee Copper Mine, which later would be bought by different English investors.

Preparing to float the new company, Great Cobar Limited, its promoters issued a prospectus document forecasting profitable operations. The prospectus also revealed a lucrative result for the promoters. The promoters, referred to as 'the vendors', sold the assets into the float of Great Cobar, at a valuation of £1,150,000. This sum included a payment of £850,000 to Woolner, in cash—including a £50,000 underwriting fee for Woolner—with the remainder, £300,000, in the form of a mixture of fully paid shares or debentures. The outcome was a paper profit of £250,000 for the company's promoters in just six days. A sum of $150,000 was set aside for working capital.

Even at the time of the new company's flotation, the large cash payments to the Great Cobar Mining Syndicate raised concerns. The no-risk profit made by the new company's promoters, at the time of the float, was also of concern. A report of the time stated that, "Private cables have reported that the underwriters were not relieved of a very large portion of the shares and debentures underwritten."

In the early days of the company, such an effective dilution of value seemed of little concern to its shareholders; the share price soon reached £11, and Great Cobar's market value was over £2,000,000. However, the spike in the share price was a fortunate circumstance for those underwriting the float, who had been left holding a huge number of Great Cobar shares at the £5 face value.

The economics of the mining operation were addressed in reports accompanying the prospectus. An American mining engineer, C.M. Rolker, estimated the cost of production would be £41 8s per ton of refined copper—£13 5s per ton less than the estimated current production costs—with an additional £11 6s 3d per ton of precious metals. At a copper price of £60 per ton, Rolker forecast a profit of 15s 10½d per ton of ore processed. It was forecast that once improvements were made, the Great Cobar could produce 13,000 tons of copper annually. With hindsight, it would be apparent that these forecasts and estimates were excessively optimistic. In the year 1912, Great Cobar's most productive year, the mine would make barely over half of that forecast copper production, and its profit largely was due to high copper prices, around £79 per ton.

That the mine had already been producing for some thirty years, by 1906, should have raised some concerns about its remaining economic life; that was especially so, if production was dramatically increased. A report accompanying the prospectus noted ore reserves of 1,530,506 tons, which would yield a profit of £1,215,002 (at a copper price of £60/ton). More ore would need to be found to justify the high valuation of the mine at the float. Moreover, over its life, the ore grades had declined. As a low-grade mine, it would require enormous amounts of ore to be smelted, necessitating a vast capital investment in equipment.

However, although it was unforeseen at the time, the large issue of debenture debt would come to burden the venture and—despite its becoming profitable in terms of gross profit—would reduce net profits to an extent that precluded payment of dividends to shareholders.

The debentures had first-mortgage security, with 6% per annum interest payable twice yearly on 1 May and 1 November. The debentures were redeemable at 105% of face value, beginning at the end of the 1908 financial year. Redemptions were to be funded by £100,000 drawn from the profits of that year and each subsequent financial year. Implicit in that scheme was that the Company needed to make a net profit of, at very least, £100,000 annually, from 1908, or otherwise it could not redeem debentures at the rate that was planned.

By mid 1908, with the shares trading at £6½, some were drawing attention to the problems of the financial structuring of Great Cobar Limited, particularly the impact of asset dilution and debenture interest payments, and advising investors to sell the stock. During the period from the float to mid 1908, the shares had traded over a wide range, from as high as £12 5s. to as low as £4½, giving rise to suspicions that the Great Cobar Ltd share price had been subject to some market manipulation.

==== Hugh Woolner and his associates ====
Hugh Woolner was the principal of the London stokebroker company Woolner and Company which had "incurred heavy losses through the default of clients, falling markets and the stagnation of business due to the South African war". By the end of 1904, the firm was insolvent but continued to trade illegally. By promoting a company, called Bohemian Mining Corporation Limited, Woolner and Company returned to solvency. Woolner and Co sold into its float Schoenfeld-Schlaggenwald Zinn und Wolfram Zechen Gewerkschaft, a tin and wolfram/tungsten mine near Karlovy Vary. A director of Bohemian Mining Corporation—ultimately an unsuccessful investment for its shareholders—was Andrew Haes, later the Chairman of Great Cobar.

Woolner acted as the buyer when the Great Cobar assets were purchased in May 1906, before selling them into the float of Great Cobar Limited six days later. The deal was complex but ended up being unprofitable for Wollner, personally. It came to light that Woolner was the nominal buyer, merely acting for others, particularly George Earle Baker, one of the vendors, who had been a mining agent in Western Australia, and Andrew Haes. Haes, later the chairman of Great Cobar Limited, had advanced the costs for arranging the float to the apparently cash strapped Woolner. Andrew Haes, it was later revealed, had been a director of some failed or unprofitable listed companies.

The public flotation of shares in Great Cobar Limited, in May 1906, was not a success, leaving the promoters with many unsold shares. The promoters set about trying to unload the remaining shares; Woolner went to America and Baker to continental Europe, mainly operating from Amsterdam, trying to sell shares there.

It was a later involvement in the trading of Great Cobar shares that ultimately would be Woolner's undoing as a stockbroker. In April 1907, he accepted orders from a 'Mr Nassif', ostensibly a principal of the New York firm Montmorency & Co., to purchase two parcels of Great Cobar shares, totalling 110,000 shares. 'Mr Nassif' never paid for the shares, and during several months while awaiting payment, the price of Great Cobar shares fell. Woolner and Co. went broke as a result of the uncompleted transaction. Some suspected that the whole exercise had been a 'ramping' attempt to raise the price of Great Cobar shares, which had gone awry when the price actually fell instead of rising.

In 1908, Woolner took legal action and won a case against George Earle Baker—another promoter of Great Cobar Limited—and obtained a judgement for £7,000. However, the judgement was reversed and made against Woolner & Co., for £11,702. Woolner and his partner Sumner-Jones were declared in default and ‘hammered’, meaning they could no longer trade on the London Stock Exchange. Bankrupt and publicly humiliated, Woolner attempted to re-establish his career in America, spending some of his time there. His personal bankruptcy was discharged in 1910.

The judgement against Woolner had been a pyrrhic victory for George Earle Baker. The £18,598 in assets he recovered from Woolner's bankrupt estate were later sold for only £200; that, along with a large loss on his own shareholding in Great Cobar, led to Baker's bankruptcy. He would still be an undischarged bankrupt in March 1920.

==== John Kendall and his associates ====
John Dixon Kendall (1848–1928) was a British consultant mining engineer. He was a Fellow of the Geological Society of London and Member of the North of England Institute of Mining and Mechanical Engineers.

He had managed iron ore mines in the North of England, while residing at Whitehaven. One report, in 1884, referred to him as "probably the greatest authority upon haematite iron-ore mining and geological conditions of haematite". He resigned, as manager of Postlethwaite's Moor Row Mine, and set up a consulting practice in London, in 1896.

His first involvement with Great Cobar was in 1903, when he provided a report on its operations for its then owners, the Great Cobar Mining Syndicate. During the course of that work, he almost certainly met George Blakemore.

It was his firm of consulting engineers, Kendall and Barnett, who reported favourably on the mine for Great Cobar Limited's prospectus, in 1906. Kendall and Barnett received a very large payment of £5,000 and 1,700 fully-paid shares (worth £8,500 at the time of the float).

Kendall played an important role during the early years of Great Cobar's ownership of the mine. He became the company's managing director and consulting engineer, retaining both roles, until June 1909, when he ceased to be connected with the company. The other principal of Kendall and Barnett, W. J. Barnett, was a director of Great Cobar Limited, right to its end.

==== North Cobar mine ====
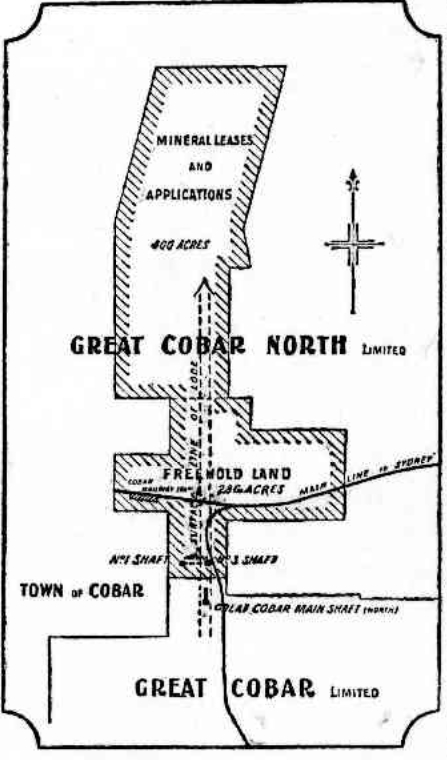
Great Cobar North map.

On a somewhat similar trajectory to becoming controlled by English capital was an adjacent mine site, to Great Cobar's immediate north, the North Cobar mine. First operated by the North Cobar Copper Mining Company Limited—a company founded in 1873, and associated with Joseph Becker and Russell Barton— that company had prospected on its land, without any real success. The mining rights and machinery were sold for £12,500, in mid 1905, and the old company was put into voluntary liquidation, in January 1906. The Great Cobar Syndicate, owners of the Great Cobar mine, had not moved to take over its neighbour, and a local report described the North Cobar's prospects as poor.

A new English company, Great Cobar North Copper-mining Company, Limited was floated in mid 1906. The new company provided capital funding, and a mine development program began. In 1911, it was still engaged in prospecting the North Cobar lease. Its main shaft was, by then, 1,500 feet deep. However, the expected continuation of the Great Cobar ore body was believed to lie further down, at 1,700 to 2,000 feet.

In 1913, the company sought to raise more capital, and was working to sink the shaft to 1,700 feet. It seems that the North Cobar mine did not produce a significant amount of ore, but from 1913, it was used to ventilate workings of Great Cobar mine. The mine was still being worked in mid 1916, and there were reportedly plans for a concentrator plant, and to send its concentrate to Port Kembla.

At the beginning of 1922, the company was "cleaning up its assets", reportedly having spent "hundreds of thousands of pounds", but with little to show for it but the deepest shaft on the Cobar field, at over 2,000 feet. The area, where its main shaft once was, is now Cobar Miners' Heritage Park.

=== Location and scale of operations ===
In the late 19th century and the first decade of the 20th century, most non-ferrous metal mines in Australia had local smelters. In New South Wales alone, there were examples of mine site smelters at Burraga, Cadia, Sunny Corner, Cangai, Currawang, Bobadah, Nymagee, Mount Hope, Girilambone, Illewong, Elouera, and Shuttleton. However, some of the larger miners stopped smelting at their mines and established smelting works on or near the coast. Examples were the Broken Hill smelters at Port Pirie, the Electrolytic Smelting and Refining operation at Port Kembla, the short-lived Dapto Smelting Works, and the Cockle Creek Smelter.

At least one observer later saw the decision to smelt at the Great Cobar mine site as a fatal mistake. The trend to off-mine smelting was made more feasible by the use of the froth flotation process, at the mine site; only the concentrate was shipped from the mine site to the smelter, and coke did not need to be shipped to the mine. However, in 1906, pyritic smelting had been achieved, and Delprat's flotation process had only just been applied, and the more successful froth flotation process—the Sulman-Picard-Ballot patent of 1905—was still newly invented; Great Cobar had no operational experience with flotation. Great Cobar Mining Syndicate had smelted profitably at the mine, but Great Cobar Limited would attempt to operate its mine and new smelter on a far greater scale than the previous owners. Essentially, the mine and smelter capacity would be doubled.

Great Cobar Limited also inherited the electrolytic refinery at Lithgow, which refined copper matte and, later, blister copper from the Cobar smelter until 1911.

=== Expansion and mechanisation ===
Having to pay interest on the debentures, at the very least, the new company needed to both increase production and control costs; the path to profitability lay in a large expansion of capacity and intensive mechanisation. The mine and smelter capacity would need to be doubled. However, achieving that target necessitated a massive capital expenditure. Great Cobar was to become a vast industrial undertaking in a remote location.

The general manager of the mine, under Syndicate ownership, George Blakemore, already had ideas about how the mine and smelter should be developed. The company sent its consulting engineer, John Kendall, from England, and he, too, had ideas for the future expansion. Kendall was already familiar with the Great Cobar, having provided a report on its operations, for its former owners, in 1903, and his firm provided a favourable report for the prospectus when Great Cobar Limited was floated.

Kendall confirmed the board's confidence in Blakemore, and he remained the general manager under the new ownership, but Kendall would be responsible for the design of the new plant. With shareholders impatient to receive a return, the two would work together to speedily erect and commission a massive new plant, expected to cost £160,000.

When designing their new plant at Cobar, Kendall and Blakemore based it upon daily smelting rates of 1,500 tons of 3% copper ore—a target difficult for the mining operation to achieve—consuming 130 tons of coke. 900 tons of slag would also be produced, and need to be dumped on the site. Later, due to a lower proportion of 'basic' ore and higher proportion of 'silicaceous' ore, up to 100 tons of limestone would also be needed daily, as a flux, to remove excess silica as calcium silicate in the slag.

The new plant centred around a new main mine shaft, which Blakemore had already begun to have sunk in 1903. The existing Barton's shaft could only raise 600 tons per day, and Becker's shaft somewhat less. The new shaft would raise all the mined ore to meet the new target of 1,500 tons per day. The new main shaft was slightly to the north of the previously northernmost shaft of the old mine, Becker's shaft.

In 1907–1908, a huge new steel-framed building and a new steel headframe, for the new main shaft, were erected. Then there was the rest of the new equipment; two gyratory crushers, three water jacket furnaces and three Bessemer converters, together with two electric locomotives, slag pot wagons, two electric overhead gantry cranes (one 20 ton and one 40 ton), steel plate conveyors, and a massive new powerhouse to supply the site with electricity, compressed air, and the air blast for the furnaces. There was a new system of standard-gauge railways in the plant, with overhead wiring for the electric locomotives.

New smelting plant (1908)

View of Great Cobar works, under construction, in July 1908. The perspective is looking south, from atop the poppet head of the adjacent North Cobar mine. The furnace ore bins are in the foreground on left. In the foreground at right is railway line, with poles for electrical overhead wiring. The smelter, water tanks, and headframe are in the background to the right. (Photo from MHNSW)

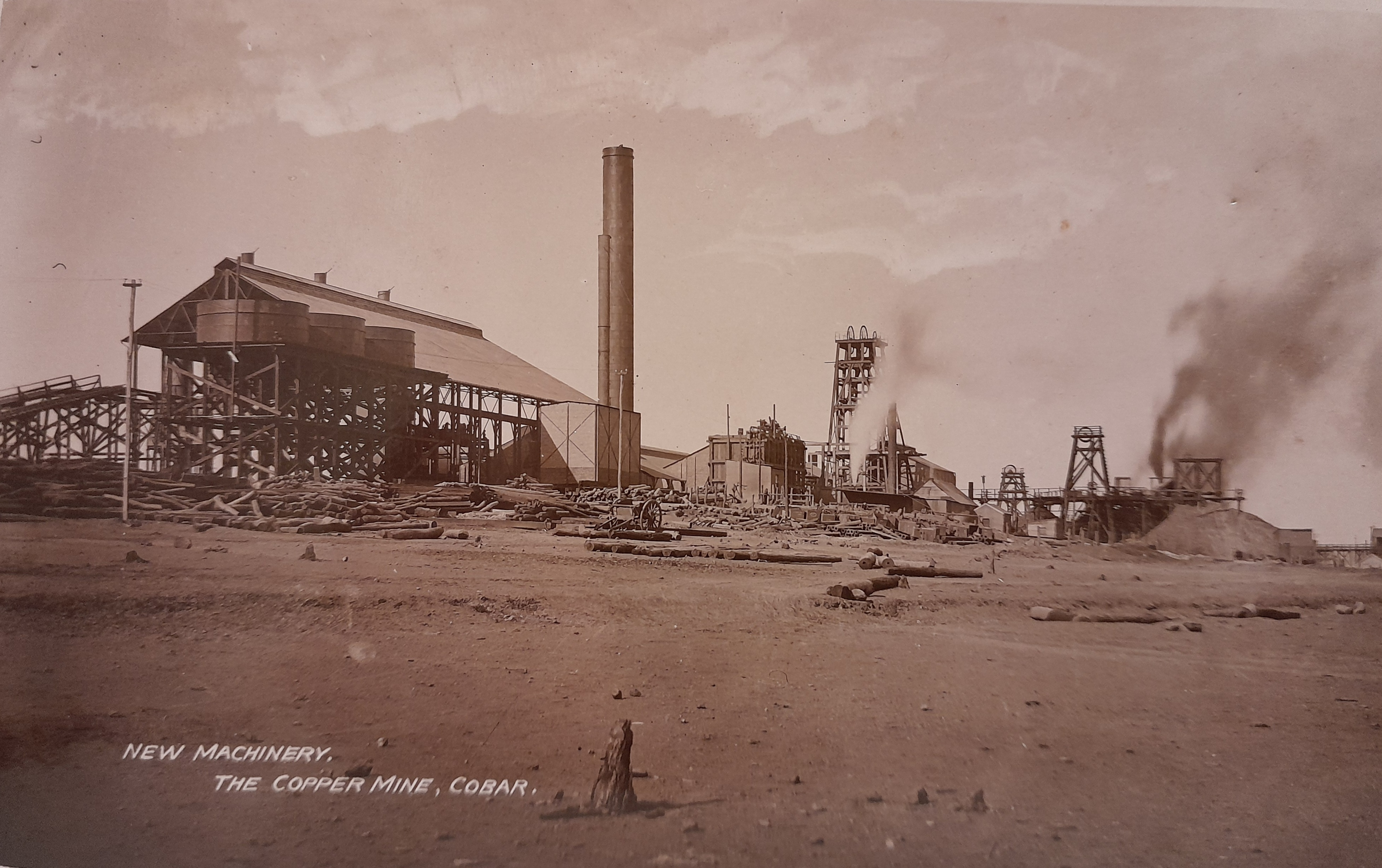
The new smelter under construction. Left to right, new structure for the inclined tramways to the furnace charging floors, new water tanks and structure, new furnaces building, new converters chimney and new furnaces chimney (overlapping), and new main shaft and its headframe. On the right are the headframes of the old Becker and Barton shafts. (c.1908)

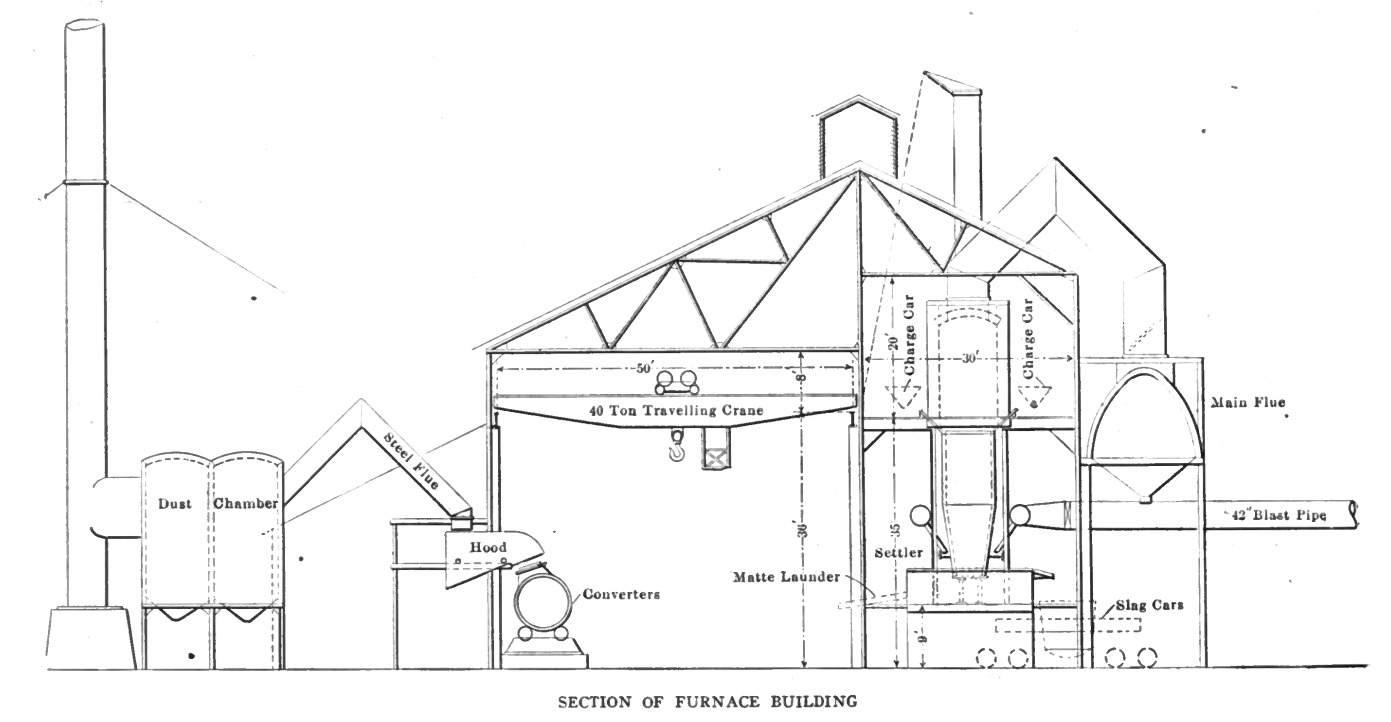
Section of Furnace Building (1908). Converters are on the left (western side), and the water-jacket furnaces are on the right (eastern side). So, the section is viewed looking north, from the southern end of the building.

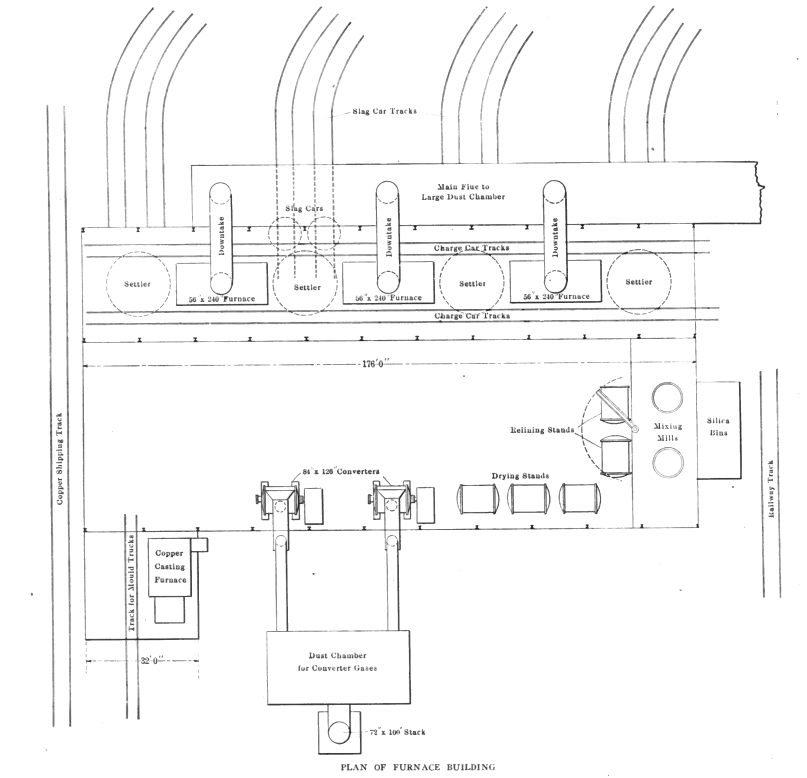
Plan of Furnace Building (1908), showing the original arrangement. A fourth water-jacket furnace and a third converter were added later.

=== Teething problems and management changes ===
When the new plant was completed around September 1908, there were problems bringing it into service, but fortunately, the old Syndicate-era smelters were able to keep working. By January 1909, two of the new furnaces were working but had been damaged; the other one was completely out of service.

Kendall blamed Blakemore for this situation. Blakemore was dismissed and replaced by Herman Bellinger in February 1909. When Blakemore was given a farewell presentation on 23 February 1909, he introduced Bellinger to his guests, including the mine managers of the Chesney and Peak mines and trade union officials. Kendall and Bellinger made a tour of the operations in March 1909.

Blakemore contended that Kendall's design had been faulty, apparently overlooking his own role from 1906 to 1908 and his far more extensive experience in smelting. He remained in the district as a consultant to other ventures. Blakemore would later work for the rival C.S.A. mine, something that would have consequences for the Great Cobar, a decade into the future.

Removing Blakemore did not end the problems. Around midnight on 11 June 1909, Cobar residents were awakened by a series of explosions that caused extensive damage to the No. 2 furnace. Fortunately, the No. 1 furnace was ready to reenter service by then. This was not the first such explosion; an earlier one had been reported in March 1909. It was noted that while Bellinger had reportedly stated that the new plant was "modern and quite satisfactory", he was already making modifications to the plant.

The managing director, John Kendall, like Blakemore, ultimately seems to have been held responsible for the poor performance of the new plant and ceased to be connected with Great Cobar after June 1909. He had resigned as both a director and as consulting engineer by the time of the extraordinary general meeting of the company that was held in July 1910. The new managing director was George Earle Baker, who had been one of the promoters of the float of Great Cobar Limited in 1906.

==== Herman Bellinger ====
Herman Carl Bellinger (1867–1941) was born in Germany. In 1873, he emigrated to Nevada, United States, where his father worked as a mining engineer. From the mid-1880s, Bellinger was working in the copper industry, with Fritz Augustus Heinze. From 1897, he was associated with the Trail Smelter, near the Canada–United States border in British Columbia. In 1906, he was working in Crofton on Vancouver Island, where there was a copper smelter. After the panic of 1907, copper prices fell, and the smelter, owned by the Britannia Mining & Smelting Company, closed in January 1908, likely making Bellinger available to work at the Great Cobar.

Bellinger took over as General Manager in February 1909. He was responsible for expanding the Great Cobar operations to their final extent. He resolved some of the problems facing the mine and smelter. However, by 1913, he had not resolved the labour problems nor the problem that, as mining at Great Cobar went deeper, the ore became increasingly 'siliceous'.

From January 1913 to May 1913, Bellinger was on leave in England and America; during that time, he arranged a new employment agreement with the board. During his visit to England, he reported to an extraordinary meeting of the company, held on 31 March 1913, but his report did not impress observers. His prospects were further damaged by the disappointing company results of July 1913. He resigned in September 1913 but remained as General Manager until new management arrived.

After his time at Cobar, beginning in 1916, he worked for the Chile Exploration Company. He had involvement in mining in Utah, Europe, and Africa. He was awarded the William Lawrence Saunders Gold Medal by the Society of Mining Engineers in 1941 for innovations in mining methods. The translucent blue-green mineral, Bellingerite, Cu_{3}(IO_{3})_{6}·2H_{2}O, is named after him.

=== Changes and extensions ===
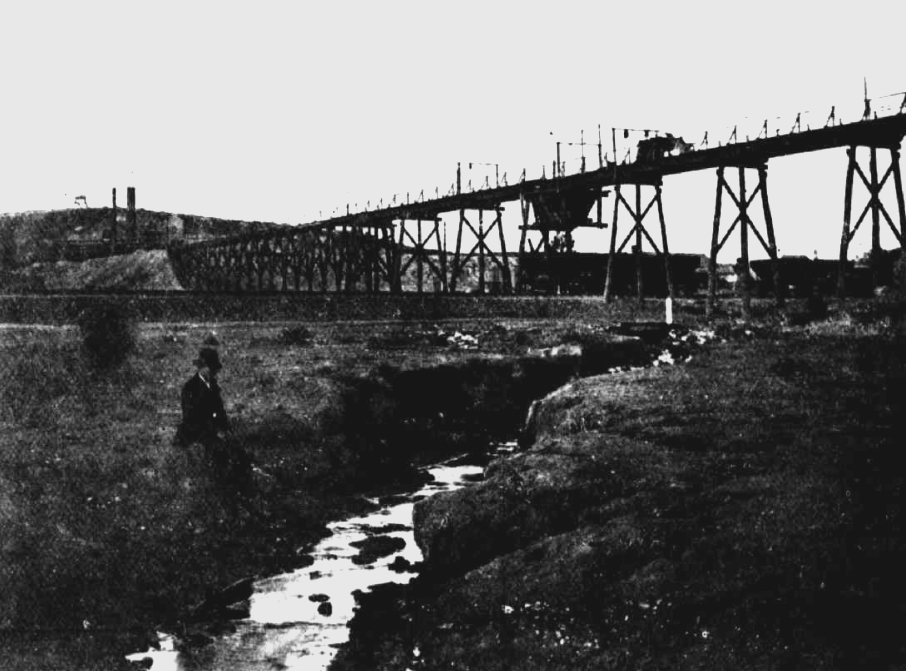
Cobar Gold Mine and its viaduct (1911)

Upon taking over as General Manager at Cobar, Bellinger came to see that indeed there were many faults in the design of the vast but rushed expansion. When there was industrial trouble in late 1909, Bellinger was in no hurry to resolve the strike and used the consequent shutdowns for a major reworking of the still-new plant.

In 1910, the Company bought the Cobar Gold Mine—another of source of 'siliceous' ore that could be used as flux when smelting 'basic' ore— at nearby Dapville. Like the Chesney mine, it lay adjacent to the Peak branch line, allowing its ore to be railed to the Great Cobar smelters.

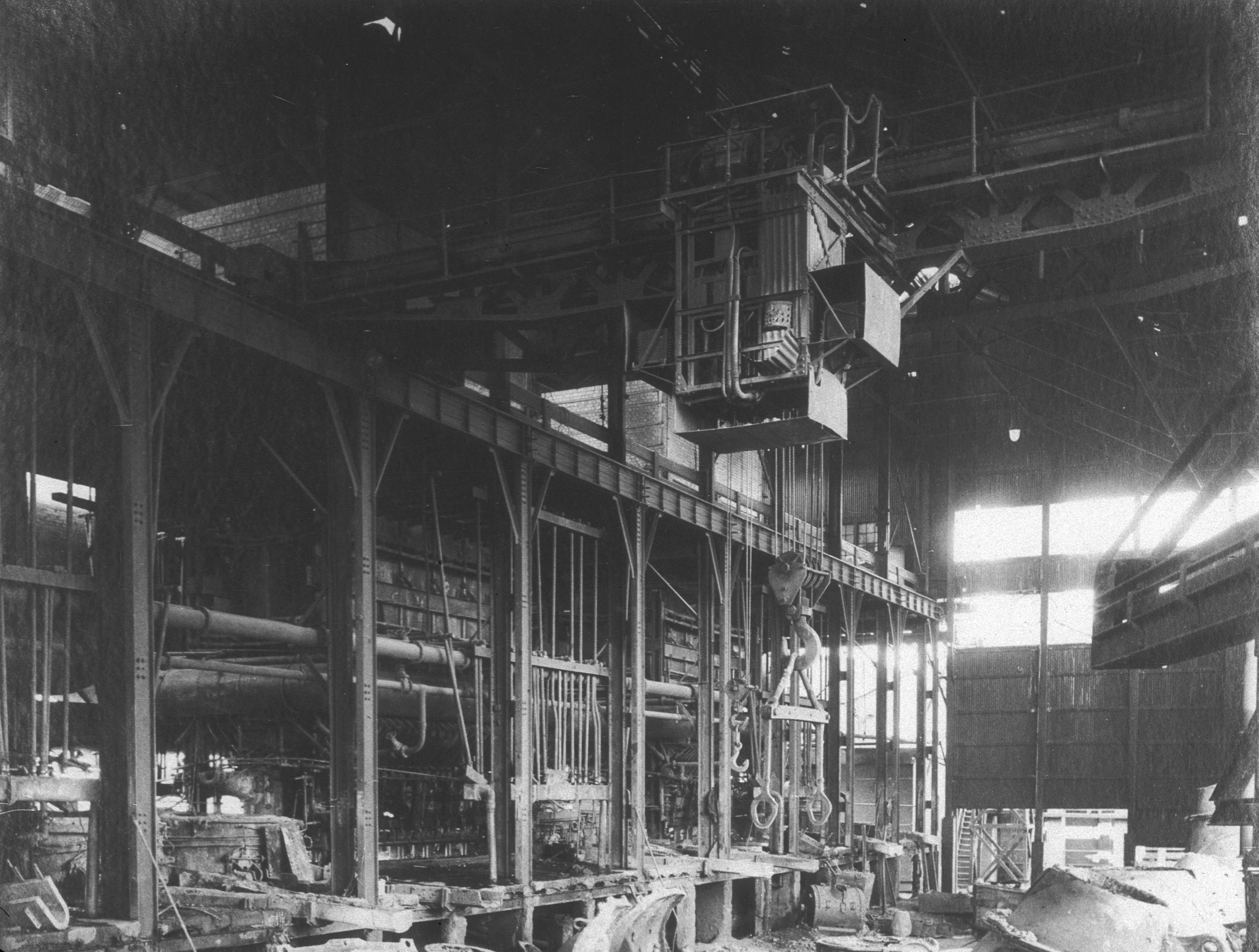
Furnaces and 40 ton overhead crane (1912)

The Great Cobar plant was augmented with new bins, a fourth water jacket furnace, and a third converter, a 40-ton gantry crane, a second motor-generator set, another electric locomotive, and more slag pot wagons, and the three damaged water jacket furnaces were rebuilt. In December 1912, a new flotation process plant entered service, which was intended to recover copper ore from the tailings of the original concentrator plant.

The work was not confined to the Great Cobar site. In September 1912, an elaborate mineral separation plant, using the flotation process, was under construction at the Chesney Mine. Processing the Chesney ore had been one of the problems facing Bellinger, and he believed that the new separation plant would resolve it.

The Great Cobar's electrolytic refinery at Lithgow operated until 1911. It was essentially unaltered from the days of the Great Cobar Mining Syndicate, which had built it. As Great Cobar's production grew, it became too much for the Lithgow plant to process, and Great Cobar exported its crude copper to be refined in America.

By the end of 1912, the Great Cobar plant was finally working properly.

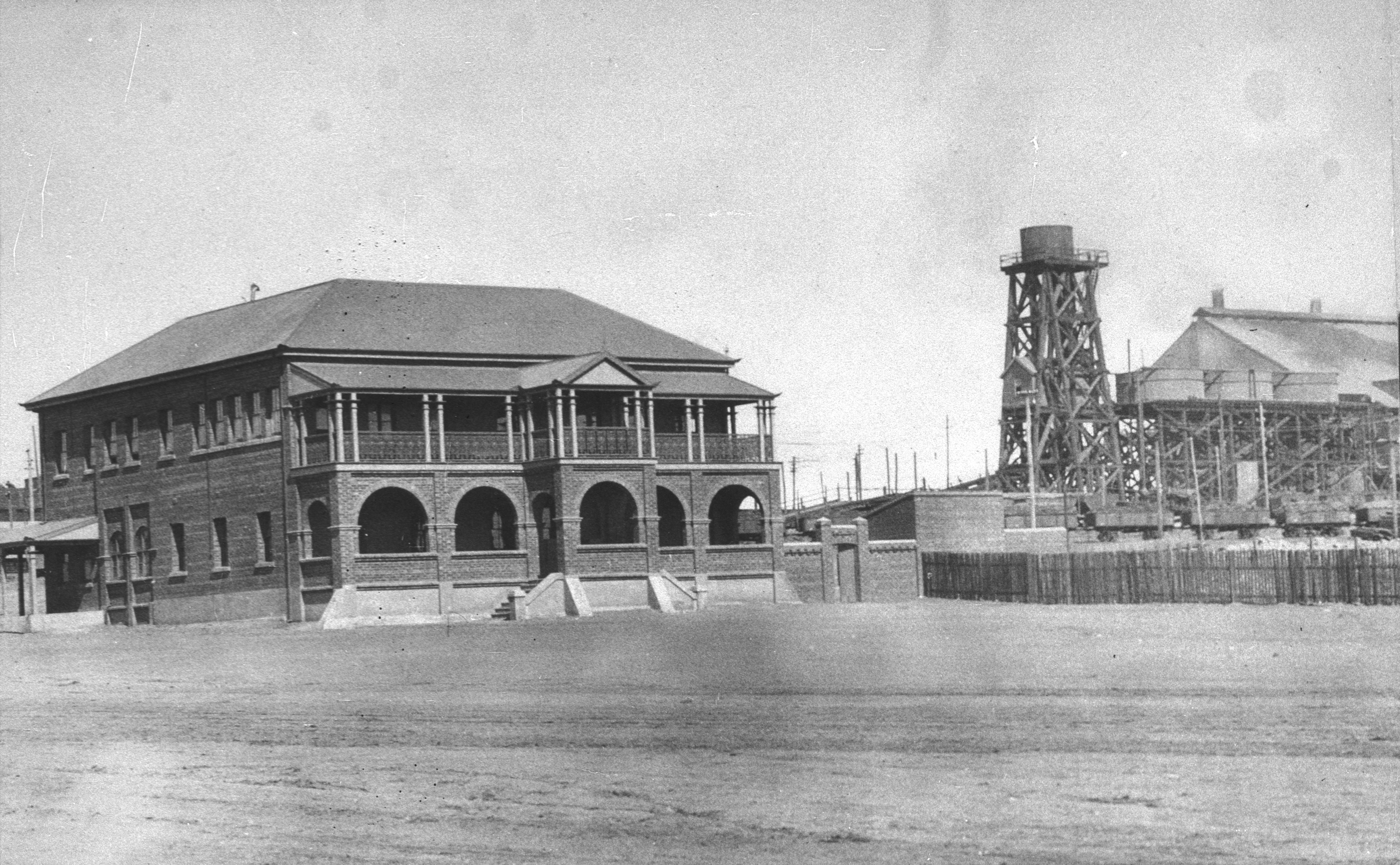
Administrative building.

Also in 1912, as if to demonstrate its confidence in the future for the mine, the company opened its grand new administration building. However, the new plant had cost as much as £500,000, well in excess of the original budget.

In early 1913, with the smelter apparently operating satisfactorily, Bellinger went on leave to America and England. He was away for four months, during which Great Cobar's operations were managed by F. Danvers Power, lecturer in mining at Sydney University. Before he left, Bellinger expressed optimism about the future and stated that Great Cobar would soon achieve annual copper production of 10,000 tons. An unofficial report by an independent mining engineer, C.S. Hertzig, of the firm Messrs. Bewick, Moreing and Co, seems to have confirmed this view, but ominously reported an expected remaining life of the mine of only seven years, at the forecast rate of production.

=== Equipment and operations ===
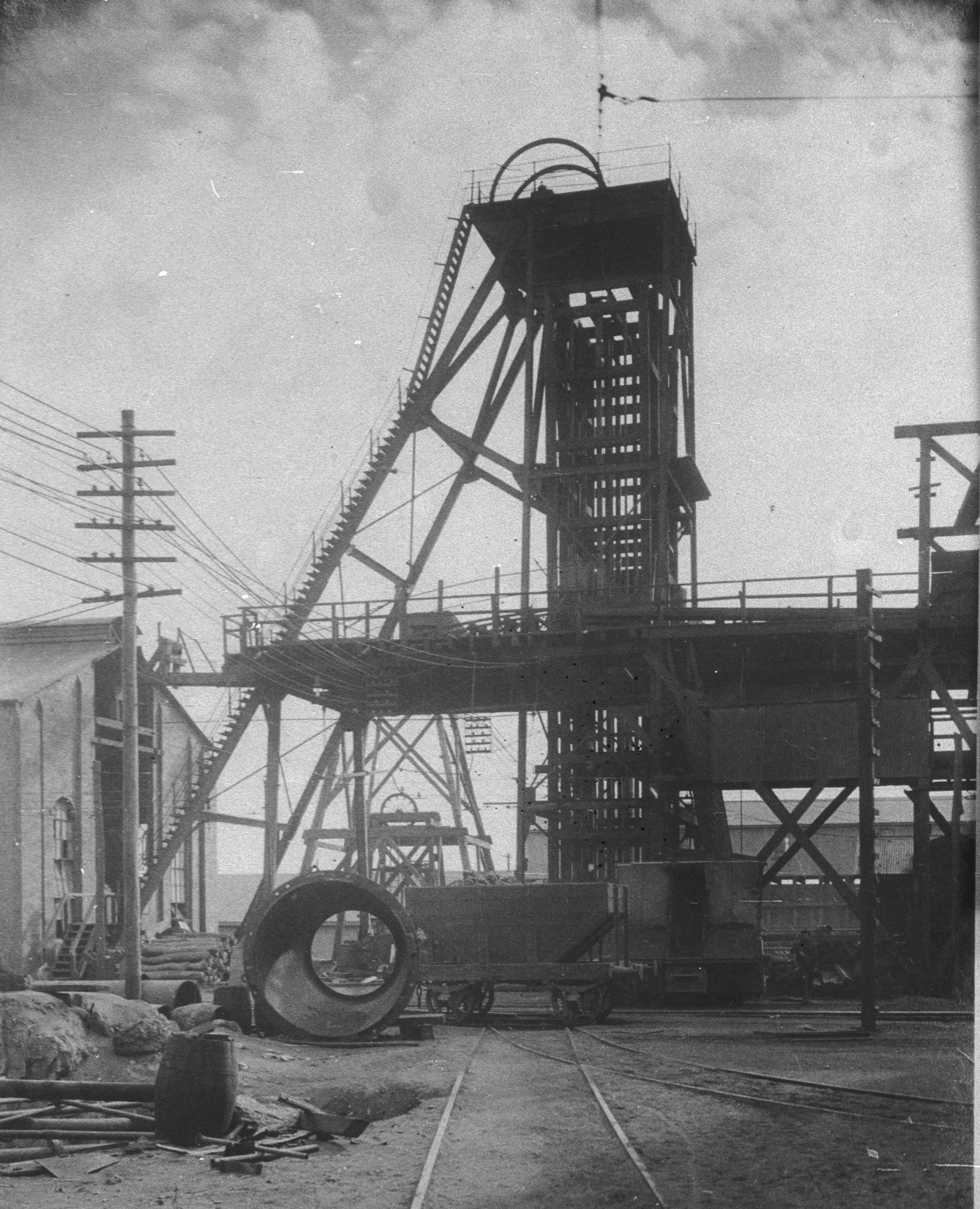
Headworks of the main shaft (1912). It consisted of a steel poppet head structure with platforms and compartment liners made of timber.

==== Main shaft and winder ====
The new main shaft had a rectangular cross-section, 15 feet by 8 feet, divided into three compartments; two carried cages and the other contained pipes, cables and a ladderway. There were levels spaced every 100 feet, from which the mine was worked. In 1910, the main shaft was down to 1,033 feet. In June 1912, the mine was working down to the 13th level, and the main shaft was at 1,419 feet down. By the time the mine first closed in 1914, the main shaft was 1,500 feet deep, providing access to 14 levels.

The winding engine for the main shaft was steam-powered, and made by Andrew Barclay and Sons. It was speed controlled by a high-speed governor, connected to the engine shaft by a chain-drive. There were two winder drums, four feet wide and ten inches in diameter, onto which two layers of the steel rope were wound. The drum being operated was connected to the engine shaft via a steam-operated clutch. Braking was applied by a heavy weight acting on a brake drum, released by a foot control. The brake was applied automatically if the steam supply or the winding engine driver was lost. The levers and controls were arranged so that a single winding engine driver could operate them without leaving his usual position.

==== 'Green ore' bins, crushers, crushed ore conveyor ====
Ore from the mine was first place into 'green ore' bins, then crushed using two 'Heclon' gyratory crushers, made by the Hadfield Steel Company. The crushed ore passed to a steel plate conveyor, where gangue material was manually removed by workers known as 'pickers', and then to the crusher bins. From the crusher bins, the ore was moved by rail to the ore conveyors for the bedding bins.

==== Ore conveyors and bedding bins ====
A contemporary photograph shows that the ore conveyors to the bedding bins were of an advanced design for their day, similar in concept to contemporary conveyor belts. It is not known what belting material was used. They conveyed the ore from railway wagons to one of six bedding bins, each with a capacity of 6,000 tons. These bins were built as part of the 1909–1911 modifications, and allowed ore mined from different stopes to be kept separated and so able to be sent to the smelter in the appropriate proportions.

Ore conveyors and bedding bins

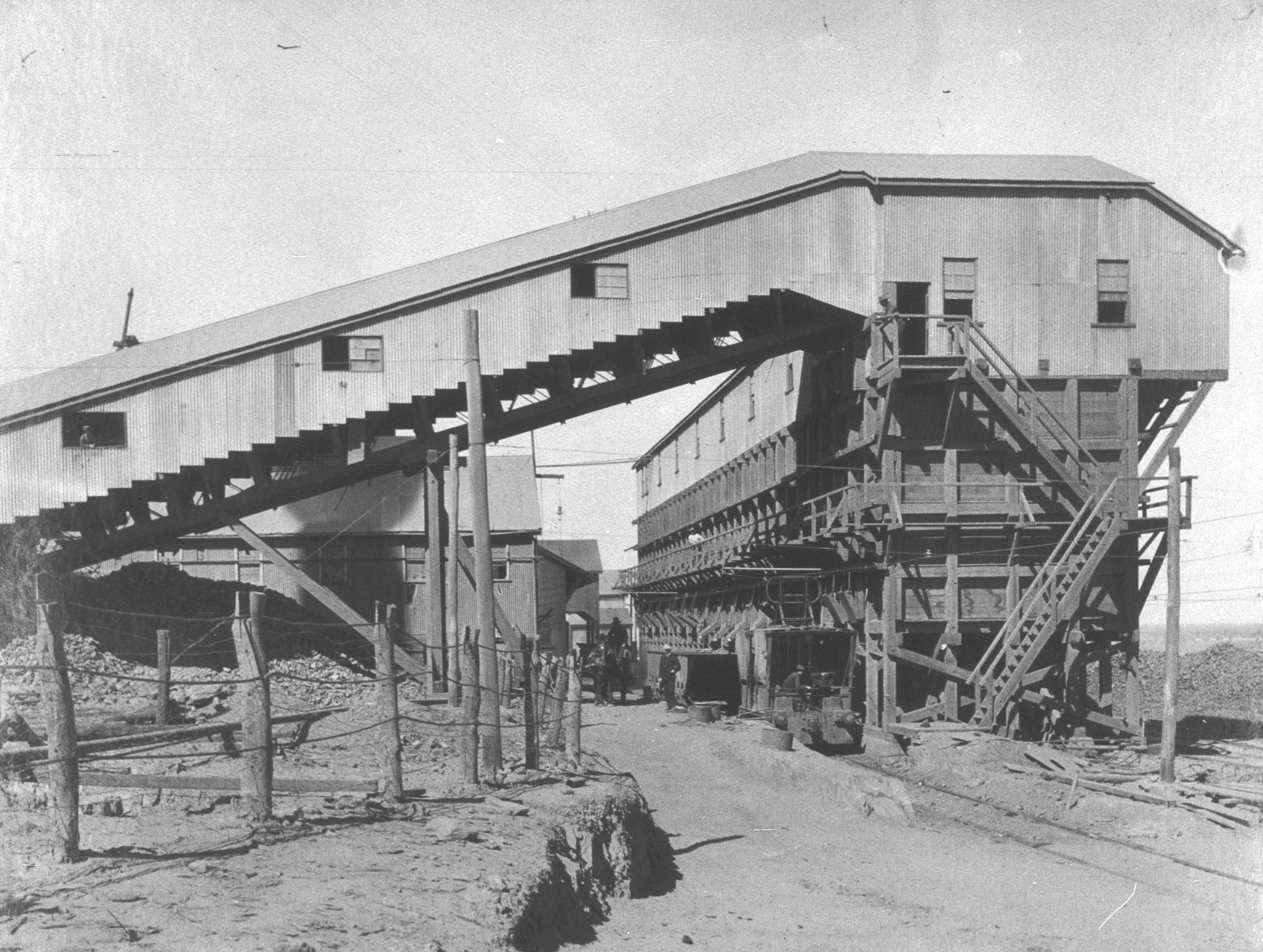
Inclined ore conveyor gantry and bedding bins (1912). Both were added as enhancements to the 1906 design in 1910–1911.

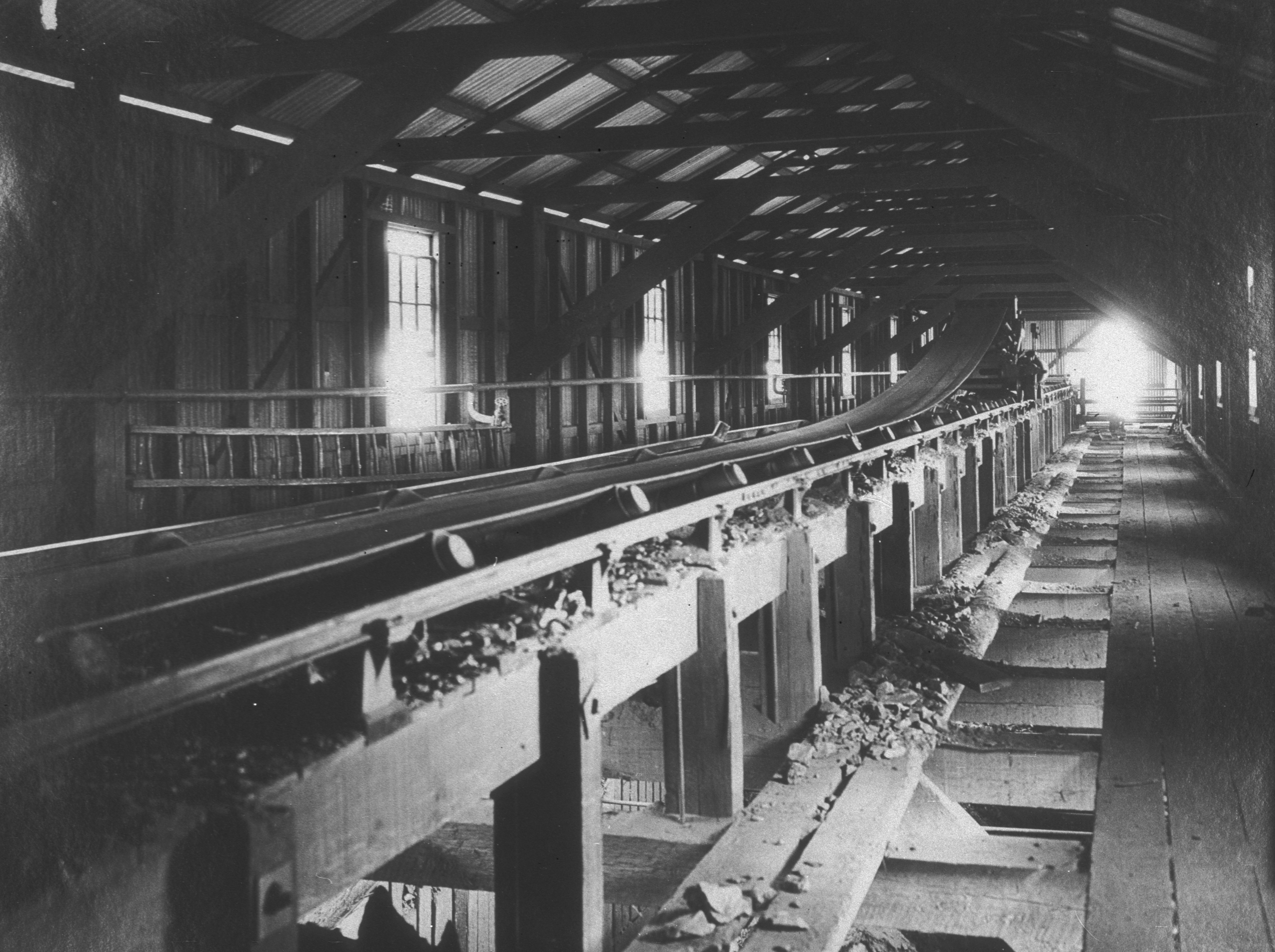
Interior view of the ore conveyor above the six bedding bins. The movable chute on the conveyor is visible at the far end. (1912)

==== Furnace ore feed ====
From chutes below the furnace bins to the feeding floor level of the water-jacket furnaces, side-tip charging skips were hauled by rope over an inclined tramway, onto one of the two charging floors of the furnace building. The skips were then tipped manually, with the ore falling through an openable side hatch directly into the furnace.

Ore feed to furnaces

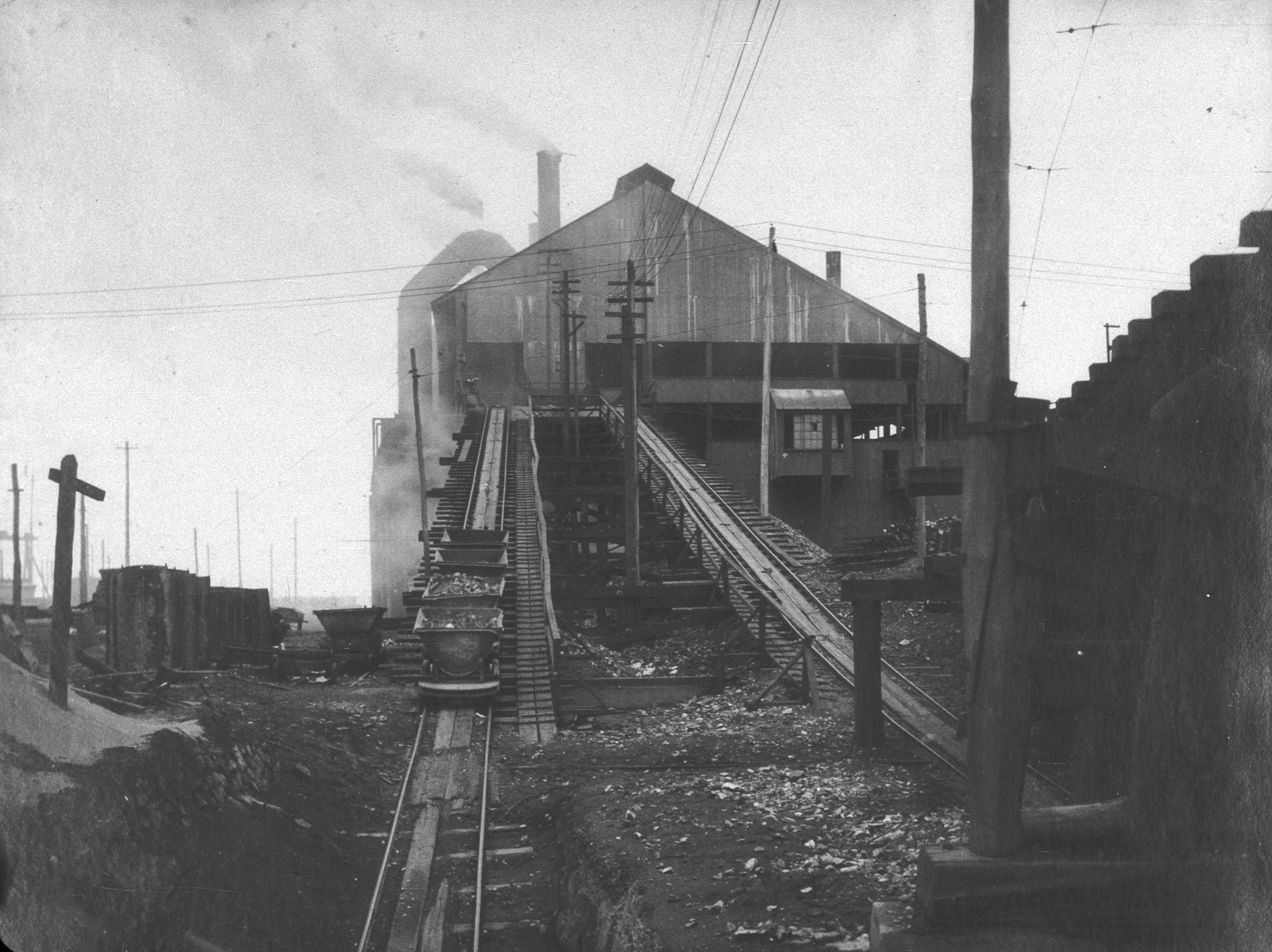
Rope-hauled inclined tramway to furnaces (1912). There were two such inclines, with a charging floor on both sides of the furnaces.

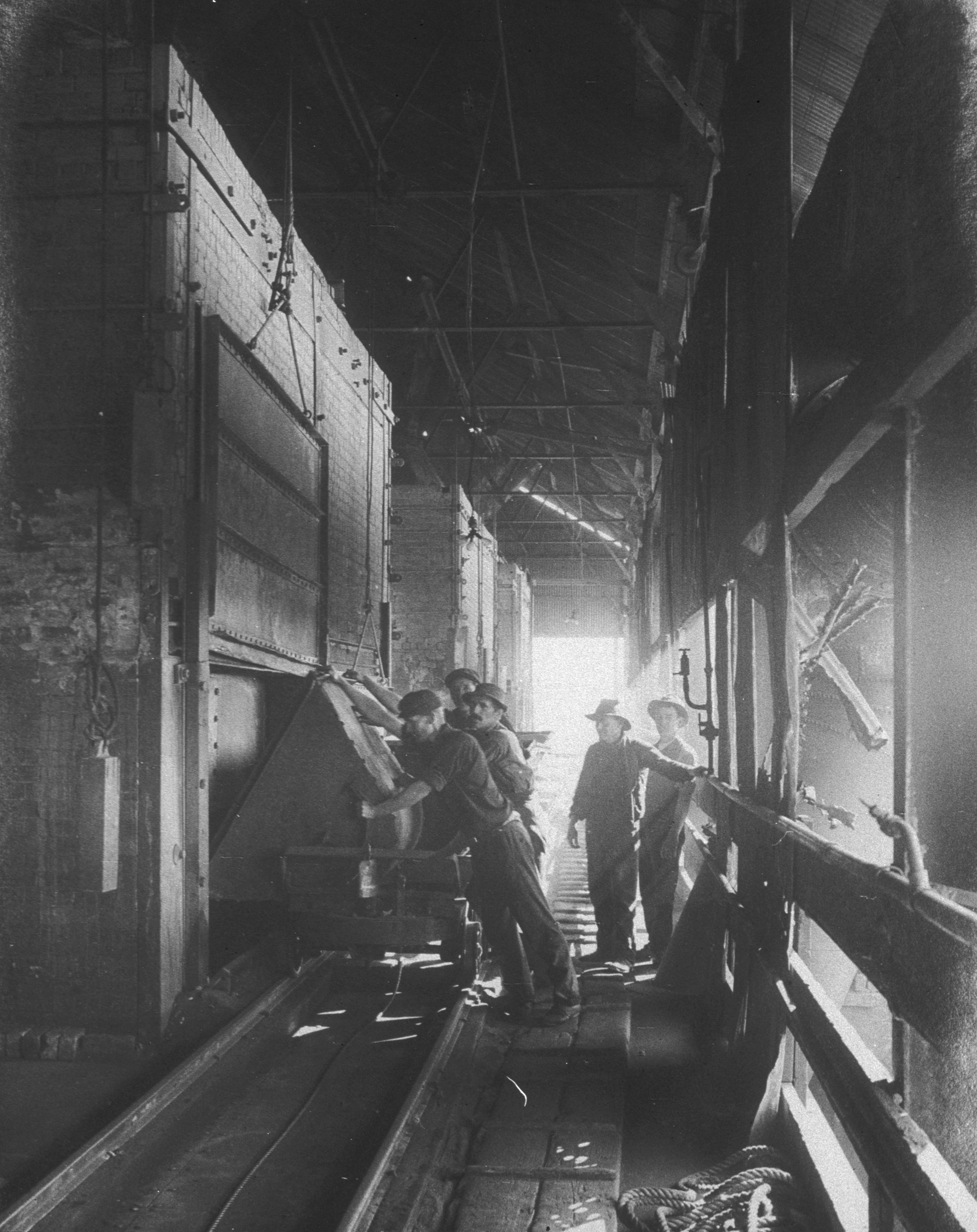
Charging floor at furnaces, with a side-tip charging skip being tipped (1912)

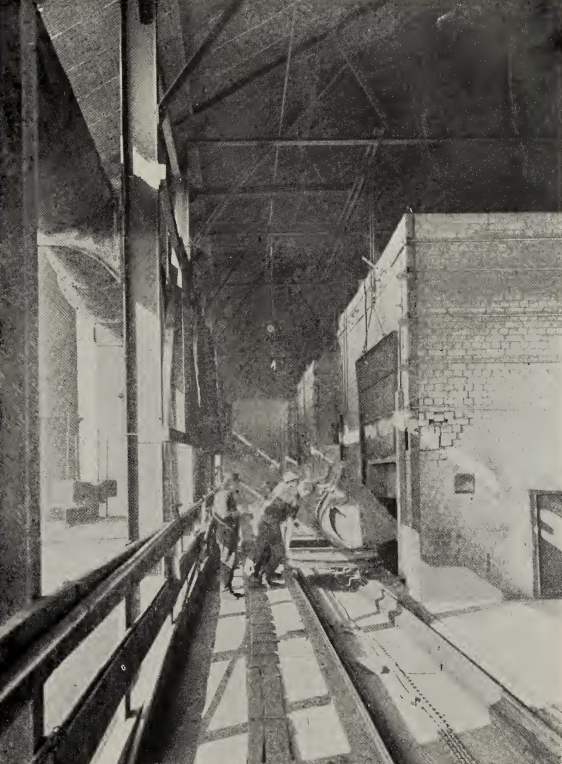
Another view of a charging floor and a charging skip being tipped. Note rope haulage (c.1911).

==== Smelting plant ====
The steel smelter building was 250 feet long and 85 feet high. It contained the four water jacket furnaces, a type of blast furnace specifically designed for smelting non-ferrous metals. These furnaces used 'cold blast'; that is, the air blast was not heated before being injected into the furnace. The furnaces produced copper matte and slag as a waste product. The slag, largely formed of silica, contained iron compounds and other impurities that were separated from the copper ore during smelting.

The furnaces were located along the eastern side of the smelter building. The tap holes for slag were oriented to the outside of the building, where specially designed rail wagons were filled with slag destined for the slag dump. The tap holes for the copper matte were inside the building, where the molten matte was first run into a vessel known as a 'settler' and then tapped into ladles. There were tap holes at both ends of each furnace, and settlers were arranged so that either furnace could use intermediate settlers. Electrically powered overhead travelling gantry cranes carried the ladles of molten copper matte to the converters, in which the matte was converted to blister copper. The converters were located along the western side of the smelter building. There were originally two convertors, but by 1913 there were three. Also on the western side was one much smaller water-jacket furnace, mainly used for remelting copper.

Smelting at Great Cobar - Water jacket furnaces

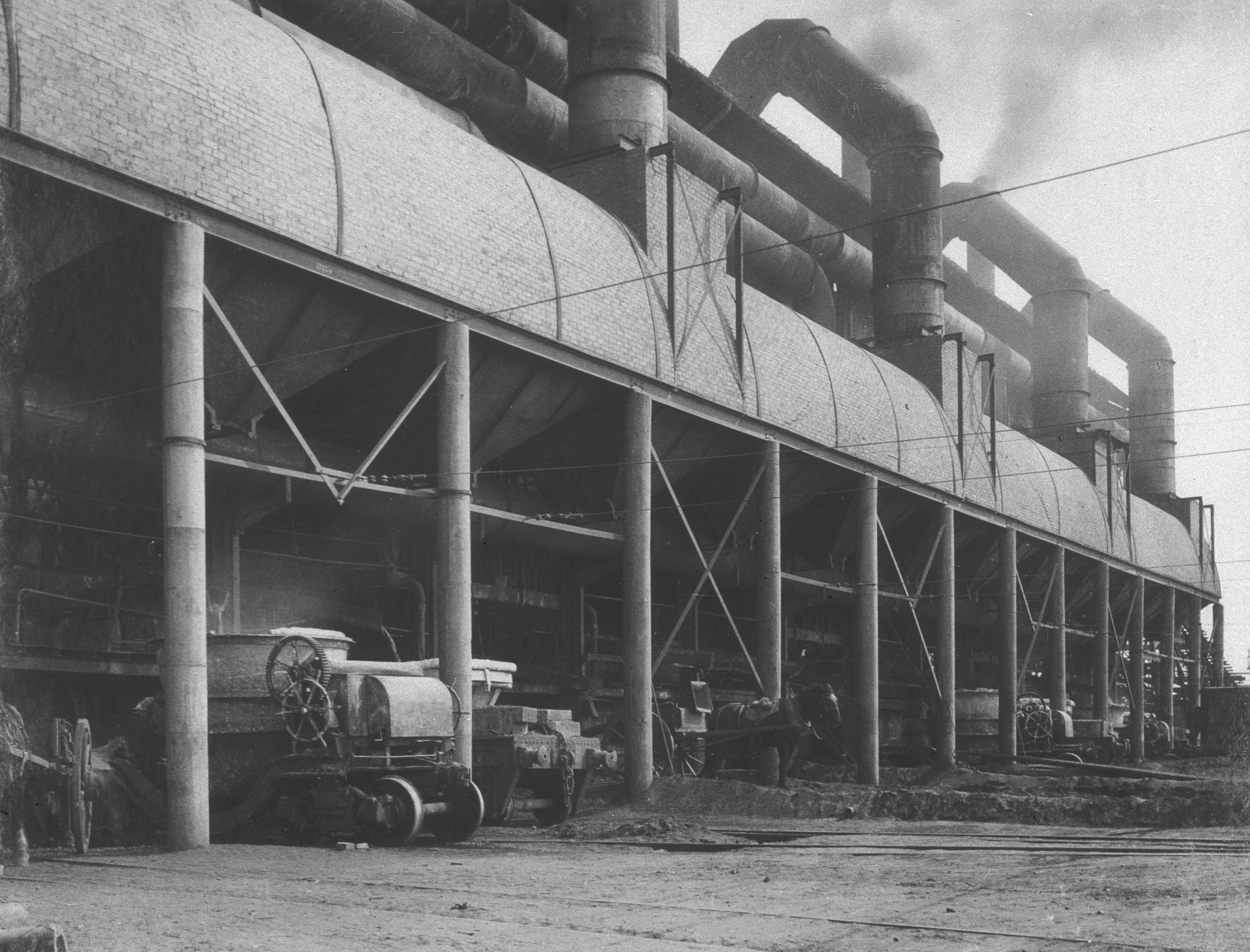
Water jacket furnaces, furnace flues and slag wagons (1912). One of the spouts for molten slag is visible to the right of the leftmost column. There is a horse and cart to the right of the third column.

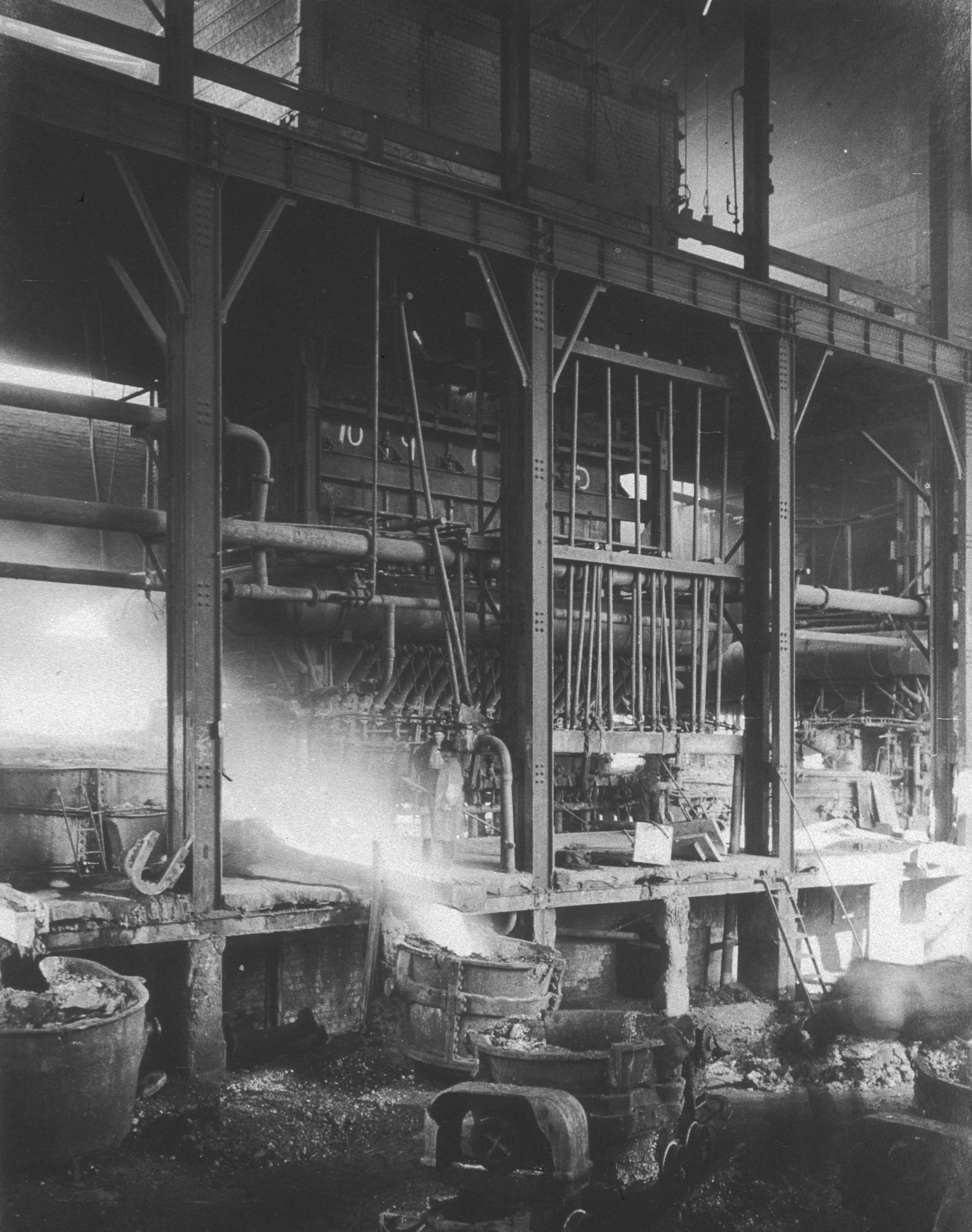
Pouring molten copper matte from a water jacket furnace, June 1912.

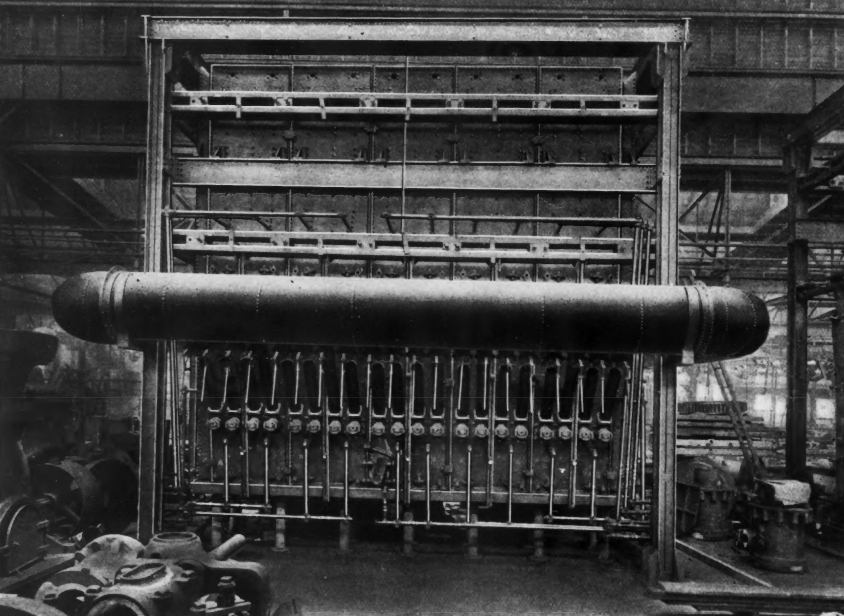
Side view of lower part of water jacket furnace (in manufacturing facility, before installation) c.1908

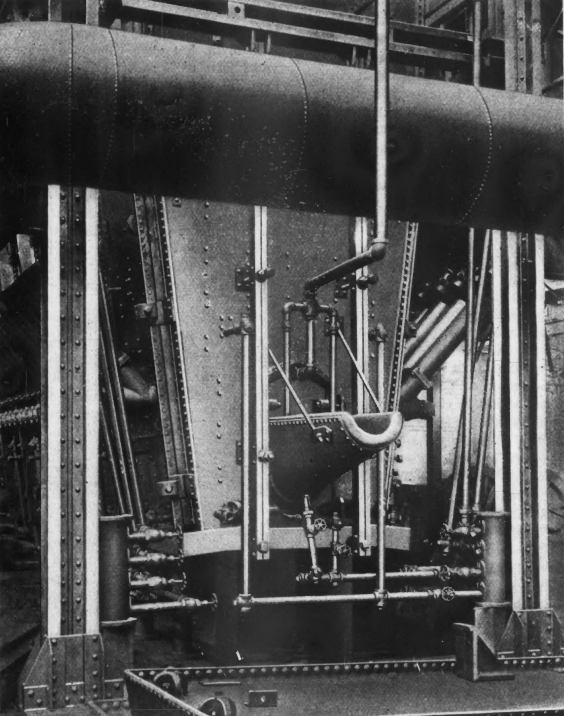
End view of water jacket furnace. Molten copper matte flowed through the spout shown, into a settler, and then into a ladle to be carried to the converter by a gantry crane. c.1908
Smelting at Great Cobar - Converters

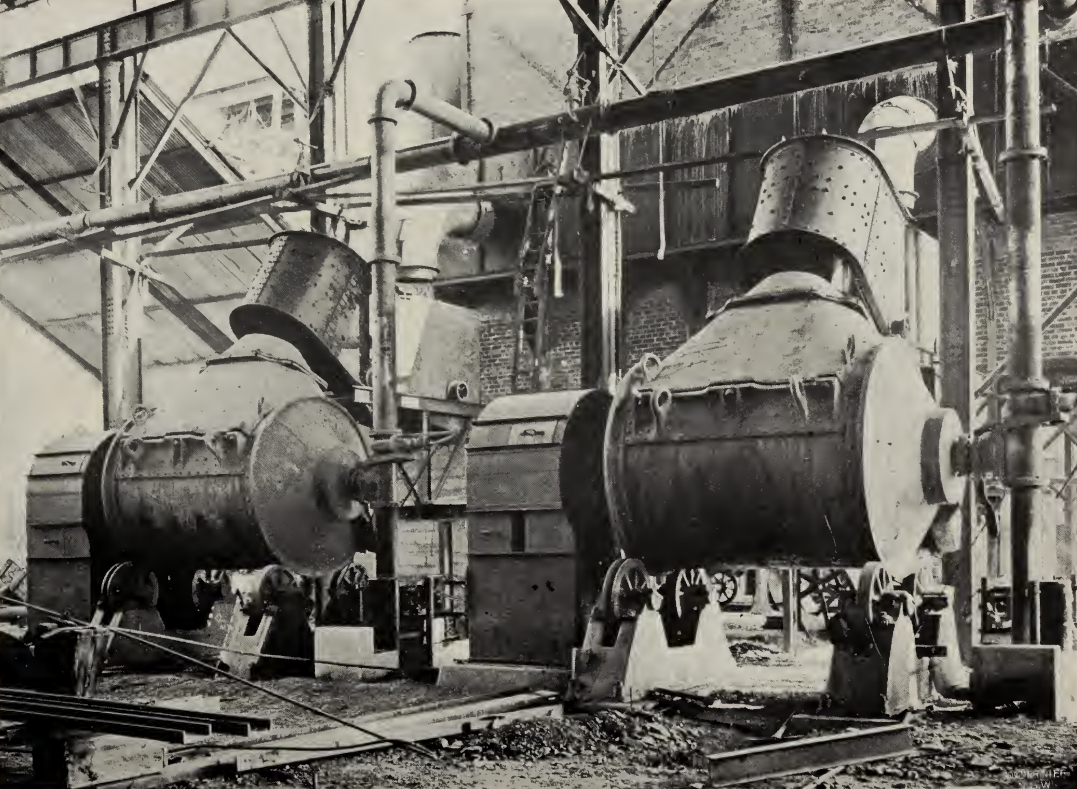
No.1 & No.2 Converters and fume hoods (c.1911), showing the original arrangement with two converters.

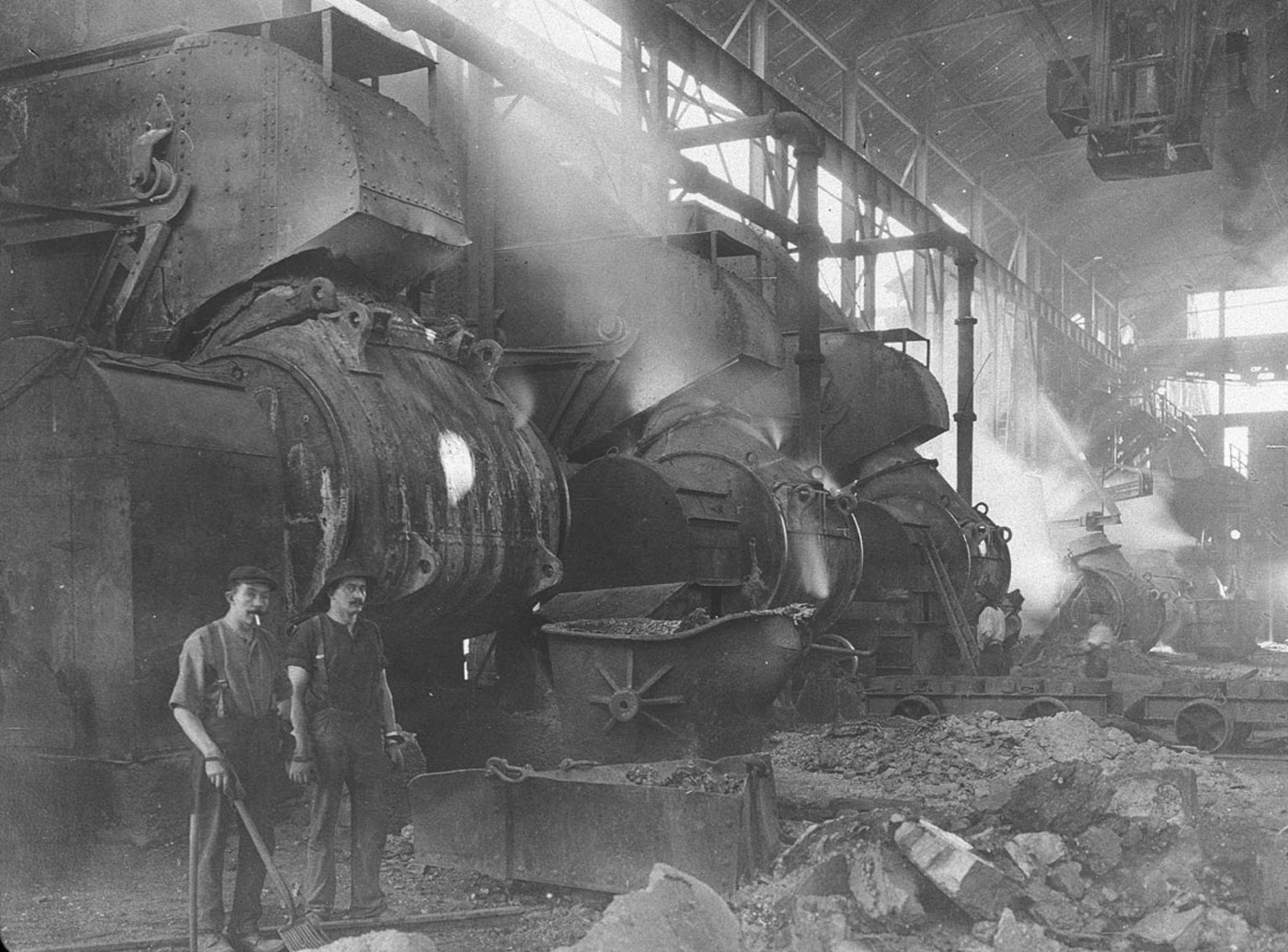
Converters in operation, 1913, showing the final arrangement with three converters. In the background is the area where newly-relined vessels were dried. The control cabin and hook of a travelling gantry crane are at the top right.

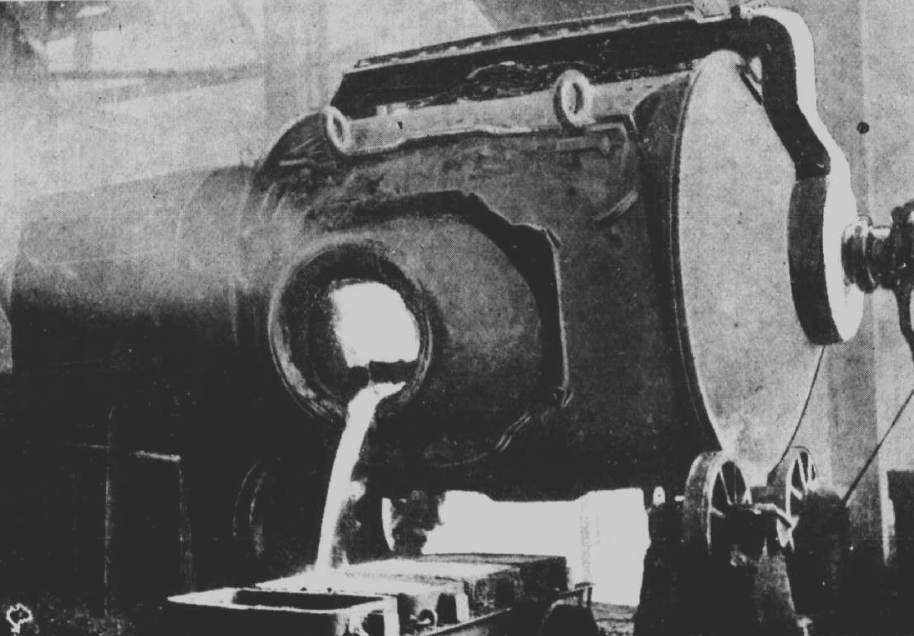
Converter discharging blister copper into ingot moulds, 1911.

Dust in the off-gases from the water-jacketed furnaces and converters had significant metallic content, and it was recovered and returned to the furnaces.

Visible for miles around Cobar, the furnace's chimney was the highest on the site, at 210 feet high. It was 36 feet square at its base and 14 feet in diameter at its top. It contained 375,000 bricks made in Sydney, surrounded by 200 tons of steel plates, secured with a million rivets. It was supplied and erected by Walkers Limited of Maryborough, Queensland. When the chimney was completed, on 24 May 1908, Empire Day, guests were hoisted to the top in an improvised cage, from where the Queen Bee Mine at Illewong, some 12 miles away, could be seen easily.

There was a separate, smaller chimney for the converters. The huge chimneys were to ensure that the noxious gases from smelting and conversion, largely sulphur dioxide, were carried far from the mine and the nearby township.

Smelting at Great Cobar - Chimneys

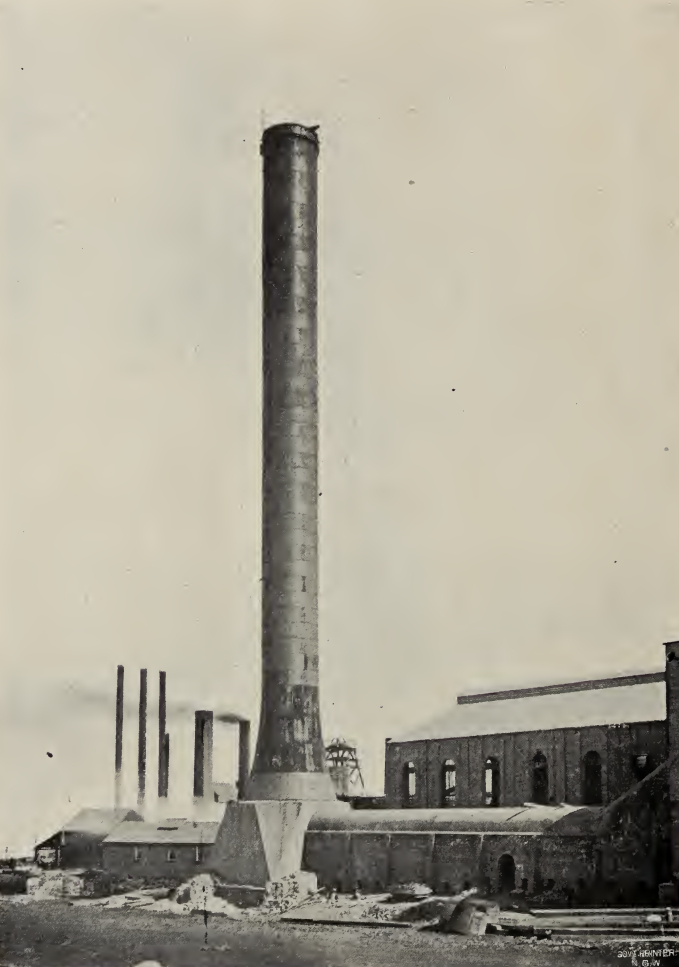
Furnaces chimney stack (1911)

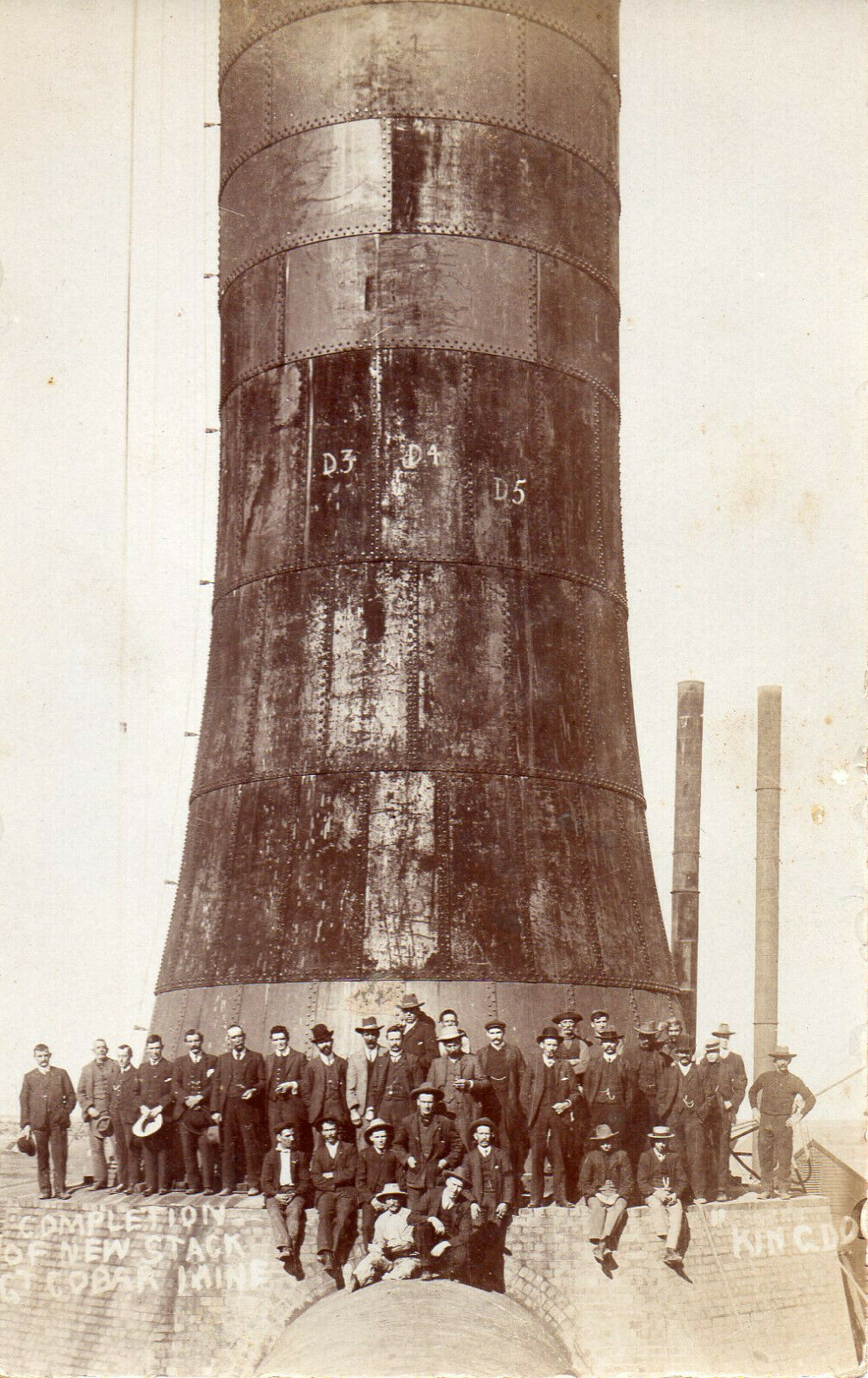
Lower part of the furnaces chimney stack at the time of its completion. Note the steel plate casing and rivets. (1908)

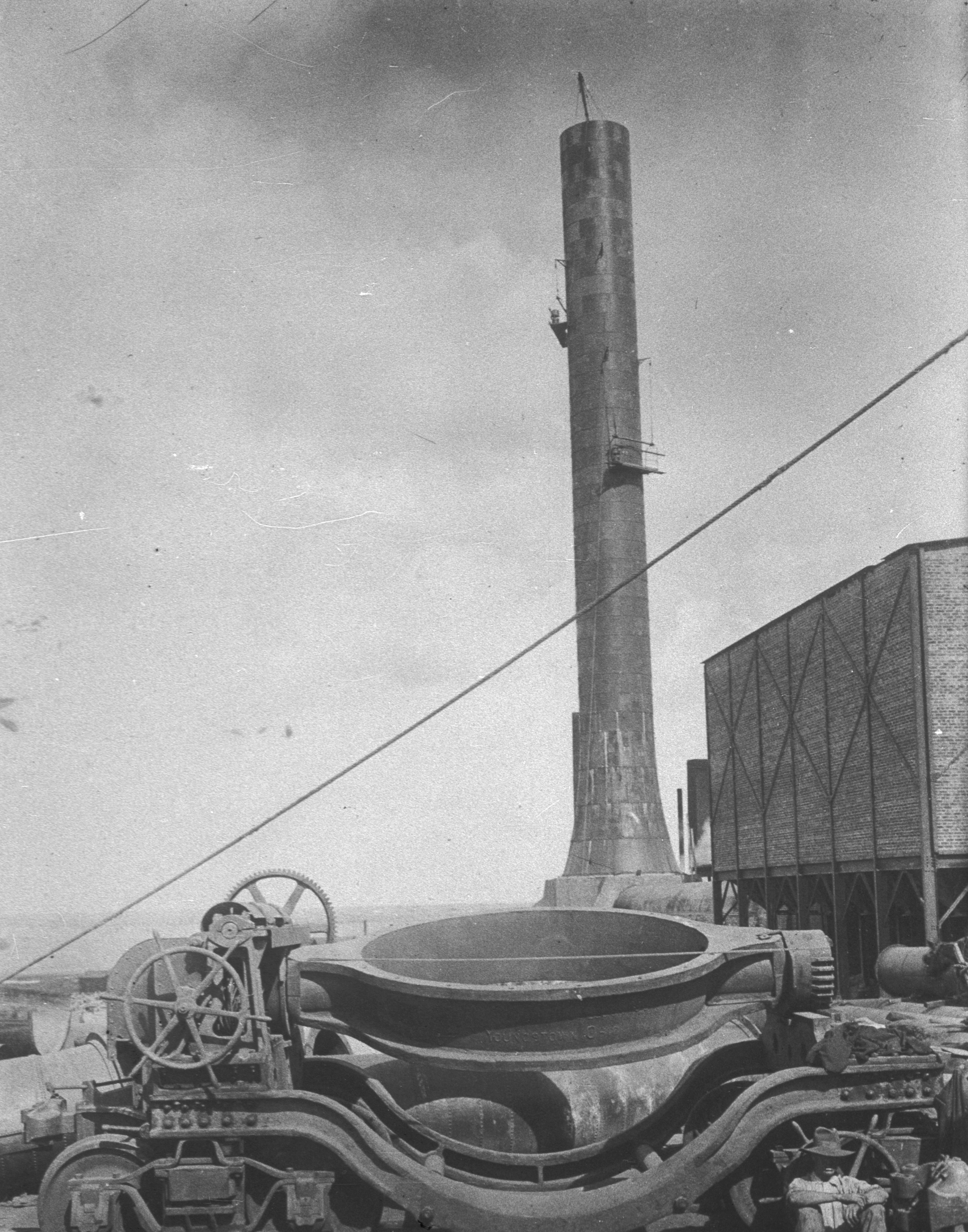
Another view if the chimney, with a partially disassembled ladle car in foreground (1912)

==== Surface rail transport ====
The Copper Mine Branch line—branching from the Cobar railway line—allowed government railways to bring coke and coal to the plant and to carry away the blister copper that the plant produced. It was connected to a standard-gauge rail system inside the plant.

There were about 3.5 miles of electrified standard-gauge railway inside the plant. The electrified railway had two major functions: moving ore from the crusher bins to the bedding bins for the furnaces and moving molten slag and concentrator tailings to the slag dump; it also moved government wagons inside the mining lease boundaries.

Electric power was supplied at 250 Volts d.c. using overhead wiring, which began near what is now Conduit Street, Cobar, the northern end of the Heritage Park. Locomotives, called 'motors', used either a type of semi-rigid bow collector or a pantograph (both can be seen in photographs of the time), to obtain power from the overhead line. The first two 'motors' were supplied by British Westinghouse, and a third was added later.

Electrified railway

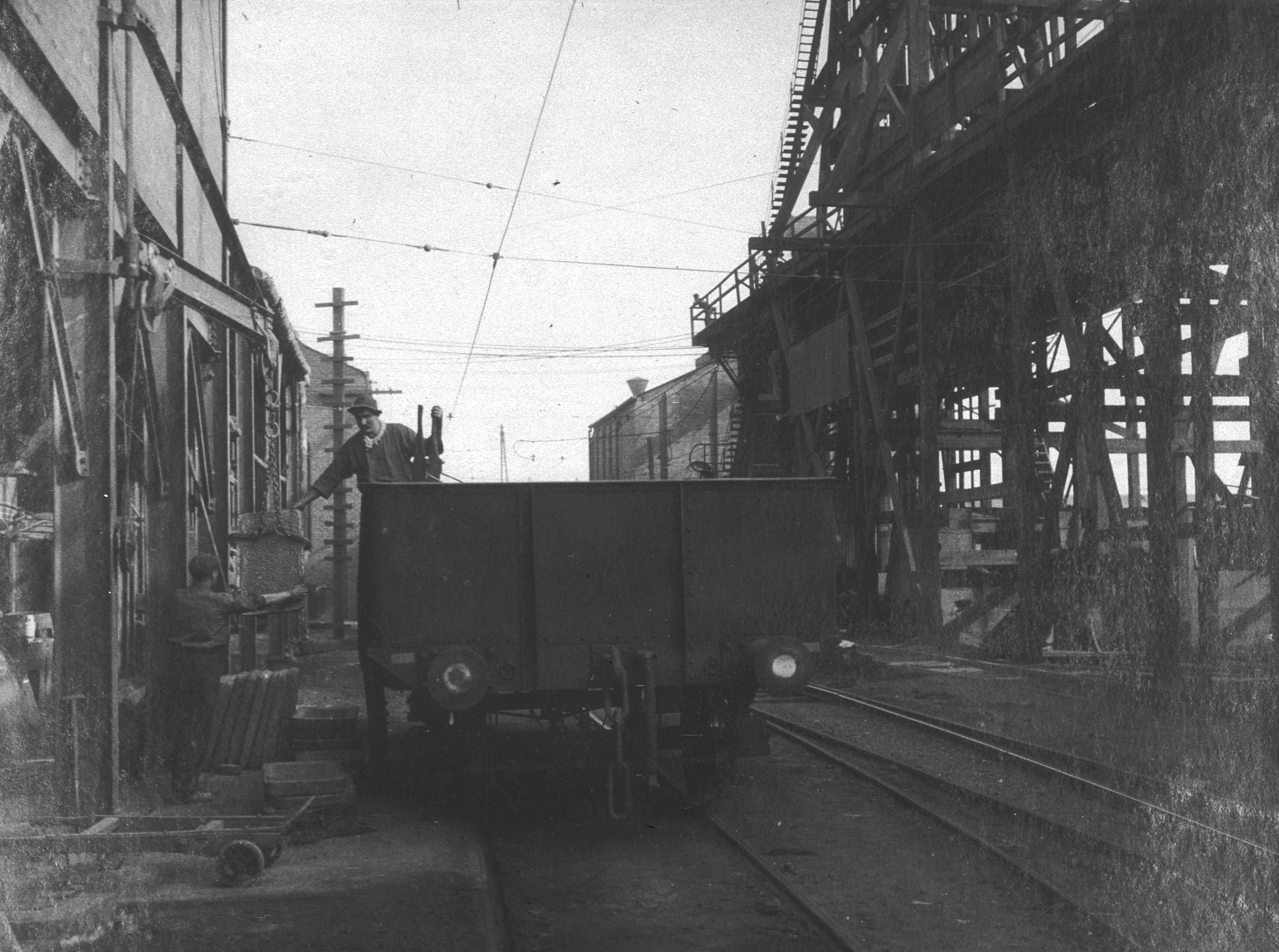
Loading copper ingots into a NSWGR wagon. Note overhead wiring for electrified railway (1912)

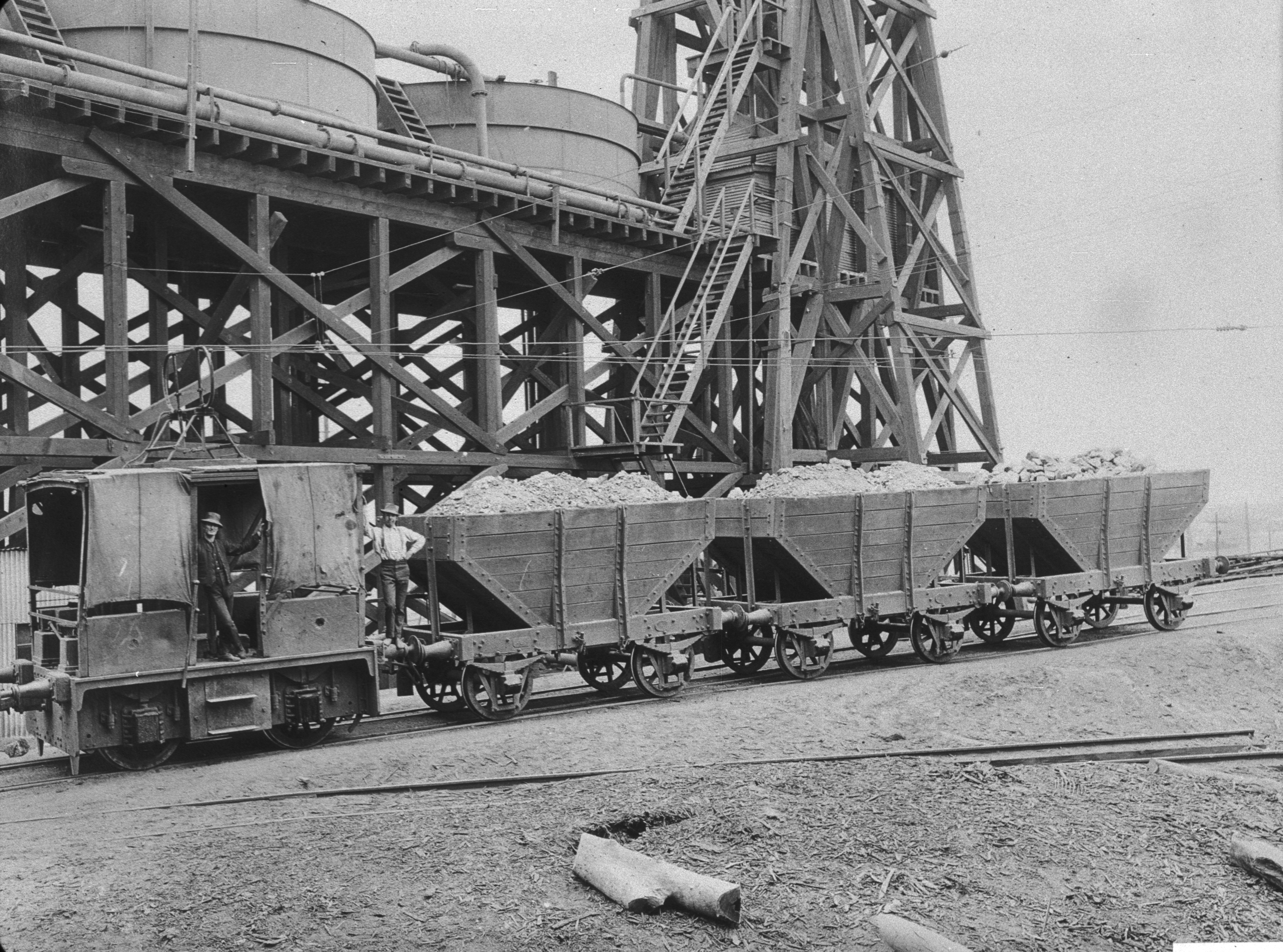
Electric 'motor', with bow collector, hauling ore wagons, with the water tower and tanks in the background (c.1913)

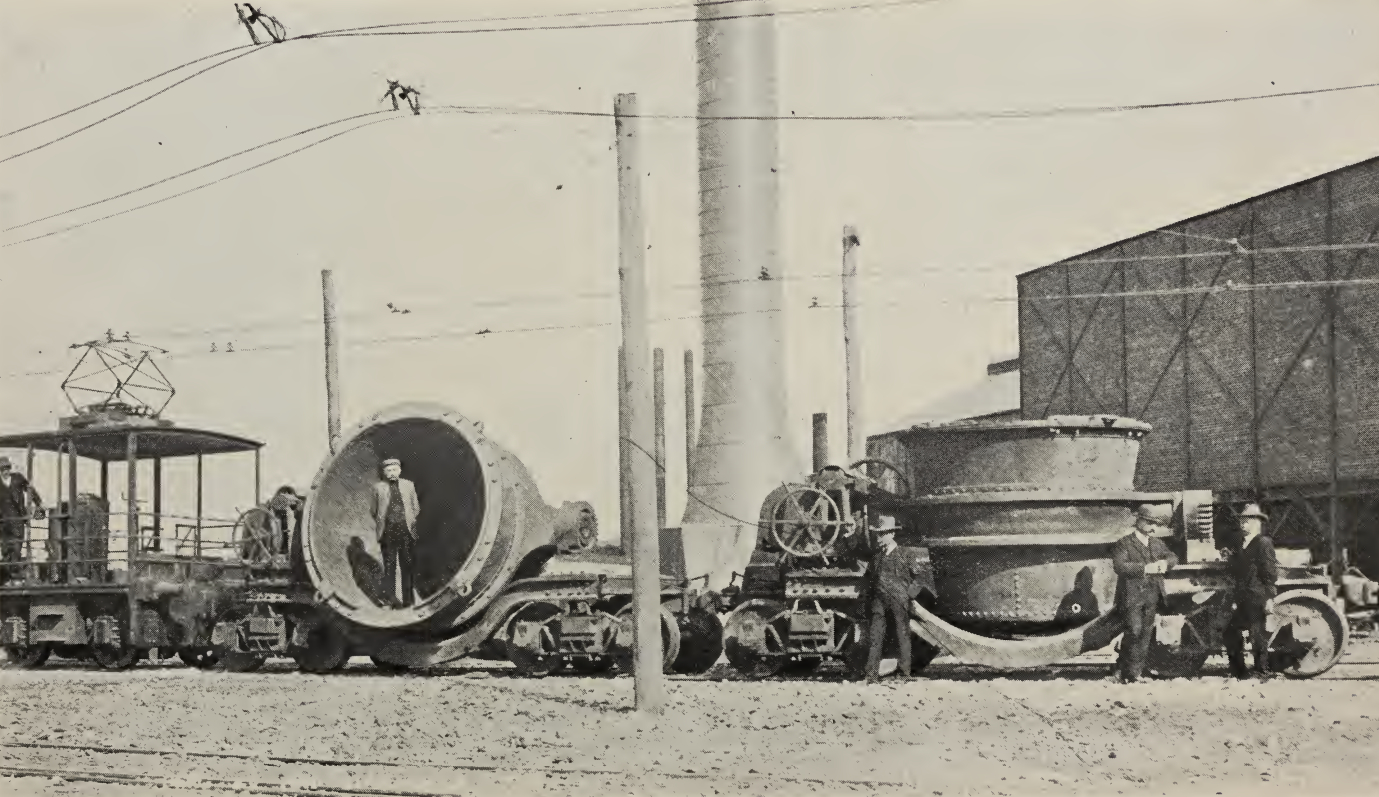
Electric 'motor' with pantograph, and two 25 ton slag ladle wagons, with the base of the furnace's chimney in the background (c.1911)

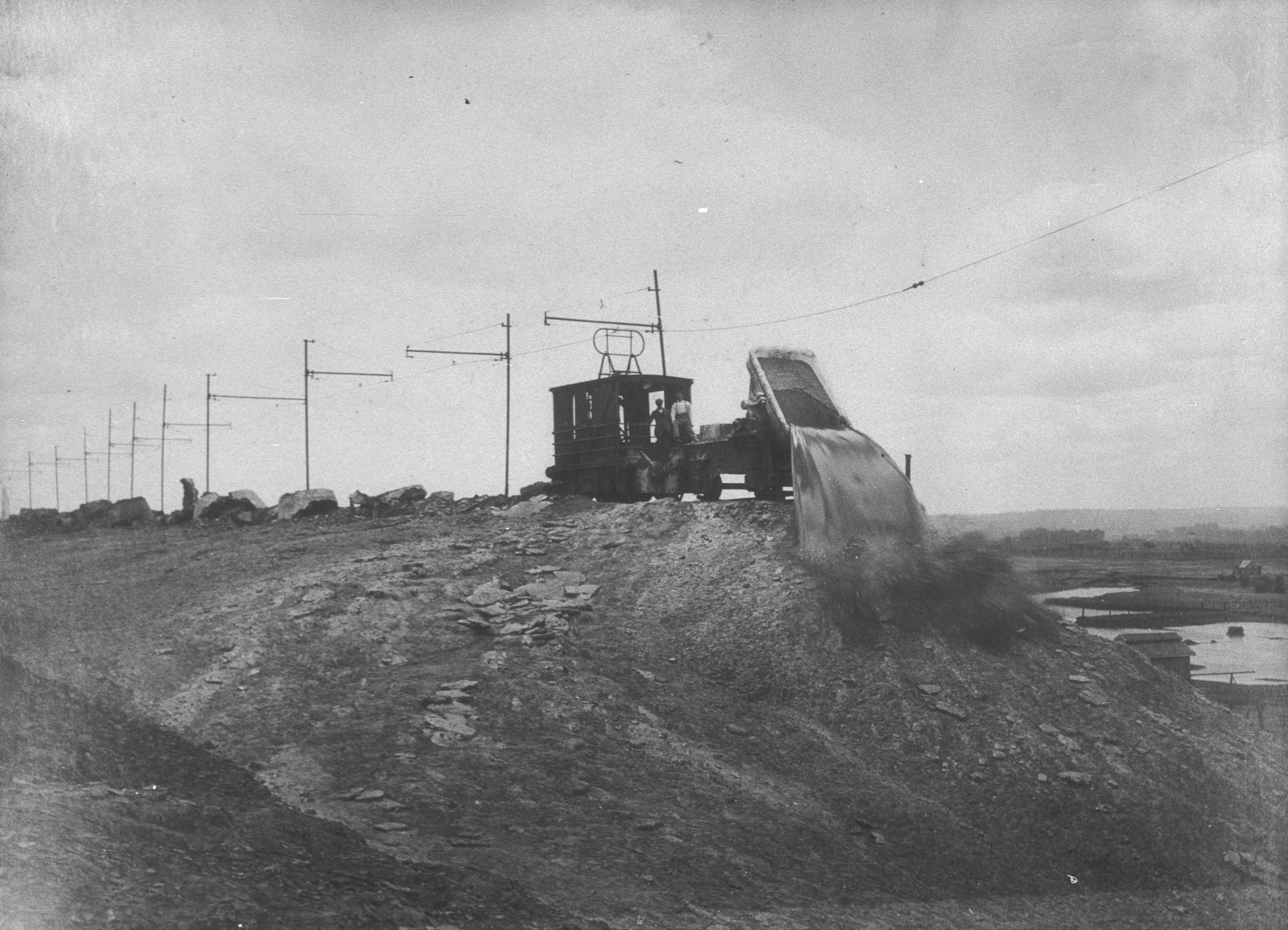
Tipping tailings at slag dump (1912)

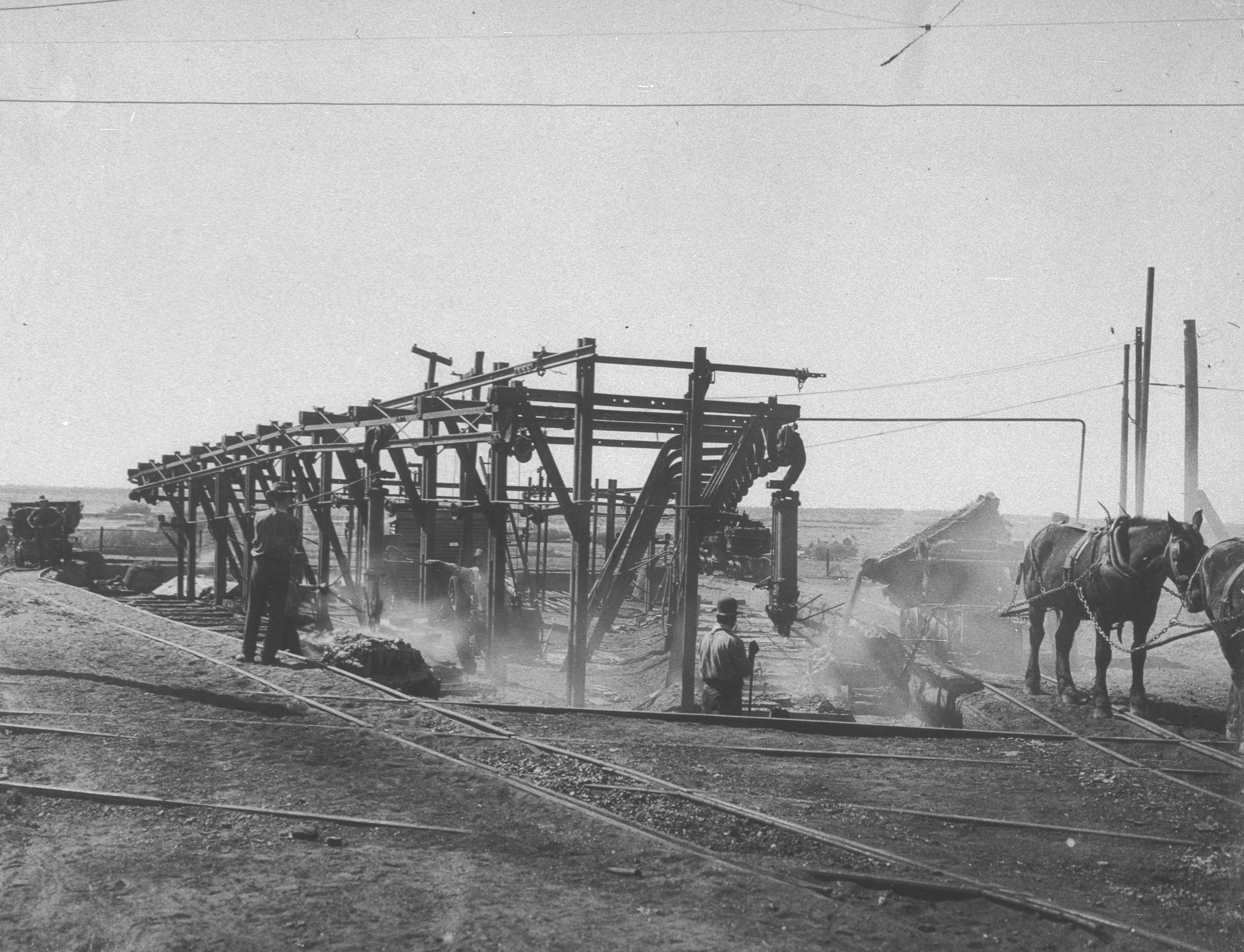
Molten low-grade matte, carried in pot cars over the narrow-gauge tramway, being poured at the 'matte ring' (1912)

A vestige of the narrow gauge (2 ft 6 in. / 762 mm) tramway that had been used under the Syndicate remained in use. It was used to convey wagons containing molten low-grade copper matte, drawn by horses, to an outside area, known as 'the matte ring', where it was cast in moulds. The matte was then broken up and fed back, in solid form, into the water jacket furnaces.

=== Ancillary plant ===
==== Water supply and mine pumps ====
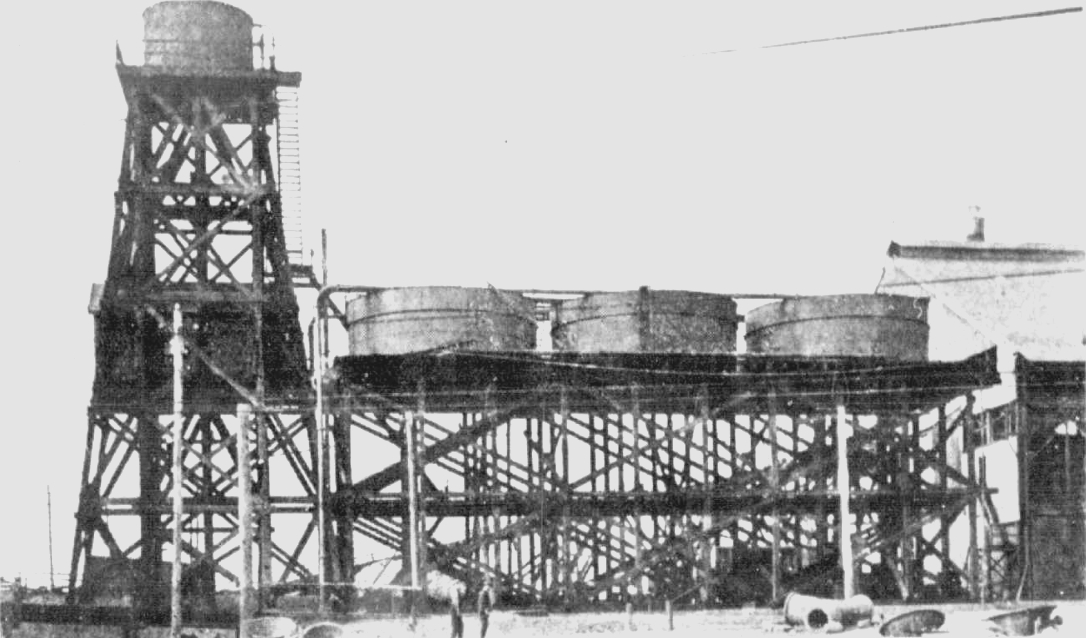
Water tower and tanks (1911).

Large volumes of water, including boiler feedwater, were necessary to cool the water-jacket furnaces and the froth flotation plant. The plant had a large water storage, a 'tank' or excavated dam. It also had a water tower and three water tanks on an elevated platform, which supplied the smelter.

In 1908, plans were in place to enhance the water supply by excavating 40,000 cubic yards to provide additional 'tank' capacity. By 1909, the mine tank had a capacity of at least 70-million gallons, however, in the semi-arid climate, it was rarely full.

Electric pumps moved about 40,000 gallons of saline groundwater per day from the mine into saline lakes, where it was lost to evaporation. In times of drought, in desperation, this saline water was sometimes used for cooling the water jacket furnaces, despite the resulting corrosion.

==== Coal and coke handling ====
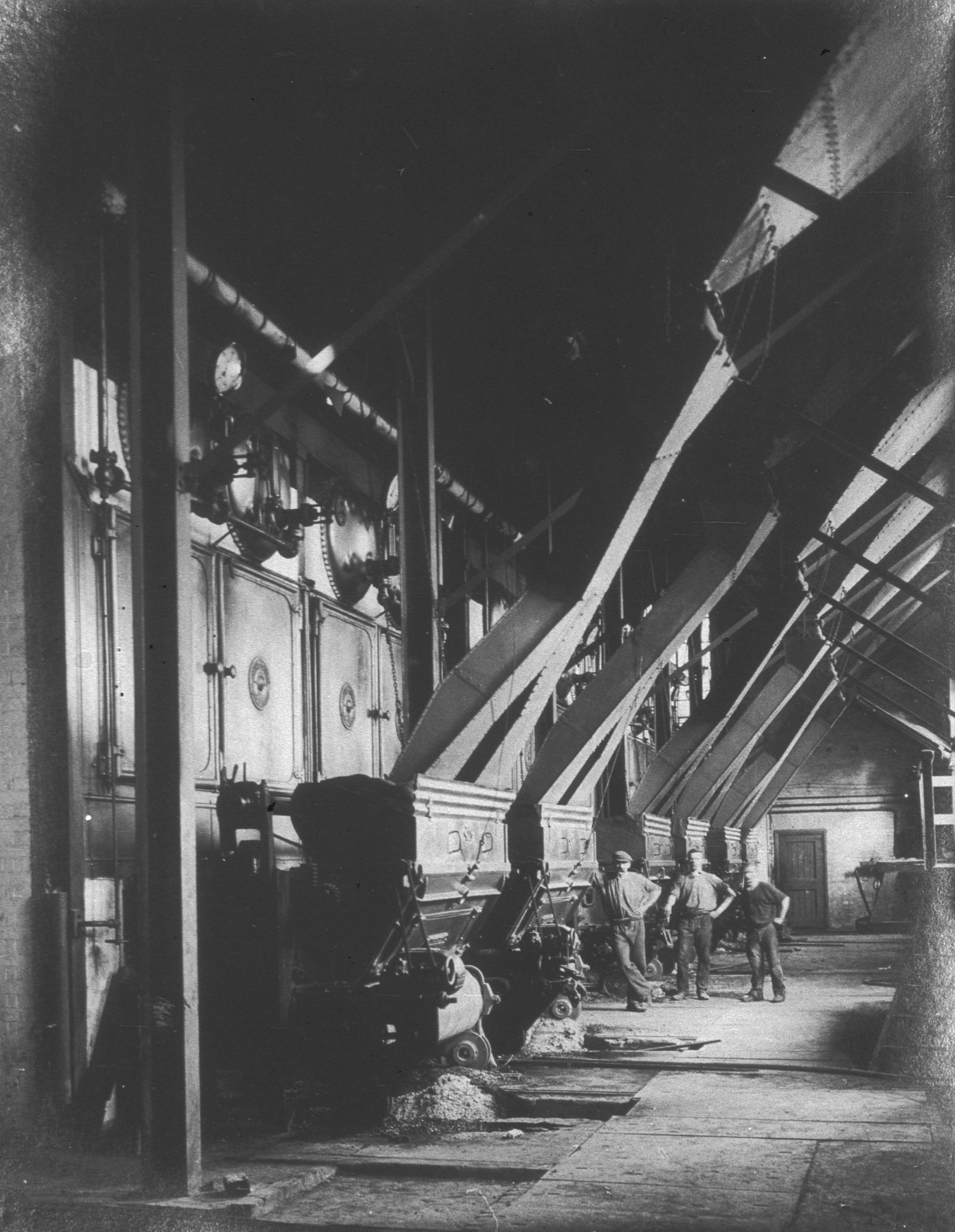
Boilers and chutes from overhead coal hoppers (1912)

Dependent upon having coke and coal available at all times, the mine site needed a buffer stock, in case of an interruption to shipments coming by rail. It had separate coal and coke dumps, each with its own siding where government wagons bringing the coal, mainly from Lithgow, were unloaded. Coal for the boilers was dumped into a bunker lying underneath the coal siding, from where a bucket conveyor carried it to overhead hoppers at the boilers.

==== Steam plant ====
Superheated steam for the plant was raised by six Babcock and Wilcox boilers, each rated at 450 horsepower (337.5 kW). The steam pressure was 170 pounds per square inch. The boilers used chain-grate mechanical stokers, with coal fed via chutes from overhead hoppers.

Steam was consumed in the powerhouse and by the mine winder engine. The powerhouse housed alternators, air compressors, and the air blowers for the water-jacket furnaces and converters; all were steam-powered.

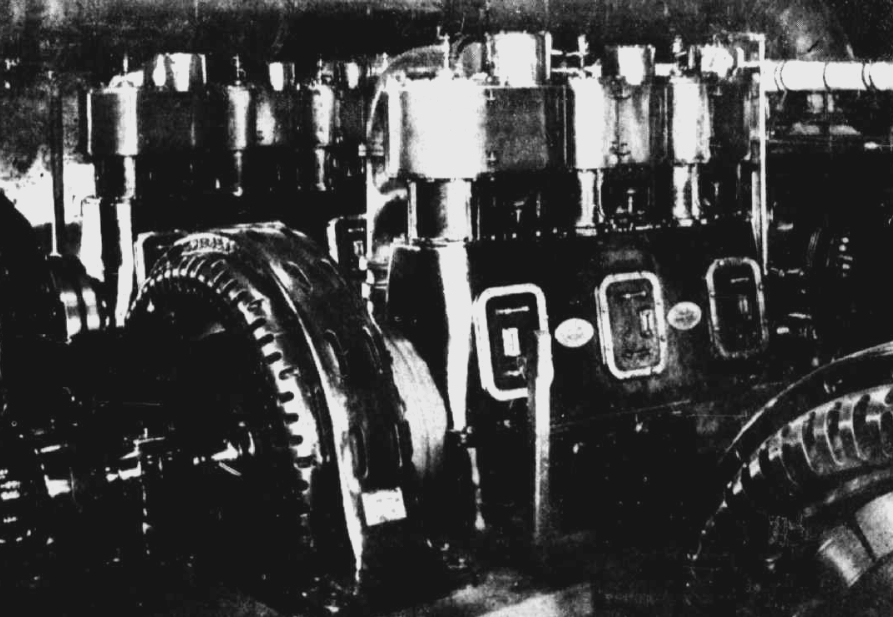
An alternator and its directly coupled steam engine (1911)

==== Electrical power ====
Electricity was generated using three 300 kW Siemens alternators, each powered by a directly coupled Browett-Lindley vertical triple-expansion steam engine.

Alternating current electricity was consumed by lighting, the mine groundwater pumps, water supply pumps, conveyor belts, and motor-generator sets. It was supplied as 440 V, three-phase, at 25 cycles per second.

Two Siemens 260 kW motor-generator set provided 250 V direct current electricity. The d.c. power was consumed by the overhead cranes at the smelter, the converter tilt mechanism drives, and the electric locomotives of the railway.

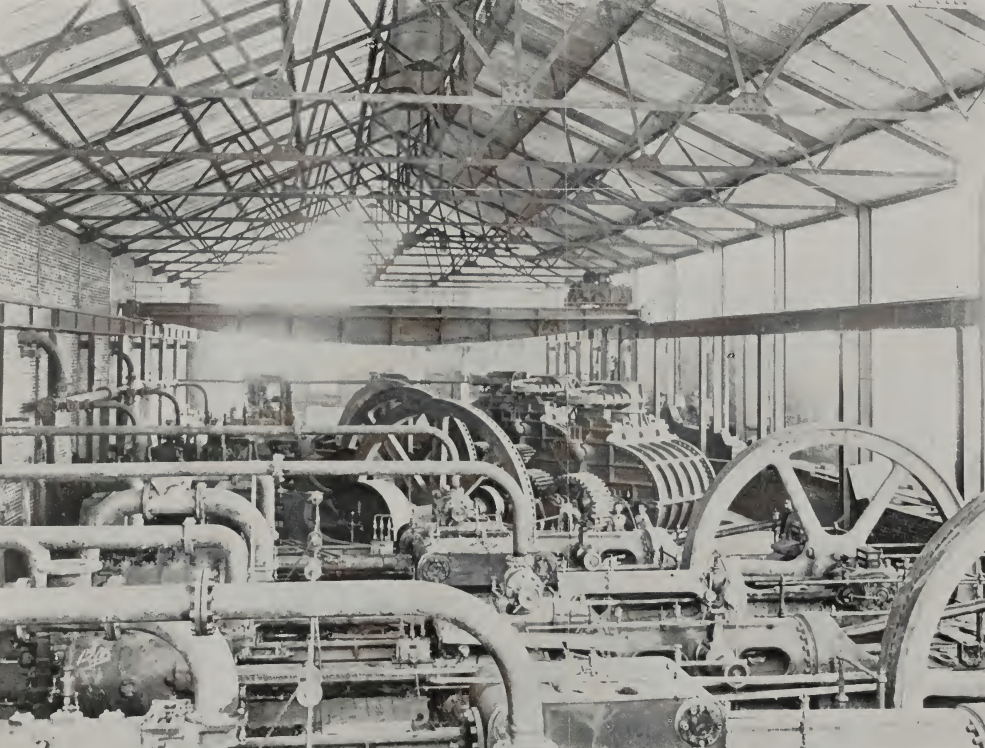
Compressors and blowers (c.1911)

==== Compressors and blowers ====
There were two cross compound steam-powered air compressors, made by Walker Brothers, each of which had a capacity to supply 25 rock drills.

The engine driving the converters was a cross-compound steam engine.

The Roots Connorsville positive-displacement blowers for the water-jacket furnaces, each had a displacement of 300 cubic feet of air per revolution. Each blower was directly coupled to a tandem compound steam engine, of 540 indicated horsepower, running at 110 rpm, and so providing an air blast of up to 33,000 cubic feet per minute. The blower engines were made by Walker Brothers, of Wigan.

==== Stores, workshops and maintenance ====
Operating a large, relatively sophisticated plant at a remote location required Great Cobar to perform its own maintenance. By May 1910, a new storehouse, machine shop, boiler shop, foundry, and carpenters' shop were under construction. Relining of convertor vessels took place in a dedicated area inside the furnace building.

Workshops and maintenance

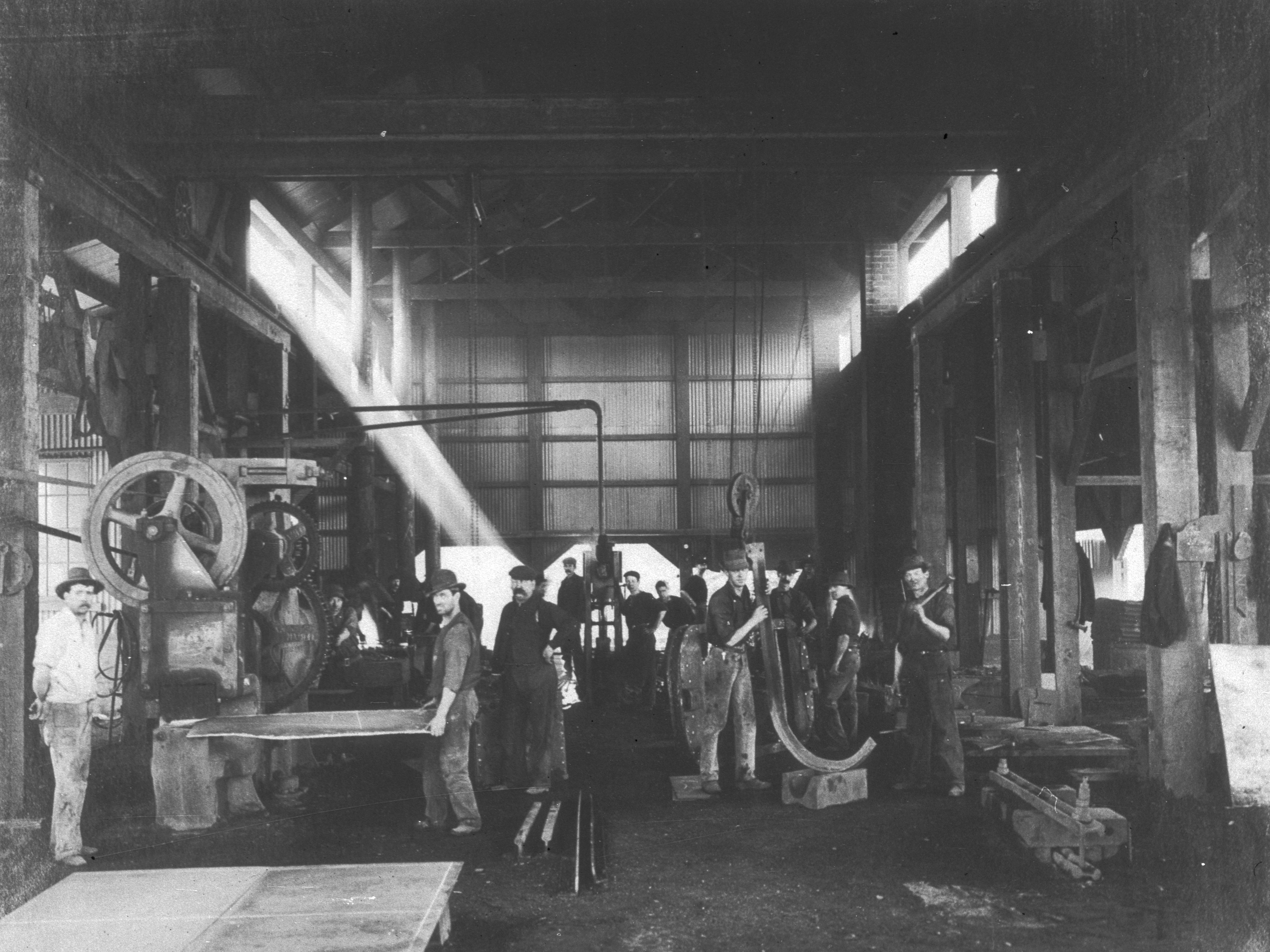
Machine shop (1912)

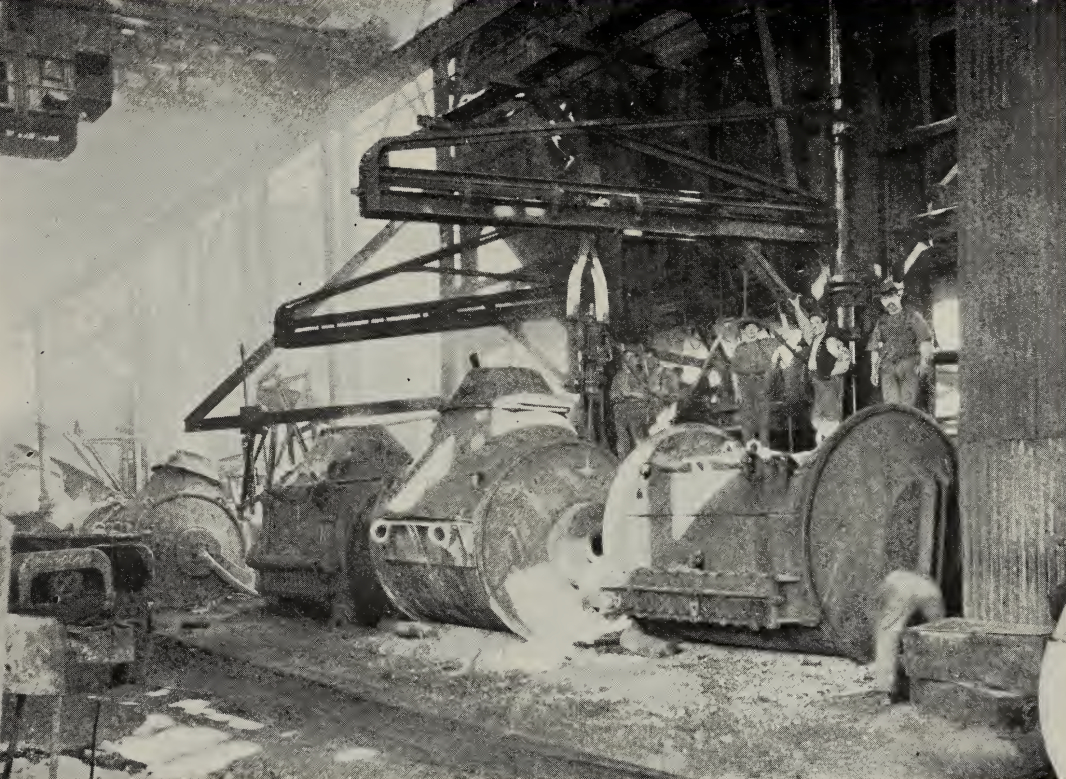
Relining Converter vessels (c.1911)

=== Operational difficulties ===
==== Mining operations ====
In 1912, net profit for the year was £168,617—buoyed by a rise in the copper price from £58 per ton in December 1911 to £79 12s in June 1912—but this profit was not high enough to allow a dividend. Conscious that even this level of profitability was precarious—dependent as it was upon the copper price—above all, the company pushed for higher rates of production, neglecting mine development for short-term high rates of ore extraction.

Although the surface plant was heavily mechanised, the underground mine was not. Rock drills were powered by compressed air, and blasting was used, but otherwise, underground mining was an entirely manual process, carried out by a large and expensive workforce. Mine skips (or "trucks") with approximately one-ton capacity were first filled at the ore face before being pushed to the "plat" over rails. The skips were then manually pushed into or hauled out of cages that were raised and lowered by the main shaft winder. At the lower levels, this task was done by the "platman" and his assistants, while at the surface, the corresponding task was done by "bracemen". A cage accommodated two skips at a time, and typically between 1,150 and 1,500 skips of ore were raised per 24-hour period. To maintain that level of production, a similar number of empty skips had to be returned, during the same 24-hour period, to locations within the mine where ore was being extracted.

The mine itself became a bottleneck in the vast enterprise, unable to deliver enough ore to the surface to meet the smelting furnaces' demands. In 1910–11, miners raised a total of 298,050 tons of ore, while another 6,243 tons came from the old dump at the Cobar Gold Mine; from this ore the company recovered 6,248 tons of copper, 22,048 oz of gold, and 109,421 oz of silver, with a total value of £372,046. But that was not enough.

In the year to 30 June 1912, the smelter handled a massive 418,318 tons of ore, for an output of 6,736.5 tons of copper, 37,696 ounces of gold, and 178,938 ounces of silver, generating a gross profit of £168,691 5s 9d. But after deducting debenture interest, new construction costs, and other expenses, it was still insufficient to pay a dividend. The mine had raised 40% more ore, but produced only around 8% more copper than in 1910–11.

From 1871 up to and including 1911, the mine at Cobar—including Chesney mine from 1904 and Cobar Gold mine from 1910)—mined 2,866,643 tons of ore and from it had produced 91,384.75 tons of copper, equating an average recovery rate of 3.19%. Total production had exceeded 100,000 tons of copper, by March 1913.

==== Ore grades ====
At the time of Carne's report, during the Syndicate-era, ore from Barton and Becker's shafts, when smelted, had averaged around 14% recovered copper. From 1871 up to and including 1911, the mine at Cobar—including Chesney mine from 1904 and Cobar Gold mine from 1910)—mined 2,866,643 tons of ore and from it had produced 91,384.75 tons of copper, equating an average recovery rate of 3.19%.

The average ore grade was falling, from 2.8% copper in 1910–11, to 2.6% in 1911–12. The company needed to mine more ore to maintain the same level of copper production. Mining at greater depths also increased the cost of ore extraction.

==== Smelting operations ====
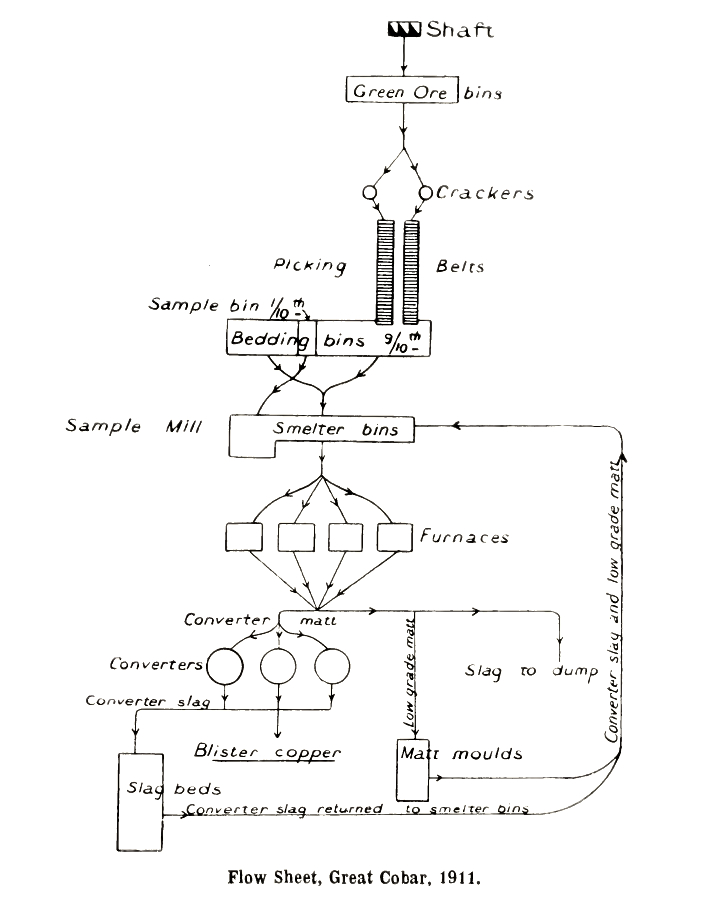
Process flow (1911). Note the recycling of low-grade solid matte and converter slag to the furnaces.

It had been intended that the smelting of ore in the water-jacket furnaces would produce a molten copper matte, which could then feed the converters producing blister copper. By 1910, it was apparent that the matte produced, from the initial ore smelting, often had too low a copper concentration to suit being fed directly to the converters. Instead, matte of 15 - 20% copper was solidified, mixed with ore and converter slag, and then used as furnace feed, for a second 'concentrating' pass through the water-jacket furnaces, which resulted in a matte of 27 - 38% copper that was suitable to feed the converters. Needless to say, this two-pass smelting approach came at a cost. Nonetheless, it became the means by which the problem was overcome, and was possibly one reason that a fourth water-jacket furnace had been added. It also may explain why the plant was never able to produce the 10,000 tons of copper per day that were originally expected.

==== Smelting losses ====
A problem was that too much copper was being lost during smelting; the recovery rate was 1.94% copper per ton of ore, meaning around a quarter of the copper in the ore (assaying 2.6%) was lost during processing, mainly in the slag. The effect was exacerbated by the two-pass smelting approach with copper being lost on each pass through the water-jacket furnaces. Converter slag was also recycled. Bellinger added a concentration and flotation plant capable of processing 700 tons per day to improve recovery by increasing the percentage of copper in the ore being fed into the furnaces.

==== Mine ventilation and dewatering ====
Ventilation of the workings was also becoming a problem due to the lack of mine development work; in 1913, the Inspector of Mines issued a compulsory order requiring the Great Cobar to excavate a drive connecting its workings to the neighbouring North Cobar workings to improve ventilation. Groundwater was also a problem; 40,000 gallons per day of corrosive saline water needed to be pumped out of the workings, using three electric pumps.

==== Mullock and collapsing workings ====
Longitudinal section of the Great Cobar mine, showing the extent of existing stopes (shown shaded) in 1911. The mine had reached the 12th level (approx. 1,200 feet).

Mullock was needed for backfilling, to raise the floor level of underground stopes, as miners extracted the ore, and to stabilize worked-out areas. There was a separate mullock shaft, down which mullock was dropped to the 300-foot level, from where it was distributed, as fill to raise the floor level of stopes as these were mined out. Coal ash from the steam boilers is used to supplement the mullock. In 1911, work began on an open-cut quarry, intended only as a source of mullock, not mineral ore. At first sight, this may seem a strange and wasteful practice, but in those times, with the ore being smelted in furnaces, much of the gangue material ended up in the form of slag, not mullock or tailings. Solidified slag was not suitable for mullocking.

Even with the quarry, the mullocking of the underground workings was not sufficient to prevent a large ground movement or "creep", in 1913, extending from the mine's No.9 level to the surface, which destroyed the workings above No. 9 level, and the inability to access some ore reserves. The loss of the ability to work those levels of the mine imposed another constraint on the amount of ore that could be produced, a significant impact for the struggling mine. Perhaps even more significantly, the upper levels were the main source of 'basic' ore and the ores became progressively more 'siliceous' as depth increased.

==== Types of ore and flux consumption ====
A pressing problem for the company was the type of ore that was being mined. Both 'basic' and 'siliceous' (or acidic) copper ore occurred at Cobar. Both types needed to be blended for smelting; otherwise, fluxes were required to effectively remove impurities, particularly iron, from the copper matte produced in the water-jacketed furnaces. As time progressed and mining went deeper, the ore from the Great Cobar became increasingly siliceous and higher in iron. The increasingly siliceous ore production at Great Cobar also meant that the ore from the Chesney Mine and Cobar Gold Mine was no longer suitable as a smelting flux; in fact, it added to the problem of too much siliceous ore. Instead, the Great Cobar smelters needed to bring in more limestone as a flux. In early 1914, the company was planning to open a quarry at Molong, capable of mining the 100 tons of limestone per day needed by its smelters.

A possible solution was to stop smelting at Great Cobar. One of the smaller mines in the region, the Queen Bee Mine, at Illewong, eventually stopped its mine site smelting operations altogether, and instead produced copper concentrate, which was shipped to the large E.R.& S copper smelter and electrolytic refinery, at Port Kembla, which had opened in 1908. However, the Great Cobar company had invested in a huge smelter at its remote mine site, and writing off such a large investment was always a very unlikely outcome. A flotation plant of a size needed to treat all of Cobar's ore would be immense. Moreover, by late 1913, it was apparent that the Great Cobar's own flotation plant, with a capacity of 50,000 tons per annum, was not meeting expectations.

==== Slag disposal ====
Some other Australian mine site smelters, notably Mt Lyell and Wallaroo, had granulated the molten slag by pouring it into water, producing a product which could replace mullock in filling operations. The Great Cobar just tipped its slag. There was the saline groundwater from the mine. However, the overall concept of the plant had not been conceived with slag granulation in mind, and retrofitting it would have been difficult and expensive.

The plant had been designed to dispose of 900 tons of slag per day, but at its final capacity, with lower ore grades, the required capacity rose to 1,450 tons of slag per day. Two types of slag ladle wagons were used, with capacities of 10 and 25 tons; a larger type with 35-ton capacity was not a success. Hauling just one slag wagon at a time, numerous short trips to the slag dump were necessary, each day, to maintain production. The heat and sulphurous fumes generated when tipping the molten slag made working conditions difficult during this operation. At night, the glow in the sky resulting from slag being tipped was visible, at Canbelego nearly 50 km to the east.

Slag disposal

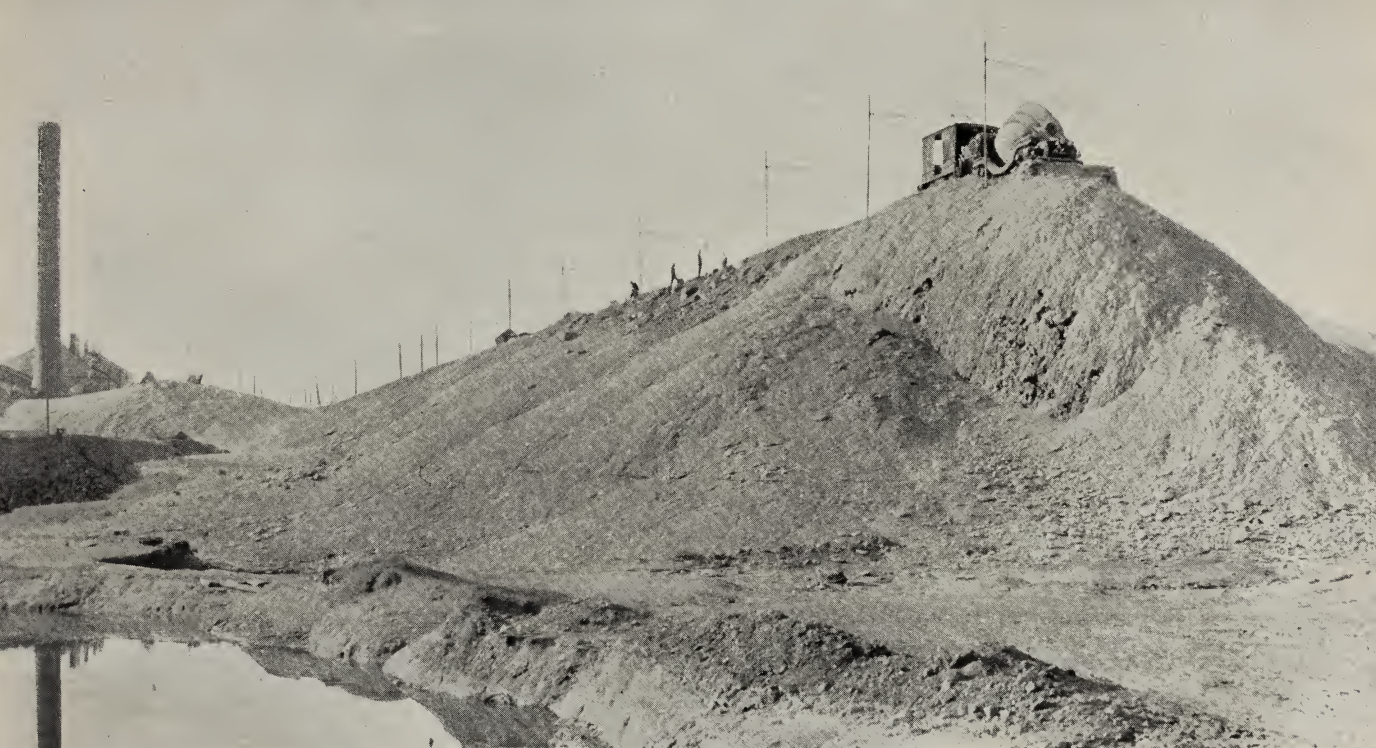
New slag dump c.1911, with electric 'motor' and slag ladle wagon.

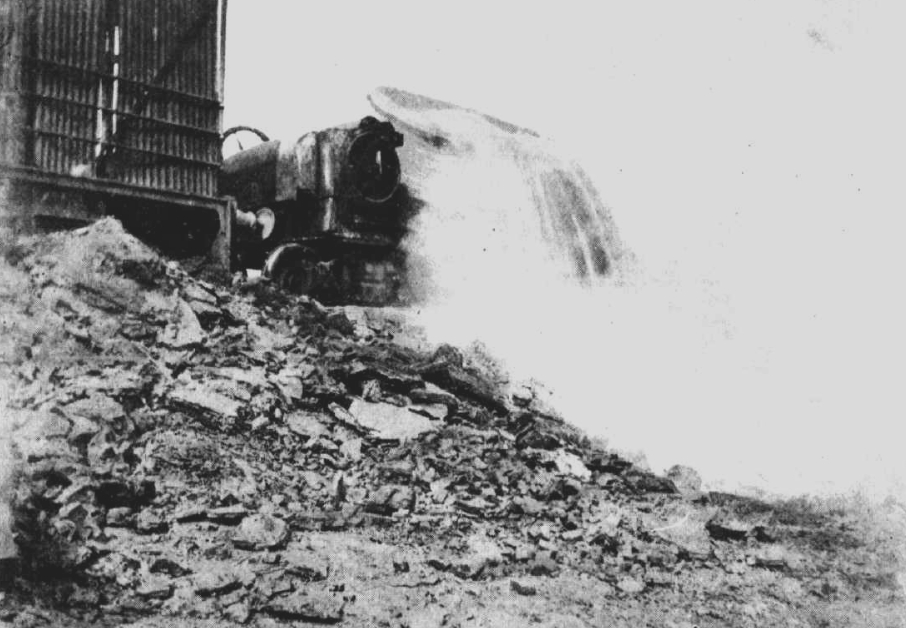
Tipping molten slag (1911)

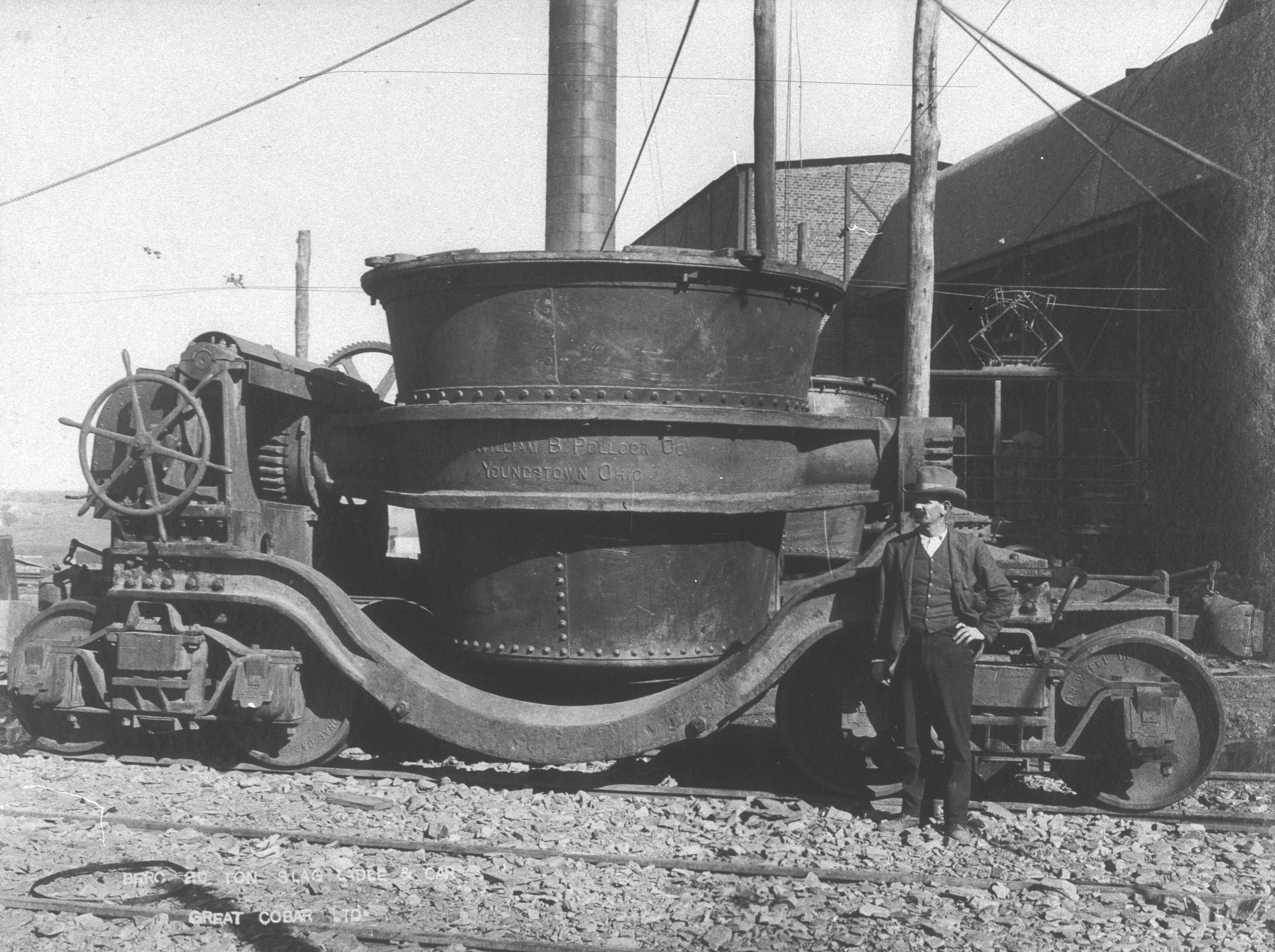
Slag ladle wagon (1912). The tipping mechanism was electrically operated but could also be operated manually.

==== Refining ====
The electrolytic refinery at Lithgow initially remained in operation under Great Cobar Limited, but was closed down in August 1911, retaining only the coal mine and coke works. From then on, Great Cobar sent the blister copper that it smelted at Cobar to America for refining.

==== External factors ====
Great Cobar was critically dependent on the Cobar railway line to maintain operations. Smelting had ceased for two months during late 1911 because a coal miners' strike had left the railways unable to carry coke and other materials to the Great Cobar. Remoteness from larger centres and the coast also brought difficulty in retaining a large and relatively skilled workforce.

=== Workforce and industrial relations ===
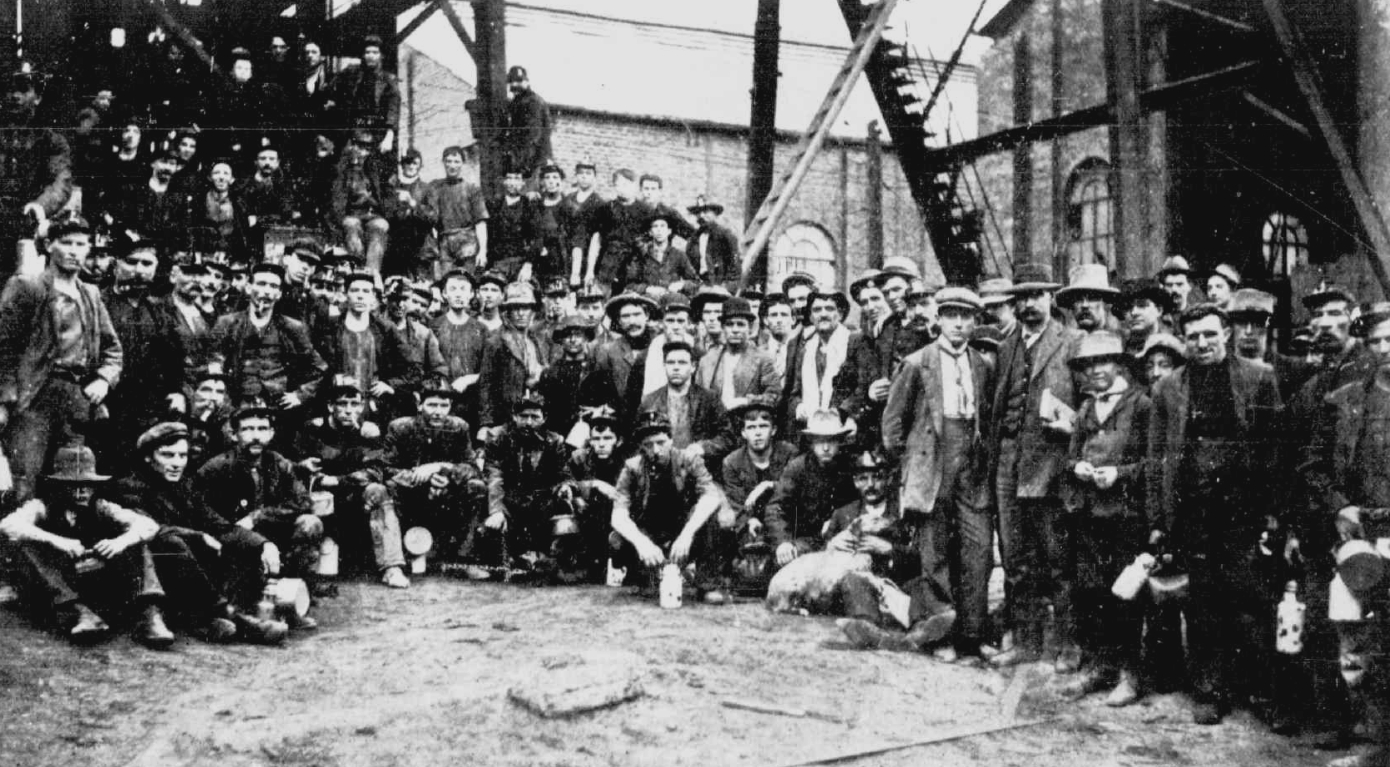
Afternoon shift (1911)

The economics of the new venture dictated that the mine would be worked on three shifts, seven days per week. Reducing the number of shifts could never be an option at Great Cobar because, at best, the mine could barely provide enough low-grade ore to feed the large smelter, which used water-jacket furnaces that were best operated continuously. That necessitated a large workforce and operational continuity.

Workforce relations did not get off to a good start while Kendall was in Cobar and Lithgow in September 1906. In public statements, he showed an uncompromising attitude to the unionised workforce.

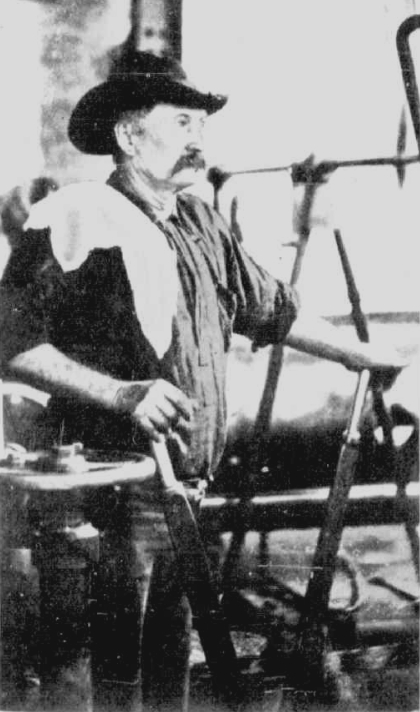
Winding engine driver at controls (1911)

According to Blakemore, in 1907, Cobar workers were well paid, with higher pay rates than elsewhere in New South Wales. All workers were on a six-day working week of eight-hour shifts in 1907. Mining labor average wages were 11 shillings a day, but many were earning up to 22s a day, and men working in the new main shaft averaged 30s a day. Furnace labourers got from 8s to 9s a day, and ordinary labourers got 8s a day. Blakemore had wanted to cover the seventh day by a new gang of workers, but unions were able instead to obtain additional overtime shifts at a rate of time-and-a-quarter, in a ruling by the Arbitration Court, and by threatening the company with strike action.

There were three major trade unions representing various workers. The Amalgamated Miners' Association represented the underground workers, the Smelters Union represented the smelter workers, and the Engine Drivers and Firemen's Association mainly represented the remaining surface workers associated with the mine winder, powerhouse, boilers, steam engines, and industrial railway. On occasion, the unions acted jointly as the Combined Unions.

A constant source of dispute was wage rates. Wages for different classes of employees were determined in different ways. Some were paid a wage per shift. Others, for example, those filling mine skips (or 'trucks') were paid by the 'truck' (around one ton of ore), and smelter operators had pay rates on a sliding scale based on the copper price. By 1912, the Company employed a total of 2,200 people, with 960 working in the mine and smelter, and its wages and salary bill was £23,000 per fortnight.

Cobar was a remote town with a large concentration of mine workers. Bellinger stated that it was difficult to retain workers there when jobs were available in "more fortunately situated" localities or on government construction projects. He specifically mentioned the construction of Burrinjuck Dam and the Sydney sewerage scheme. Bellinger stated that the mine workforce was short of 80 machine miners in late 1911 and blamed the inability to meet production targets on that labour shortage.

During his time as manager, Bellinger attempted to resolve some of the long-standing issues with the workers and was seen as conciliatory and open to negotiation. Unions complained that when wages were increased, prices in Cobar also rose accordingly. In 1912, to reduce employees' cost of living, rather than grant higher wages, a company-owned bakery and butcher shop were opened, selling only to company employees at controlled prices.

Another source of dissent between the company and its unionised workforce was the ever-present risk of work-related death or injury, and the union's practice of stopping all underground work for three shifts when a miner died from a work-related event. There were many such events over the years that the mine operated.

=== Accidents and fatalities (1908–1914) ===
Hard-rock mining was a dangerous occupation; the accident rate for Cobar district miners in 1912 was 109.3 accidents per 1,000 workers. Additionally, the surface works and smelters at the Great Cobar mine had many hazards, ranging from working at height to molten metal and slag. Serious accidents were commonly fatal.

In January 1908, while sinking the new main shaft, John Pascoe was struck in the head by a full bucket that had fallen from a height of around 125 feet, dying soon afterwards. In June 1908, James Cassidy, a 'platman' (a person who puts skips into and out of the winder cage, at an underground level), was killed by an unknown object that fell down the shaft. William Jackson was killed in a rockfall in November 1908. In late October 1909, a labourer, Ambrose Fox, died of burns to his head and body caused by an explosion of hot metal at a water-jacket furnace.

1910 was a particularly bad year; six died. In January 1910, James Craddock died from internal injuries after falling from an 18-foot-high scaffold. In May 1910, William Evans died from internal injuries he received while pulling down a structure. In September 1910, Edward Atkins died after falling, unseen by other miners, into an ore pass (a vertical or near-vertical opening made to provide more convenient material handling by gravity and to reduce haulage distances). In October 1910, two men died; a surface worker, Gerdhardt Weichmann, was killed, apparently, in an unexplained fall from a platform, and a miner, Walter Bender, died from injuries after a rockfall. In November 1910, Thomas Wells, stepped out of the wrong side of a cage, at the 9th level, into an open shaft compartment, falling to his death; the cage was required to have a bar preventing access to the other compartment of the shaft, but it was not in place.

It had been the practice of the underground miners to stop work for three shifts following a fatality. The sad events of 1910 caused significant disruption to smelter operations. In November 1910, Henry Bellinger, on behalf of the company, offered the workers an incentive to continue working in the future, except for two hours to attend the funeral. In return, if a levy of half a crown (or 2 shillings and 6 pence) were contributed to the widow from each miner's wage, the company would also contribute pound-for-pound. It was expected that an amount of around £275 could be given for the welfare of the widow and family of the dead miner. The union countered by offering to donate half a shift's pay if the company contributed pound-for-pound. It was to take until March 1913 for the company and the Combined Unions to agree. All mine workers contributed 2 shillings, and the company contributed 1 shilling, to a jointly administered Miners' Accident Relief Fund; mining work was to continue, but workers had 2 hours off, at their own expense, to attend the funeral.

1911 was another bad year, with five fatalities. In February 1911, Charles Stokes died in a hospital after he was severely burned in an explosion of hot slag. Also in February 1911, John Jolly died of peritonitis after being crushed against a wall by a crane. Frank Welsh died in April 1911, succumbing to the injuries he received when a rock knocked him into an ore pass, and he was buried, except for his head and hands. In August 1911, a miner, Oliver Rafferty, was working on a boring machine, when he overbalanced and fell backwards onto a pile of rocks, hitting his head, and then rolling 25 feet down an ore pass; he died on the way to the hospital. In December 1911, Thomas Attwater, a shunter, fell between the electric locomotive that he was climbing into and a slag pot, after a handrail broke, and then was run over; he died at the hospital. In December 1912, Henry Love died after a blast in an ore pass in which he was working.

1913 was yet another bad year, with six workers' deaths resulting from work accidents. In April 1913, Walter McEvoy died after seven hours in hospital, after a blasting accident had ripped open his abdomen. In June 1913, a Romanian miner, Giames Piter, was killed in a fall of earth. In July 1913, a pump driver, Arthur Sara, attempting to cross a railway line, caught his foot and was run over and killed by an electric locomotive. In August 1915, Stanley Hutchings was caught between two trucks, was badly injured, and died two days later. In November 1913, Simon Burrs was boodling (moving material by shovel) when the heap, upon which he was standing, collapsed; he fell headfirst, and was completely buried, dying of asphyxia while he was being freed. In December 1913, Walter Wardle, a shift boss at the furnaces, fell backwards off a ladder and died. Also in December 1913, a labourer named Edwards, was badly injured when a bale arm—a type of spreader bar used when cranes lifted pots (or ladles) of hot metal—fell on him while he was working near the convertors, and died while in shock caused by his injuries. In January 1914, an assistant manager, Albert Luff, was killed by a rockfall while he was inspecting a stope.

Accidents, if not fatal, could result in a life-changing disability. Maurice O'Donnell lost his right hand and a part of his arm when a blasting charge detonated prematurely in February 1911. In November 1911, Thomas Jobson, an engine driver in the surface workings, caught his left hand in a conveyor belt, and his arm needed to be amputated at the elbow. A Russian employee, John Atnor, was trying to remove a broken wooden handle from a hammer head in November 1913, using dynamite. His shattered forearm was amputated below the elbow.

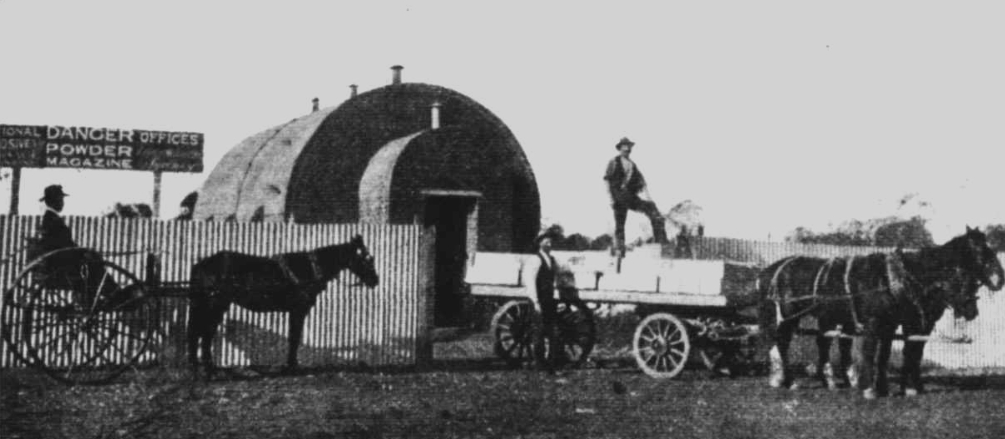
Explosives magazine in 1901.

There were also some remarkable survivals and near misses.

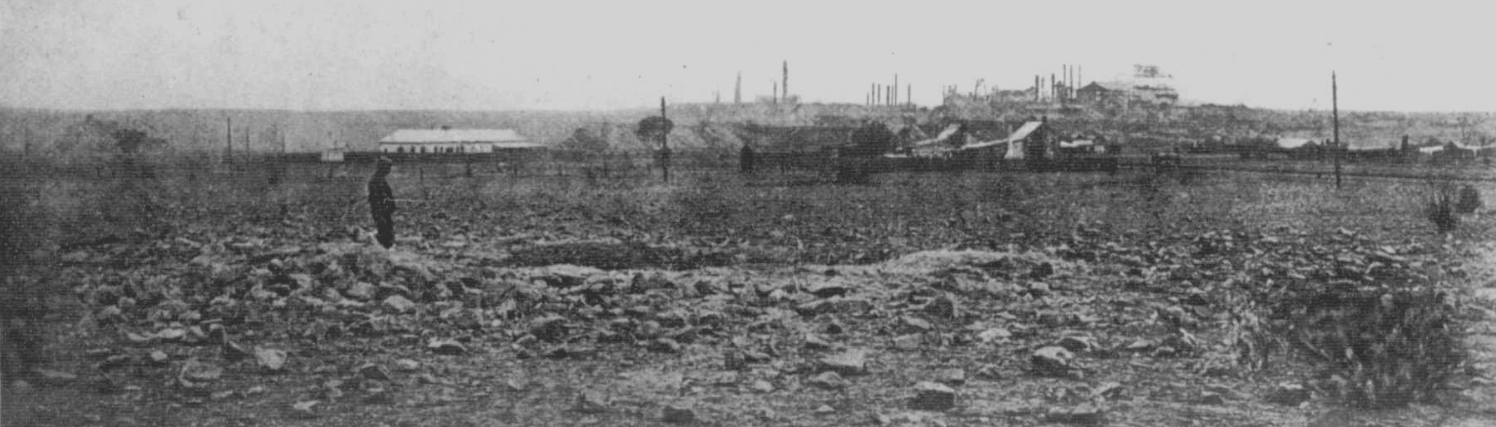
Site of the magazine, after the explosion (Feb. 1908)

While the new plant was under construction, on 25 January 1908, a spectacular explosion destroyed the mine's 30-year-old explosives magazine, which stood well away from the mine itself. The total weight of blasting explosives held in the magazine at the time was 2,285 lbs, slightly over a ton. It was first noticed that the magazine was on fire, then a small explosion occurred, lifting off the roof, followed 15 minutes later by an enormous explosion. Fortunately, there had been time for police to warn most residents of the adjacent villages of Dapville and Wrightville of the impending danger, and to prevent anyone using the road between Cobar and Wrightville. There were no serious injuries and, aside from the magazine's destruction, very little property damage.

In January 1910, a shift boss at the Great Cobar concentrators named Delaney had left his work to rescue a goat from a dog when he fell into an unprotected mine shaft. He fell around 110 feet, but when rescued, was found to be not seriously injured by the fall. Later that year, in March, a cage, fully laden with ore, fell down the shaft after a link broke, but there were no injuries.

=== Elusive profits and financial difficulties ===
The prospectus issued at the time of the float, in May 1906, had stated that the then existing plant—producing 4,000 tons of copper annually—was capable of earning a 15% dividend on the newly issued Great Cobar share capital. That left the new company's board little choice but to pay an initial dividend, for the year 1907, while the new plant was under construction.

In 1907, the company paid shareholders a 15% dividend totalling £112,000; by the next year, the directors regretted that they had not retained it, as the costs of the new plant began to be incurred. Reportedly, within three months of paying the dividend, the company's balance sheet was in the red, by £24,000. It would be the company's first and last dividend to its shareholders.

By August 1909, a newspaper report subtitled "Parlous Position of Mine and Finances" reported that, after paying the debenture holders, the company had incurred a net loss of £500. It pointed out that this was in fact an artificially low amount, because in company's accounts, "No provision has been made out of profits, for depreciation, preliminary expenses, underwriting commission, and discount on debentures", and by making a loss there was no contribution to a sinking fund—intended to be £100,000 per annum drawn from profits—for the eventual redemption of the crippling debentures.

Around March 1909, settlement was granted on the last £200,000 of its authorised debentures, and the proceeds were used to pay down the company's bank overdraft. Of course, that further increased the debenture interest payments.

The company tried to raise more capital, and in November 1910, its authorised capital was increased to £1,000,000, by the issue of 30,000 new £5 shares. However, the directors also enacted a right to apply any new capital to the sinking fund for the redemption of debentures, which had been intended to be funded from profits.

The inability to pay dividends affected the company's ability to raise new share capital. By the end of 1911, only 15,000 of the 30,000 new shares had been issued to shareholders. With existing Great Cobar shares trading below their £5 face value, there was no reason to take up the remaining 15,000 shares.

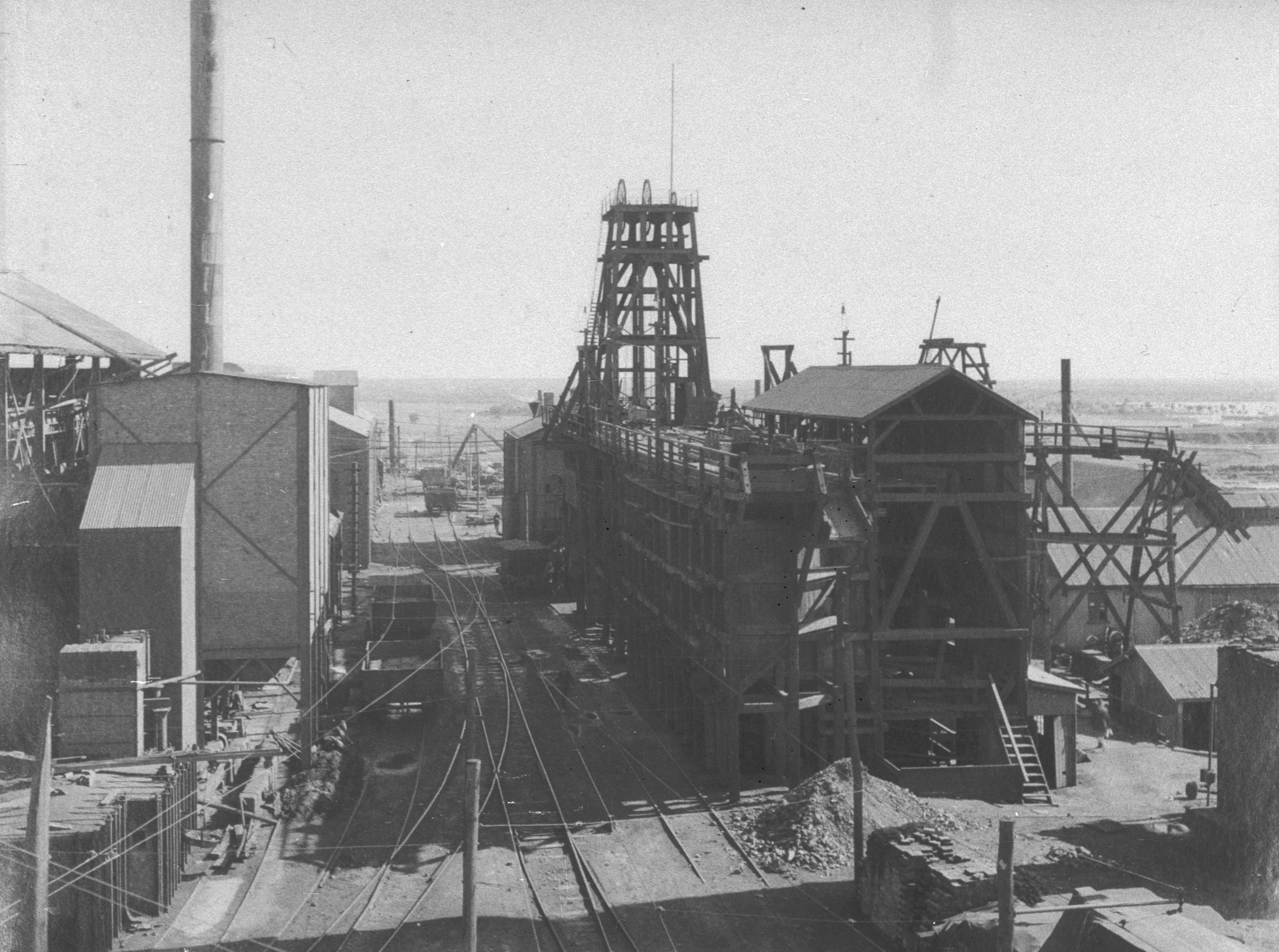
Great Cobar, smelter (left), with the chimney for the converters, and main mine shaft and headframe (right), with 'green ore' bins structure in right foreground. The view looking south, June 1912.

The company had expended as much as £500,000 on the new plant at Cobar by mid 1912, well in excess of the original budget of £160,000. The supply-only cost of the imported equipment was £71,225, to which was added much-resented import duties of £26,000. From these costs alone, it was apparent that the original budget was woefully inadequate; barely £62,000 was left for transport to the site, foundations, equipment installation, local equipment purchases, buildings, chimneys, and sinking the new shaft.

There were additional costs for items not in the original scope, introduced by Bellinger's plant modifications of 1909–1911; expansion of smelter capacity by one third (fourth furnace and third converter) and the corresponding proportionate increases in scope for the overhead cranes, powerhouse, water system, and industrial railway; then there were two new reverberatory furnaces needed to make copper anodes (replacing Lithgow anode furnaces, after that plant closed in 1911), ore bins and conveyors, the flotation plant, workshops and a foundry, and development of the new mullock pit and water reservoir.

The cost blew out, before even considering the financial impact of writing off the value of the hitherto profitable plant from the days of the Syndicate, namely three water-jacket furnaces at Cobar and the refining plant at Lithgow. The cost blowout also severely constrained the already-limited working capital of such a large enterprise.

On 30 June 1912, the estimated ore reserves of the Great Cobar mine were 1,813,087 tons, assaying 2.6% copper. To that could be added 302,174 tons at the Cobar Gold Mine and 663,349 tons from the Chesney Mine, totalling 2,777,610 tons, with another 350,000 tons that were viable to mine at Great Cobar at a suitably high copper price. At the smelting rate of 1912, 418,318 tons of ore, its ore reserves would be exhausted in around seven years, foreseeably as soon as 1919. Even if the mine had been profitable, its economic life would be short, limiting the return on the capital investment.

In 1912, net profit for the year was £168,617—buoyed by a rise in the copper price from £58 per ton in December 1911 to £79 12s in June 1912—but this profit was not high enough to allow a dividend. The result underscored that much of the improved financial performance was driven by a high copper price and that profitability was precarious. By early July 1912, with the copper price in London at £76 15s, Great Cobar shares were still trading below face value, at £4 3s 7 1/2d.

Wages and salaries for the large workforce were an unavoidable cost; in 1912, they amounted to £23,000 per fortnight, or nearly £600,000 per annum. The profitability of the Great Cobar's operations was sensitive to increased wage rates and to the productivity of its workforce.

In 1913, the venture made a gross profit of £116,281, but this was offset by debenture interest payments, debenture redemption, and expenditure on the new flotation plant, leaving a net loss of £23,210.

A decrease in the price of copper to a range of £65 to £70 during 1913 led to further financial difficulties and a drop in share price to 17s 6d, in mid-December 1913, and to only 6s 3d by January 1914. Bellinger resigned on 10 November 1913, following a visit to Cobar by one of the company's English directors, Mr. W. Pellew-Harvey, who was also an internationally experienced mining engineer. Bellinger took up a position in Chile. Upon his return to London, Pellew-Harvey gave a report highly critical of Bellinger's management of Great Cobar.

The company held its annual general meeting in London on 17 December 1913. The meeting decided to place the management of the Great Cobar operations in the hands of Bewick, Moreing, and Co., a firm of consulting mining engineers and mine managers. It recognised that there had been a woefully inadequate allowance for depreciation—insufficient even to cover the write-off of the old Syndicate plant— but did not call a halt to the loss-making operations, which were burdened by the crippling interest payments to debenture holders.

On 30 December 1913, an informal meeting of shareholders, highly critical of the board's actions, was held. A report of the meeting stated, "In regard to finance, the directors had not shown themselves any more expert than they had in dealing with the machinery. The initial mistake was over capitalisation The purchase consideration amounted to over £1,000,000 talking in round figures and the preliminary expenses to £160,000 leaving only about £114,746 working capital which was far too small and the company had been suffering in consequence, Why was so high a price paid for this property? The prospectus showed that the vendor bought it for £800,000 and sold it to the company for £1,006,000 and for finding subscriptions for shares and debentures to a total of £1,000 000 he received a commission of £140,000 of which £50,000 was paid in cash. Thus £350,000 of water was introduced into the capital. For this there were no assets on the other side of the accounts." Two of the dissident shareholders stood for election to the board of directors, but were defeated by incumbent directors in a ballot.

In January 1914, George Blakemore, by then the managing director of the rival C.S.A. Mine, wrote to a newspaper stating that Great Cobar was in financial strife. He saw the huge plant at Cobar as "largely a lamentable waste of money"—by his calculation £470,000—and he opined that the production cost of copper from Great Cobar's operations was then more than double what it had been in 1905, under the Syndicate's management. He foresaw a company reconstruction, based on some joint operation of the C.S.A. and Great Cobar Mines, as a solution to what he saw as the otherwise intractable problems of the Great Cobar's smelting operations, particularly the imbalance between 'basic' and 'siliceous' ores. Supplying low-grade 'basic' ore from C.S.A. to the Great Cobar was one justification for a new branch railway to the C.S.A. mine, something Blakemore and C.S.A. Limited wanted. Potentially, joint operation may have allowed C.S.A. Limited to emerge as the dominant partner and perhaps acquire the vast Great Cobar assets at a discount.

The general manager of the Great Cobar, George Baker, rebutted Blakemore's claims. He instead pointed to a 25% increase in labour costs, poor relations between management and labour—implicitly blaming the previous general manager, Herman Bellinger, for the problem—and lower labour efficiency due to the greater depth of the mining operations. In the end, the precise reasons did not matter; the financial bottom line did.

An ominous sign was the price of the debentures: by the end of 1913, only £55 for a £100 debenture face value, supposedly redeemable for £105. The company had paid the 6% interest on the debentures, up to that time, but the heavy discount apparently was due to fear of a future default. The informal meeting of shareholders, on 30 December 1913, had carried a resolution to vote for a change in management at the next annual general meeting, but the debenture holders would be the first to act.

=== Receivership and aftermath ===
On 7 April 1914, it was reported in London that the debenture holders had appointed a receiver, Arthur F. Whinney, of the firm, Whinney, Smith, and Whinney. Mr. George C. Klug, representing the firm of Bewick, Moreing, and Co., would be the new manager of the Great Cobar. There would be a complete and indefinite cessation of all operations, including even the company's bakery and butchers, throwing about 1,000 men out of work at Cobar.

Work continued on essential tasks, such as filling mined-out stopes with mullock, to stabilize them. The receiver in London authorised this work to begin, during May 1914, and an electrically powered conveyor was installed to move the mullock to the mullocking shaft. During this work, there was another fatality. In June 1914, Arthur Henwood's lifeless body emerged from a mullock pass, but how it came to be there was not known. An inquest determined that he died from suffocation.

At the beginning of August 1914, the filling work had largely been completed when a cable arrived from London, resulting in 160 of the remaining workers being laid off. Initially, around 60 men were kept on to complete the remaining work. The events in Europe leading to the outbreak of the First World War, paradoxically, had caused a fall in the price of copper.

Many miners left Cobar or sought employment at other mines in the district. One of the local newspapers, The Cobar Herald, went to weekly publication in August 1914, before merging with the town's other newspaper, The Western Age.

By the beginning of September 1914, only twenty men were employed, and the only activity was the operation of the mine pumps. The pumps were kept running until 6 September 1915, when pumping stopped for the first time in 24 years. The engine drivers agreed to work for nothing for another fortnight, to prevent the mine from filling. During that time, it was hoped that the NSW Government would provide a loan to assist the receiver in reopening the mine. The Premier, William Holman, announced, in early November 1915, that the government would provide the loan, clearing the last obstacle for a recommencement of operations.

== Operations during receivership (1915–1919) ==
=== Reopening ===
Following the outbreak of the First World War, vast quantities of copper were needed for brass casings of bullets and shell cartridges. The price of copper rose in response to the demand; the British Government sought to control supplies of the metal in its colonies and the Dominions. Reopening Great Cobar would not only have the potential for profitable operation by the receiver, but also had a patriotic dimension, supporting the war effort.

Mr. W. Pellew-Harvey—in the role of a consultant this time—visited the mine and identified that £102,000 was needed to restart operations. A meeting of the debenture holders in May 1915 carried a resolution authorising the receiver to take the necessary steps to reopen the Great Cobar operations. The receiver attempted to raise the full amount, at 6% interest, from the debenture holders, but only £62,000 was raised. At the instigation of the local representative of the receiver, David Fell, the remaining £40,000 was allocated to the New South Wales Government, which agreed to similar terms as the participating debenture holders. At this lower level of capitalisation, it was estimated that the mine would provide a 23% return.

With the finance in place, the company's receivers, in early November 1915, gave instructions to recommence operations, with the plan to resume smelting ore again by the beginning of February 1916. The Great Cobar and Chesney mines had already been pumped out, then repairs to the Great Cobar's main shaft were made, and gradually operations restarted. The first blister copper was produced in early February 1916. By mid-March 1916, a second furnace was in production, and the plant was capable of producing around 12 tons of copper daily.

In October 1916, the British Munitions Department agreed to buy the entire production of most of the larger Australian copper mines, including Great Cobar, for £120 per ton.

High copper prices assisted the reopened Great Cobar, but none of the operation's earlier difficulties had been resolved. The imbalance of 'basic' and 'siliceous' ore, in particular, became ever more acute. By then, mining was occurring at the lower levels of the mine, making it more difficult to bring it to the surface. Neither had the workforce issues diminished.

=== E. Hogan Taylor ===
Edgar Hogan Taylor (1878 – 1949), better known as E. Hogan Taylor, was a metallurgist and a graduate of the South Australian School of Mines. He began his career at the BHP smelters at Port Pirie. He was working in the Western Australian goldfields by the end of 1903. He was later the metallurgist and, from mid 1908, the manager of the large Perseverance gold mine, at Boulder in Western Australia. In 1913, around the time that Taylor left the Perseverance mine, there were concerns—later proven false—that the gold there was petering out.

Hogan was appointed superintendent of the Great Cobar mine in 1914, when it was uncertain whether the mine would reopen, and only mine-filling operations were in progress. He would be the last manager of the mine, under the title of resident manager, with overall control of the mine being in the hands of the London-based receiver, Arthur F. Whinney (1865–1927) and the receiver's local manager, accountant and former mayor of the Municipality of Manly, William Horner Fletcher (1851–1931) of David Fell & Company.

Taylor was confronted by serious industrial relations problems, less than a year after the Great Cobar mine reopened. However, he also had to deal with the ongoing problem of insufficient 'basic' ore and, related to that problem, an increasingly disharmonious relationship with C.S.A. Limited, owners of the C.S.A.mine.

After leaving Cobar, in 1919, he managed the Laloki Mine, a copper mine in Papua, where the Great Cobar's ex-chief engineer and ex-metallurgist also found employment. From late 1925, he was general manager of Burmah Corporation's vast lead-silver mine and smelter at Namtu, also known as the Bawdwin Mine, in what was then Burma. He retired, in 1941, and died at his home in Toorak, Melbourne, in November 1949.

=== Workforce relations ===
In early June 1916, engine drivers went on strike, with the miners also striking in support. The industrial action seemed for a time to threaten the operations that only recently had been re-established with the assistance of the NSW Government. Some saw the strike action as disloyal, in a time of war, when copper was needed for munitions, but the unionists claimed that they had no alternative left before striking.

In early February 1917, agitators from the Industrial Workers of the World (I.W.W.) held open-air meetings in Cobar; they recruited new members, resulting in violent altercations with members of the miners' union.

In October 1918, smelter operations were briefly suspended due to low levels of ore in the bins, Mr E. Hogan Taylor, the manager of the mine, explained the suspension was due to four causes, all related to the workforce; abnormal absenteeism following pay day; absences due to influenza; underground workers had struck for two days following the fatal accident in which Patrick Hannan died; and a general shortage of workers over a period of many weeks.

=== Accidents (1915–1919) ===
Just after work at the mine had recommenced, in November 1915, there was a freak accident in which a miner, Fred Oding, was killed. He fell out of a cage that had unexpectedly jolted upward to around 10 feet above the surface. He then tumbled over a divider, into the open shaft compartment, grasped the divider briefly, and then fell to his death. In March 1916, a miner, Alftred Murray, died of severe injuries that he received in a rockfall, a fractured skull exposing part of his brain, a fractured thighbone, numerous lacerations, and shock. In September 1916, Joseph Buckley lost his footing and fell heavily. The large piece of heavy timber that he was carrying on his shoulder also fell, breaking his neck and killing him. In December 1916, George Green was killed in a rockfall. Tom Glasson died in February 1917, after falling down an ore pass. In March 1917, two men, Charles Naughton and Samuel McCaughey, were killed when six tons of rock from the roof of a stope fell on them. In April 1917, a miner, James Bond, suffered numerous fractures, in all four limbs, but no head or internal injuries, and remained conscious, after he fell down an ore pass, in what was described as a "Bond's extraordinary escape". In October 1918, Patrick Hannan was crushed to death in a rockfall. Late in the mine's life, in January 1919, there was a near miss, when an empty cage dropped 1,400 feet down the main shaft, smashing into the bottom.

=== Contention with C.S.A. Limited ===
In its heyday, the Great Cobar was the dominant copper mine of the Cobar field, but that status was no longer uncontested by 1916. In 1910, the C.S.A. Mine—until then a modest silver-lead mine—identified a large copper resource. The chairman of its board was the ex-general manager of the Great Cobar, George Blakemore, and he aggressively pursued a policy to make the expanded C.S.A. the dominant mine on the field.

An extension of the railway line from Cobar to the C.S.A. Mine, at Elouera to the north of Cobar, was under construction during 1917, and it opened in January 1918. One of the reasons that had been used to justify the railway extension was to ship low-grade 'basic' ore from the C.S.A. to the smelters of the Great Cobar Mine; it would be mixed with Great Cobar's 'siliceous.' ore, mainly as a flux for smelting, replacing limestone brought from much further away by rail. Such an arrangement held out a lifeline to the Great Cobar, but was never begun.

In 1917, the C.S.A. started using the first of its own water-jacket blast furnaces at its mine site. Some observers saw this as an illogical move—the huge Great Cobar smelters already existed and would soon have a rail connection to the C.S.A— and not the best outcome, considering the Cobar region as a whole. By early 1919, there was an acrimonious disagreement between the management of the two companies, likely driven by the unresolved dispute over which company would dominate copper production in the Cobar mining field. The outcomes were that Great Cobar did not take any of C.S.A.'s low-grade ore as flux, Great Cobar still needed to source limestone, and the new railway was under-utilised, although the railway branch line was still of great benefit, but to C.S.A. only.

== End of operations (March 1919) ==
=== Closure ===
In the end, the existential threat to the Great Cobar came from the falling price of copper, after the end of the First World War in 1918. During the war, copper was £135 per ton, falling to £122 after the Armistice, and by March 1919 to £78, with the prospect of a further decline. At the prevailing copper prices, the Great Cobar's vast operations were no longer profitable. At 4 pm on 16 March 1919, smelting operations ceased. The Great Cobar mine and its smelters had closed, throwing hundreds of men out of work in Cobar.

Over the life of Great Cobar Limited, the company had paid only one dividend of 15 shillings on its £5 shares, but had paid interest to the 6% debentures holders, up to the time of the appointment of the receiver in 1914. After 1914, the shareholders were no longer involved, having lost both all their money and control of the company. The debenture holders were also repaid the £62,000 that they had advanced in 1915. Also repaid, with 6% interest and a bonus, was the £40,000 loan from the NSW Government made in the same year.

== Aftermath (1919–1965) ==
=== Possible resumption ===
For a time, hopes were held that the mine would reopen. The NSW Treasurer stated that the government would not provide financial assistance to reopen the mine. After the mine closed, affected mine workers were given a weekly relief payment, for each adult and dependent child, but also could be granted a free railway pass to encourage them to leave Cobar. The NSW Government identified around 1,500 job openings in other parts of New South Wales. Apparently, many workers initially stayed in Cobar, preferring to live on relief payments, expecting the mine to reopen. The NSW Government ended the relief payments and free railway passes, on 14 April 1919, around a month after the mine closed.

In May 1919, Hogan Taylor announced that the equipment in the mine up to the No. 10 level had been removed and that the pumps were being shut down, leaving about six months before water would reach that level. The pumps were stopped, but in August 1919 Hogan Taylor announced that dewatering would recommence to keep water below No.11 level, to protect the stopes there and on higher levels.

Any expectations of the reopening of the Great Cobar furnaces were doomed. A report by the NSW Mines Department concluded that the mine was unprofitable, highlighting yet again the lack of basic ore. The report raised the possibility of smelting remaining ore from the Great Cobar and Chesney mines at the newer C.S.A. smelter at Elouera. However, the C.S.A. Mine, once seen as key to solving the lack of 'basic ore', was itself facing difficulties due to low copper prices, and remained closed until September 1919. In the end, it could never supply the much-needed 'basic ore', or be operated jointly with the Great Cobar, because by mid-1920, it too was totally closed, due to an underground fire.

David Fell formulated a plan to start a limited operation to produce copper concentrate, by the flotation process, at another mine owned by Great Cobar Limited, the Cobar Gold Mine (Fort Bourke Mine). There were some tests conducted on the flotation process, and an expert, Mr C.S. Faul, from the Minerals Separation company, visited Cobar, in September 1919, to report on capital and operating costs of the process. Around the same time, the Great Cobar's resident manager, E. Hogan Taylor, announced that he would be leaving the service of the company's receivers. In late 1919, some exploratory mine work was commenced at the Cobar Gold mine, in connection with the flotation tests.

It would need £100,000 in new capital to establish the flotation scheme at the Cobar Gold Mine. The limited operation was envisaged as just the first step in a larger initiative to link the mines in the area by light railways, and operate the mines in the Cobar area as one joint operation, eventually perhaps resulting in mining resuming at the Great Cobar. Fell's plan did not win support of the debentures holders.

=== Final end ===
In June 1920, the receiver in London issued an order that the assets of the Great Cobar be realised. The Great Cobar was to remain closed, permanently.

Over the entire life of the mine, from 1871 to final closure in 1919, total production was near to 110,000 tons of copper, of which over 50,000 tons was produced during the years that the mine was run by Great Cobar Limited or its receiver.

The assets were advertised for sale, by tender, in March 1921. The proceeds of the sale would be applied to a part repayment of the debentures and other outstanding debts and liabilities. The debenture holders were owed £667,300, but the holders of the company's worthless shares reportedly lost £932,000.

=== Sale of assets and demolition ===
In August 1921, the Great Cobar mine and smelter assets at Cobar were purchased by A.A. Goninan, a Newcastle-based engineering company, which only wanted to dismantle some large industrial buildings and relocate them to its site, at Broadmeadow, and sell off or scrap the rest. The electrolytic refinery at Lithgow had been closed since 1911, and parts of its equipment were sold and relocated to the C.S.A.'s new, but short-lived electrolytic refinery at Kandos. The Lithgow site was sold to its neighbour, Hoskins Iron and Steel, as was the Great Cobar's coal mine. Hoskins also purchased 12,000 tons of coke left at the Cobar site and some rolling stock—bogie ore wagons, matte wagons, and end-dump slag wagons—all of which went to the steelworks at Lithgow. Old, worn-out slag wagons were scrapped. Goninan took the wooden hopper four-wheel ore cars to Newcastle, where they were refurbished and sold to collieries, for use as 'non-air' wagons.

Demolition of the Great Cobar plant began quickly, with the largest chimney demolished in October 1921. The large building previously used for the furnaces and converters and its overhead gantry cranes was bought by English Electric. They reused the building and cranes in a new foundry at Clyde. The foundry had 1.5 miles of internal railway. The "ugly-looking but very powerful electric locomotive" used there, quite possibly, was one from the Great Cobar.

Valuable machines that could be relocated easily were stripped from the plant. The overhead crane from the powerhouse ended up at the Hebburn No.2 Colliery, in the South Maitland Coalfields. Hebburn Collieries also bought the two motor-generator sets, where they supplied supplied direct current to the colliery and parts of the township of Weston, until 1946. Two of the locomotives from Great Cobar were sold to the same colliery; the chassis of one was converted to a guard's van, and the other was converted to an electrically-operated yard crane. The electricity generating equipment sold for £35,000 and was disassembled and relocated, by rail, to Wagga Wagga. It was reinstalled in the new power station and supplied the regional town from May 1922 until March 1928. By February 1924, the only substantial piece of machinery still at the site was the winding engine. The winder ended up at the Steelworks Colliery at Lithgow.

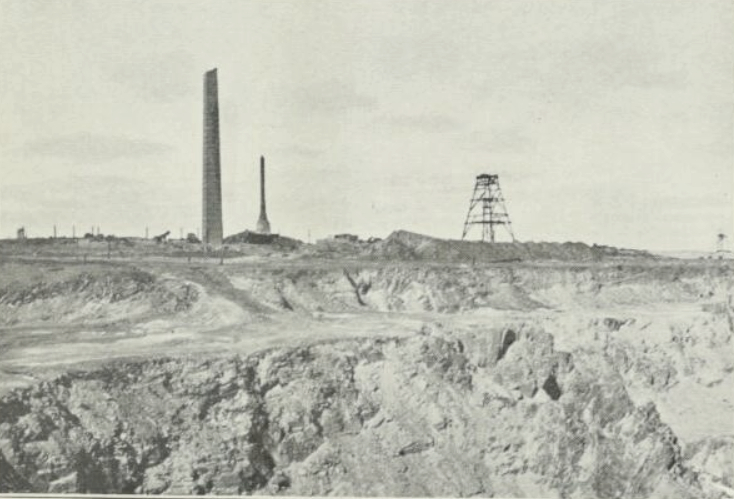
What was left of the Great Cobar, c.1934. The tallest of its chimneys had been toppled in 1921. The larger of the two remaining chimneys had already lost its highest 12 feet, which collapsed in 1931—leaving the chimney with the sloping top shown in this photograph—and it was later demolished, in 1935. The poppet head—its steel structure shown shown still standing In this photograph—was damaged, during the fire of September 1933. The ore bins were destroyed in the same fire. The smaller remaining chimney was demolished in 1957.

=== Abandoned mine site ===
A visitor to Cobar, in 1928, observed "a fine panoramic view of the Great Cobar Copper Mine, situated within a quarter mile distant. Extending to the right is a huge mountain of melted slag, resembling in appearance some prehistoric monster, lying there dormant forever. Turning slightly to the left you see the foundation and lower portion of Australia's mightiest chimney stack now demolished. Then you see the remains of the power-house, and lying amongst the ruins, and broken bricks, are the enormous flue pipes of the copper smelters, tangled and broken as though having collapsed in disgust."

In September 1933, a huge fire ripped through what remained of the Great Cobar. The fire was deliberately lit, with the ore bins and the poppet head set alight. The poppet head collapsed—or at least the timber structures within it did—and burning debris fell down the main shaft, setting fire to underground timbers. The town was enveloped in dense, choking, sulphurous smoke from burning timber and ore. It was expected that the fire would burn for a week—there being no means to suppress the fire—until there was nothing combustible left above the waterline. The chimney for the converters was blown up, for its bricks, in September 1935.

Some brick and timber structures remained on the site. These were demolished during a site clean-up in 1957, after the site was taken over by Cobar Mines Proprietary Limited, a subsidiary of Broken Hill South. The company also demolished the last remaining steel chimney and the gantry structure of the ore bins. It erected a new poppet head and winch, and carried out some dewatering operations, at the Great Cobar, presumably to explore the old mine, The site remained of interest into the mid 1970s, but the mine never reopened.

=== Impact on Cobar ===
The final closure of the mine, by far Cobar's largest employer, was a huge blow to the town, but the employment situation rapidly worsened.

The closure of the Great Cobar was just the first in the Cobar region, taking with it the Chesney Mine, at Wrightville, which it owned and which depended upon its smelter, and the Cobar Gold Mine. In 1920, the C.S.A mine at Elouera closed unexpectedly due to an underground fire, as did the Gladstone Mine, at Wrightville, which used that mine's smelter. In July 1921, the Occidental Gold Mine at Wrightville closed, and the widespread expectations that it would reopen were dashed in July 1922. After the Mount Boppy Gold Mine, at Canbelego, finally closed, in 1922, there were no longer any large mines working in the Cobar region, and there would not be until work resumed at the Occidental Mine, subsequently the New Occidental Mine, in 1933. Only the gold mine at The Peak, to the south of Wrightville, remained in operation after 1922, and it continued to operate—under various owners—until 1953. Many miners and their families left the district altogether.

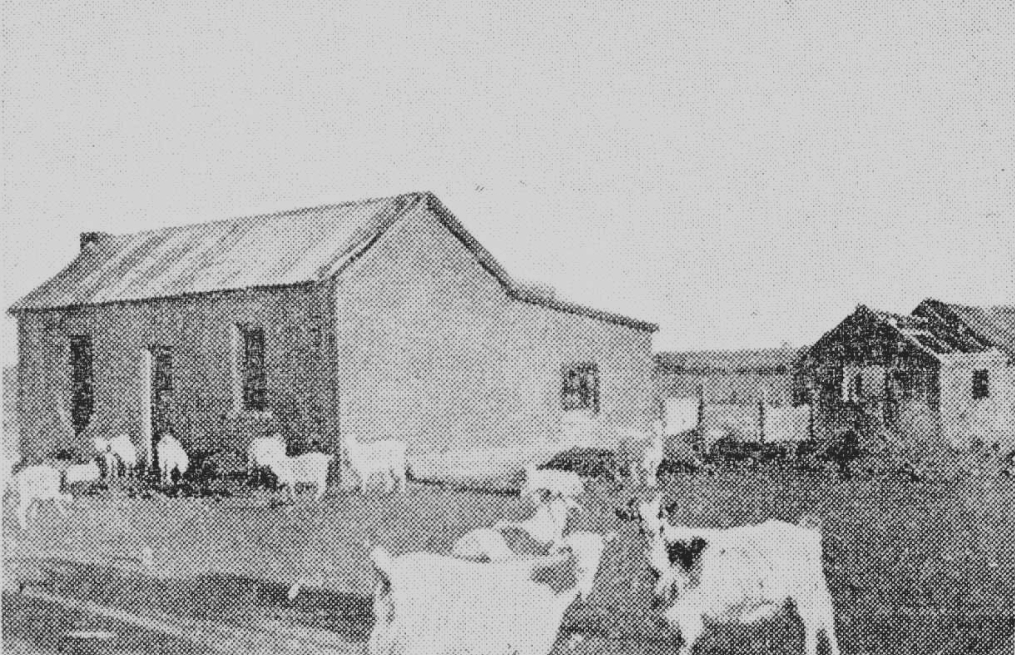
Abandoned houses and feral goats in Cobar (c.1928)

The effect of the mine closures on the town of Cobar was dramatic. One of the earlier impacts was that the town lost its electric street lighting in 1920. It was reported, in 1924, that 700 houses had been demolished and removed, that another 700 houses had fallen or were in ruins, and that many of its hotels were shuttered. By mid 1926, the population, which had in better times been as high as around 7,000, had fallen to "600 or 700", and three in every four shop buildings in the main street were vacant. The public school and large hospital were still open, but both had many unused rooms. In 1926, the twelve-room house once occupied by the manager of the Great Cobar could be rented for one shilling per week, but there were no takers at that rent.

Later in the 1930s, two of the mines once owned by Great Cobar Limited, the Chesney Mine and the Cobar Gold Mine, were reopened by the New Occidental company, and both worked until 1952. The rival C.S.A. mine was reopened in the 1960s, and continues in operation.

The town of Cobar survived the two lengthy interruptions in mining activity, but its population never returned to that of its heyday, when the Great Cobar was operating.

== Remnants ==
The administration office building of the Great Cobar mine has become the Great Cobar Museum and Visitor Information Centre. It survived by being bought by a local man, in May 1925, and would otherwise have been demolished.

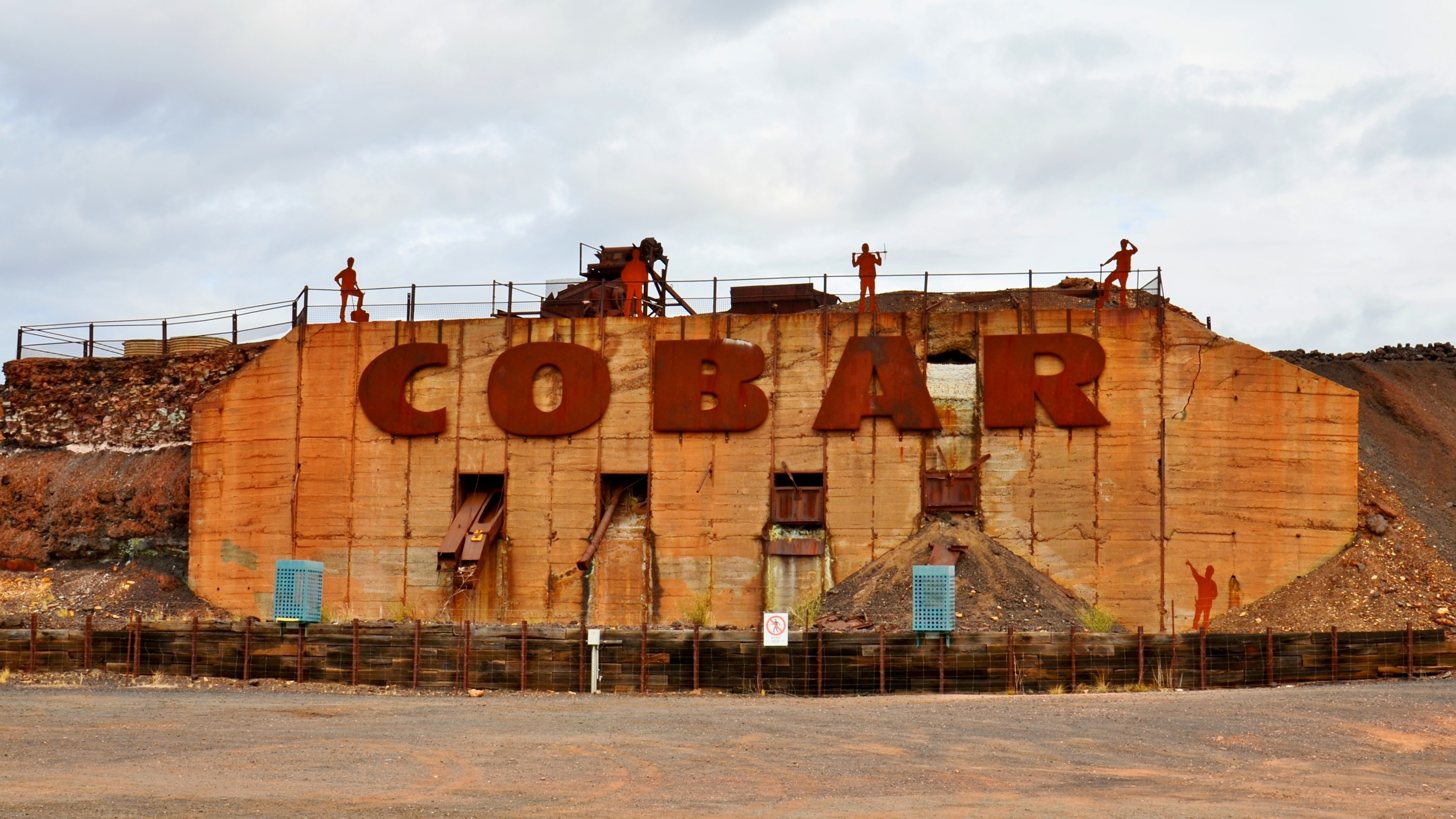
Cobar welcome sign (2017). The concrete structure is a relic of the Great Cobar mine.

Over a century after the mine's closure, much of the remaining Great Cobar mine site is fenced and off-limits to the public for safety reasons. Behind and to the south of the museum is a large piece of land which was once the mine and smelter site, and some ruins and remnants. The open-cut mullock quarry is now a lake on the site. At the southern and eastern ends of the site is the vast black-coloured slag dump. In the north-eastern corner of the site, the concrete structure supporting the huge 'Cobar' sign, at the entrance to the town, is a relic of the Great Cobar mine.

Some converter vessels from the Great Cobar have been recovered and provided to the heritage centre. One of the electric locomotives used at the mine—the one which became a colliery brake van but has been partially restored—is also preserved at the heritage centre.

The first 'Mine Tank', the mine's first water reservoir, dating from 1878, exists to the east of Kidman Way. The larger, second 'Mine Tank', dating from 1882 and greatly expanded by 1909, is now the lake in Newey Reserve, in the south of the town, which has been controlled by Cobar council since 1932.

Cobar Cemetery is the final resting place of many who died as a result of fatal accidents at the mine and also of Sidwell Kruge (later Dean) who first identified the rock samples from Cobar as copper ore, and the first mine manager, Captain Thomas Lean.

The ornately engraved share warrants of Great Cobar Limited are still traded, sometimes at prices higher than their £5 per share face value, as do its debenture certificates and share certificates, but only as collectables.

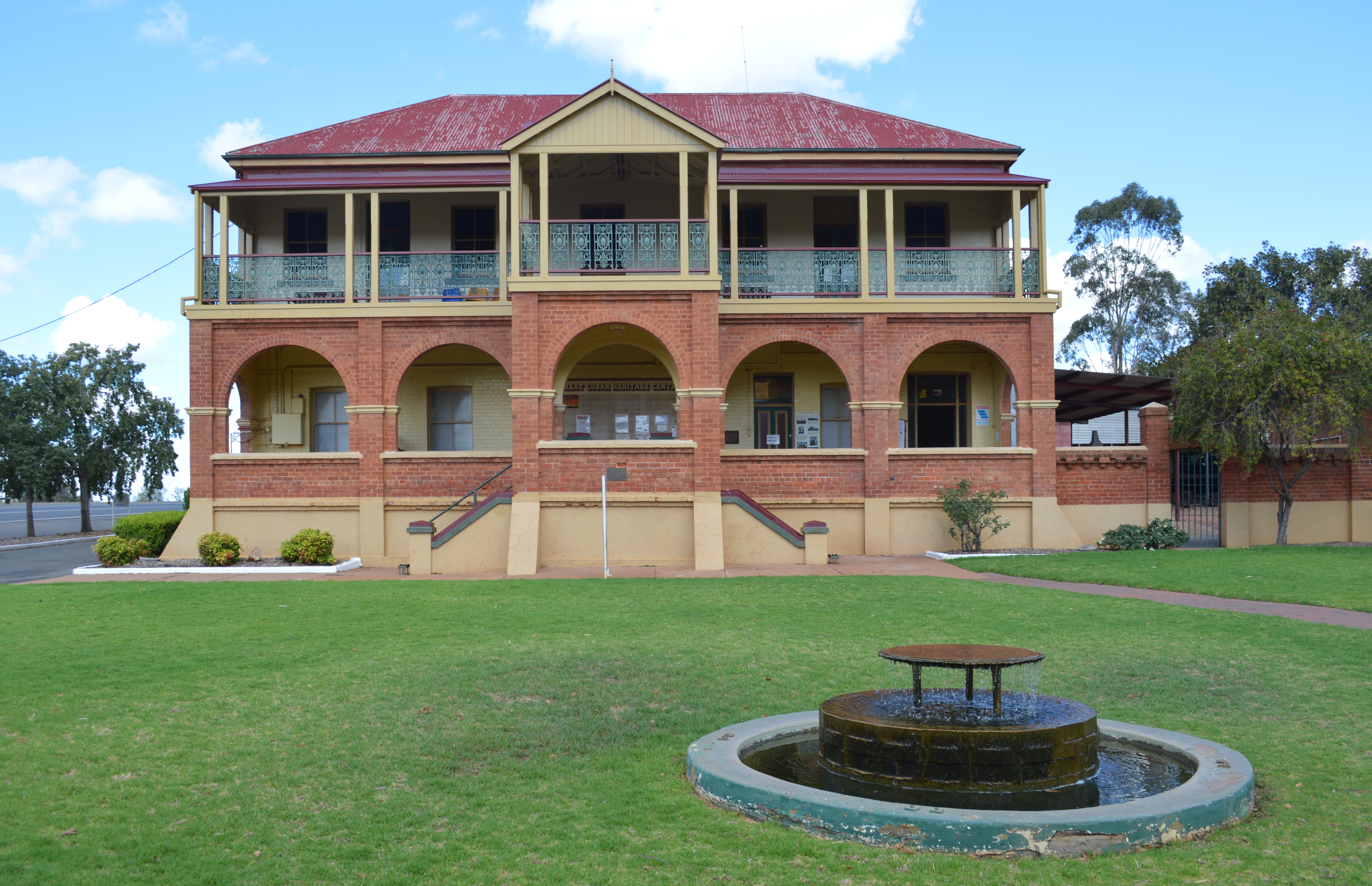
Great Cobar Museum & Cobar Visitors' Centre, the former administration offices.

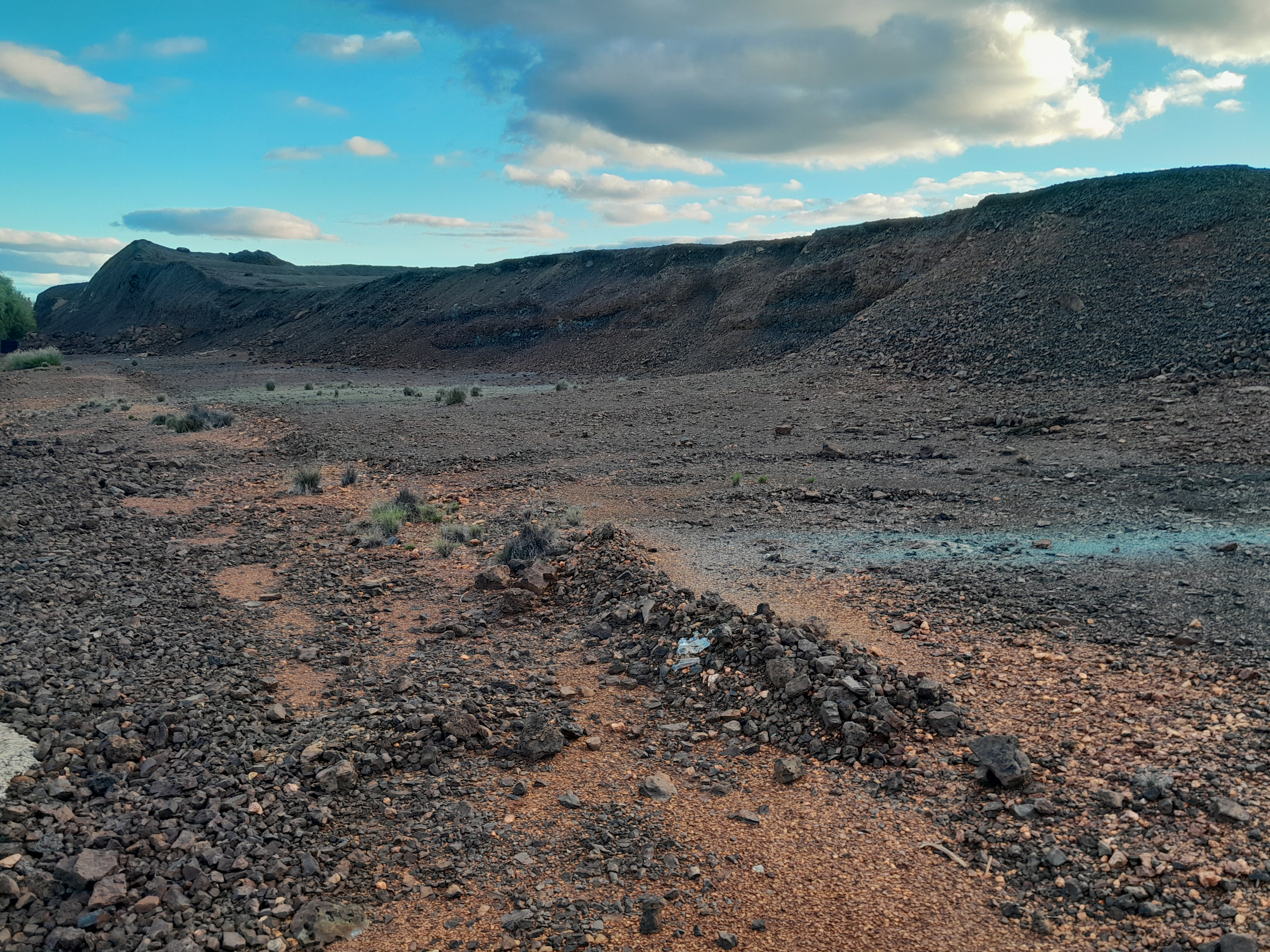
Part of the vast slag dump, viewed from Kidman Way (Aug 2024)

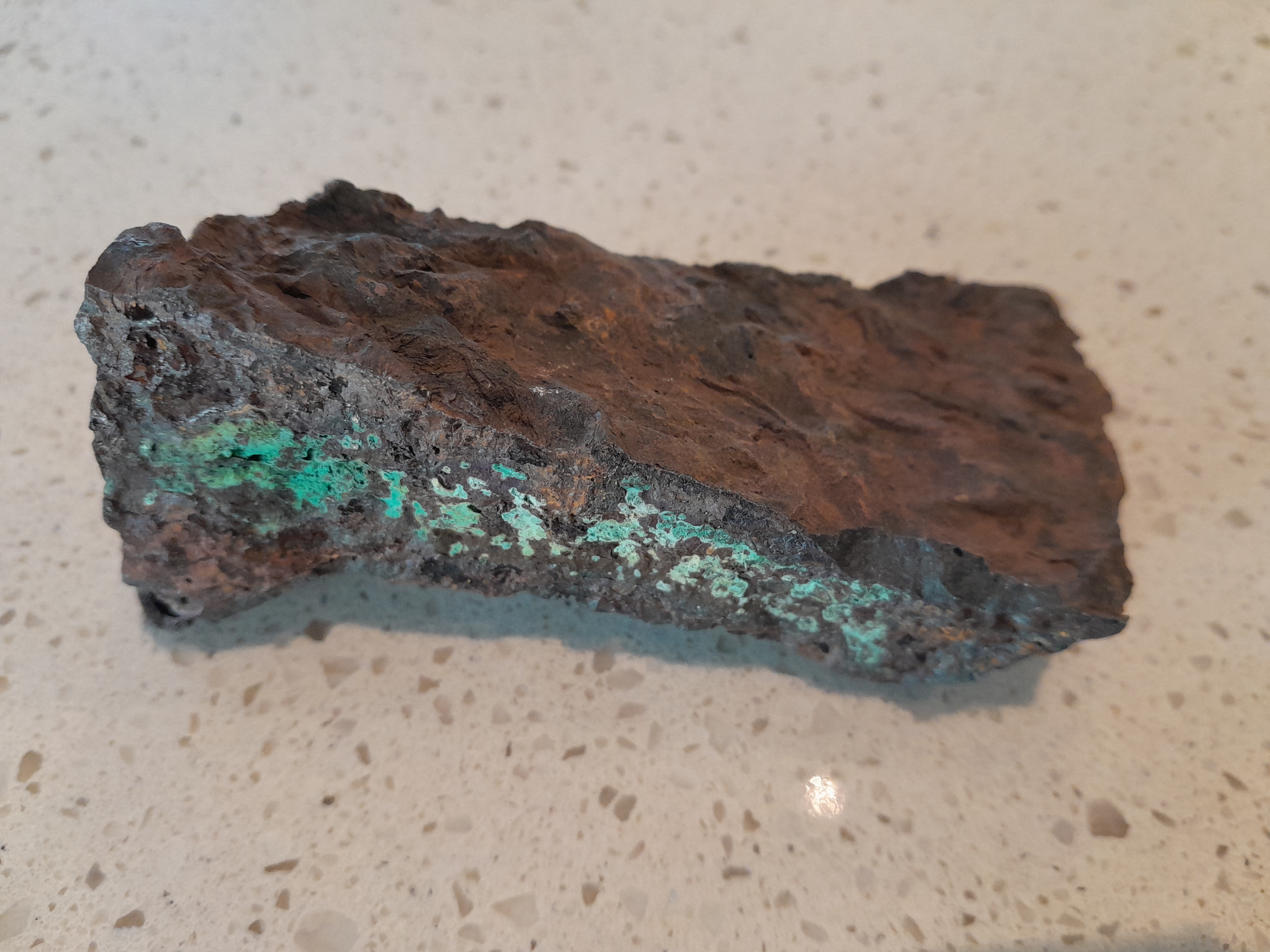
Slag specimen from the Great Cobar mine, with colouration due to the presence of copper.

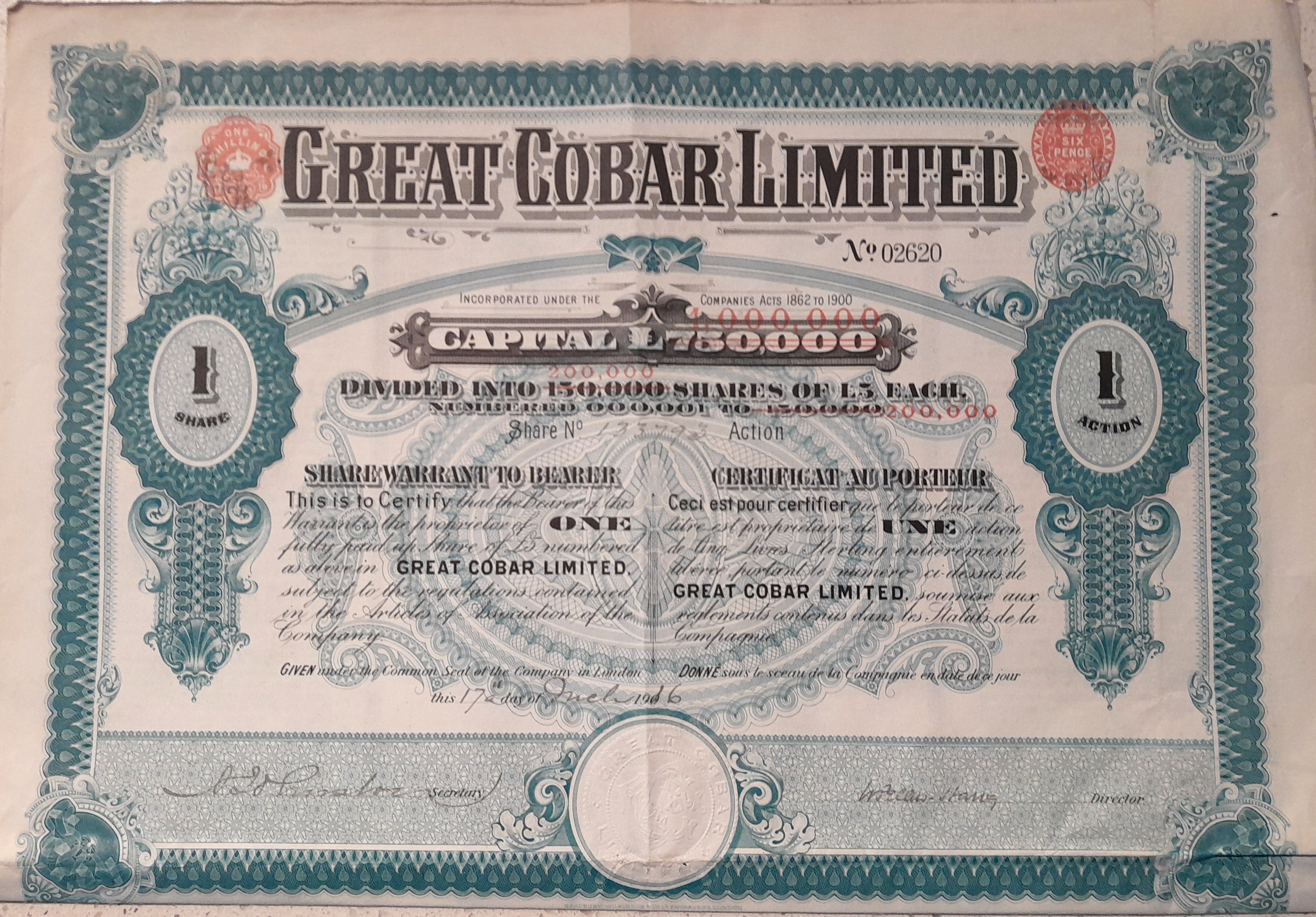
Great Cobar Ltd share warrant. This one was issued after additional capital was authorised in late 1910 (note the red-coloured overprinting).

== Recent mining activity ==
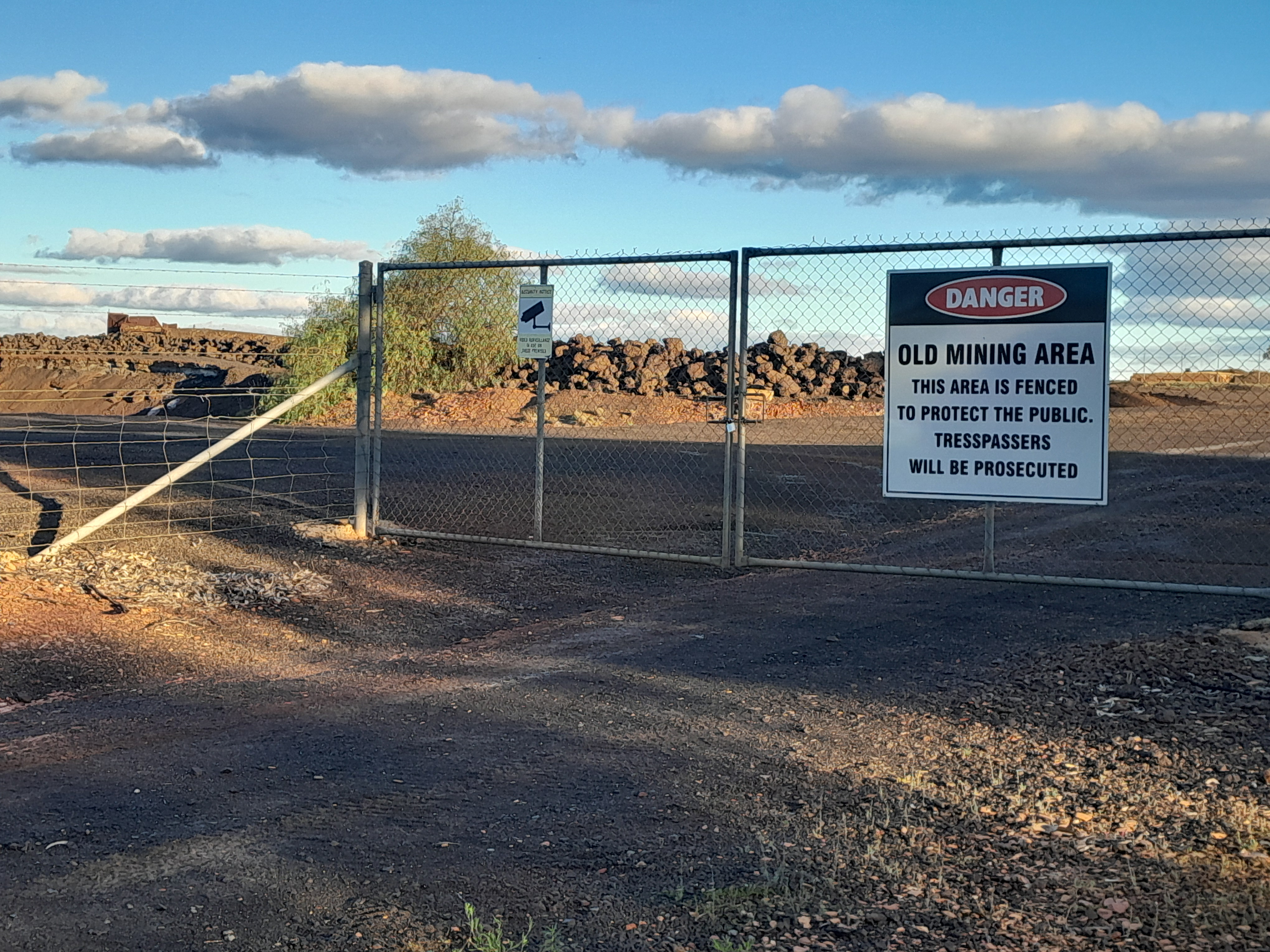
Fence, gate, and signage (Aug 2024)

The Great Cobar mine itself never reopened, but in 2022, planning permission was granted to once again mine within its boundaries.

A deposit of copper-silver-gold ore has been identified, at a depth of around 1000 m, which is more than double the depth of the deepest of the old Great Cobar mine workings. The new resource was estimated, in 2024. to contain 47,000 tonnes of copper and 61,000 ounces of gold, with an estimated mining life of four to five years. By mid 2026, the estimate resource had grown to 77,000 tonnes of copper, 84,000 ounces of gold and 505,000 ounces of silver, with an expected mine life of eight years.

Development work on the Great Cobar deposit began on 1 July 2025. The new mine workings will be accessed by declines, leaving the old Great Cobar mine site safely cordoned off and undisturbed.
