= Eliza Hall =

Australian philanthropist (1847–1916)

Eliza Rowdon Hall
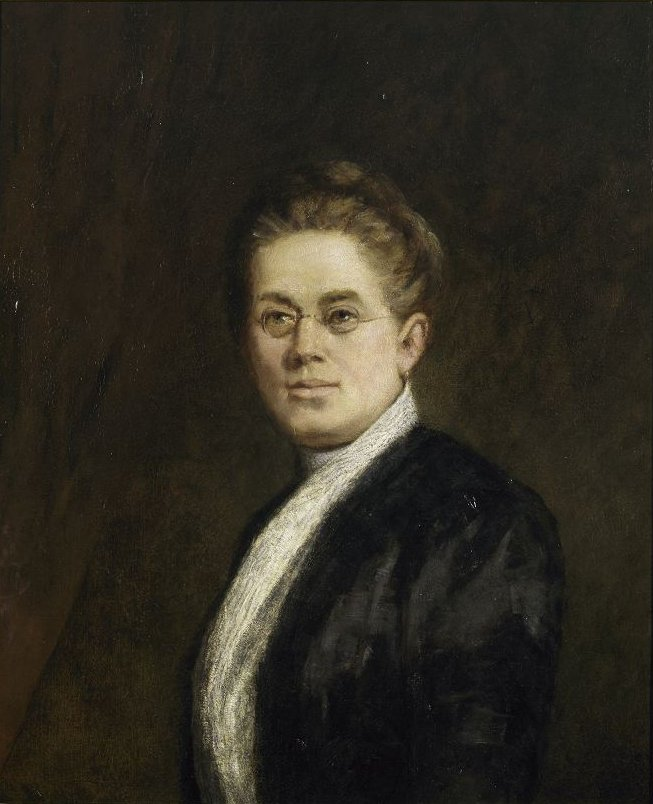
- Portrait of Hall by Frederick McCubbin, c. 1913
- Born: Eliza Rowdon Kirk; 26 November 1847; Melbourne, Colony of New South Wales
- Died: 14 February 1916 (aged 68); Potts Point, Sydney, New South Wales, Australia
- Resting place: Melbourne General Cemetery.
- Monuments: St Paul's Cathedral
- Occupation: Philanthropist
- Known for: Founding The Walter and Eliza Hall Trust
- Spouse: Walter Russell Hall (m. 1874; died 1911)

Eliza Rowdon Hall (née Kirk; 26 November 1847 – 14 February 1916) was an Australian philanthropist, known for establishing The Walter and Eliza Hall Trust.

== Early life and family ==
Hall was born Eliza Rowdon Kirk on 26 November 1847 in Melbourne, Colony of New South Wales (present-day Victoria, Australia) to English parents George Kirk, a Yorkshire-born butcher, pastoralist and parliamentarian, and Elizabeth Kirk (née Wippell), who was from Devon. On 15 April 1874, Kirk married the Sydney businessman and philanthropist Walter Russell Hall at St Paul's Cathedral, Melbourne. The couple had no children, but cared for two orphaned cousins.

== Career ==
Her husband donated to charitable causes in Sydney and Mount Morgan, where he had amassed great wealth from the town's mine. During their marriage, Hall developed an interest in charities which provided for women and children.

Following her husband's death in 1911, Hall inherited a sizable estate from which she established "The Walter and Eliza Hall Trust" the following year. Hall's endowment of million pounds, was at the time the largest benefaction in Australian history. In collaboration with Richard Casey and Harry Brookes Allen, the Trust helped establish the Walter and Eliza Hall Institute of Research in Pathology and Medicine (present-day, WEHI) in 1915.

== Death and legacy ==
On 14 February 1916, Hall died from cancer at her home in Potts Point, Sydney. Hall was buried at Melbourne General Cemetery. A memorial plaque in Hall's and her husband's memory was erected at St Paul's Cathedral, Melbourne.

The philanthropist Vera Ramaciotti was later inspired by Hall to establish, alongside her brother Clive, the Clive and Vera Ramaciotti Foundation.
