= Claude Vautin =

Australian extractive metallurgist and chemist

Claude Theodore James Vautin (1855–1939) was a metallurgist and chemist. He developed, jointly with James Cosmo Newbery, the Newbery-Vautin chlorination process of extracting gold from pyrite ores, and held numerous other patents. Sometimes described as British, he was Australian-born and spent the first part of his career in Australia, and some years in South Africa, but subsequently lived in England. His career was marred by his conviction, in April 1899, of intent to defraud and obtaining money by false pretences.

== Career ==
=== Australia ===
==== Early career ====
Vautin was active on the Hodgekinson goldfield, buying a share of a claim near Thornborough, Queensland, in 1877. He was a business associate of W.A. 'Jim' Parker; both men were assayers at Thornborough at the time. Years later, in April 1899, an anonymous columnist of The Bulletin, recalled that Vautin, while on the North Queensland goldfields, "was a handsome young fellow, the idol of the women and the envy of the men".

==== Great Cobar mine ====
Vautin was doing work for the Great Cobar mine, around 1881. His name appeared—jointly with his assignees, Great Cobar's managing director, Russell Barton, and its mine manager, George Hardie—on a patent application, for "Improvements in the refining of impure commercial copper". This was but one of a number of parents that he would hold.

Vautin successfully demonstrated continuous copper ore smelting, using a water jacket furnace and converter, to the Great Cobar Copper-Mining Company, in 1884. Sulphide ores did not need prior roasting, when smelted in a water jacket furnace. Vautin was one of the first who experimented with applying Bessemer converter technology to converting copper matte—the product of a water jacket furnace—to crude ('blister copper') metal.

Water jacket furnaces needed coke. With the closest railway being at Nyngan, the road freight cost of moving coke from there to Cobar, made water jacket furnaces uneconomic, at that time. After a railway to Cobar was opened in 1892, the Great Cobar Mining Syndicate, used water jacket furnaces at the mine; by 1898 five such furnaces were operating with great success. Converters were only introduced, around 1908, during the time that the mine was owned and operated by Great Cobar Limited.

==== Chlorination process ====
A process for extracting gold from gold ores containing pyrite using chlorine gas was introduced by Karl Friedrich Plattner, around 1848. James Newbery and Claude Vautin began work on chlorination, at the United Pyrites Gold Extracting Co. in Bendigo, in 1878. They were awarded Victorian Patent No. 4484, in 1886, for their Newbery-Vautin chlorination process, which was faster than earlier chlorination processes.

==== Mount Morgan ====
One of the earliest users of the patented chlorination process was the huge Mount Morgan mine, in Queensland. A Newbery-Vautin chlorination plant was working there by late 1886. However, it seems that the plant was later modified by the mine, to resolve problems with equipment, and its final form differed in some significant respects from the plant originally installed. The mine called the resulting arrangement the Hall-Richard process, after J. (James) Wesley Hall (managing director, and brother of Walter Russell Hall) and G.A. Richard (assayer, and later general manager). Richard developed considerable expertise in optimizing chlorination. Worse for Newbery and Vautin, Richard was able to patent his process, and it also was used at other mines. Mount Morgan continued to use chlorination, until at least 1912, well after most other mines ceased using it.

=== England and South Africa ===
==== Move to London ====
In 1887, Vautin moved from Melbourne to London. In June 1887, Vautin appeared, in a case at Mansion House in London, as a witness against the directions of a company Mount Morgan (West) Gold Mines, who were accused of "publishing a prospectus knowing the same to be false in certain material particulars, with intent to induce persons to become shareholders in the company".

==== Commercialisation of the chlorination process ====
The Newbery-Vautin chlorination process was used at gold mines in Australia, but also overseas, including at Thames in New Zealand, Denver in Colorado, Vancouver in Canada, at Johannesburg and Barberton in South Africa, and at the Morro Velho mine in Brazil.

A company, Newbery-Vautin Gold Extraction Company ('the Newbery-Vautin Company') was set up in London, in late 1887, to market the chlorination process globally. All its shares were privately subscribed. Vautin became managing director, with a salary of £1,000 per annum.

A prospectus had been issued in December 1887, to float a New Zealand company to exploit the patents there. The plant at Thames, erected in 1888, was a notable failure; expectations that the process—acknowledged to be well-proven—was well-suited to the ore were proven incorrect. A patent was also awarded in the Natal Colony.

A rival chlorination process, developed and patented by J. (James) Holms Pollok (1868–1915), was unsuccessfully challenged by Newbery and Vautin, and that process was used in large gold extraction plants at Ravenswood and elsewhere.

Newbery-Vautin Gold Extraction Company Limited, was already in liquidation by October 1888.

Gold extraction processes using cyanide became more commonly used, and eventually largely superseded chlorination. A US patent for the MacArthur-Forrest gold cyanidation process was issued in May 1889, by which time similar patents had been issued—during 1887 and 1888—in England, some colonies of the British Empire, and in some other countries. The patents covered the joint work of John Stewart MacArthur and two brothers, Robert and William Forrest. Their process was first used commercially, on the Rand, in 1890.

==== South Africa and first bankruptcy ====
Vautin spent the years 1888 to 1890 in South Africa. In 1889, Vautin and two others, Millbourne and Steers, were sued unsuccessfully, by the Sheba Gold Mining Company of Barberton, over an alluvial claim they took out over the mining company's abandoned tailings heaps.

Vautin was made bankrupt—with liabilities of £14,000 but assets of only £8,000—at Johannesburg, in 1890. The events, leading to his becoming bankrupt, related to the sale, by Vautin, of his interest in a mine, over which the Standard Bank held a mortgage as security for Vautin's debt to them.

==== Return to London ====
He then returned to London and set up practice as a metallurgist at 42 Old Broad Street, EC, in London. Without having been released from his South African bankruptcy, he once became prosperous.

By 1891, he had a laboratory, on City Road in London. Vautin was elected a fellow of the Chemical Society in 1893. In 1894, he appeared as a witness for the defence of a company accused of infringements upon patents covering aspects of the cyanide process. Also, 1894, he wrote and read a technical paper on his experimentation with the electrolysis of fused salts and attempts to produce sodium metal.

==== Thermite and reduction using powdered aluminium ====
Vautin and his assistant Hugh Kilpatrick Pickard, used powdered aluminium as a reducing agent to obtain palladium and other difficult to smelt metals, in the years 1894 and 1895. However, at that time, apparently, Vautin did not recognize the potential of reducing iron oxide in this manner, for the specific purpose of thermite welding. Vautin took out a patent in 1894, but crucially, his patent made no mention of applying the chemical process as a method of welding. One who did recognise that potential was Hans Goldschmidt (1861–1923), a German chemist. Goldschmidt is regarded as being the inventor of thermite, in 1893, and he obtained a Gernam patent in 1895. However, it is recorded that Vautin was working along similar lines from around 1892, and had published results before the end of 1894. Goldschmidt's patent also covered the reduction of other metallic compounds, using aluminium to produce metals such as chromium and manganese, without carbon. Moreover, Goldschmidt and Vautin were aware of each other's work, and Goldschmidt had visited Vautin's laboratory in City Road. In 1898, the two co-authored a paper, 'Aluminium as a heating and reducing agent', published in the Journal of the Society of Chemical Industry. The enterprise that Goldschmidt built upon his patent for thermite (trade name, Thermit) still operates, but Vautin was later not able to enforce—despite his earlier 1894 patent—his own variation of a thermite welding process, under a patent granted to him in 1905.

==== Cyanide patent ====
In 1895, Vautin became associated with a company, Gold Ore Treatment Company Ltd, commercially exploiting the joint work of H.L. Sulman and F.L. Teed, who were granted a patent on an enhancement to the cyanide process; it made a solution of potassium cyanide dissolve gold faster, by adding cynogen bromide. Some cast doubt on the originality of the concept, but the British patent—sometimes erroneously referred to as the 'Vautin-Sulman patent'—held. To complicate matters, in Australia, it was Vautin and Sulman, who attempted to patent the innovation, in Western Australia. Henry Livingstone Sulman (1861–1940) was a well-known English extractive metallurgist, now best remembered for his later important work on the flotation process.

=== Second bankruptcy and conviction ===
Reportedly, Vautin's net worth was around £10,000, by the end of 1896, when he began to engage in speculation on the London Stock Exchange, at first with success but later with losses. In November 1898, Claude Vautin was declared bankrupt in London, with estimated liabilities of £69,785.

Vautin was charged with defrauding stockbrokers, and a warrant for his arrest was issued. He was arrested in America, on 10 November 1898. At the time, he was a director of several gold mines in Western Australia. Put on trial at the Old Bailey, he gave a guilty plea "to having, within four months next before his bankruptcy, quitted England, taking with him the sum of £4,380, with intent to defraud his creditors" and "to obtaining £3,284 5s. by false pretences." Being of a previously good character, he was sentenced to six months' imprisonment, without hard labour, in April 1899.

=== Later career ===
Vautin's name reappears, in May 1905, relating to a demonstration by an American, Miss Lu Robinson, at the Pavilion, in Piccadilly Circus. It was described as 'melting iron in a top hat'. Miss Robinson stated that she was using a 'certain powder' invented by Claude Vautin. The description of the powder is very much like thermite. Thermite (trade name, 'Thermit') was first used to weld rails in Essen in 1899, and first used to weld rails in the United Kingdom in Leeds in 1904.

Vautin obtained a patent on 24 May 1905 (Letters Patent No. 10,881 of 1905) for "Improvements in the Production of Fused Metals and Alloys from Oxides and other Compounds." His patent involved exothermic reduction of iron oxide using a mixture of powdered aluminium and silicon, and was to be commercialised by a company known as Weldite Limited. Vautin agreed to the revoking of the patent, in December 1907, after being challenged by Thermit Ltd, who held the rights to Hans Goldschmidt's German Imperial patent No. 96317 of March 1895.

It seems that Vautin remained in England. He gave his address as 730 Salisbury House at London Wall, when his name appeared, in 1909, on an application for a Commonwealth (Australian) patent, for "Improvements in or relating to the utilisation of heat contained in slags".

Vautin died in the London Borough of Barnet, England.
