= Ramacciotti =

Ramacciotti is an Italian surname, with a direct etymological root from Latin ramus/rami (arm or branch and similar derivatives) in various regional dialects. Amongst other individuals, the surname may refer to:

- Francis Ramacciotti (1835-1894), inventor and a piano string manufacturer
- Giovanni Battista Ramacciotti (1628–1671), Italian painter
- Luis Ramacciotti (born 1886), Italian-Argentine sculptor
Surname variation
- Lorenzo Ramaciotti (born 1948), Italian car designer
- Gustave Ramaciotti (1861–1927), Australian law clerk, theatrical manager, and soldier
- Vera Ramaciotti (1891–1982), Australian philanthropist, sister of Clive Ramaciotti
- Clive Ramaciotti (1883–1967), Australian philanthropist, brother of Vera Ramaciotti
