= Fannie Eleanor Williams =

Australian bacteriologist and serologist

Fannie Eleanor Williams MBE ARRC
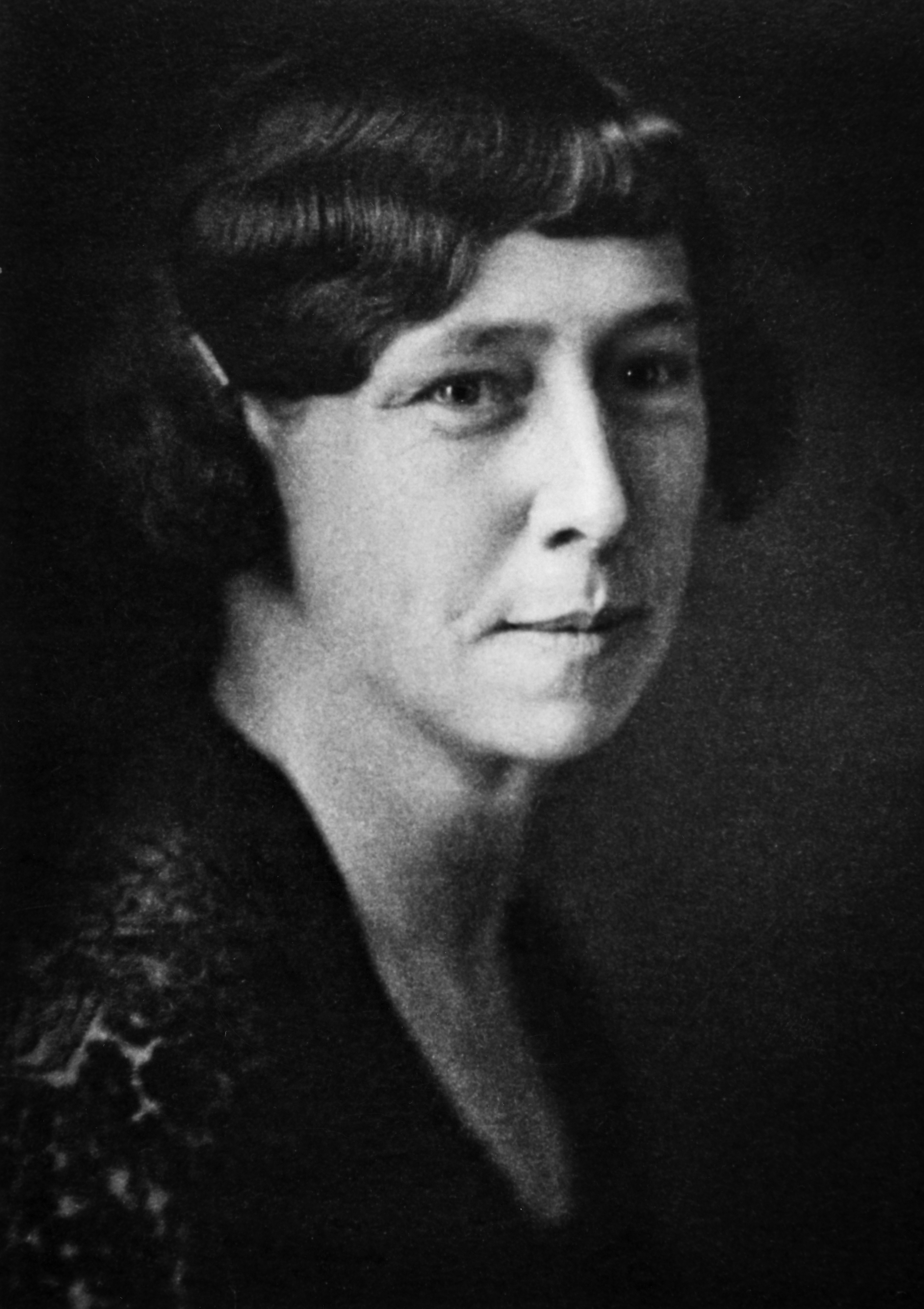
- Born: 4 July 1884; Adelaide, South Australia
- Died: 16 June 1963 (aged 78); Melbourne, Victoria
- Awards: Associate Royal Red Cross (1917)
- Scientific career
- Fields: Bacteriology; Serology
- Workplaces: Walter and Eliza Hall Institute of Medical Research

Fannie Eleanor Williams MBE, ARRC (4 July 1884 – 16 June 1963), known as Eleanor Williams, was an Australian scientist. She served as a bacteriologist during World War I, and was the third scientist and the first woman appointed to work at the Walter and Eliza Hall Institute of Medical Research after its establishment in 1915. She directed a laboratory studying infectious diseases, and had particular expertise in dysentery, hydatid disease and snake venom. She co-founded Australia's first blood bank.

== Early life and education ==
Fannie Eleanor Williams was born in Adelaide, South Australia on 4 July 1884. She was the second child and eldest daughter of James Williams and his wife Helen DuBois. Williams grew up in The Reedbeds, near Henley Beach, where her father was a farmer.

Williams trained as a nurse at the Adelaide Children's Hospital between 1904 and 1907. She was appointed sister in charge of the Thomas Elder Laboratory in 1907, and worked there for two years as an assistant to pathologist Dr. Thomas Borthwick. In December 1909, Williams took up a position as nurse inspector with the Unley Local Board of Health for which she undertook home visits and tested patients for diphtheria, measles, and other notifiable diseases.

In 1911, Williams returned to work with Dr. Borthwick as an attendant in a new pathology research laboratory at the Adelaide Hospital. She was the first woman in South Australia to hold such an appointment. She remained in this role until late 1914.

== Wartime service ==
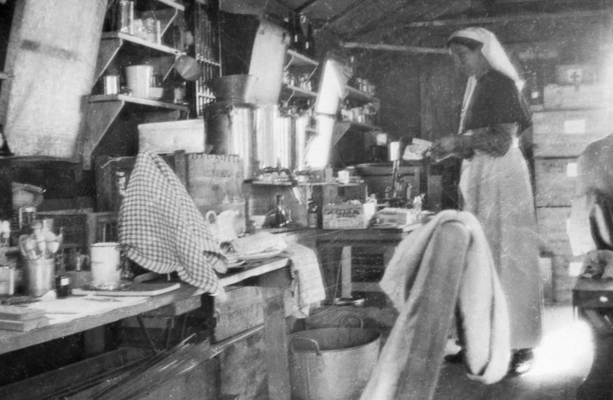
The laboratory at No 3 Australian General Hospital on Mudros Harbour. The nursing sister is Sister Fanny .E. Williams.

After the outbreak of World War I in 1914, Eleanor Williams was invited by Dr Trent Champion de Crespigny to join him on active service with the First Australian Imperial Force. Infectious disease was emerging as a significant issue for the campaign in Turkey and the Middle East, and the army wanted to recruit people with bacteriological and laboratory training to work on the problem. Accordingly, Williams enlisted with the Australian Army Nursing Service on 20 July 1915 and embarked for Egypt a fortnight later on the RMS Orontes. On arrival, Williams was posted to the 3rd Australian General Hospital on the island of Lemnos in Greece. This was one of the hospitals that received patients from the Gallipoli Campaign.

Williams' record at the Australian War Memorial states that she enlisted with the rank of Staff Nurse on 20 July 1915, and rose to the rank of Temporary Sister. She served in Egypt, Lemnos, England and France, was mentioned twice in despatches, and was awarded the Royal Red Cross (2nd Class).

Although Williams enlisted as a nurse, she worked exclusively in the laboratory as a bacteriologist, the only Australian woman to serve in such a capacity. Working alongside Dr Charles James Martin, Director of the Lister Institute, she performed ground-breaking work on dysentery, and quickly became known as an expert in this field. She continued to work with Martin throughout the war, on a variety of infectious diseases, including meningitis, streptococci, staphylococci, gas gangrene, and epidemic influenza.

== Scientific career ==
Following her repatriation in 1919, Eleanor Williams moved to Melbourne, and was appointed to the position of 'second assistant' at the newly-established Walter and Eliza Hall Institute of Medical Research by director Sydney Patterson. Williams had worked with Patterson on influenza during the war. She was the third staff member appointed to the Institute, and the first woman. She was also the only researcher with no medical or university qualification.

In the early 1920s, the Institute's focus was on respiratory and intestinal infections, and Williams worked on pneumonia, syphilis and dysentery, as well as the serological diagnosis of hydatid tapeworms. From 1923, she worked with Charles Kellaway on snake venom serology, and later worked on tuberculosis.

Williams occupied a position somewhere between that of research scientist, senior technician and general manager. While her lack of academic qualifications prevented her from lecturing at the University of Melbourne, she established and led the Institute's Diagnostic Microbiology Laboratory, and attended international and national conferences where she presented papers in her own right.

As the Institute grew in the late 1930s, Williams took on the responsibility for training and managing the Institute's research technicians. The training she provided was extremely thorough, and covered elements as diverse as animal care, the preparation of media and broths for bacterial culture, and glassblowing. She also trained junior scientists in practical bacteriology techniques. Among her trainees was Frank Macfarlane Burnet, who later described her as "the centre of commonsense and helpfulness around which all the activities of the Institute rotated".

During World War II, Williams coordinated the Institute's war efforts, providing administrative and practical support to the Emergency Blood Transfusion Service, as well as working in the laboratory.

She retired in 1957, and received an MBE for her work in the same year.

== Red Cross Blood Transfusion Service ==
Eleanor Williams was closely involved with The Red Cross Blood Transfusion Service (now the Australian Red Cross Blood Service) from its inception in 1929 by the Victorian Division of the Australian Red Cross Society. In the first decade of the service, laboratory tests were carried out at the Walter and Eliza Hall Institute of Medical Research, under the supervision of Williams and her colleague Dr Ian Wood.

The ability to deliver blood transfusions was limited by the lack of a blood bank, which would allow donated blood to be stored for future needs. In 1938, with World War II approaching, the decision was made to establish a blood bank at the Royal Melbourne Hospital, and Williams and Wood turned their attention to developing new techniques for storing blood and plasma, as well as to the logistical aspects of obtaining and administering the blood. The new Emergency Blood Transfusion Service was founded in May 1939 by Williams and Wood, with Williams managing the technical and administrative aspects of the service and Wood ensuring the supply of blood and serum in the field.

Once war was declared, Williams' team immediately began testing and recording the blood groups of all soldiers prior to embarkation, so that blood transfusions could more efficiently be performed in the field. In the first year of the war alone, her team, working as volunteers and in addition to their daily laboratory work, performed blood typing for 13,000 soldiers of the Second Australian Imperial Force. By the end of the war, Williams' team had performed blood typing for nearly 250,000 soldiers and numerous blood donors, all on a volunteer basis.

== Death and legacy ==
Eleanor Williams died on 16 June 1963, aged 78. She was cremated, and her ashes were scattered at the Springvale Botanical Cemetery. She was recognised with an obituary in The Medical Journal of Australia, written by Frank Macfarlane Burnet and Dr Ian Wood, which spoke of her 'remarkable knowledge, keen sense of humour, and tenacity of purpose'.

In 1964, as part of their Golden Jubilee celebrations, the Red Cross Blood Transfusion Service named their new laboratories the F. Eleanor Williams Serological Research Laboratories in her honour.
