= G. A. Richard =

Australian metallurgist

George Anderson Richard, probably born George Anderson Richards (20 November 1861 – 12 October 1943) was a mine engineer with Mount Morgan Mine, Queensland and general manager 1903–1912. He was almost invariably referred to as G. A. Richard, and from 1908 to his death customarily prefixed by "Captain".

== History ==
Richard was born in Tasmania, a son of mine manager Moses John Richards (died at George Town, Tasmania on 3 June 1910) and his wife Eliza Richards, née Sullivan (died at Beaconsfield on 20 August 1904).

Moses J. Richards, a temperance advocate, was a brother and prospecting partner of Samuel Richards, who discovered gold at Nine Mile Springs, acknowledged as the first payable reef in Tasmania, and shared his prize of £1,000. (In 1881 Nine Mile Springs was renamed Lefroy, for Sir Henry Lefroy, acting Governor.) While in Tasmania Moses lived successively at Lefroy, Beaconsfield, and finally George Town. He was mine manager for the Native Youth Mining Company at Lefroy, then the City of Launceston mine while his brother managed the Native Youth.

Richard was resident at Lefroy in 1882 when he owned a small parcel of shares in the Wanderer Gold Mining Company.

He studied at the Ballarat School of Mines, and worked for a time in an assay office at Charters Towers, where he made some improvements to the systems employed there.

He is said to have become an employee of the Mount Morgan Mine in 1884 in some minor capacity, and having gained the confidence of J. Wesley Hall (managing director and brother of Walter Russell Hall), was soon working in the assay office, and when Henry Trenear left, served in his place as head of that section. Wesley Hall retired in 1891, ushering in a new power elite, who attempted to interfere in technical matters, which Richard resisted strenuously. By 1894 he was making major changes in the ore treatment sheds, having greatly modified and simplified the gold extraction process, with demonstrable improvements in gold recovery and reduced costs.

In 1901 he was left £2,000 in Wesley Hall's will. Later that year he and G. P. Seale were sent by the company on a nine-month round-the-world tour of major gold producers.

Richard was appointed mine manager in 1903. after the death of Roger Lisle, and general manager a few months later. By this time the Mine had collected a technical staff of expertise rivalled by no other company in Australia, with the possible exception of BHP, with salaries to match. At a rumoured £3000 or more, Richard was reckoned to be the highest paid employee of any industrial company in Queensland.

The news of his resignation was released on 1 July 1912. One historian asserts that it was made under pressure from managing director R. S. Archer, under instructions from directors R. G. Casey and (Sir) Kelso King, who believed he could not resist workers' demands in the event of a strike. There had been reports of stormy meetings, and in truth he may not have been sorry to go. There had been two recent mine disasters, and major problems with the new copper extraction process.

In retirement he spent much time with his sons who were sheep-farming in the north-west of the State, did some munitions work during The Great War and campaigned for an improved railway system to alleviate the effects of drought on farmers. For much of his later life he lived at Norman Crescent, East Brisbane.

He died in Brisbane General Hospital and was cremated.

== Inventions ==
- With H. G. Neill, engineer at Mount Morgan Mine, patent for "A decanting process for separating gold, silver, and other metallic solutions from their ores"
- With J(ames) Wesley Hall, manager of Mount Morgan Mine, he developed an "Improvement in the extraction of gold by the agency of chloride". Although it was not the first chlorination process, it was seen as an improvement on the Newbery-Vautin process originally used at Mt Morgan.
- In 1897 Hall and Richard patented an improved steam shovel for filling and emptying ore processing vats.
- In 1898 he applied for a patent on an improved ore roasting or calcining furnace

== Other interests ==
- He was in 1888 hon. secretary of the building committee for the Mount Morgan School of Arts building
- He was in 1889 treasurer of the Mount Morgan Turf Club
- By 1890 he was a Captain of B Company, Mount Morgan, in the Queensland Defence Force
- In 1900 he was elected patron of the Mount Morgan Rifle Club
- He was a member of the Australasian Institute of Mining Engineers and its president in 1910.
- In 1910 he was elected to the Senate of Queensland University.

== Family ==
Richard married Ada Ellen Frances Neill (1870 – 20 September 1959), daughter of Mount Morgan's chief engineer, Hugh Green Neill, on 20 May 1891. His brother Frank married her sister, a noted beauty. Their children include:

- Gladys Richard ( – ) accompanied parents on extended holiday trip to Far East
- Ronald "Rold" Richard ( – ) named as Lieut. member of Expeditionary Force 1915
- Ken Richard ( – )

"... his sons are sheep farming in the north-west ..."

Other children of Moses Richards include:

- eldest daughter Catherine Elizabeth Richards (died c. 26 May 1943) was a teacher and talented pianist. She married son of the late Thomas John Knowles on 28 December 1887. She married again, to Albert William Guy.
- second son Samuel Jabez Richards MD (c. 1867 – 21 July 1915) married Jessie Russell Kidd of Launceston on 18 June 1886. He was at Mount Morgan 1903. He died on active duty, WWI
- third daughter Mary Ann Richards married Richard William Parry on 23 June 1889
- Frank Richard trained as a metallurgist, worked at Mount Morgan, later with Dinmore Pottery, Sydney. He married Edith Ellen Neill (1878– ), daughter of Mount Morgan's chief engineer, H. G. Neill.
