= Gordon Mathison =

Australian physician and soldier

Gordon Clunes Mackay Mathison
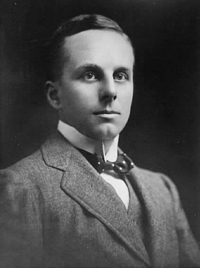
- Born: 10 August 1883; Stanley, Victoria, Australia
- Died: 18 May 1915 (aged 31); Alexandria, Egypt
- Cause of death: Killed in action (gunshot wound)
- Scientific career
- Fields: Respiratory physiology

Gordon Clunes Mackay Mathison FRCP (10 August 1883 – 18 May 1915) was a physician, medical researcher, and soldier.

Appointed the first director of the Walter and Eliza Hall Institute of Medical Research in Melbourne, Australia, he died on 18 May 1915, from wounds received in action on 10 May 1915 during the Gallipoli campaign, before he could take up the position.

== Family ==
The eldest of the three children of Hector Munro Mathison (1850-1895), a State School headmaster, and Mary Martha Mathison (1860-1942), née Barber, Gordon Clunes Mackay Mathison was born at Stanley, near Beechworth, Victoria on 10 August 1883. An older brother, also known as Gordon Clunes Mackay Mathison, had died on 13 January 1883, aged six months.

Soon after his birth, the family moved to Elsternwick, Victoria, where both his father and younger brother Robert Mackay (born 1894) died in 1895.

== Education ==
=== Primary ===
He attended Elsternwick State School, where his father and mother both taught, and his father was the headmaster.

=== Secondary ===
He attended Caulfield Grammar School from 1896 to 1900, where his scholarship and good character were later remembered.

=== Tertiary ===
As a member of Ormond College, Mathison studied medicine at the University of Melbourne, receiving many academic awards, from 1901 to 1905.

== Medical research ==
Mathison's research career began as a University of Melbourne Scholar studying physiology. In 1907 he travelled to England to take up an appointment as a Sharpey Scholar at University College London. He received a Beit Memorial Fellowship in 1910 to conduct research at University College Hospital, where he was awarded a DSc for his research into the physiology of respiration.

During this period he focused on the effects of asphyxia, and was commissioned by the Royal Society to investigate the causes of altitude sickness.

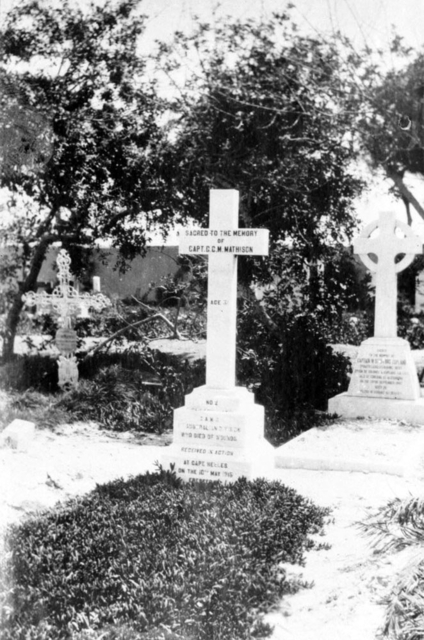
Memorial cross erected over the grave of Captain G.C.M. Mathieson

== Nominated Director of the Walter and Eliza Hall Institute of Medical Research ==
In September 1913 Mathison was appointed Sub-Director of Pathology and Sub-Dean of the Clinical School at the Melbourne Hospital; and, on 23 April 1915, he was nominated as the first director of the nascent Walter and Eliza Hall Institute of Medical Research, Australia's first pathological research institute.

He did not survive to take up the position.

== Military service ==
While in the United Kingdom, Mathison had been active in the University of London Officers’ Training Corps In August 1914, soon after the outbreak of the World War I, he enlisted in the 2nd Field Ambulance, Australian Army Medical Corps. He embarked with his unit on HMAT A18 Wiltshire from Melbourne to Egypt on 19 October 1914. Mathison was attached as a medical officer to the 5th Battalion of the Australian Imperial Force at the time of the Battle of Gallipoli.

== Death ==
On 10 May 1915 while resting outside of the aid station where he had been operating, Mathison was wounded by a stray bullet at Cape Helles. He was evacuated to Deaconesses Hospital, Alexandria, Egypt, where he died of his wounds on 18 May 1915, and was buried in the War Memorial Cemetery, at Chatby, near Alexandria. The Imperial War Graves Commission headstone erected over Mathison's grave bears the inscription: HE BEING MADE PERFECT IN A SHORT TIME FULFILLED A LONG TIME.

== Legacy ==
Memorial Tablet

This cross has been erected and a triennial
lectureship founded by the friends of Gordon
Clunes McKay Mathison, M.D., B.Sc., first director
of the clinical laboratory now included in this
institute, who died of wounds received at Gallipoli
18th May, 1915, aged 31 years
"Being made perfect in a short time,
he fulfilled a long time."

The University of Melbourne established a triennial lecture on medical research in Mathison's honour using an endowment from friends of Mathison; and, on Friday, 18 May 1917, a memorial tablet was unveiled at the Melbourne Hospital. Those present at the unveiling included Mathison's mother, personal friends of Mathison, Sir Harry Allen, the dean of the faculty of medicine at the University of Melbourne, Sir John Grice, chairman of the Melbourne Hospital committee, Dr. MacFarland, the vice-chancellor of the University of Melbourne, members of the University council, members of the medical profession, and members of the Melbourne Hospital committee. Testimony to his attainments, character. and scholarship ("his death was referred to as a national calamity") were given by Sir Harry Allen, Captain Philip Beauchamp Sewell, AAMC, who would also be killed in action not long after, and Sir John Grice. Sir Harry Allen unveiled the memorial tablet (for the text of the tablet, see box at right).

A bequest from Mary Mathison in memory of her son was used to establish the Gordon Clunes Mathison Research Scholarship at the Walter and Eliza Hall Institute of Medical Research

His name is located at panel 183 in the Commemorative Area at the Australian War Memorial.

== See also ==
- List of Caulfield Grammar School people
