= Lampadius =

Lampadius is a German surname. Notable people with the surname include:

- Jakob Lampadius (1593–1649), German expert in constitutional law, politician and diplomat
- Johann Lampadius (1569–1621), German Protestant Theologian and Professor of theology and history
- Stefan Lampadius (born 1976), German actor and filmmaker
- Wilhelm August Lampadius (1772–1842), German metallurgist, chemist and agronomist
