= Charles Butters =

American metallurgist & engineer

- Born: August 10, 1854; Haverhill, Massachusetts, U.S.
- Died: November 27, 1933 (aged 79); Berkeley, California, U.S.
- Spouse: Jessie Butters
- Engineering career
- Discipline: Mining engineering, metallurgy
- Significant design: Butters and Meins' Mechanical Distributor
- Significant advance: Use of gold cyanidation in Witwatersrand

Charles Butters (August 10, 1854 – November 27, 1933) was an American metallurgist, engineer and mine owner. A graduate of the University of California, Berkeley he moved to Southern Africa in 1890 to construct a chlorination plant for Hermann Eckstein & Company. Whilst there Butters pioneered the use of the gold cyanidation process for extracting the metal from low grade ore, which opened up new deposits in Witwatersrand. He also developed other methods that increased extraction efficiency. Butters left Eckstein in 1894 to jointly found a new firm, the Rand Central Ore Reduction Company. He joined the Johannesburg Reform Committee in 1895, a group of mostly immigrants to South Africa who demanded, among other things, a stable constitution, an independent judiciary, and a better educational system; he participated in the Jameson Raid, a botched attempt against the South African Republic, and was fined $2,000.

Butters returned to the United States in 1898 where he ran his own company, Chas. Butters & Co Ltd. By 1907 he had amassed a significant fortune from his mining operations. Butters proposed that his mines in Mexico be permitted to mint their own coinage, which would reduce the supply of silver bullion and increase the sale price. Butters risked execution by firing squad by taking steps to protect his mines in Nicaragua during the 1926–27 civil war.

== Early life and career ==
Charles Butters was born in Haverhill, Massachusetts, on August 10, 1854. After graduating from University of California, Berkeley he worked as a metallurgist in mines in the Western United States.

== Southern Africa ==
Butters traveled to the Transvaal in 1890 to construct a chlorination plant to treat ore at the Robinson Gold Mine for Hermann Eckstein & Company. Whilst in southern Africa he pioneered the use of the gold cyanidation process for extracting gold from low grade ore. This revolutionised gold mining in Witwatersrand as it was much more efficient than the vanning and shaking table methods and allowed the exploitation of many deposits previously ruled out as being too low in yield. Butters also developed the Butters and Meins' Mechanical Distributor which removed slime from sand tailings to allow them to be treated by cyanide process, further improving efficiencies. By 1894 Butters was experimenting with the treatment of the slime with lime and in settlement tanks to allow residual gold to be extracted. Butters left Hermann Eckstein & Company in 1894 to become a founder of the Rand Central Ore Reduction Company. He joined the Johannesburg Reform Committee in 1895 and at the end of that year took part in the Jameson Raid. After the raid he was arrested, sentenced as an accomplice and fined $2,000.

== Return to United States ==
Butters returned to the United States in 1898 and ran his own firm Chas. Butters & Co Ltd. He was described as having "gained a magnificent fortune" by 1907 by which point one of his gold mines his company purchased for $40,000 cash had generated $3 million in dividends, with a further $3 million of ore identified in the mine. Butters owned a large estate in Rockridge, Oakland, California, and, in 1911, opposed the extension of the Oakland, Antioch and Eastern Railroad, which passed by his estate and he considered to be a nuisance.

In 1920 Butters proposed establishing mints in Mexico to produce silver coinage which would be used to pay taxes to the Mexican government and the salaries of mine employees. This scheme, which came to be known as the Butters Plan, would reduce the supply of silver bullion, causing an increase in price, and allow mines to purchase goods with coin for export. The bullion had previously been transported to India and China where it was sold at a fixed price under the Pittman Act. Butters considered the previous arrangement served to the benefit of the British government, who controlled the eastern silver trade, at the expense of his mines. In 1927 Butters risked a firing squad when he took steps to protect his mines in Nicaragua during the civil war.

Butters was an associate member of the Institution of Civil Engineers and, in 1931, received a medal from the Mining and Metallurgical Society of Freiburg, Germany for his research work. Butters was married to Jessie Butters and died in Berkeley, California, on November 27, 1933. His papers are held in the archive of the University of California, Berkeley Libraries.
