= Chlorination =

Chlorination may refer to:

- Chlorination reaction, a halogenation reaction using chlorine
- Water chlorination, a method of water treatment
- Metallurgical processes formerly used to recover gold from pyrite ores using chlorine, such as the Newbery-Vautin chlorination process
