= Christlieb Ehregott Gellert =

German chemist and metallurgist

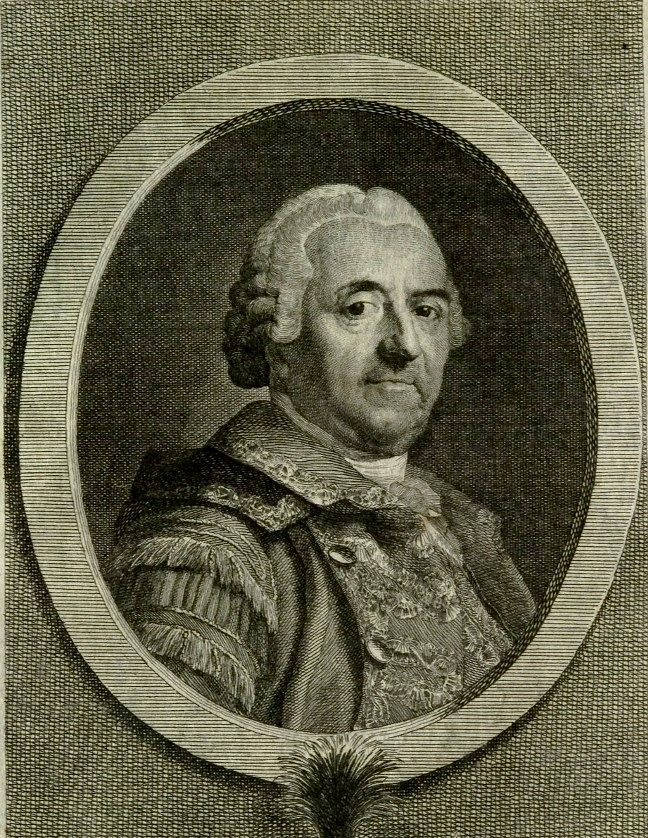

Christlieb Ehregott Gellert (August 11, 1713 – May 18, 1795) was a German chemist and metallurgist. He was the first professor of chemical metallurgy at the Freiberg Mining Academy.

== Life and work ==
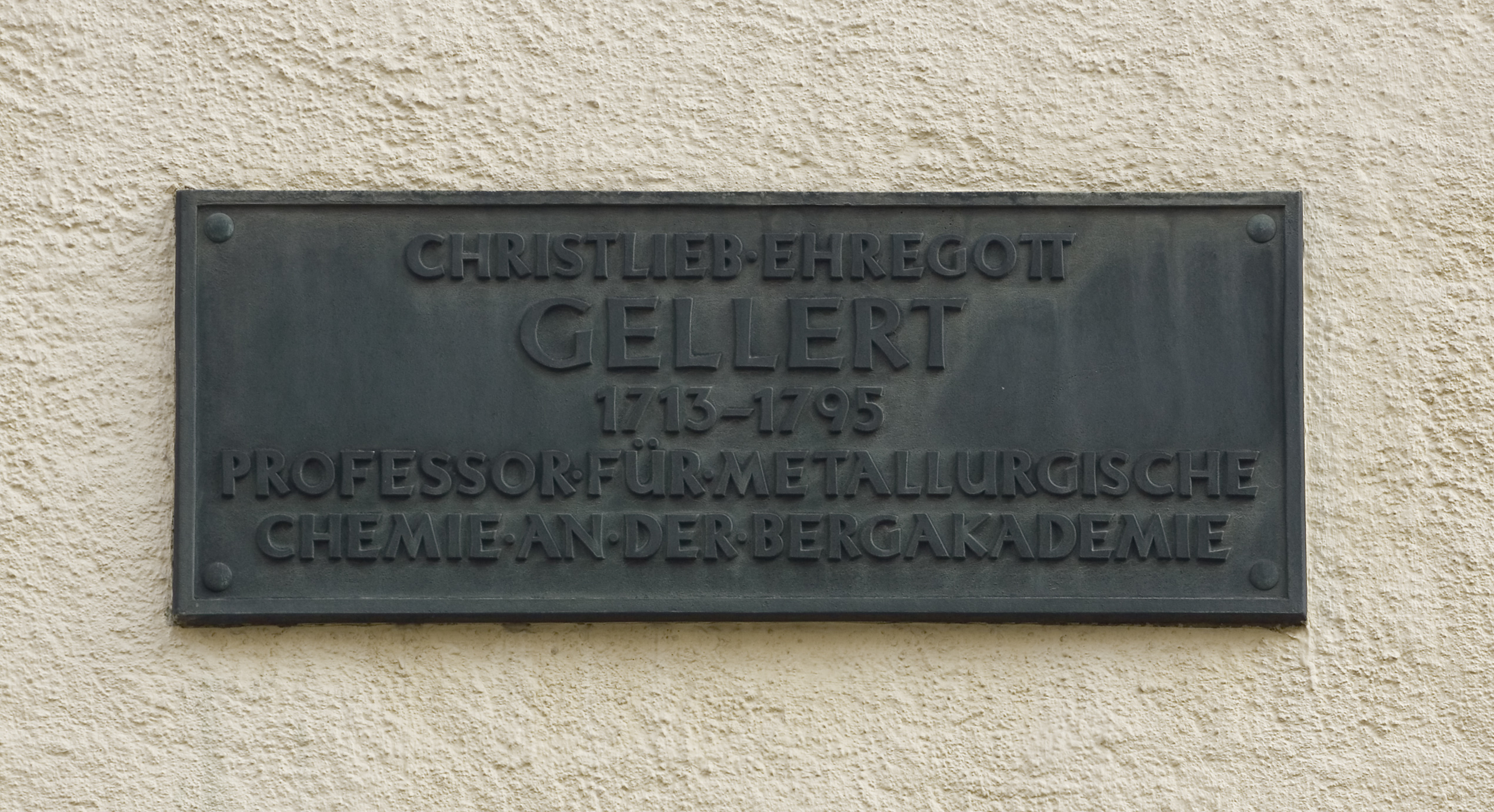
Memorial plaque outside Gellert's home in Freiberg

Gellert was born in Hainichen near Freiberg (Saxony), the son of church priest Christian (1672–1747) and Johanna Salome (1680–1759) née Schütz. He studied in Freiberg before going to the princely school of St. Afra in Meissen in 1729. His brother was the poet Christian Fürchtegott Gellert. He studied natural sciences at the University of Leipzig from 1734 to 1736 and then went to St Peterburg to teach at a grammar school. He worked as an adjunct at the Imperial Academy of Sciences where Leonhard Euler inspired him to study chemistry and physics. In 1746 he published a translation of J. A. Cramer's Elementa artis docimasticae (1739). He moved back to Freiberg and began to work on practical mining and metallurgy. He worked with the Freiberg ironworks to improve machinery and furnaces. He followed the phlogiston theory and used it to explain oxidation and reduction in metallurgy. He succeeded Johann Friedrich Henckel and founded a private chemical school and taught many students, he established tables of the specific gravity of various minerals and wrote a textbook on metallurgical chemistry in 1750. He demonstrated that the melting points of mixtures was lower than that of the pure components. In 1753, he was appointed to the Oberberg mining authority in Freberg and in 1762 he became chief smelting administrator. In 1766 he became a professor of metallurgy in the Freiberg Mining Academy. He became a mining councillor in 1782. He introduced amalgam extraction of metals from sulfide ores based on methods developed in Schemnitz and Joachimsthal. He oversaw a large scale facility in Halsbrücke in 1792 which extracted silver from silver pyrite. He was succeeded by Wilhelm Lampadius (1772–1842) who separated the teaching of chemistry and metallurgy at the Mining Academy. A building in the Freiberg Mining and Technology University is named after him.
