= Charles Kellaway =

Australian medical researcher (1889–1952)

Charles Halliley Kellaway
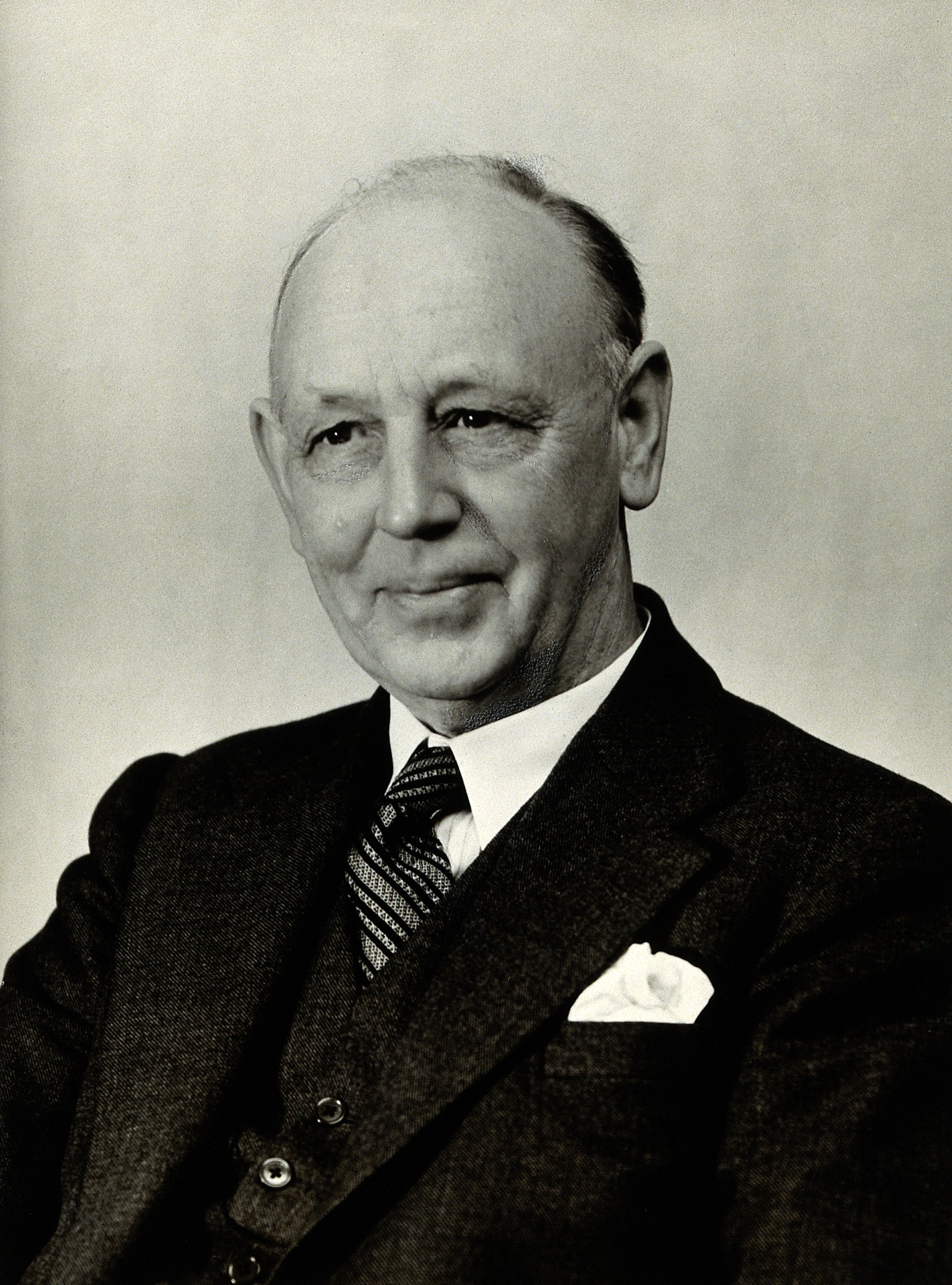
- Born: 16 January 1889; Melbourne, Australia
- Died: 13 December 1952 (aged 63); London, England
- Education: Melbourne Grammar; University of Melbourne
- Awards: Burfitt Prize and Medal of the Royal Society of New South Wales (1932); Fellow of the Royal Society of London (1940); Vice President, Royal Australasian College of Physicians (1942–44)
- Scientific career
- Fields: Physiology, pharmacology, snake venoms
- Workplaces: Melbourne Hospital; University College Hospital; Walter and Eliza Hall Institute of Medical Research; Wellcome Research Laboratories (GlaxoSmithKline)

Charles Halliley Kellaway, MC, FRS (16 January 1889 – 13 December 1952) was an Australian medical researcher and science administrator.

== Biography ==
=== Early years and education ===
Charles Kellaway was born at the parsonage attached to St James's Old Cathedral, Melbourne. His father was an evangelical Anglican minister, and many of Kellaway's siblings were instilled with religious zeal. Kellaway himself was determined to become a medical missionary in Egypt, but lost his faith during the tragedies of World War I. He was educated at home until aged 11, attended Caulfield Grammar School in 1900 and, after receiving a scholarship, went on to complete his secondary education at Melbourne Church of England Grammar School, 1901–06. Following school he went to the University of Melbourne in 1907 to study medicine, although he had to turn down the residential Clarke scholarship at Trinity College owing to the family's limited finances. Working through a difficult period in the medical school's curriculum, Kellaway nevertheless completed his MB and BS in 1911, his MD in 1913, and his MS in 1915. On graduating, he was lauded as the most brilliant student ever to have completed a medical degree at the university.

=== World War I service and research training in Britain ===
Upon concluding his formal studies in 1914, Kellaway held the acting professorship in anatomy at the University of Adelaide during 1915. He enlisted that November, serving as a captain in Egypt in 1916 with the Australian Army Medical Corps. Kellaway was fortunate that his first posting saw him working with Charles Martin, the director of London's Lister Institute, who encouraged Kellaway's scientific ambitions. After working as a regimental medical officer in Flanders during 1917, Kellaway was awarded a Military Cross for fortitude under fire, and in 1918 was promoted to major. During 1918–19 he was attached to the Australian Flying Corps medical boards in London, concurrently initiating research into problems related to anoxia under Henry Dale. Dale was doubtless Kellaway's lifelong scientific mentor and patron, and he is likely to have encouraged Kellaway to apply for the Royal Society's inaugural Foulerton Studentship in 1919. This Kellaway did after his repatriation to Australia, spending the second half of 1919 as acting professor of physiology at Adelaide University. Winning the Foulerton Studentship allowed Kellaway to return to Britain, spending the years 1920–23 working with Dale at the National Institute for Medical Research, with Charles Sherrington at Oxford University, and with Thomas Elliott at the University College Hospital in London. These years were critical both in forming Kellaway's scientific direction and his conceptions as to how medical research ought to be configured in Australia. Kellaway moved back to Melbourne in August 1923 when invited to become the second director of the Walter and Eliza Hall Institute of Research in Pathology and Medicine (now the Walter and Eliza Hall Institute of Medical Research).

=== Directorship of the Walter and Eliza Hall Institute ===
During his first years at the Hall Institute, Kellaway concentrated on organisational and financial aspects. These included securing an increased stipend from the Walter and Eliza Hall Trust, additional income from Melbourne University, and – most importantly – permission to seek benefactions beyond these bodies. Kellaway's networking amongst doctors, medical industrialists and the wider business community led to several significant gifts which allowed, amongst other things, the establishment of a library and a new biochemistry department. This accorded with his reorganisation of the scientific activities of the institute from a series of sundry pathology services into three discrete research streams: biochemistry (under Cambridge-trained Henry Holden), bacteriology (under the recent Australian graduate, Frank Macfarlane Burnet) and physiology (Kellaway). His own work ranged across various fields during the mid-twenties, including kidney disease and hydatid infection (echinococcosis).

An important contribution to public perceptions of medical research occurred in early 1928, when Kellaway was invited by the Minister of Health to form a Royal Commission of inquiry into the Bundaberg tragedy, in which 12 children died following inoculation with diphtheria toxin-antitoxin. The rigour of this inquiry was lauded by the medical profession and public alike, both vindicating the Commonwealth's diphtheria immunisation programme and drawing international attention to Kellaway's thoroughgoing scientific investigation.

=== Scientific research into Australian snake venoms ===
Although his early studies garnered a degree of acclaim, it was in late 1927 that Kellaway found his experimental forte. At the suggestion of Neil Hamilton Fairley – then resident at the Hall Institute whilst recuperating from tropical sprue – a significant research programme was instigated into Australian snake venoms. This practical and scientific problem had not been substantively addressed since the turn of the century researches by Frank Tidswell and Charles Martin. Kellaway also used the opportunity to negotiate with the Minister for Health one of the first ad-hoc grants for medical research in Australia, preceded only by a limited number of cancer investigations. This grant lasted from 1928 to 1931 and was a milestone in Commonwealth support for independent research in medical science. Working with Fairley, Holden and Fannie Eleanor Williams from the institute, plus Frederick Morgan from the Commonwealth Serum Laboratories (now CSL Limited) and Tom 'Pambo' Eades from the Melbourne Zoo, Kellway's research encompassed venoms from a plethora of Australian snake species (elapidae). This work initially focused on characterising biting apparatus, venom yields, pharmacological activity, lethality and immunology. Clinical work included investigations into the appropriate first-aid treatment of snakebite and the development of antivenenes (antivenoms) against tiger snake (Notechis scutatus), copperhead (Austrelaps superbus) and death adder (Acanthophis antarcticus) venoms, although only the first was found suitable for manufacture by CSL. In addition to expanding field work on identification and characterisation of a wide range of Australian elapids and their venoms, Kellaway's work through the 1930s broadened to include platypus, mussel, Sydney funnel-web spider (Atrax robustus) and redback spider (Latrodectus hasselti) venoms. This huge corpus of work, totalling over 70 publications by the end of the programme, resulted in an invitation for Kellaway to review his oeuvre via the prestigious Charles E Dohme Memorial Lectureships at Johns Hopkins University Medical School (now Johns Hopkins School of Medicine) in 1936 – an impressive international accolade.

The Dohme lectures also coincided with a shift in Kellaway's interest towards tissue injury by venoms, particularly their effects on haemodynamics. His investigations thus returned to the study of histamine and anaphylaxis that had characterised his early 1920s work with Dale, while Kellaway was furthermore encouraged by the two-year tenure of expatriate German pharmacologist, Wilhelm Feldberg, at the Hall Institute (1936–38). During this period, working also with his compatriots Hugh LeMessurier and Everton Trethewie, Kellaway's programme evolved into a study of the release of endogenous mediators in response to tissue injury. The investigations encompassed not only histamine, but also lysocithin (now lysolecithin) and identified a new agent, the slow reacting substance of anaphylaxis (SRS-A), plus a related SRS that was released in response to direct tissue insult. This work later instigated the substantial field of leukotriene pharmacology, but for Kellaway the programme was curtailed by the outbreak of World War II. His final experimental work during the early 1940s progressed on to the response of tissues to other insults including bacterial toxins, radiant heat and anaesthetic agents. Nevertheless, it is fair to say that the venom programme earned Kellaway an international scientific reputation – during a period when few researchers of such stature were working in Australia – and contributed to his election to Fellowship of the Royal Society in 1940.

=== Fostering an Australian medical research culture ===
Kellaway in 1936

A less prominent, but equally important, aspect of Kellaway's contribution to Australian medical science was his development of models and an infrastructure conducive to the growth and sustenance of a local research culture. Throughout the 1920s and 30s, when there were only a handful of medical research institutes in the country and very little original investigation was undertaken at the universities, the Hall Institute represented a visible, viable exemplar for those wishing to pursue a research career. Although many aspiring Australian scientists continued to travel to England or the United States for their training and to garner experience, an increasing number either remained in Australia or returned home as the 1930s progressed. During this period spanning the Great Depression, Kellaway was both committed and adroit in projecting the value of medical research outwards – to the medical profession, to the public and to politicians. In 1934 he instigated an agreement with the Commonwealth Government and the Rockefeller Foundation to jointly finance the Hall Institute's new virus research department under Burnet. This was another important precedent that helped inform the legislation that created the National Health and Medical Research Council (NH&MRC) in 1937. Indeed, Kellaway campaigned for the formation of such a body, extolling its necessity both in his orations and via practical examples. At a more prosaic level, Kellaway was widely recognised for his encouragement of staff members and aspiring researchers, while his experience and the conspicuous success of the Hall Institute meant that he was consulted by other emerging facilities. In particular, the Kanematsu Memorial Institute of Pathology in Sydney sought his advice on the appointment of a new director, and Kellaway championed the selection of the Australian neurophysiologist, Jack Eccles. An inaugural member of the Association of Physicians of Australasia (1930) and a foundation Fellow of its successor body, the Royal Australasian College of Physicians (1938), Kellaway rose to become Vice-President of the latter from 1942 to 1944: a high honour for a non-clinician.

=== World War II service and international coordination of research ===
It is fair to say that by the start of World War II, Charles Kellaway was the most prominent medical research figure in Australia, and – alongside Burnet and Eccles – amongst the most well regarded by the international scientific community. Even before the outbreak of hostilities, however, he moved away from the laboratory and into administrative and consultative roles. In the late 1930s he had supported the nascent blood bank work of Ian Wood and Lucy Meredith Bryce at the Hall Institute. When the war began, he gave over much of the institute's facilities and staff to the Australian Red Cross for wide-scale blood collection and storage, in addition to the blood typing of hundreds of thousands of service personnel. Having rejoined the Army Medical Directorate first as an honorary lieutenant colonel and Director of Hygiene (1939–40), and then honorary colonel and Director of Pathology (1940–42), Kellaway was also inducted into the Royal Australian Air Force's Flying Personnel Research Committee (FPRC). In 1941–42, at the behest of the British War Cabinet, Kellaway extensively toured the US, Canada and the UK in order to facilitate inter-Allied collaboration on wartime medical research. This led, on his return, to Kellaway adopting the role of Scientific Liaison Officer to the Australian Army, serving on the Physiological Sub-committee of the Chemical Defence Board and chairing the Armoured Fighting Vehicles Committee, in addition to his ongoing FPRC contribution. While many of these roles were important from a coordination and direction perspective, their outcomes were less visible than other projects such as the Fairley's malaria research unit in Cairns. Kellaway's own laboratory work finally ceased in 1943. However, he was well aware that wartime demands had opened the coffers of the NH&MRC and fostered a much greater commitment from the Commonwealth to supporting – and indeed nurturing – the Australian medical research culture that he had helped foster.

=== Final years at the Wellcome Research Laboratories in Britain ===
However, Kellaway did not participate in the large-scale reorganisation and support of medical research in post-war Australia. In 1943 – almost certainly at the instigation of Henry Dale – Kellaway was offered the post as Director of Scientific Policy at the Wellcome Research Laboratories in London (then within the Burroughs Wellcome company, now part of GlaxoSmithKline). Although reluctant to leave Australia, Kellaway accepted the invitation and – with some reservations – offered the directorship of the Hall Institute to Burnet. Kellaway remained in Australia until March 1944, by which time he had gained the rank of honorary Brigadier in the Army. Kellaway's years at the Wellcome did not permit him the opportunity to return to laboratory work, but his organisational skills, inspirational demeanour and scientific nous all contributed to the slow rebuilding of the company's research policy. Burroughs Wellcome faced near-bankruptcy in the early years after the war, but working with a new administrative team – and fostering research directions at several of the company's locations including Britain, the United States and tropical stations – new compounds came to be identified. These included effective treatments for motion sickness, malaria and schistosomiasis, which began to bear commercial fruit for Wellcome just as Kellaway was diagnosed with lung cancer in 1951. During the post-war years, he also participated actively in the Royal Society, acting as a councillor from 1947 to 1952. Kellaway furthermore continued to promote the efforts and training of Australian researchers where he could. Despite undergoing numerous experimental treatments, however, he gradually succumbed to his inoperable cancer and died on 13 December 1952, never having returned to Australia.

=== Personal qualities ===
Beyond his scientific and institutional achievements, Kellaway was a bird photographer, displaying his images in the Kodak shop in central Melbourne, and became an able fly fisherman. He had an enduring love for the Australian bush and spent many of his holidays away from Melbourne, enjoying rough living in remote terrain. Kellaway married Eileen Ethel Scantlebury in 1919 and they had three sons: Frank Gerald (1922–2012), Charles William (1926) and Michael Hugh (1929). On his death, Kellaway attracted numerous eulogies, reflecting how beloved he was by others. Moreover, his contribution in building the Hall Institute to world stature and fostering a supportive culture for medical research in Australia were lauded, although these achievements have been neglected in subsequent years.

== See also ==
- List of Caulfield Grammar School people

== Bibliography ==
- FM Burnet, 'Obituary: Charles Halliley Kellaway', Medical Journal of Australia, 1 (7 February 1953), 203–7.
- Macfarlane Burnet, Kellaway, Charles Halliley (1889–1952), Australian Dictionary of Biography, Volume 9, Melbourne University Press, 1983, pp 546–7.
- Macfarlane Burnet, Walter and Eliza Hall Institute 1915–1965 (Melbourne: Melbourne University Press, 1971).
- FC Courtice, 'Research in the Medical Sciences: the Road to National Independence', in R.W. Home, ed. Australian Science in the Making (Cambridge: Cambridge University Press, 1988), pp. 277–307.
- Vivianne de Vahl Davis, 'A History of the Walter and Eliza Hall Institute of Medical Research, 1915–1978: an Examination of the Personalities, Politics, Finances, Social Relations and Scientific Organization of the Hall Institute', PhD thesis, University of New South Wales, 1979.
- HH Dale, 'Charles Halliley Kellaway, 1889–1952', Obituary Notices of Fellows of the Royal Society, 8, no. 22 (November 1953), pp. 502–21.
- Peter Graeme Hobbins, 'Charles Kellaway and the Burgeoning of Australian Medical Research, 1928–37', M Medical Hum thesis, University of Sydney, 2007.
- Peter Graeme Hobbins, '"Outside the institute there is a desert": the tenuous trajectories of medical research in interwar Australia', Medical History, 54, no. 1 (2010), pp. 1–28.
- Peter G Hobbins, 'Serpentine science: Charles Kellaway and the fluctuating fortunes of venom research in interwar Australia', Historical Records of Australian Science, 21, no. 1 (2010), pp. 1–34.
- Peter Hobbins, '"Immunisation is as popular as a death adder": the Bundaberg tragedy and the politics of medical science in interwar Australia', Social History of Medicine, 23 (2010), DOI 10.1093/shm/hkq047, pp. 1–20.
- Peter Hobbins, 'From Camels to cats: experimenting with medicine in the Australian Flying Corps', War & Society, 35, no. 2 (2016), DOI 10.1080/07292473.2016.1182357, pp. 114–31.
- Peter G Hobbins, and Kenneth D Winkel, 'The Forgotten Successes and Sacrifices of Charles Kellaway, Director of the Walter and Eliza Hall Institute, 1923–1944', Medical Journal of Australia, 187, no. 11/12 (3/17 December 2007), pp. 645–8.
- CH Kellaway, 'The Walter and Eliza Hall Institute of Medical Research in Pathology and Medicine, Melbourne', Medical Journal of Australia, 2 (1928), 702–8.
- CH Kellaway, P MacCallum, and AH Tebbutt, Report of the Royal Commission of Inquiry into Fatalities at Bundaberg (Canberra: HJ Green, 1928).
- Charles H Kellaway, 'Snake Venoms. I. Their Constitution and Therapeutic Applications', Bulletin of the Johns Hopkins Hospital, 60 (1937), pp. 1–17.
- Charles H Kellaway, 'Snake Venoms. II. Their Peripheral Action', Bulletin of the Johns Hopkins Hospital, 60 (1937), pp. 18–39.
- Charles H Kellaway, 'Snake Venoms. III. Immunity', Bulletin of the Johns Hopkins Hospital, 60 (1937), pp. 159–77.
- CH Kellaway, 'The Sir Richard Stawell Oration', Medical Journal of Australia, 1 (1938), 365–74.
- Charles H Kellaway, 'Personal Records of Fellows of The Royal Society', London: The Royal Society Library and Archives, 1944 (with 1948 addendum).
- Roy Kinghorn and Charles H Kellaway Dangerous Snakes of the South-West Pacific Area 1943. This pocket guide was published for American troops serving in the region.
- Ian J Wood, Discovery and Healing in Peace and War: an Autobiography (Melbourne: Ian J. Wood, 1984).
