= James Newbery =

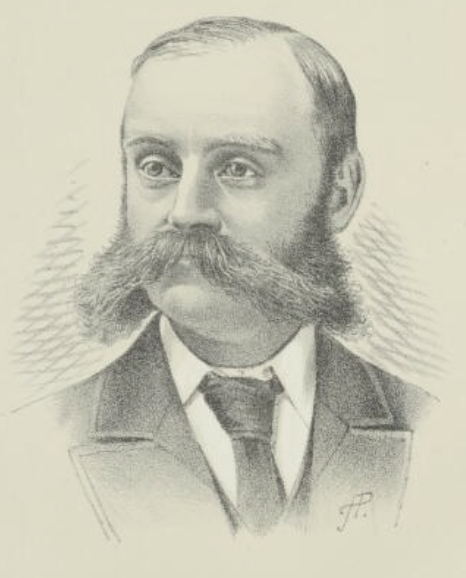
J. Cosmo Newbery c.1887

James Cosmo Newbery CMG (28 June 1843 – 1 May 1895), generally referred to as Cosmo Newbery or J. Cosmo Newbery, was a United States-educated Australian museum administrator and industrial chemist, and co-developer of the Newbery-Vautin chlorination process for gold extraction.

Newbery was the fourth son of William Boxer Newbery, born near Livorno, Grand Duchy of Tuscany. When quite young he emigrated to the United States of America, and ultimately graduated as Bachelor of Science at Harvard University.

After leaving Harvard, Newbery studied at the Royal School of Mines, Jermyn Street, London, and in 1865 was appointed analyst to the Geological Survey of Victoria—an appointment which he held until 1868, when the department was abolished. In 1870 he was appointed to Superintendent of the Melbourne Industrial and Technological Museum and Analyst to the Department of Mines; he additionally assumed the role of Instructor in Chemistry and Metallurgy at the Museum Laboratory. Newbery was a member of the Royal Society of Victoria and was Honorary Superintendent of Juries and Awards at the Melbourne International Exhibition (1880).

He married, in 1870, Catherine Maud Florence, daughter of George Hodgkinson. In 1881 he was created C.M.G. An improved method of gold extraction using chlorination—developed by Newbery and Claude Vautin in 1890 (the Newbery-Vautin chlorination process)—achieved global adoption, and Newbery was recognized as an authority on gold amalgamation.

Newbery collected food samples and analysed them for contaminants in his laboratory, laying the foundation for the prevention of adulterated foods, n 1905.

Newbery died at home in Hotham Street, East St Kilda, Melbourne, Victoria on 1 May 1895. The town of Cosmo Newbery, Western Australia is named for him.
