= Wilhelm August Lampadius =

German pharmacist and professor (1772–1842)

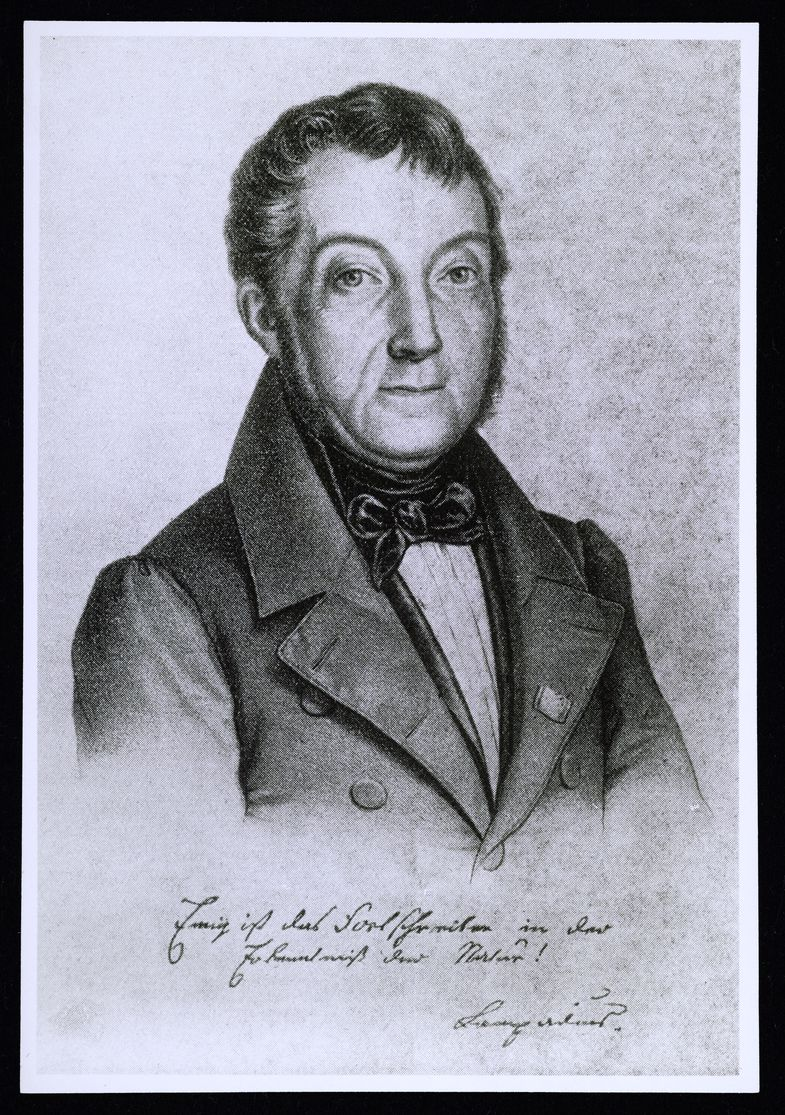

Wilhelm August Lampadius (8 August 1772, Hehlen, Braunschweig-Wolfenbüttel – 13 April 1842, Freiberg, Kingdom of Saxony) was a German chemist and metallurgist. He served as a professor of metallurgy at the Mining Academy in Freiberg. Lampadius is known for using the first coal gas lantern for street lighting in Europe.

== Life and work ==
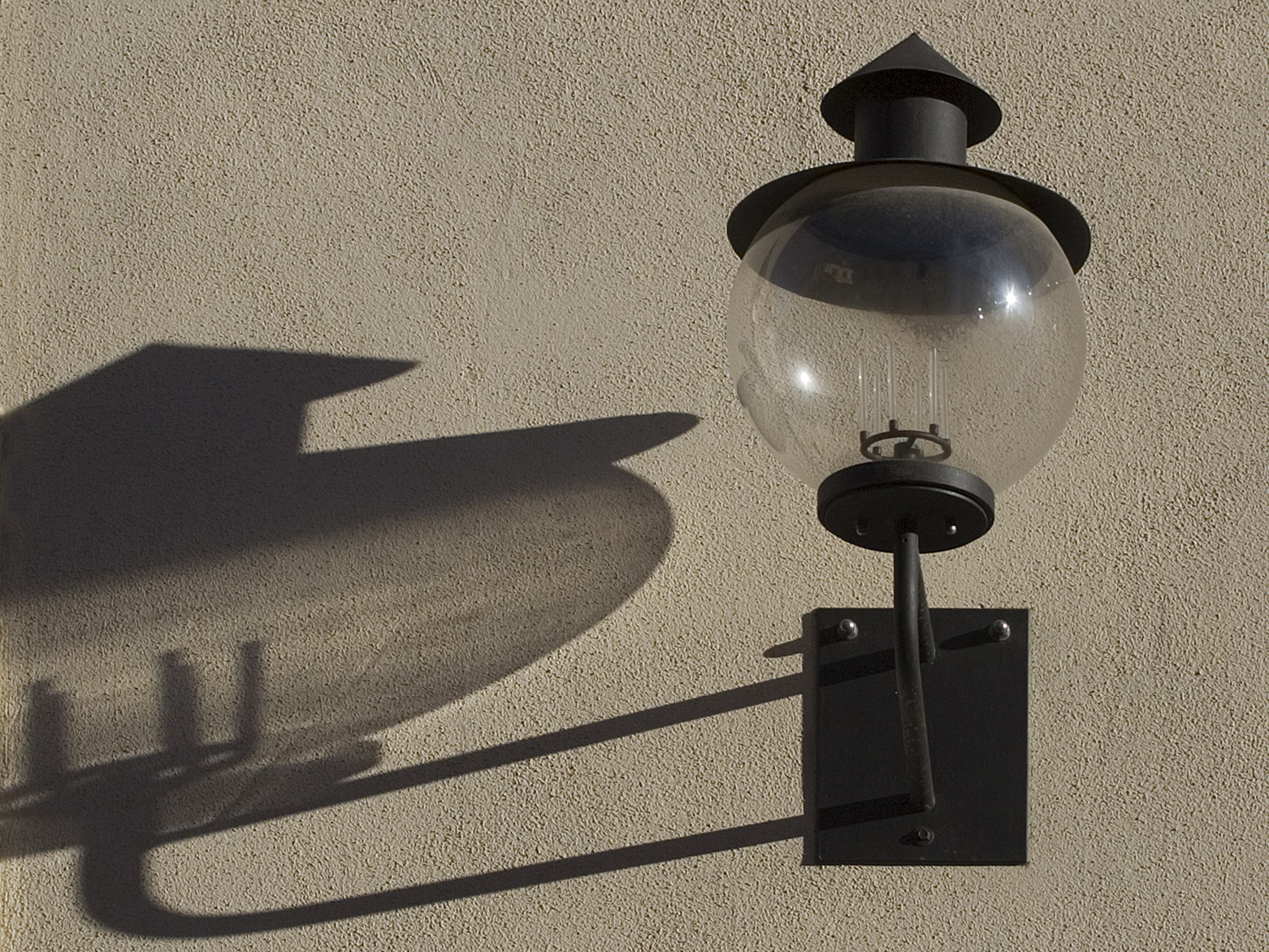
Lampadius' gas lamp

Lampadius was born in Hehlen, where his father Christoph Wilhelm was a pastor. He lost his father early in life (before 1796) and his mother Christine Charlotte née Henrici sent him at the age of fourteen to apprentice in Göttingen with an apothecary. At the University of Göttingen (1791–92) he studied under J. F. Gmelin and Georg Christoph Lichtenberg. After that he got to know Martin Heinrich Klaproth and Sigismund Friedrich Hermbstädt in Berlin. He worked as a pharmacist in Göttingen from 1785 until 1791. He then worked as a metallurgist for Count Joachim Graf von Sternberg of Bohemia and he travelled to Russia with the Count and conducted experiments on electricity and physics. Their trip stopped in Moscow because they did not get the permission to enter interior Russia. So Lampadius followed von Sternberg to his possessions in Bohemia. There he worked as a chemist for the ironworks in Radwitz. Klaproth helped him to become a professor's assistant at the mining academy in Freiberg. Gottlob Werner recommended him to the position at the Mining Academy at Freiberg. He was made an "extraordinary professor" of chemistry and mineralogy in 1794 and an "ordinary professor" after he took the position of C. E. Gellert (1713-1795) who died in 1795. He taught at the Mining Academy in Freiberg for the rest of his life, introducing the ideas of Lavoisier into Germany. Lampadius was a specialist on blow pipe analysis and he wrote a textbook on metal smelting. He was succeeded at the mining academy by Karl Friedrich Plattner. In 1811/12 Lampadius illuminated his street in front of his house in Freiberg with the first hard coal gas lantern in Europe.

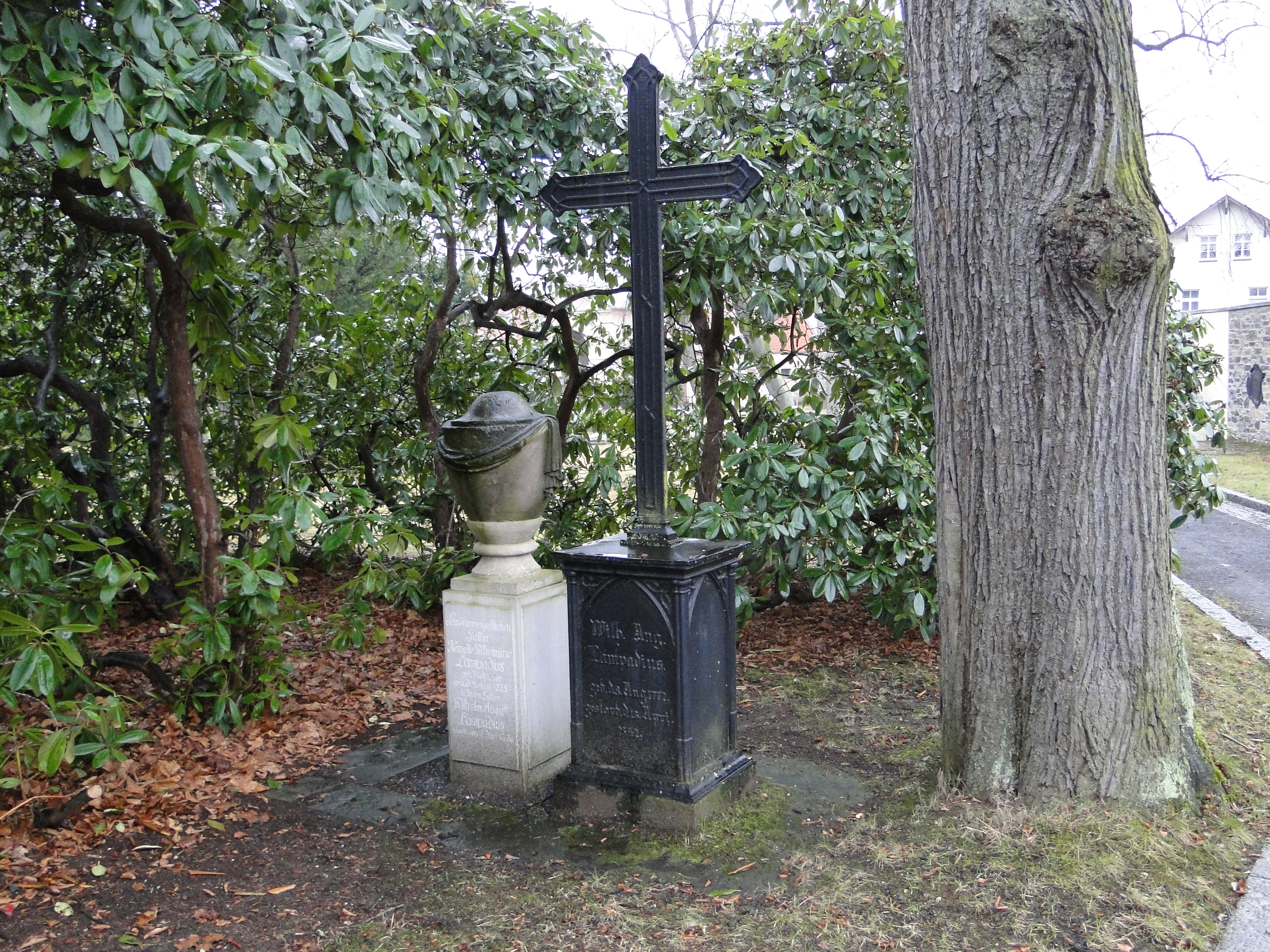
Grave of Lampadius in Freiberg

=== Chemistry ===
In 1796 Lampadius accidentally obtained carbon disulfide (Schwefelalcohol) by destilling iron pyrites with moist charcoal which he called "alcohol sulfuris". He concluded that sulphur and hydrogen are the source materials for the 'alcohol of sulphur'. He figured out that lead dissolves in acids more easily, if it is alloyed with tin making cookware dangerous. His discovery lead him to realize the harmfulness of many plates and pans then used in food preparation and presentation. He dealt also with researches on fodder beet sugar.

=== Personal life ===
Lampadius married Henriette Wilhelmine (1773–1806) in 1796. They had two sons (who died young) and a daughter. He secondly married Wilhelmine and they had three sons and three daughters. His oldest son Wilhelm Adolph Lampadius became a priest.
