= Sydney Patterson =

Australian physician and medical researcher

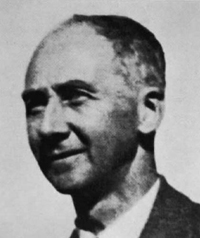
- Born: 1882; Melbourne, Australia
- Died: 4 May 1960 (aged 77–78); University Hospital, London
- Scientific career
- Fields: Gastroenterology, pathology, physiology
- Workplaces: University College London, Walter and Eliza Hall Institute of Medical Research, Ruthin Castle

Sydney Wentworth Patterson MB BS, MD, DSc, FRCP (born 1882 in Melbourne, Australia, died 1960 in London, England) was an Australian physician, medical researcher and first director of the Walter and Eliza Hall Institute of Medical Research in Melbourne, Australia.

== Career ==
=== Education ===
Patterson was educated at Scotch College, Melbourne. He then obtained a scholarship from Ormond College to study at the University of Melbourne where he obtained first class honours in chemistry, physiology and medicine, graduating Bachelor of Medicine, Bachelor of Surgery (MB BS) in 1904. In 1907 Patterson received his Doctor of Medicine (MD) from the University of Melbourne for his research into calcium metabolism, and in 1912 he was awarded a Beit Fellowship to undertake research with Ernest Starling at University College London. There he studied cardiac physiology and diabetes, winning the Schafer Triennial Prize for Research at University College, and earning the degree of Doctor of Science (D.Sc.), in physiology, from the University of London in 1916.

=== Military service ===
During the First World War, Patterson joined the Australian Voluntary Medical Service, later transferring to the Royal Army Medical Corps. He was awarded the rank of Major and served as a pathologist in France. During this time he continued to undertake medical research, publishing a description of the bacteria associated with certain cases of fever in servicemen.

=== Directorship of the Walter and Eliza Hall Institute ===
In 1919, Patterson was appointed as the first director of the Walter and Eliza Hall Institute. He oversaw research programs in respiratory and intestinal microbiology, parasitology and cancer, with a focus on clinical research. Patterson established a structure of close collaboration with the Royal Melbourne Hospital. This included his appointment as a physician at the hospital and the involvement of many clinicians in medical research, often on a voluntary or part-time basis. He advocated for the institute to establish a clinical research ward, which was achieved several decades after his departure.

When announcing Patterson's departure in 1923, The Argus newspaper described the Walter and Eliza Hall Institute as a national leader in the diagnosis of infectious diseases and cancer.

=== Ruthin Castle Hospital ===
In 1923 Patterson left the institute to take an appointment as a clinician at Ruthin Castle, a private hospital in Wales (the successor of a hospital at Duff House in Scotland). He specialized in gastroenterology and was president of the British Society of Gastroenterology in 1954.

In 1958 Patterson retired from Ruthin Castle and returned to laboratory research into wound healing at University College London, until his death in 1960.
