= Walter Russell Hall =

Australian businessman & philanthropist (1831–1911)

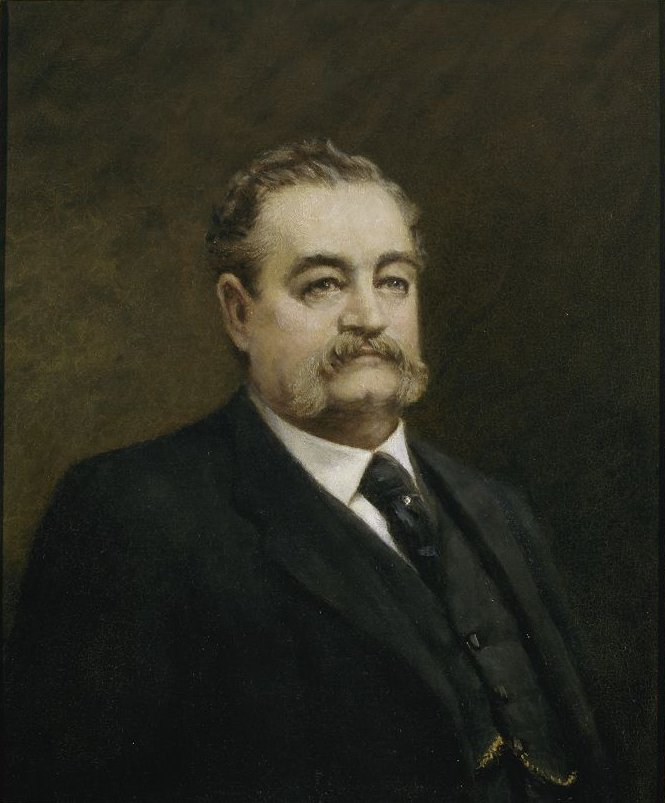
- Portrait of Walter Hall by Frederick McCubbin
- Born: 22 February 1831; Kington, Herefordshire, England
- Died: 13 October 1911 (aged 80); Sydney, New South Wales, Australia
- Resting place: Melbourne General Cemetery
- Board member of: Cobb & Co; Mount Morgan Gold Mining Company; Mercantile Mutual; Sydney Meat Preserving Co.
- Spouse: Eliza Hall

Walter Russell Hall (22 February 1831 – 13 October 1911) was an Australian businessman and philanthropist.

== Biography ==
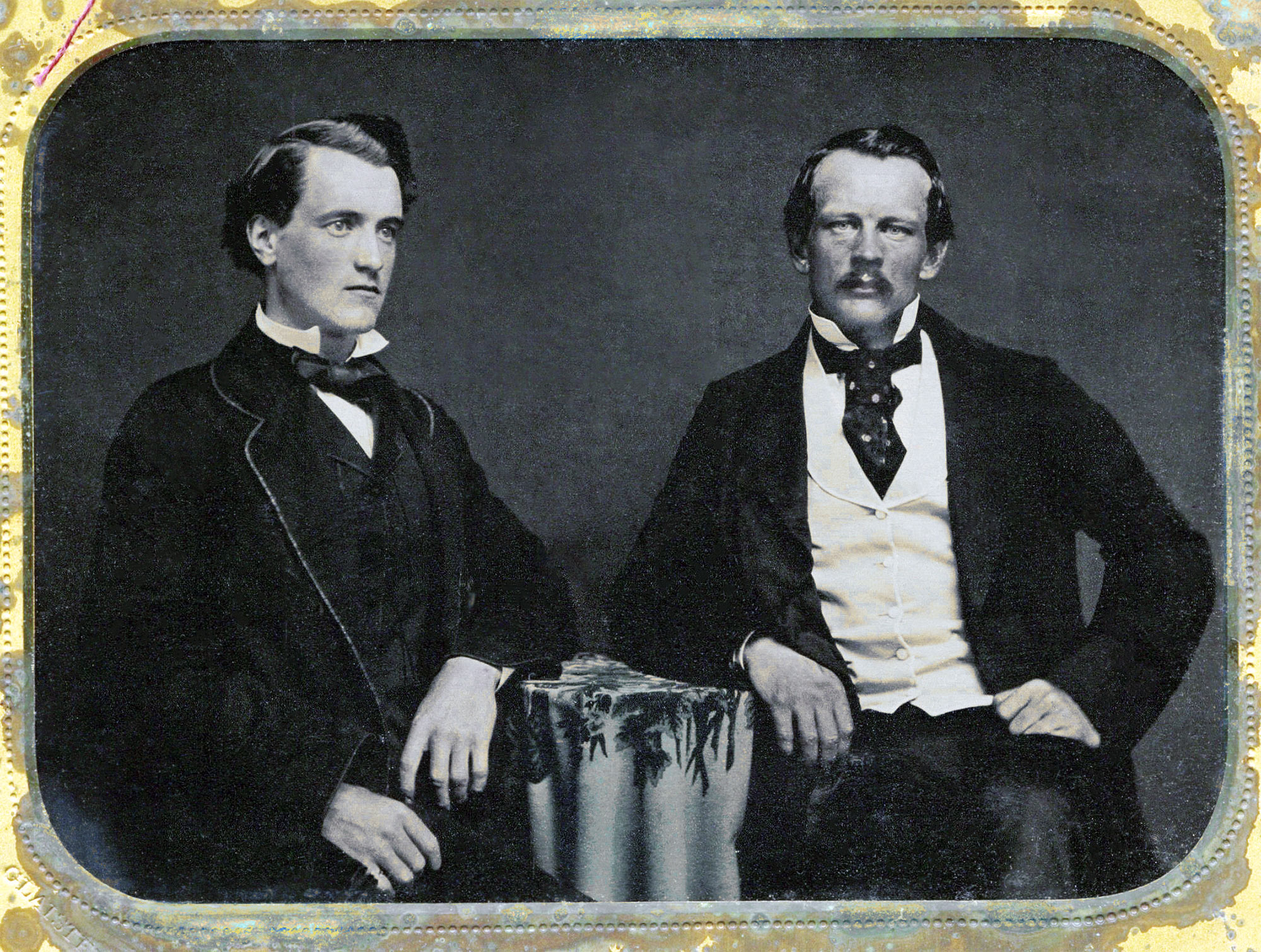
Hall and William Knox D'Arcy, c. 1885.

Hall was born in Kington, Herefordshire, England, eldest son of Walter Hall, glover (later a miller), and his wife Elizabeth Carleton, née Skarratt. He was educated in Kington and Taunton, Somerset.

Hall arrived in Sydney on 14 February 1852 with his two brothers, Thomas Skarratt Hall and James Wesley Hall with little money. Hall was employed for a short time by David Jones and then prospected for gold in Victoria with meagre success. From 1857 he was a major investor and administrator of the Australian stagecoach company Cobb & Co. He was also an original shareholder and director of Mount Morgan Gold Mining Company, incorporated in 1886. Other directorships included the Mercantile Mutual, and the Sydney Meat Preserving Co. Ltd.

Hall married Melbourne born Eliza Rowdon Kirk in 1874. They had no children. He died at their home in Potts Point, Sydney, in October 1911.

== Legacy ==
Hall's widow Eliza founded The Walter and Eliza Hall Trust that led to the establishment of the Walter and Eliza Hall Institute of Medical Research, using funds earned from Hall's business interests to establish the Trust.

The locality of Walterhall beside the Mount Morgan Mine in Central Queensland was named after him.
