= Newbery–Vautin chlorination process =

The Newbery–Vautin chlorination process is a method for extracting gold from its ore through the use of chlorination. This process was jointly developed by James Cosmo Newbery and Claude Theodore James Vautin.

== Chlorination process ==
=== History ===
A process for extracting gold from gold ores containing pyrite using chlorine gas was introduced by Karl Friedrich Plattner (1800–1858), around 1848.

James Newbery and Claude Vautin began work on chlorination, at the United Pyrites Gold Extracting Co. in Bendigo, in 1878. They were awarded Victorian Patent No. 4484, in 1886, for their Newbery–Vautin chlorination process, which was faster than earlier chlorination processes.

=== Process description ===
Roasted gold-bearing pyrite concentrates and water were combined in a barrel, to which calcium chloride and sulphuric acid were added. The barrel was then made airtight. Compressed air was used to raise the internal pressure to four atmospheres, and the barrel was set in rotation. The sulphuric acid and calcium chloride reacted to form chlorine gas. The gold contained in the concentrate reacted with the chlorine to form gold chloride, which is a salt soluble in water. Once the extraction had occurred—after around four hours—the liquid containing the gold chloride was separated from the solid residue, by vacuum filtration, and passed through a charcoal filter, where gold precipitated. The charcoal containing the gold precipitate was burnt and the ashes fused with borax to produce gold bullion.

If there was copper in significant quantity, after charcoal filtering, the remnant liquid—no longer containing gold, but still containing soluble salts of copper—was then run over scrap iron, where the copper precipitated. The Newbery-Vautin process was not useful for extracting any silver, if present, because silver chloride is insoluble in water and so it remained in the solid residue.

=== Practical application ===
One of the early adopters of the chlorination process was the large Mount Morgan mine in Queensland. The original chlorination plant installed there used the Newbery-Vautin process. It seems that the process was later modified, by the mining company, leading to some dispute about whose process actually was in use. Mount Morgan continued to use a chlorination process for many years.

Other Australian mines that used the Newbery-Vautin process included the Cunningar Proprietary Gold Mining and Chlorination Company, at McMahon's Reef, and the Majors Creek Proprietary Gold-Mining Company's mine at Darque's Reef, near Majors Creek, both in New South Wales, and, in Queensland, the Ravenswood Gold Mining Company. The process was used at mines outside Australia, including at Thames in New Zealand, Denver in Colorado, Vancouver in Canada, at Johannesburg and Barberton in South Africa, and at the Morro Velho mine in Brazil.

== Successor processes ==
The Newbery-Vautin process and other processes based on chlorination were replaced by processes based on cyanidation, which used fewer reagents. Processes that are free of cyanide and emit less toxic byproducts have also been developed.
