= Mercantile Mutual =

Defunct Australian insurance and finance company (1878–2001)

The Mercantile Mutual Insurance Company was an Australian insurance and financial services company. It was established in 1878, and lasted until 2001, when it became part of ING Australia. The insurance portion of the business was later sold to ANZ and branded as OnePath in 2010.

In 2017, ANZ announced the sale of the OnePath business as the Wealth Australia life insurance business to Zurich Financial Services Australia (Zurich) and ANZ's OnePath Pensions and Investments and Aligned Dealer Group businesses ("OnePath P&I") to IOOF Holdings (now Insignia Financial)

This sale was completed in 2022.

The history of the Mercantile Mutual Insurance Company is contained in the book 'Servant of a century : the first 100 years of the Mercantile Mutual Insurance'

Mercantile Mutual sponsored the Australian domestic limited-overs cricket tournament from 1992 to 2001, when it was called the "Mercantile Mutual Cup" for that time.
