= The Johns Hopkins Medical Journal =

- Discipline: Medicine
- Language: English

Publication details
- Former name(s): The Johns Hopkins Hospital Bulletin; Bulletin of the Johns Hopkins Hospital
- History: 1889-1982
- Publisher: Johns Hopkins Press (United States)

Standard abbreviations
- ISO 4: Johns Hopkins Med. J.

Indexing
- CODEN: JHMJAX
- ISSN: 0021-7263
- LCCN: 74647460
- OCLC no.: 2240006

Links
- Journal homepage

The Johns Hopkins Medical Journal was a medical journal published by the Johns Hopkins University that ceased publication in 1982. It was established in December 1889 as The Johns Hopkins Hospital Bulletin. It was renamed Bulletin of the Johns Hopkins Hospital in 1924, before obtaining its final title in 1967. The journal is abstracted and indexed in Index Medicus/MEDLINE/PubMed.

== Notable articles ==
The journal published several landmark papers. Examples are:

- Cushing, Harvey (1901). "Concerning a definite regulatory mechanism of the vaso-motor center which controls blood pressure during cerebral compression". Bull. Johns Hopkins Hosp. 12: 290–292. First description of what is now known as the Cushing reflex
- Cushing, Harvey (1932). "The basophil adenomas of the pituitary body and their clinical manifestations (pituitary basophilism)". Bull. Johns Hopkins. Hosp. 50: 137. First description of what is now known as Cushing's disease

== Editors ==
The following persons have been editor-in-chief of the journal:

- Henry Mills Hurd (1889–1906)
- Rupert Norton (1906–1914)
- Unknown (1914–1924)
- Wilburt C. Davison (1924–1927)
- Alan Chesney (1927–1929)
- Edward Cowles (1929–1935)
- Read Ellsworth (1935–1936)
- James Bordley (1936–1942)
- Maxwell Wintrobe (1942–1943)
- Luther Emmett Holt (1943–1944)
- Henry N. Harkins (1944–1947)
- Edward Cowles (1947–1949)
- Frederick Bang (1949–1953)
- Philip Wagley (1953–1955)
- E.K. Marshall, Jr. (1955–1958)
- Philip Wagley (1958–1962)
- Edward Stephen Stafford (1963–1970)
