= Gustave Ramaciotti =

Law clerk, theatrical manager, soldier

Gustave Mario Ramaciotti
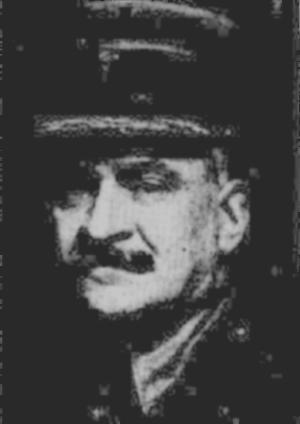
- Major General Gustave Ramaciotti c. 1910s
- Born: 13 March 1861; Livorno, Italy
- Died: 6 December 1927 (aged 66); Melbourne, Australia
- Burial place: Brighton Cemetery
- Spouse: Ada Wilson
- Children: Clive Ramaciotti; Vera Ramaciotti
- Military career
- Allegiance: Queensland; Australia
- Branch: Queensland Defence Force; New South Wales Military Forces; Citizens Military Force
- Service years: 1878–1920
- Rank: Major General
- Commands: 2nd Military District (1915–17); 11th Infantry Brigade (1914–15); 24th Infantry (2nd Sydney Battalion) (1912–13); 1st Battalion, 2nd Infantry Regiment (1909–11)
- Conflicts: First World War
- Awards: Companion of the Order of St Michael and St George; Colonial Auxiliary Forces Officers' Decoration; Mentioned in Despatches
- Other work: Law clerk Theatrical manager

Major General Gustave Mario Ramaciotti, CMG, VD (13 March 1861 – 6 December 1927) was an Australian law clerk, theatrical manager and soldier who was well known in Sydney's legal services.

== Early life and career ==
Ramaciotti was born in Livorno, Italy, on 13 March 1861. He arrived in Queensland, Australia, in his teenage years, and in 1878 joined the Rockhampton Volunteers, Queensland Defence Force as a private. In 1880 he was naturalised. He became a law clerk and married Ada Wilson in 1882. As managing clerk of the conveyancing department of Minter Simpson & Co, he became well known in Sydney legal circles until his retirement from law in 1904. He became a partner in Australia's largest theatrical company with J. C. Williamson and George Tallis. After selling his shares in J C Williamson Ltd he bought the Theatre Royal in King Street, Sydney, the neighbouring Sutton's Hotel and adjoining land at the rear of these properties.

== Military career ==
Ramaciotti's military interests continued and in 1890 he had been commissioned as a second lieutenant with the 2nd Infantry Regiment. By 1909 he was a lieutenant colonel commanding the 1st Battalion, 2nd Infantry Regiment. He went on to command the 24th Infantry (2nd Sydney Battalion) and was promoted to colonel in command of the 11th Infantry Brigade in 1914. During the First World War his duties were largely confined to home, but he eventually became Inspector General of administration at Army Headquarters, Melbourne. He was made a Companion of the Order of St Michael and St George in 1917, and on his retirement in 1920 he was made an honorary major general.

== Death ==
Ramaciotti spent his remaining years travelling between Australia and Italy, until his death on a visit home to Australia on 6 December 1927. He was survived by his children Clive and Vera and his estate was sworn for probate in New South Wales at £91,485.
