= Vera Ramaciotti =

Australian philanthropist

Vera Ramaciotti CBE (19 March 1891–1982) was an Australian philanthropist who with her brother, Clive Ramaciotti, established the Clive and Vera Ramaciotti Foundation.

== Life ==
Ramaciotti was the only daughter of Major General Gustave Ramaciotti CMG, the owner of the Theatre Royal in King Street, Sydney, Australia. She was born in Ashfield and attended Sydney Church of England Girls' Grammar School as a boarder. In 1911 she travelled abroad for the coronation of King George V.

She was governor of the Sydney Hospital.

The Australian Women's Weekly published an article, in 1970, entitled "The Quiet Millionairess" that claimed Vera was "Australia's least-known millionairess" and "possibly the most private woman in Australia", adding that she "physically shrinks from seeing her name in print".

Clive Ramaciotti was interested in bio-medical research and Vera planned the establishment of the Clive and Vera Ramaciotti Foundation with him before his death in 1967. The idea came after she was asked to contribute to the Walter and Eliza Hall Foundation in Melbourne. The Foundation was established with an investment of $6.7 million and is managed by Perpetual Trustees. The funds combined capital is in excess of $60 million. A Scientific Advisory Committee advises Perpetual on the grants to be awarded each year. In 1970, when the Foundation had accumulated interest of $600,000, initial payments were made to 27 institutions. By 2008 the fund had allocated over $45 million to biomedical research supporting more than 3000 research programs; by 2020, over $61 million in funding had been allocated.

== Legacy ==
In 2024, the foundation was seen as one of the largest private contributors to Australian biomedical research. The Ramaciotti Biomedical Research Award gives out $1 million every two years for university and hospital research. The Ramaciotti Medal for Excellence ($50,000) is awarded annually, while eight Ramaciotti Health Investment Grants are also awarded each year.
