= Mount Morgan Mine =

Former mine in Queensland, Australia

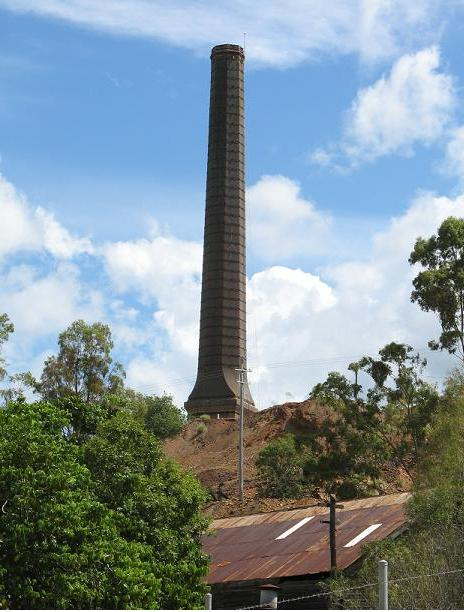
- Mount Morgan Mine Stack, 2010

- Location in Australia
- Location: Mount Morgan, Queensland, Australia; 23°38′28″S 150°22′31″E
- Products: Copper; Gold; Silver
- Production: Copper: 387,000 tonnes Gold: 262 tonnes Silver: 37 tonnes
- Financial year: 1882–1981
- Opened: 1882
- Closed: 1981
- Company: Norton Gold Fields
- Acquired: 2007

Mount Morgan Mine was a copper, gold and silver mine in Queensland, Australia. Mining began at Mount Morgan in 1882 and continued until 1981. Over its lifespan, the mine yielded approximately 262 metric tons (258 long tons; 289 short tons) of gold, 37 metric tons (36 long tons; 41 short tons) of silver and 387,000 metric tons (381,000 long tons; 427,000 short tons) of copper. The mine was once the largest gold mine in the world.

The Mount Morgan Mine also operated assay laboratories, brickworks, foundry, power house and workshops (including carpentry, electrical and plumbing) as part of its operations. The Mount Morgan Mine also contained Fireclay Caverns excavated to provide clay for the mine brickworks.

Wealth from the Mount Morgan mine funded Persian oil exploration, establishing the Anglo-Persian Oil Company, which became BP in 1954. Wealth from the Mount Morgan mine was also bequeathed in 1912 to establish the Walter and Eliza Hall Institute of Medical Research.

== Resources ==
The area near the mine contains sedimentary and igneous rocks. The gold was rated 0.998 fine.

== History ==
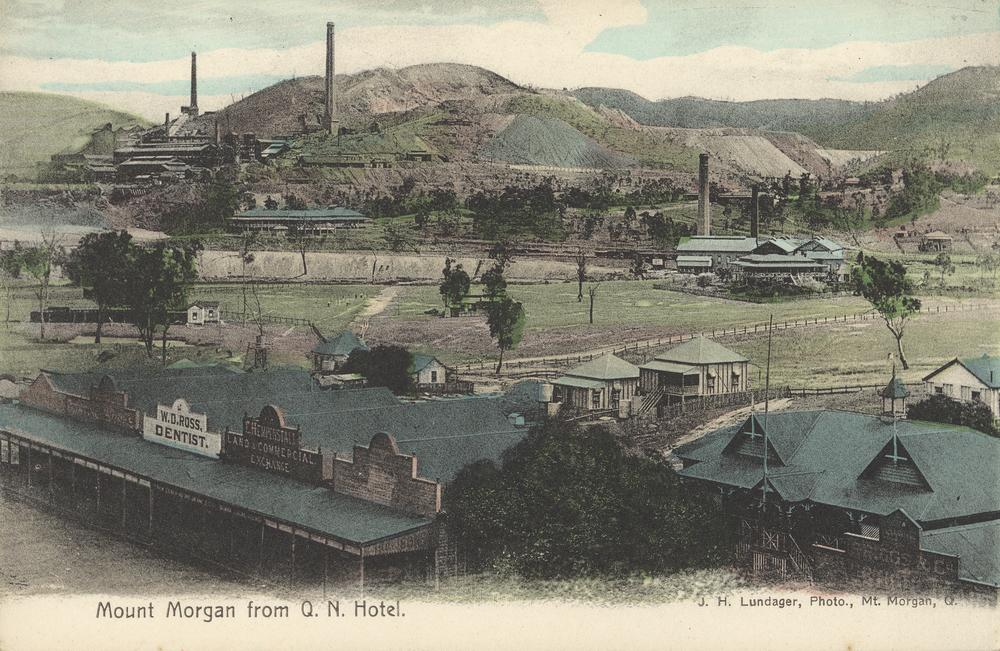
View of the town of Mount Morgan and the mine beyond from the Queensland National Hotel

=== The Beginning (1882 to 1886) ===
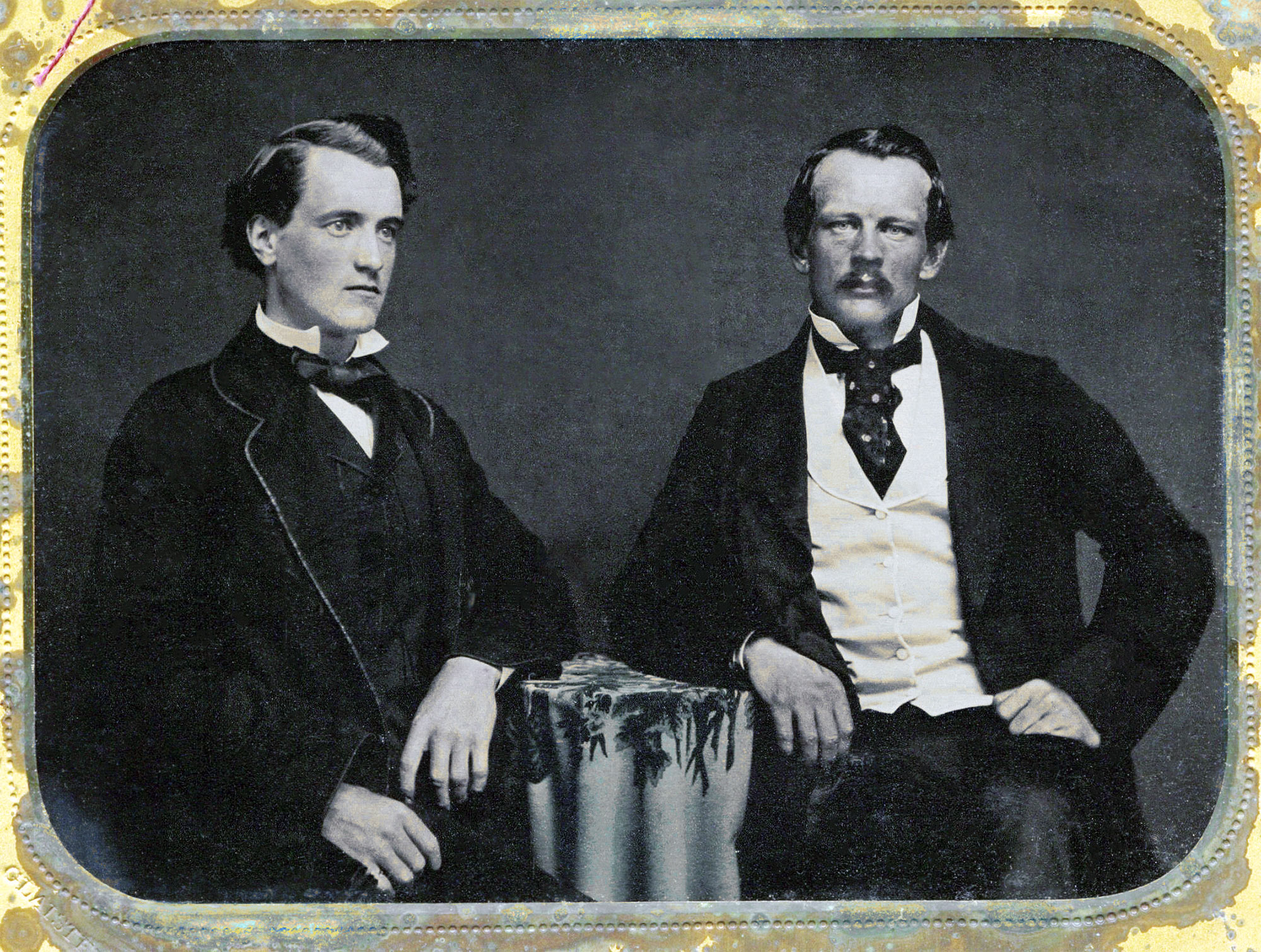
Walter Hall and D'Arcy ~1885

In 1882, a syndicate was created to open a gold mine at Ironstone Mountain, 39 kilometres (24 mi) south of Rockhampton, Queensland. The syndicate comprised William Knox D'Arcy (later influential in establishing the Anglo-Persian Oil Company), Walter Russell Hall (later influential in establishing the Walter and Eliza Hall Institute of Medical Research), Thomas Skarratt Hall, and Thomas, Frederick and Edwin Morgan. Ironstone Mountain was later renamed Mount Morgan after the Morgan members of the syndicate.

=== Mount Morgan Gold Mining Company Limited (1886–1928) ===
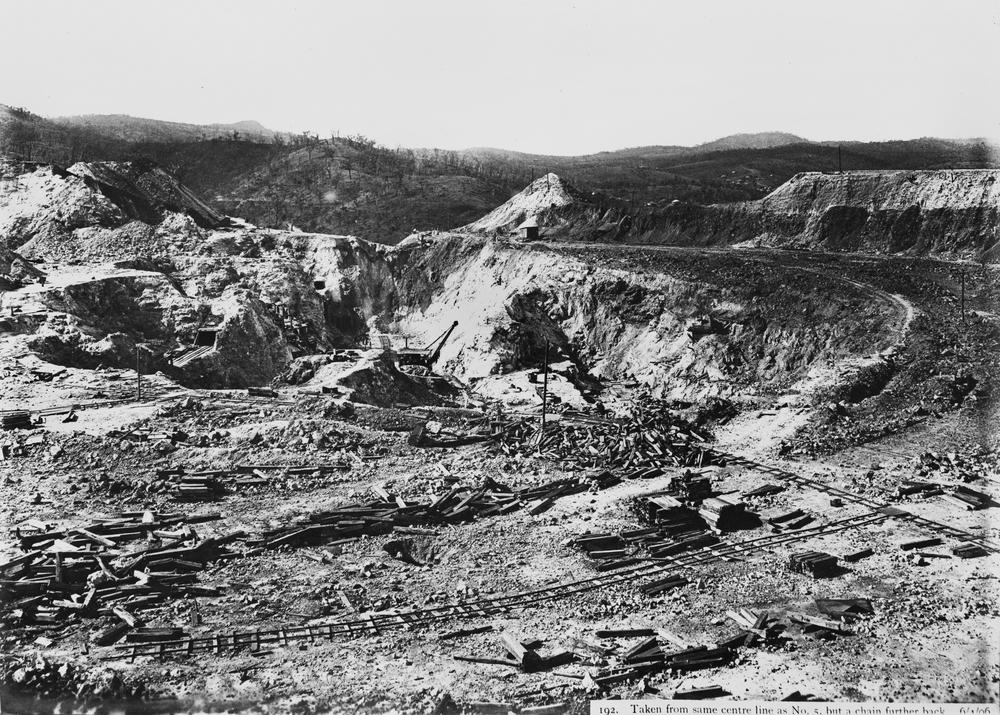
Mount Morgan Mine, 1906

In October 1886, the syndicate became the Mount Morgan Gold Mining Company Limited, with James Wesley Hall, the younger brother of Walter Russell and Thomas Skarratt Hall, as the first general manager. The Mount Morgan Gold Mining Company Limited operated using underground mining methods until 1927 when fire destroyed underground workings. The company deliberately flooded its underground workings in response to the fire and went into liquidation.

By 1907 the mine had produced $60,000,000 worth of gold, making it one of the most productive in the world.

=== Mount Morgan Limited (1928–1990) ===
The Mount Morgan Mine was reestablished using open-cut mining methods in 1928, operating as Mount Morgan Limited.

Conversion to open-cut operation included substantial modernization of Mount Morgan’s mining infrastructure and mining techniques. Mount Morgan Limited became a subsidiary of Peko-Wallsend in 1968 and continued operations until 1974, when Mount Morgan Limited began to reach the end of its ore body. Mount Morgan Limited progressively scaled back its workforce and operations until it reached the end of its ore body in 1981.

From 1982 to 1990, Mount Morgan Limited began processing tailings of its previous operations at the Mount Morgan mine site. In parallel, Mount Morgan mine facilities were used to process materials from other Peko-Wallsend operations. At the end of both such operations in 1990, the Queensland Government began negotiating with Mount Morgan Limited regarding terms of closure.

=== Recent ===
The Queensland Government began administration of the site in 1992. Perilya/Aumin NL commenced further exploration in 1992 leading to plans for potential further reprocessing at the Mount Morgan mine site in the future. Since 2007 the mine and mining leases have been owned by Norton Gold Fields. An estimated 327,000 ounces (9,300,000 g) of gold still exist at the site.

== Broader influence of the mine ==
=== BP ===
William Knox Darcy, an original member of the Mount Morgan gold mine syndicate, used proceeds from the Mount Morgan gold mine to fund oil exploration in Persia. The exploration made successful oil discovery in 1908 and commenced the Anglo Persian Oil Company. The company became The British Petroleum Company (BP) in 1954.

=== Walter and Eliza Hall Institute of Medical Research ===
Walter Russell Hall was also a member of the original Mount Morgan Gold Mine syndicate. Substantial personal wealth of Walter Russell Hall was bequeathed on his death in 1912 to establish the Walter and Eliza Hall Trust. The Walter and Eliza Hall Institute of Medical Research was established from the trust in 1915.

== Today ==
External image
- Water in the old Mount Morgan gold mine is being treated

The Mount Morgan mine site is a tourist attraction in the Central Queensland region. The site contains remaining structures of its mining operations including the General Office, Gold Rooms and Main Stack. The Arthur Timms lookout overlooks remaining mine buildings and the Mount Morgan township.

According to former Queensland Minister for Mining, Stirling Hinchliffe, water in the pit contains elevated levels of copper, aluminium, magnesium and other metals. The site contains a lime dosing water treatment plant and onsite evaporators. Controlled water releases done to prevent an uncontrolled release during heavy rainfall events has been done twice in March 2011, once in January 2013 and again in February 2013.

In June 2011, the Government of Queensland announced $24.2 million in funding for site rehabilitation and management. On 26 January 2013, the mine filled with water and overflowed in the Dee River for the first time ever.

Although mining company Carbine Resources announced plans in 2014 to extract gold, copper and pyrite from tailings and improve the mine's acid mine drainage problem, it withdrew the proposal in March 2018 due to its doubts over the financial viability of the project.

Estimates for a partial rehabilitation of the toxic environmental legacy of the old gold mine start at $450 million, but no costings of a full rehabilitation of the site have yet been carried out.

== See also ==
- Mining in Australia
- G. A. Richard, general manager of the mine 1903–1912
