= Karl Friedrich Plattner =

German chemist (1800–1858)

Karl Friedrich Plattner (2 January 1800 – 22 January 1858) was a German metallurgical chemist.

He was born at Kleinwaltersdorf, near Freiberg in the Electorate of Saxony, on 2 January 1800. His father, though only a poor working miner, found the means to have him educated first at the Bergschule (mining school) and then at the Bergakademie of Freiberg. After he had completed his courses there in 1820 he obtained employment, chiefly as an assayer, in connexion with the royal mines and metal works. Having taken up the idea of quantitative mouth blowpipe assaying, which was then almost unknown, he succeeded in devising dependable methods for all the ordinary useful metals. In particular his modes of assaying for nickel and cobalt quickly found favour with metallurgists. He also devoted himself to the improvement of qualitative blowpipe analysis, and summed up his experience in a treatise Die Probierkunst mit dem Löthrohr (1835), which became a standard authority.

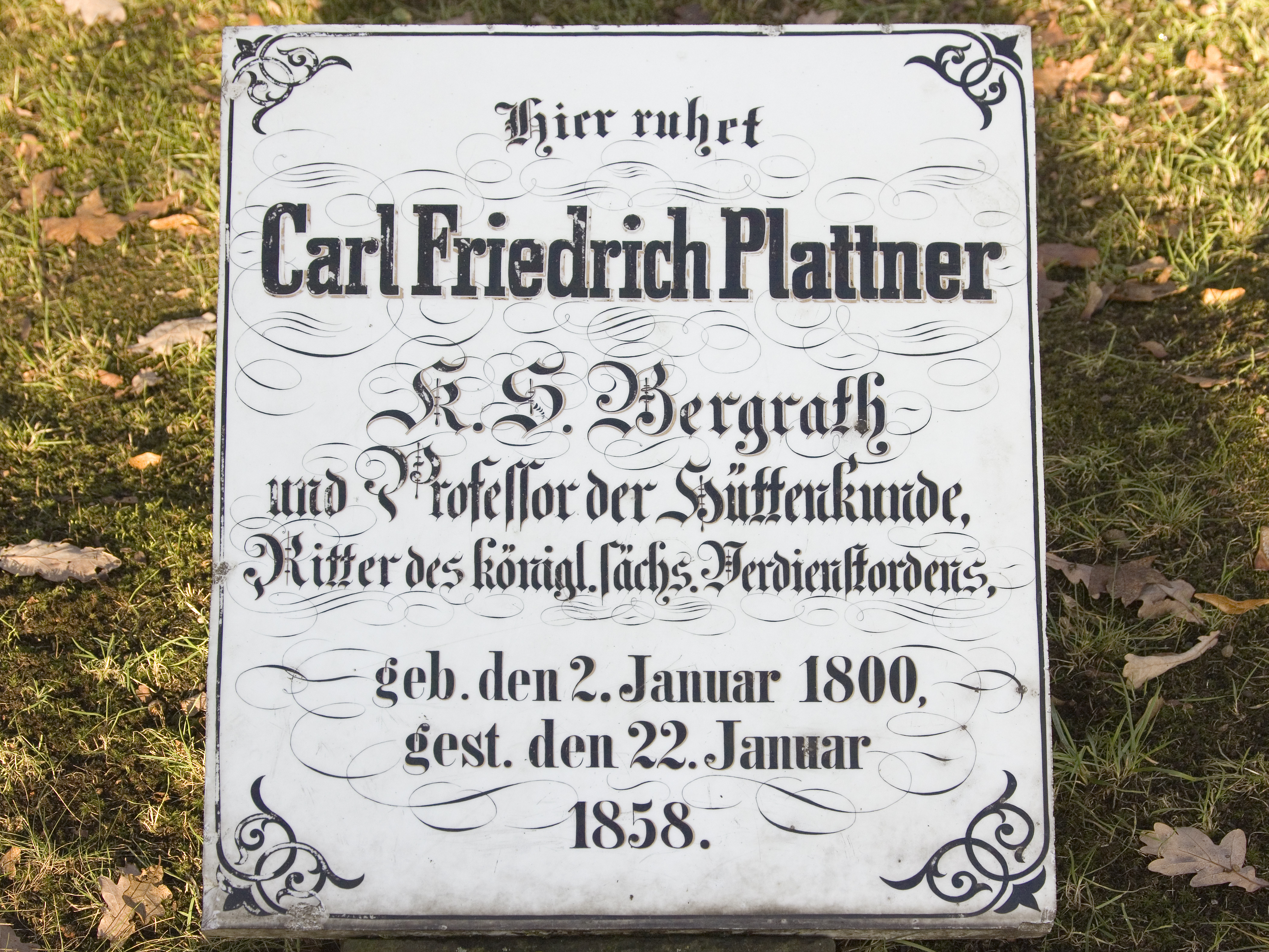
Marker on Plattner's grave in Freiberg

In 1840 he was made chief of the royal department of assaying. Two years later he was deputed to complete a course of lectures on metallurgy at the Bergakademie in place of W. A. Lampadius (1772–1842), whom he subsequently succeeded as professor. He died at Freiberg on 22 January 1858.

In addition to many memoirs on metallurgical subjects he also published Die metallurgischen Rostprocesse theoretisch betrachtet, and posthumously Vorlesungen über allgemeine Hüttenkunde.
