= Clive and Vera Ramaciotti Foundation =

Australian philanthropist

The Clive and Vera Ramaciotti Foundation is an Australian philanthropic organisation established by Clive Victor Ramaciotti (1883 — 3 August 1967), an Australian philanthropist, and his sister, Vera Ramaciotti. The Foundation was established in 1970 with an investment of $6.7 million arising from the sale of the Theatre Royal, Sydney, left to the siblings by their father Gustavo. The funds combined capital is in excess of $60 million. A Scientific Advisory Committee advises Perpetual on the grants to be awarded each year.

In 1970, when the Foundation had accumulated interest of $600,000, initial payments were made to 27 institutions. By 2008, the fund had allocated over $45 million to biomedical research supporting more than 3000 research programs; by 2020, over $61 million in funding had been allocated.

In 2024, the foundation was seen as one of the largest private contributors to Australian biomedical research. The Ramaciotti Biomedical Research Award gives out $1 million every two years for university and hospital research. The Ramaciotti Medal for Excellence ($50,000) is awarded annually, while eight Ramaciotti Health Investment Grants are also awarded each year.

== Clive Ramaciotti ==
Ramaciotti was the only son of Ada and Gustave Mario Ramaciotti, the owner of the Theatre Royal in King Street, Sydney, Australia. He was born in Ashfield and attended Newington College (1894–1900). After leaving school he worked in banking and as a stockbroker and on the death of his father he was a man of independent means. At the time of his death he left to his sister an estate of $1.7 million. Death duties were estimated to be $830,000. He was interested in bio-medical research and with his sister Vera, planned the establishment of the Clive and Vera Ramaciotti Foundation.
