= Harry Brookes Allen =

Australian pathologist (1854–1926)

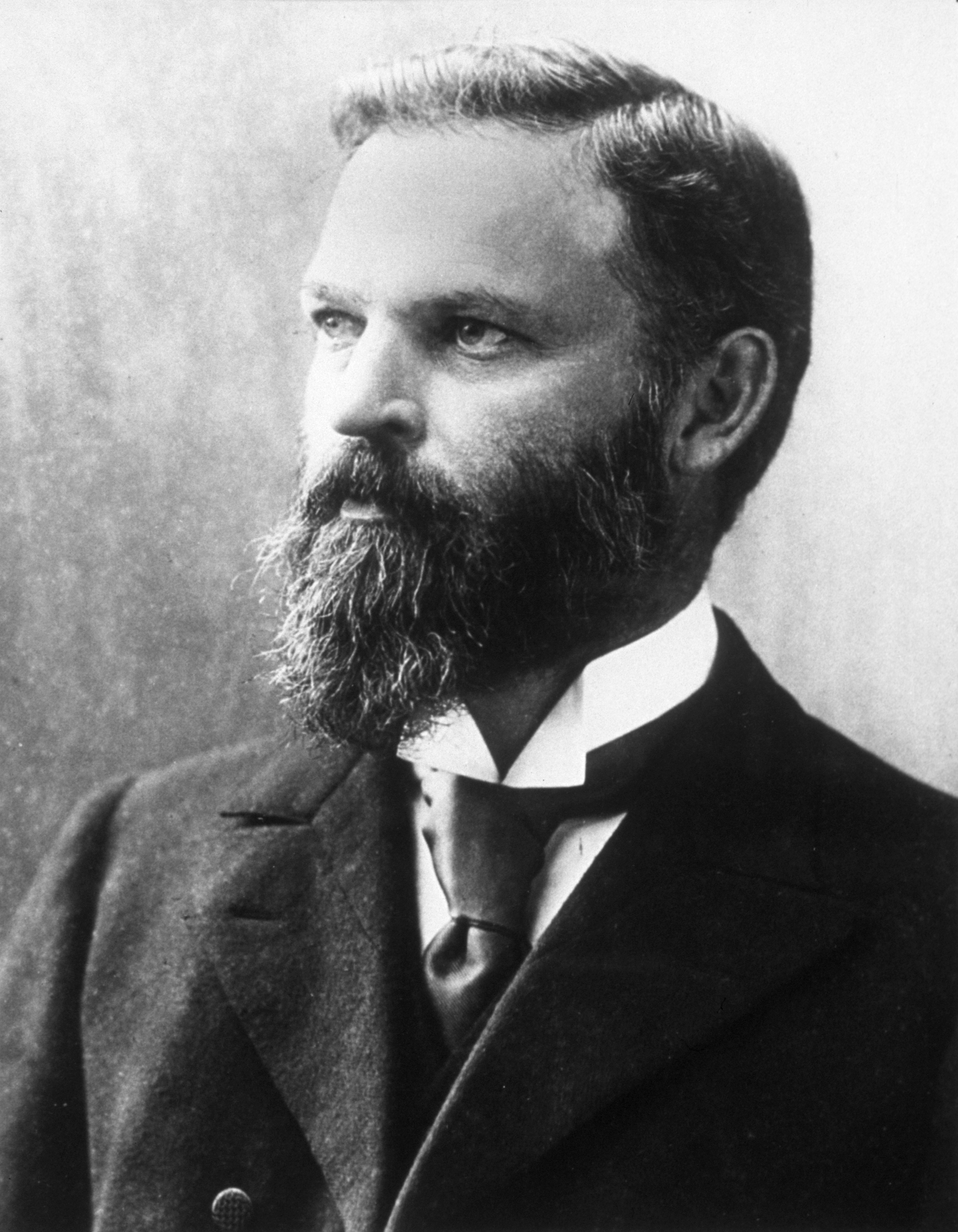
- Born: June 13, 1854; Geelong, Victoria, Australia
- Died: March 28, 1926 (aged 71); Melbourne, Victoria
- Scientific career
- Fields: Pathology, medicine

Sir Harry Brookes Allen (13 June 1854 – 28 March 1926) was an Australian pathologist. In 1891 he married Ada Mason, daughter of Henry Mason.

A portrait of Allen by E. Phillips Fox was destroyed by fire in 1952, but a replica was hung in the pathology department.

The Harry Brookes Allen Museum of Anatomy and Pathology continues to be a valuable resource for students studying medicine and related anatomical disciplines.

== See also ==
- Mennell, Philip (1892). "Allen, Harry Brookes" . The Dictionary of Australasian Biography. London: Hutchinson & Co – via Wikisource.
