= List of Hungarian Australians =

This is a list of notable Hungarian Australians.

== A–G ==
- Sir Peter Abeles (1924–1999) – businessman; awarded the Companion of the Order of Australia
- Attila Abonyi (born 1946) – soccer administrator and player for Melbourne Hungaria; member of the Australian 1974 World Cup squad in West Germany; represented Australia 61 times
- Rodney Adler – company director and former managing director of FAI Insurance
- Silvio Apponyi – sculptor and master wood-carver; art awards winner; Hungarian father
- Frank Arok – Australian soccer coach
- Suzanne Balogh – trap shooter; won gold for Australia in the 2004 Summer Olympics (Athens); won gold and bronze medals in the 2002 and 2006 Commonwealth Games; Hungarian father.
- Hajnal Ban (Hajnal Black) (born 1977) – Queensland barrister and author
- Cheryl Bart – lawyer and board member of the Australian Broadcasting Corporation
- Gregory Benko – Australian fencer at the 1972 Summer Olympics (Munich)
- Leslie Bodi (1922–2015) – foundation Professor of German and long-term head of the department (1963-1987) at Monash University
- George Bornemissza (1924–2014) – CSIRO entomologist, eponymous scientist of 20 beetles; ecologist; author of entomological publications; awarded the Order of Australia Medal (2001)
- Joe Bugner (also known as Aussie Joe) (born 1950) – Australian heavyweight boxer; two-time holder of the British and British Commonwealth heavyweight titles; three-time European heavyweight champion
- Judy Cassab (1920–2012) – painter and two-time winner of the Archibald Prize; awarded Order of the British Empire and Officer of the Order of Australia
- Laura Csortan – Australian model and television presenter. She was crowned Miss Universe Australia 1997 and represented Australia in Miss Universe 1997 and Miss World 1997. Hungarian parents.
- Claire Dan (Klára Dán) (1920–2012) – concert organiser. Principal founder of the Sydney International Piano Competition. Awarded Order of the British Empire (OBE) 1976 and Member of the Order of Australia (AM) 1986.
- Tom Danos – Victorian barrister
- Kriszta Doczy (born 1948) – film producer and distributor
- András Domahidy (1920–2012) – novelist and librarian
- Steve Doszpot – Liberal Party of Australia member for Molonglo, Australian Capital Territory Legislative Assembly; holder of three separate shadow ministries; informatics expert; former ACT General Manager of Canon Australia and Fellow of the Australian Institute of Company Directors
- Anthony Endrey (1922–2010) – Queen's Counsel, Master of the Supreme Court of Victoria; author
- Martin Fabinyi – Australian film and television producer
- Stephen Fazekas de St. Groth – microbiologist; former Professor of Microbiology, John Curtin School of Medical Research, Australian National University
- Vince Fehérvári – sprint canoeist; winner of 12 medals at International Canoe Federation World Championships (1997 to 2002) with seven gold, three silver and two bronze medals
- Peter Fritz (born 1943) – author and engineer; awarded the Member of the Order of Australia (1993)
- Ivan Gaal (born 1938) Australian filmmaker, photographer, and Olympic-recognised canoeist
- Sandor (Alexander) Gallus (1907–1996) – archeologist
- Renée Geyer (born 1953) – singer and author; Hungarian father

== H–M ==
- Ed Halmagyi (also known as Fast Ed) – chef, television presenter, author and radio host; Hungarian father
- Don Hany One of Australia's most sought after film and television actor. Winner of 2010 Logie Award. Hungarian mother.
- Charles Hegyalji (1956–1998) – Melbourne gangland criminal known as "Mad Charlie"; murdered during Melbourne's wave of gangland killings; Dino Dibra was implicated in his murder; associate of Chopper Read
- Rel Hunt (Aurel) (born 1974) – actor; Hungarian father
- Annie Jones (née Jancsó) (born 1967) – actress; winner of two Logie Awards; Hungarian parents
- Lucy Kiraly – professional model, Monash University graduate; television personality; first "barrel girl" when Tattslotto game introduced to Australian television in 1972
- George Karolyi (born 1928) – electrical engineer at the University of Adelaide and parapsychology researcher; born in Budapest
- Andrew Robert Korda – Professor of Obstetrics & Gynaecology University of Western Sydney. Legal Medicine specialist. Awarded Member of the Order of Australia (AM) Australia 2011 for service to medicine in the fields of obstetrics and gynaecology through clinical, teaching and administrative roles and to a range of professional organisations.
- George Kulcsar (born 1967) – soccer footballer; has played for Australian Institute of Sport and Canberra City clubs
- Géza Lakatos (1890–1967) – last Prime Minister of the Kingdom of Hungary (29 August 1944 – 16 October 1944); military general
- Frank Lowy – businessman and philanthropist; co-founder, with John Saunders, of the Westfield Group, a conglomerate owner of shopping centres.
- Peter Malinauskas – 47th Premier of South Australia, Labor Party MP since 2015.
- David Martin (also known as Lajos Detsényi) – writer and poet
- Andrew Mensaros (1921–1991) – Liberal Party of Australia former member of the Parliament of Western Australia and Minister in several governments
- Vili Milisits (Vilmos Milisics) (1948-2021) – baker and pastry chef; Australian pie manufacturer and exporter to Asia, Europe, the Pacific and the United States
- George Molnar (1910–1998) – cartoonist for The Sydney Morning Herald; architect; awarded Order of the British Empire (OBE) and Order of Australia (AO).
- George Molnar (1934–1999) – philosopher, with interests in metaphysics, at the University of Sydney
- Les Murray (László Ürge) – Head of Sport, Special Broadcasting Service Australia and prominent broadcaster; Member of the Order of Australia

== N–S ==
- Andrew Olexander – former Liberal Party of Australia and independent member of the Victorian Legislative Council for Silvan Province
- Desiderius Orban (1884–1986) – painter and printmaker; president of the NSW Branch of the Contemporary Art Society of Australia; awarded Order of the British Empire (OBE) in 1975
- John Orcsik (born 1945) – actor and television scriptwriter
- Jackie Orszaczky (1948–2008) – musician, arranger and record producer
- Tibor Paul (1909–1973) – conductor of the ABC Symphony Orchestra
- Elizabeth (Elly) Rab (1930–2016) – internationally recognised opera soprano, singing teacher & pianist
- Elizabeth Rakoczy – molecular ophthalmologist, awarded the Florey Medal for her human gene therapy trial to modify viruses for the treatment of wet age-related macular degeneration.
- Dianne Reilly – Australian Labor Party member of the Legislative Assembly of Queensland for Mudgeeraba (Gold Coast) 2001–2009; Hungarian mother
- Sándor Rozsnyói – steeplechase runner at the 1956 Summer Olympics (Melbourne) and athletics coach
- Roza Sage – Liberal Party of Australia member of the New South Wales Legislative Assembly for the electoral district of Blue Mountains
- Imre Salusinszky – lecturer at Yale University and the University of Melbourne; associate professor at Newcastle University; columnist of opinions and articles in The Australian
- Alex Somlyay – Liberal Party of Australia Member of the House of Representatives for Fairfax (Queensland).
- Rob Stary – Victorian criminal lawyer; represented notorious gangland criminal the late Carl Williams; also the Australian lawyer representing Julian Assange
- Lajos Steiner (1903–1975) – former chess International Master
- Miklós Szabados (1912–1962) – world champion table tennis player
- Joe Szakacs (born 1982) – Australian Labor Party Member of the South Australian Legislative Assembly for the electoral district of Cheltenham.
- George Szekeres (1911–2005) – mathematician and academic. Awarded Member of the Order of Australia (AM) in 2002. First recipient of the Australian Mathematical Society's biennial " The George Szekeres Medal " to award distinguished research scholars. Taught at University of New South Wales.
- Lauren Szigeti (born 2000) – Australian rules footballer; playing for the Sydney Swans in the AFL Women's
- Sandor Szoke (1926–1990) – competed in fencing at the 1956 Summer Olympics in Melbourne.

== T–Z ==
- Laszlo Toth (born 1940) – Australian geologist
- Patrick Veszpremi – Australian rules footballer; played in the Australian Football League for both the Western Bulldogs and the Sydney Swans
- Jason Voros (born 1976) – Australian cricketer
- Stephen Wurm (1922–2001) – internationally recognised linguist and Professor of Linguistics at Australian National University
- Charles Zentai (1921–2017) – alleged war criminal The High Court of Australia ruled on 15 August 2012 that 90-year-old Zentai cannot be extradited to Hungary because the offence of a "war crime" did not exist in Hungarian law in 1944."

== See also ==
- Hungarian Australians
- Lists of Australians
- List of Hungarians of past and present notables anywhere in the world.
