= New Australians =

Post-WWII non-British migrants to Australia

New Australians were non-British migrants to Australia who arrived in the wave of immigration following World War II. The term initially referred to newly arrived immigrants, generally refugees, who were expected to eventually become mainstream Australians. It was coined by Arthur Calwell, Australia's first Minister for Immigration, to promote the assimilation of migrants to Australia from continental Europe. Its use was intended to be positive, and to discourage use of pejorative terms such as "reffo" or "Balt" that were then in frequent use. The term has fallen into disuse since the 1970s.

The Democratic Labor Party in Victoria, under state leader Jack Little, is credited with being the first Australian political party to promote New Australian candidates in parliamentary elections in the period after the end of World War II. Prominent candidates were Hungarian-Australian Vilmos Kormos for the Australian Senate in 1958, and Italian-Australian Nino Randazzo for the electoral district of Fitzroy in the Victorian Legislative Assembly in 1964.

== See also ==
- Anglo-Celtic Australian
- White ethnic
