= Danos =

Danos is a surname. Notable people with the surname include:

- Pierre Danos (1929–2023), French rugby union player
- Tom Danos, Australian barrister
