= Photoencephalography =

Brain activity monitoring technique

Photoencephalography is an emerging, non-invasive neuroimaging technique that aims to monitor brain activity by detecting ultraweak photon emissions produced by neural tissues. These faint light signals, also known as biophotons, are generated during cellular metabolism and may reflect physiological and cognitive states of the brain. Unlike traditional neuroimaging methods such as electroencephalography (EEG) or magnetoencephalography (MEG), which measure electrical or magnetic fields, photoencephalography focuses on optical signals emitted naturally by the brain, potentially offering a novel approach to studying brain function and diagnosing neurological disorders.

== History ==
The concept of ultraweak photon emissions (UPEs) from biological systems dates back to the 1920s, when Russian biologist Alexander Gurwitsch observed that onion roots could stimulate growth in nearby roots, even when separated by glass, suggesting the presence of "mitogenic radiation." Subsequent studies confirmed that these emissions were ultraviolet (UV) light signals, later termed biophotos by German physicist Fritz-Albert Popp in the 1970s. Popp hypothesized that biophotons play a role in cellular communication and biological processes. While initially controversial due to the limitations of detection technology, advancements in sensitive photodetectors, such as photomultiplier tubes (PMTs), have enabled more robust investigations into UPEs. The term "photoencephalography" was coined in a 2025 study published in iScience, which provided the first evidence of detecting UPEs from the human brain through the skull, marking a significant step toward developing this technique as a practical neuroimaging tool.

=== First demonstration in humans ===
- A landmark 2025 study published in iScience by Casey, DiBerardino, Bonzanni, Rouleau, and Murugan examined whether human brain UPEs could be measured externally and reflect mental activity
- Twenty healthy adult participants were placed in total darkness in a controlled chamber. Photomultiplier tubes (PMTs) were positioned near the occipital and temporal regions of the skull, while a separate PMT monitored background light. Simultaneous EEG recordings captured electrical brain activity
- Participants underwent conditions including eyes‑open, eyes‑closed, and listening to auditory stimuli to induce known changes in brain rhythms (e.g. alpha waves)
- UPE signals were consistently distinguishable from background, exhibiting greater variability, higher entropy, and distinct temporal patterns under 1 Hz (i.e. slow cyclic fluctuations every 1–10 seconds), especially in the occipital region
- These emissions shifted between tasks—e.g., differing with eyes‑open versus eyes‑closed states—and correlated modestly with EEG rhythms (e.g. alpha power during eye‑closure, and some temporal lobe electrical activity during auditory stimulation)

== Mechanism ==
Ultraweak photon emissions are produced during oxidative metabolism, particularly when reactive oxygen species (ROS) in cells return to a lower energy state, releasing photons in the ultraviolet-to-visible spectrum (approximately 300–850 nm). In the brain, a highly metabolic organ, these emissions are thought to be linked to neuronal activity and oxidative processes. Unlike bioluminescence, which involves specific enzymatic reactions (e.g., luciferase in fireflies), UPEs are a byproduct of normal cellular metabolism and are extremely faint—about a million times weaker than visible light.

== See also ==
- Electroencephalography (EEG)
- Magnetoencephalography (MEG)
- Functional neuroimaging
- Biophoton
- Oxidative stress
