= List of Australian Nobel laureates =

Since 1915 there have been fifteen Australians awarded the Nobel Prize. Almost half of these prizes (eight) have been awarded in the field of Physiology or Medicine Most Australians awarded Nobel prizes before the end of the awarding of British/Imperial honours (in 1992) also received (or were offered) knighthoods.

This list includes laureates who were not born in Australia, but who nevertheless spent a significant portion of their training or career there.

In 2017, the International Campaign to Abolish Nuclear Weapons, which was launched in Australia, was awarded the Nobel Peace Prize. Alexander M. Prokhorov was a Soviet-Russian Physicist who was born in Australia.

== Australian Nobel laureates ==
Year	Image	Laureate	Field	Life	Citation
2025		Richard Robson	Chemistry	1937–	For the development of metal-organic frameworks, jointly with Susumu Kitagawa and Omar M. Yaghi
2011		Brian P. Schmidt	Physics	1967–	"for the discovery of the accelerating expansion of the Universe through observations of distant supernovae" shared with Saul Perlmutter and Adam G. Riess
2009		Elizabeth Blackburn	Physiology or Medicine	1948–	"for the discovery of how chromosomes are protected by telomeres and the enzyme telomerase" shared with Carol W. Greider and Jack W. Szostak
2005		Barry J. Marshall	Physiology or Medicine	1951–	"for their discovery of the bacterium Helicobacter pylori and its role in gastritis and peptic ulcer disease" shared with J. Robin Warren
2005		J. Robin Warren	Physiology or Medicine	1937–2024	"for their discovery of the bacterium Helicobacter pylori and its role in gastritis and peptic ulcer disease" shared with Barry J. Marshall
1996		Peter C. Doherty	Physiology or Medicine	1940–	"for their discoveries concerning the specificity of the cell mediated immune defence" shared with Rolf M. Zinkernagel
1975		Sir John Cornforth	Chemistry	1917–2013	"for his work on the stereochemistry of enzyme-catalyzed reactions" shared with Vladimir Prelog
1973		Patrick White	Literature	1912–1990	"for an epic and psychological narrative art which has introduced a new continent into literature"
1970		Sir Bernard Katz	Physiology or Medicine	1911–2003	"for their discoveries concerning the humoral transmittors in the nerve terminals and the mechanism for their storage, release and inactivation" shared with Ulf von Euler and Julius Axelrod
1964		Alexander M. Prokhorov	Physics	1916–2002	"for fundamental work in the field of quantum electronics, which has led to the construction of oscillators and amplifiers based on the maser-laser principle" shared with Charles H. Townes and Nicolay G. Basov
1963		Sir John Carew Eccles	Physiology or Medicine	1903–1997	"for their discoveries concerning the ionic mechanisms involved in excitation and inhibition in the peripheral and central portions of the nerve cell membrane" shared with Alan L. Hodgkin and Andrew F. Huxley
1960		Sir Frank Macfarlane Burnet	Physiology or Medicine	1899–1985	"for discovery of acquired immunological tolerance" shared with Peter Medawar
1945		Howard Florey	Physiology or Medicine	1898–1968	"for the discovery of penicillin and its curative effect in various infectious diseases" shared with Alexander Fleming and Ernst B. Chain
1915		Sir William Lawrence Bragg	Physics	1890–1971	"for their services in the analysis of crystal structure by means of X-rays" shared with William Henry Bragg

== Australian laureates by birthplace ==
.2
Birthplaces of Australian Nobel laureates
