= Biophoton =

Photon from a biological source

Biophotons (from the Greek βίος meaning "life" and φῶς meaning "light") are photons of light in the ultraviolet and visible light range that are produced by a biological system. They are non-thermal in origin, and the emission of biophotons is technically a type of bioluminescence, though the term "bioluminescence" is generally reserved for higher luminance systems (typically with emitted light visible to the naked eye, using biochemical means such as luciferin/luciferase). The term biophoton used in this narrow sense should not be confused with the broader field of biophotonics, which studies the general interaction of light with biological systems.

Biological tissues typically produce an observed radiant emittance in the visible and ultraviolet frequencies ranging from 10^{−17} to 10^{−23} W/cm^{2} (approximately 1–1000 photons/cm^{2}/second). This low level of light is much weaker than the visible light produced by bioluminescence, but it is detectable above the background of thermal radiation emitted by tissues at their normal temperature. Biophoton emission is also known as "ultraweak photon emission" (UPE). A 2025 imaging study found significantly higher whole-body UPE from living mice than from recently euthanized mice; in plants, higher temperature and physical injury increased emission, while chemical treatments altered it.

Detection of biophotons has been reported by several groups, and emission intensity has been investigated as an indicator of oxidative processes and physiological state. Whether biophotons facilitate cellular communication remains under investigation. Alexander Gurwitsch, who discovered the existence of biophotons, was awarded the Stalin Prize in 1941 for his work.

== Detection and measurement ==
=== Photomultipliers and cameras ===
Biophotons may be detected with photomultipliers or by means of an ultra low noise CCD camera to produce an image, using an exposure time of typically 15 minutes for plant materials. Photomultiplier tubes have been used to measure biophoton emissions from fish eggs, and some applications have measured biophotons from animals and humans. Early photomultiplier studies of light from human skin, including fingertip measurements by George Karolyi at the University of Adelaide, reported in 1990 that the emission was strongest in the red part of the spectrum and largely absent in the ultraviolet. Electron Multiplying CCD (EM-CCD) optimized for the detection of ultraweak light have also been used to detect the bioluminescence produced by yeast cells at the onset of their growth.

The typical observed radiant emittance of biological tissues in the visible and ultraviolet frequencies ranges from 10^{−17} to 10^{−23} W/cm^{2} with a photon count from a few to nearly 1000 photons per cm^{2} per second in the range of 200 nm to 800 nm.

=== Whole-animal imaging ===
In a 2025 study, four mice were imaged with a highly sensitive CCD system for one hour while alive and again shortly after euthanasia. Their bodies and the supporting stage were maintained at 37 °C (99 °F) in both conditions to reduce temperature as a confounding factor. Whole-body photon emission was significantly lower after death. The finding concerns an extremely faint biochemical emission detectable only with sensitive cameras; it is not visible to the naked eye.

=== Photoencephalography ===
Photoencephalography is an emerging technique used to track ultraweak biophoton emissions, particularly those originating from the human brain. By detecting these faint light signals, it provides a non-invasive method for studying neural activity.

== Proposed physical mechanisms ==
Chemi-excitation via oxidative stress by reactive oxygen species or catalysis by enzymes (i.e., peroxidase, lipoxygenase) is a common event in the biomolecular milieu. Such reactions can lead to the formation of triplet excited species, which release photons upon returning to a lower energy level in a process analogous to phosphorescence. That this process is a contributing factor to spontaneous biophoton emission has been indicated by studies demonstrating that biophoton emission can be increased by depleting assayed tissue of antioxidants or by addition of carbonyl derivatizing agents. Further support is provided by studies indicating that emission can be increased by addition of ROS (reactive oxygen species).

=== Plants ===
Imaging of biophotons from leaves has been used as a method for assaying R gene responses. These genes and their associated proteins are responsible for pathogen recognition and activation of defense signaling networks leading to the hypersensitive response, which is one of the mechanisms of the resistance of plants to pathogen infection. It involves the generation of reactive oxygen species (ROS), which have crucial roles in signal transduction or as toxic agents leading to cell death.

Biophotons have also been observed in the roots of stressed plants. In healthy cells, the concentration of ROS is minimized by a system of biological antioxidants. Heat shock and other stresses change the balance between oxidative stress and antioxidant activity; for example, a rapid rise in temperature can induce biophoton emission associated with ROS.

A 2025 imaging study of Arabidopsis thaliana and dwarf umbrella tree (Heptapleurum arboricola) leaves found that UPE generally increased with temperature and was stronger at injured sites than in uninjured tissue. Chemical treatments changed the emission pattern. The study presented these effects as potential indicators of plant stress, but did not establish a specific diagnostic application.

=== Hypothesized involvement in cellular communication ===
In the 1920s, the Russian embryologist Alexander Gurwitsch reported "ultraweak" photon emissions from living tissues in the UV-range of the spectrum. He named them "mitogenetic rays" because his experiments convinced him that they had a stimulating effect on cell division.

In the 1970s Fritz-Albert Popp and his research group at the University of Marburg (Germany) showed that the spectral distribution of the emission fell over a wide range of wavelengths, from 200 to 750 nm. Popp's work on the biophoton emission's statistical properties, namely the claims on its coherence, was criticised for lack of scientific rigour.

One biophoton mechanism focuses on injured cells that are under higher levels of oxidative stress, which is one source of light, and can be deemed to constitute a "distress signal" or background chemical process, but this mechanism is yet to be demonstrated. The difficulty of teasing out the effects of any supposed biophotons amid the other numerous chemical interactions between cells makes it difficult to devise a testable hypothesis. A 2010 review article discusses various published theories on this kind of signaling.

The hypothesis of cellular communication by biophotons was highly criticised for failing to explain how cells could detect photonic signals several orders of magnitude weaker than the natural background illumination.

== Applications ==
Ultraweak photon emission has been investigated as a label-free method for monitoring oxidative metabolism, pharmacological interventions, plant stress, tissue injury, and other physiological changes. Whole-animal and plant imaging studies suggest that UPE can reflect changes associated with vitality and stress, but proposed medical, agricultural, and diagnostic uses remain experimental.

== See also ==
- Chemiluminescence
- Luminophore
- Phosphorescence
