= Frank Macfarlane Burnet bibliography =

This is a list of books and monographs by Sir Frank Macfarlane Burnet, arranged thematically, with original titles, publishers and dates of publication. Burnet wrote widely on virology, immunology and later in life on popular science issues. He wrote over 500 papers and 31 books, several of which were published in multiple editions; 15 of those books followed his retirement as director of the Walter and Eliza Hall Institute.

== Virology ==
- The Use of the Developing Egg in Virus Research (Special Report No, 220), London: Medical Research Council, 1936
- Biological Aspects of Infectious Disease Cambridge: Cambridge University Press, 1940. Later editions of the book were published as The Natural History of Infectious Disease in 1953, 1962 and in 1973 with D.O. White. Published in Italian, Japanese, Spanish and German.
- With E. Clarke, Influenza: A Survey of the Last 50 years in Light of Modern Work and the Virus of Epidemic Influenza (Monograph of the Walter and Eliza Hall Institute). Melbourne: Macmillam, 1942
- Virus as Organism: evolutionary and ecological aspects of some human virus diseases. Cambridge: Harvard University Press, 1945. Published in Russian and Japanese.
- The Background of Infectious Diseases in Man. Melbourne: The Melbourne Permanent Postgraduate Committee, 1946
- With W.I.B. Beveridge The Cultivation of Viruses and Rickettsiae in the Chick Embryo, Special Report No. 256, London Medical Research Council, 1946. Also published in French
- Viruses and Man, Melbourne: Penguin Books, 1953, 2nd edition 1959. Also published in Italian.
- Principles of Animal Virology, New York: Academic Press, 1955, 2nd edition 1960. Also published in Polish and Japanese.
- Enzyme, Antigen and Virus: a Study of Macromolecular Pattern in Action, Cambridge: Cambridge University Press, 1956
- With W.M. Stanley The Viruses: Biochemical, Biological and Biophysical Properties, 3 volumes, New York:Academic Press, 1959

== Immunology ==
- With M. Freeman, A.V. Jackson and M. Lush, The Production of Antibodies: A Review and Theoretical Discussion (Monograph of the Walter and Eliza Hall Institute). Melbourne: Macmillam, 1941
- With F. Fenner, The Production of Antibodies (Monograph of the Walter and Eliza Hall Institute). Melbourne: Macmillam, 1949
- Clonal Selection Theory of Acquired Immunity, Cambridge: Cambridge University Press, 1958. Also published in Japanese.
- The Integrity of the Body: A Discussion of Modern Immunological Ideas, Cambridge, Harvard University Press, 1962. Also published in Russian, Polish, Japanese and Italian.
- With Ian R. Mackay, Autoimmune Diseases: Pathogenesis, Chemistry and Therapy, Springfield: Charles C Thomas, 1963. Also published in Spanish and Japanese.
- Cellular Immunology, 2 volumes, Melbourne: Melbourne University Press, 1969. Also published in Russian.
- Self and Not-self (book one of Cellular Immunology), Melbourne: Melbourne University Press, 1969. Also released in Japanese, German and Italian and in paperback.
- Immunological Surveillance, Oxford: Pergamon Press, 1970
- Autoimmunity and Autoimmune Disease: a Survey for Physician or Biologist, Lancaster: Medical and Technical Pub., 1972
- Immunology:readings from Scientific American with Introductions and Additional Material by F.M. Burnet, San Francisco: Freeman, 1976
- Immunology, Ageing and Cancer: Medical Aspects of Mutation and Selection, San Francisco: Freeman, 1978

== Other ==
- Biology and the Appreciation of Life, Melbourne: Sun Books, 1968. Also published in Spanish.
- Changing Patterns: an Atypical Autobiography, Melbourne: Heinemann, 1968. Also published in Japanese.
- Dominant Mammal: The Biology of Human Destiny, Melbourne: Heinemann Press, 1970. Also published in Spanish, Danish and Japanese.
- Walter and Eliza Hall Institute 1915-1965, Melbourne: Melbourne University Press, 1971
- Genes, dreams and realities, Aylesbury, Medical and Technical Pub., 1971. Also released in French, Italian and Spanish.
- Intrinsic Mutagenesis: a Genetic Approach to Ageing, Lancaster: Medical and Technical Pub., 1974
- The Biology of Ageing, Auckland: University Press, 1974
- Endurance of Life: The Implications of Genetics for Human Life, Melbourne: Melbourne University Press, 1974
- Credo and Comment: A Scientist Reflects, Melbourne: Melbourne University Press, 1979

== See also ==
- Biology Today, college-level biology textbook, contribution by Burnet
- List of publications in science
