= Macfarlane Burnet =

Australian virologist (1899–1985)

Sir Macfarlane Burnet OM AK KBE FRS FAA FRSNZ
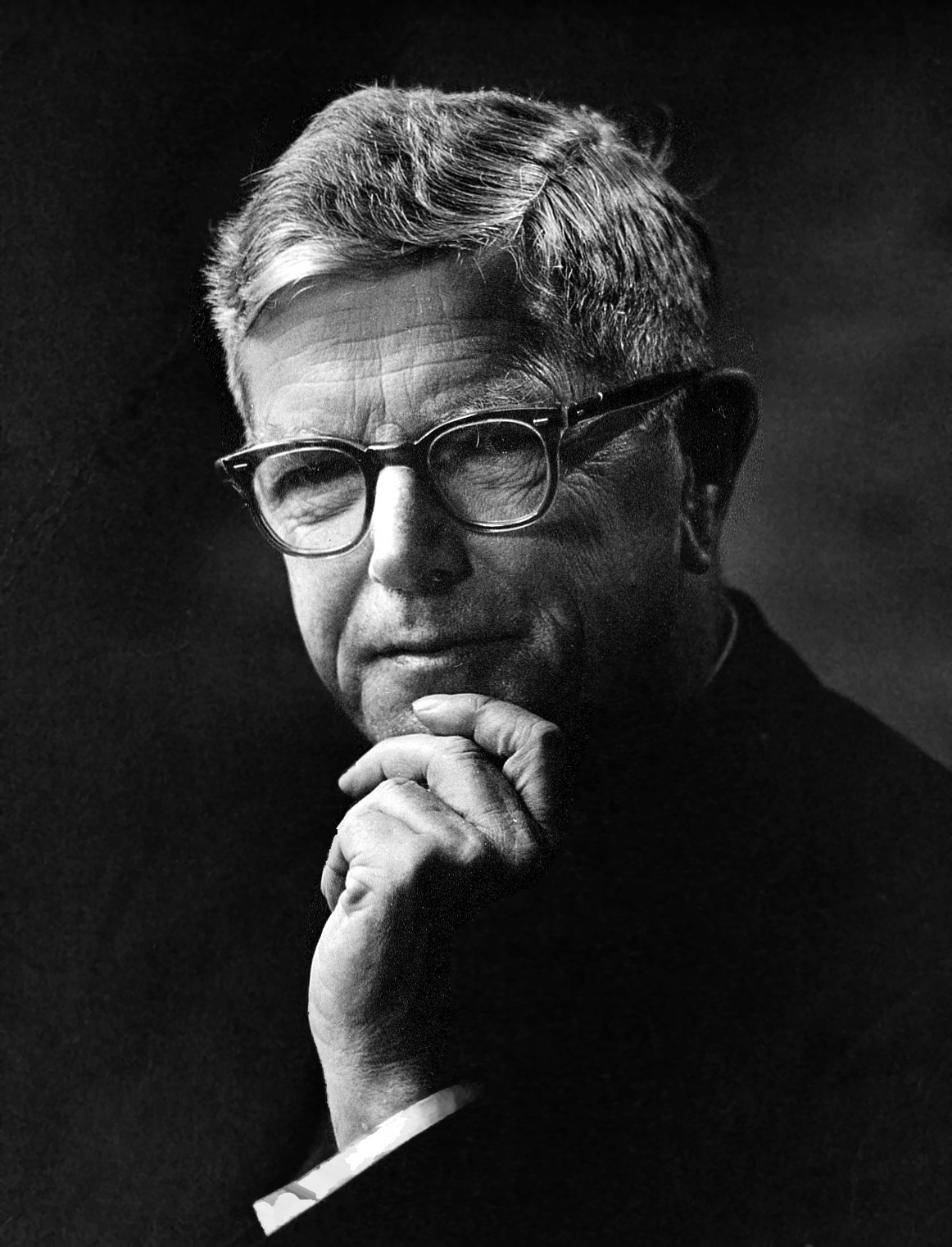
- Born: Frank Macfarlane Burnet; 3 September 1899; Traralgon, Victoria, Australia
- Died: 31 August 1985 (aged 85); Port Fairy, Victoria, Australia
- Education: University of Melbourne; University of London
- Known for: Acquired immune tolerance
- Parents: Frank Burnet (father); Hadassah Burnet (née Mackay) (mother)
- Awards: Royal Medal (1947); Albert Lasker Award (1952); James Cook Medal (1954); Copley Medal (1959); Nobel Prize in Physiology or Medicine (1960); Mueller Medal (1962)
- Scientific career
- Fields: Virology
- Doctoral advisor: John Charles Grant Ledingham

Sir Frank Macfarlane Burnet OM AK KBE FRS FAA FRSNZ (3 September 1899 – 31 August 1985), usually known as Macfarlane or Mac Burnet, was an Australian virologist known for his contributions to immunology. He won a Nobel Prize in 1960 for predicting acquired immune tolerance. He also developed the theory of clonal selection.

Burnet received his Doctor of Medicine degree from the University of Melbourne in 1924, and his PhD from the University of London in 1928. He went on to conduct pioneering research in microbiology and immunology at the Walter and Eliza Hall Institute of Medical Research, Melbourne, and served as director of the Institute from 1944 to 1965. From 1965 until his retirement in 1978, Burnet worked at the University of Melbourne. Throughout his career he played an active role in the development of public policy for the medical sciences in Australia and was a founding member of the Australian Academy of Science (AAS), and served as its president from 1965 to 1969.

Burnet's major achievements in microbiology included discovering the causative agents of Q-fever and psittacosis; developing assays for the isolation, culture and detection of influenza virus; describing the recombination of influenza strains; demonstrating that the myxomatosis virus does not cause disease in humans. Modern methods for producing influenza vaccines are still based on Burnet's work improving virus growing processes in hen's eggs.

For his contributions to Australian science, Burnet was made the first Australian of the Year in 1960, and in 1978 a Knight of the Order of Australia. He was recognised internationally for his achievements: in addition to the Nobel, he received the Lasker Award and the Royal and Copley Medal from the Royal Society, honorary doctorates, and distinguished service honours from the Commonwealth of Nations and Japan.

== Early life ==
Burnet was born in Traralgon, Victoria; his father, Frank Burnet, a Scottish emigrant to Australia, was the manager of the Traralgon branch of the Colonial Bank. His mother Hadassah Burnet (née Mackay) was the daughter of a middle-class Scottish immigrant, and met his father when Frank was working in the town of Koroit. Frank was 36, and 14 years older than Hadassah. The family was socially conservative Anglo-Saxon Protestant. Frank Macfarlane Burnet was the second of seven children and from childhood was known as "Mac". He had an older sister, two younger sisters and three younger brothers. The eldest daughter Doris had a mental disability that consumed most of Hadassah's time and the family saw Doris's condition as an unspoken stigma, discouraging the other children from inviting friends home, lest they come across the eldest daughter. From his early years in Traralgon, Mac enjoyed exploring the environment around him, particularly Traralgon Creek. He first attended a private school run by a single teacher before starting at the government primary school at the age of 7. Mac was distant from his father—who liked to spend his free time fishing and playing golf—from a young age. He preferred bookish pursuits from a young age and was not enamoured of sport, and by the age of eight was old enough to analyse his father's character; Mac disapproved of Frank and saw him as a hypocrite who espoused moral principles and put on a facade of uprightedness, while associating with businessmen of dubious ethics. Hadassah was preoccupied with Doris, so Mac developed a rather solitary personality.

The Burnets moved to Terang in 1909, when Frank was posted to be the bank manager there, having declined a post in London. Burnet was interested in the wildlife around the nearby Lake Terang; he joined the Scouts in 1910 and enjoyed all outdoor activities. While living in Terang, he began to collect beetles and study biology. He became acquainted with Charles Darwin's work by reading biology articles in the Chambers Encyclopaedia. During his early teens, the family took annual holidays to Port Fairy, where Burnet spent his time observing and recording the behaviour of the wildlife. He was educated at Terang State School and attended Sunday school at the local church, where the priest encouraged him to pursue scholastic studies and awarded him a book on ants as a reward for his academic performance. He advised Frank to invest in Mac's education and he won a full scholarship to board and study at Geelong College, one of Victoria's most exclusive private schools. Starting there in 1913, Burnet was the only boarder with a full scholarship. He did not enjoy his time there among the scions of the ruling upper class; while most of his peers were brash and sports-oriented, Burnet was bookish and not athletically inclined, and found his fellow students to be arrogant and boorish. During this period he kept his beetle-collecting and disapproval of his peers a secret and mixed with his schoolmates out of necessity. Nevertheless, his academic prowess gained him privileges, and he graduated in 1916, placing first in his school overall, and in history, English, chemistry and physics. The typical university path for a person of his social background was to pursue studies in theology, law or medicine. By this time, he was becoming disillusioned with religion and chose medicine. Due to World War I, military service was a possibility and he felt that a medical background would increase his chances of being given a non-combat post.

== Academic foundations ==
From 1918, Burnet attended the University of Melbourne, where he lived in Ormond College on a residential scholarship. There, he read more of Darwin's work and was influenced by the ideas of science and society in the writings of H. G. Wells. He enjoyed his time at university and spent much of his free time reading biology books in the library to feed his passion for scientific knowledge. He also had fleeting sporting success, holding down a position in Ormond's First VIII rowing squad for a brief period. He continued to pursue his study of beetles in private, although his classmates found out and there was no loss in this as they viewed his hobby positively. Despite an ongoing shyness, Burnet got on well with staff and students at university. Burnet was self-motivated and often skipped lectures to study at his own faster pace and pursue further knowledge in the library, and he came equal first in physics and chemistry in first year. The following year, 1918, he became increasingly immersed in laboratory work, but he was also dogged by peer pressure to enlist in the military, which he saw as a distasteful prospect. However, this was averted by the end of the war. In 1919, he was one of 12 high-performing students selected for extra tuition, and he came equal first in third year physiology. He began clinical work in the same year, but found it somewhat unpleasant as he was interested in diagnosing the patient and had little interest in showing empathy towards them.

While at university, he became an agnostic and later an aggressive atheist; he was sceptical of religious faith, which he regarded as "an effort to believe what common sense tells you isn't true." He was also disgusted by what he regarded as hypocritical conduct by religious adherents. Towards the later years of his undergraduate years, his unhappiness with religion began to dog him to a greater extent. He tried to become involved with communism for a brief period but then resolved to devote himself to scientific research. The length of time required to study medicine had been reduced to five years to train doctors faster following the outbreak of World War I, and Burnet graduated with a Bachelor of Medicine and a Bachelor of Surgery in 1922, ranking second in the final exams despite the death of his father a few weeks earlier. His fellow graduates included Ian Wark, Kate Campbell, Jean Macnamara, Rupert Willis and Roy Cameron, who became distinguished scientists in their own right.

He then did a ten-month residency at Melbourne Hospital to gain experience before going into practice. The new graduates spent four months in the medicine ward, another four in surgery, and the remaining two in casualty. In the surgery ward he worked under John Gordon and Alan Newton, both well known surgeons. He enjoyed this period immensely and was disappointed when he had to do his medicine residency. However, he was soon engrossed in his work, having been inspired by the neurologist Richard Stawell, whom Burnet came to idolise. As a result of this he became intent on a career in clinical neurology, and he wrote a theoretical paper about testing sensory losses following peripheral nerve lesions, but his submission to the Clinical Report of the Melbourne Hospital was rejected. Burnet applied to be medical registrar as part of his clinical career path, but the medical superintendent of Melbourne Hospital, who was in charge of such appointments, deemed Burnet's character and personality more suited to a laboratory research career, and asked Burnet to withdraw his application in return for the post of senior resident pathologist, which would become vacant in the following months. Burnet complied.

During the transition period he worked as a pathology registrar at the Walter and Eliza Hall Institute of Medical Research and also prepared for his Doctor of Medicine examinations, late in 1923. In 1923 he took up the post of senior resident pathologist at the Melbourne Hospital; the laboratories were a part of the Institute. He conducted research into the agglutinin reactions in typhoid fever, leading to his first scientific publications. He decided to work full-time on the antibody response in typhoid, even though he was technically supposed to pursuing pathology as part of his obligations to the hospital. Burnet came first in the Doctor of Medicine exams by a long distance, and his score was excluded from the scaling process so that the other students would not fail for being so far behind.

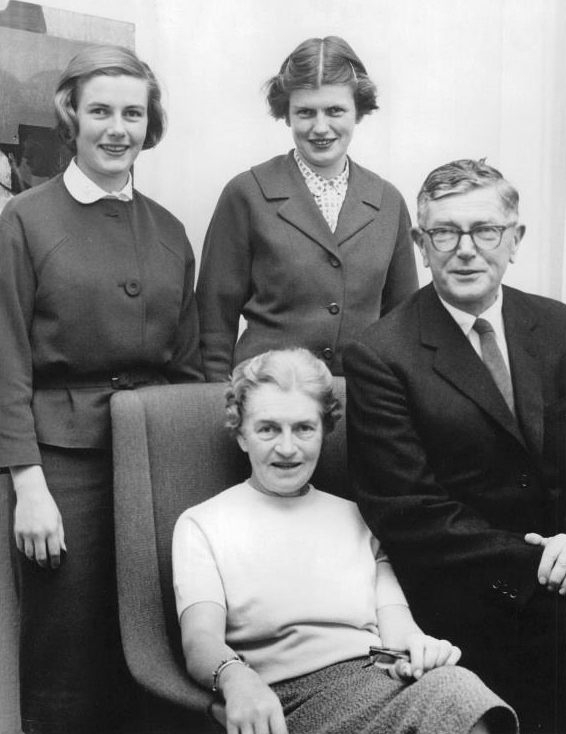
Frank Macfarlane Burnet with wife and daughters in Stockholm in 1960

At the time, the Hall Institute was in the early stages of rapid expansion. The new director of the Institute, Charles Kellaway, wanted to increase the activities of the organisation to not only support hospital operations but have separate research groups in physiology, microbiology and biochemistry that would also do independent studies. He also hoped to raise the standards to make the Institute comparable to the world-class operations in Europe and America. Kellaway took a liking to Burnet and saw him as the best young talent in the Institute with the ability to help raise it to world leading standards. However, he thought that Burnet would need experience working in a laboratory in England before he could lead his own research group on bacteriology in Australia. Burnet left Australia for England in 1925 and served as ship's surgeon during his journey in exchange for a free fare. On arrival, he took a paid position assisting the curator of the National Collection of Type Cultures at the Lister Institute in London. Burnet prepared or maintained bacteria cultures for other researchers in the morning and was free to do his own experiments in the afternoon. During the latter half of 1926, he experimented to find out the effects of bacteriophage on Salmonella typhimurium.

He was awarded the Beit Memorial Fellowship by the Lister Institute in 1926; this gave him enough money for him to resign his curator position and he began full-time research on bacteriophages. He injected mice with bacteriophage and observed their immunological reactions and believed bacteriophages to be viruses. For this work he received a Ph.D. from the University of London in 1928 under the direction of Professor J. C. G. Ledingham. The Medical Research Council invited him to write a chapter about bacteriophages for their System of Bacteriology. He was also given an invitation to deliver a paper at the Royal Society of Medicine in 1927 on the link between O-agglutinins and bacteriophage. Burnet began attending the Fabian Society functions and befriended some communists, although he refrained from joining them in overt left-wing activism. He also spent his free time enjoying theatre, engaging in amateur archaeology and cycling through continental Europe.

While in London, Burnet became engaged to fellow Australian Edith Linda Marston Druce. She was a secondary school teacher and daughter of a barrister's clerk and the pair had met in 1923 and had a few dates but did not keep in touch. Druce sought out Burnet while on a holiday in London and they quickly agreed to marriage although she had to return to Australia. They married in 1928 after he had completed his Ph.D. and returned to Australia, and had a son and two daughters. At the time, there was a vacancy for the Chair of Bacteriology at the University of London, and Ledingham was lobbying his colleagues to offer Burnet the post, but Burnet returned to Australia, partly because of Druce.

== Walter and Eliza Hall Institute ==
=== Virology and medicine ===
When Burnet returned to Australia, he went back to the Walter and Eliza Hall Institute, where he was appointed assistant director by Kellaway. His first assignment was to investigate the Bundaberg tragedy, in which 12 children had died after receiving a contaminated diphtheria vaccine. Kellaway was put in charge of a royal commission to investigate the matter and he put Burnet in charge of the laboratory investigations. Staphylococcus aureus, he discovered, had contaminated the toxin-antitoxin mixture; it had been picked up from the skin of one of the children and then transmitted to the others in the injections. However, it turned out to be another toxin that had caused the children's deaths; this work on staphylococcal toxin piqued his interest in immunology. During this time, he continued to study bacteriophages, writing 32 papers on phages between 1924 and 1937. In 1929, Burnet and his graduate assistant Margot McKie wrote a paper suggesting that bacteriophages could exist as a stable non-infectious form that multiplies with the bacterial host. Their pioneering description of lysogeny was not accepted until much later, and was crucial to the work of Max Delbrück, Alfred Hershey and Salvador Luria on the replication mechanism and genetics of viruses, for which they were awarded the 1969 Nobel Prize in Physiology or Medicine.

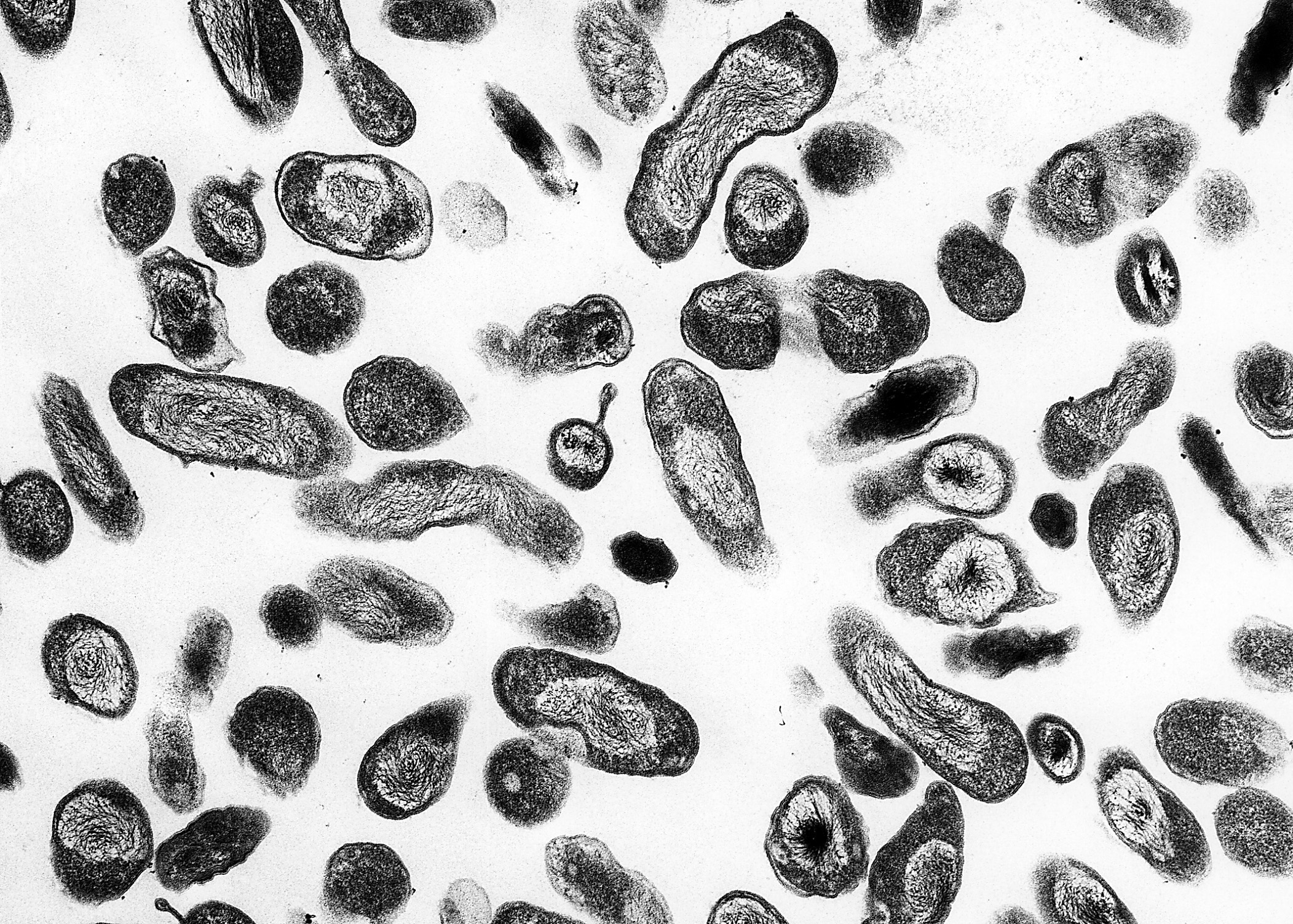
Coxiella burnetii, the causative agent of Q fever, was named after Burnet.

Between 1932 and 1933, Burnet took leave of absence to undertake a fellowship at the National Institute for Medical Research in London. The Great Depression had resulted in Burnet's salary being cut from 1000 to 750 pounds, and the National Institute had been given a large grant from the Rockefeller Foundation that allowed them to hire Burnet at 1000 pounds per annum. The National Institute's Director Sir Henry Dale gained permission from Kellaway for the two-year move; Kellaway promised to hold Burnet's job for him when he returned and felt that the experience would make Burnet—whom he saw as the Hall Institute's brightest young scientist—better equipped to expand operations when he returned to Melbourne. Dale also paid for Burnet's sister to travel to England to help look after her brother's young children.

Significant breakthroughs in virology were made while he was there, including the isolation and first demonstration of the transmission of the influenza virus. His own research was on the canarypox virus, which he used in developing a chick embryo assay for the isolation and quantification of animal viruses. Dale offered Burnet a permanent position but he declined and returned to the Hall Institute. Following his productive work in London, the Rockefeller Institute agreed to fund a new virus research laboratory in Melbourne for Burnet. He brought back a set of viruses from the National Institute to begin the basis of research in Melbourne.

When Burnet returned to Australia, he continued his work on virology, including the epidemiology of herpes simplex. He was also involved in two projects that were not viral, the characterisation of the causative agents of psittacosis and Q fever. After finding that parrots and cockatoos were infected with psittacosis and were responsible for transmission, he lobbied the government for a ban in order to prevent human infection, but he was rebuffed and later came to agree with the government position that there was not much danger. During the time he worked on Q fever with Australian scientist E.H. Derrick, the causative organism of which was named Coxiella burnetii in Burnet's honour, he became the first person to acquire the disease in the laboratory. His epidemiological studies of herpes and Q fever displayed an appreciation of the ecology of infectious disease that became a characteristic of his scientific method.

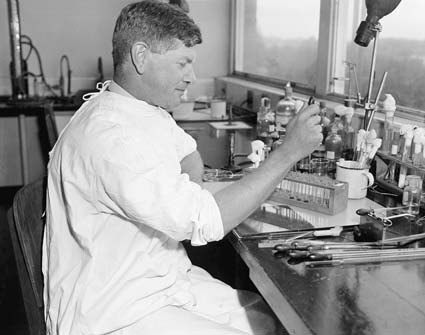
Burnet working in the laboratory in 1945

During World War II, Burnet's research moved to influenza and scrub typhus. With the outbreak of war, Burnet was handed more responsibility and made acting director and had to oversee the move into a new building as Kellaway was seconded to the military in 1939. Due to Kellaway, many of the infectious disease problems afflicting the military were referred to the Institute. Fearing a repeat of the massive global influenza outbreak that occurred after World War I, Burnet focused the Institute in the search for a vaccine. He first tested the vaccine on a group of medical students, and after a promising test on 107 army volunteers in February 1942 following a rise in infections, a large-scale program was introduced two months later to inoculate all new recruits after an influenza A outbreak. In this trial, 20,000 personnel were vaccinated, without success, and the scheme was abandoned. In 1942, the investigations into scrub typhus accelerated after an exodus of researchers in that field from Malaya after the Japanese conquest of the area. However, this ended in tragedy when his collaborator Dora Lush accidentally injected herself and then died of the infection. Nevertheless, his work on immunisation had earned him international recognition by this time.

Burnet's first book, Biological Aspects of Infectious Disease, was published in 1940. It had wide influence and was translated into several languages. In 1942 he was made a Fellow of the Royal Society, and in 1944 he travelled to Harvard University to deliver the Dunham Lectures. There he was offered a chair, but he refused and returned to Australia. This was attributed to his nationalistic tendencies, as well as his sense of loyalty to the Hall Institute. During his trip he also visited the US military facility at Fort Bragg, where he discussed his work on influenza with the scientists working there.

In 1944, he was appointed director of the Hall Institute when Kellaway was appointed director of the Wellcome Foundation. Although Kellaway had groomed Burnet to become a pivotal figure, he was hesitant as to whether Burnet would be at his most effective with a strategic leadership role. Kellaway thought that Burnet might not be suited to the post, and should have continued to focus purely on research for the time being. Burnet had similar doubts, particularly given his taciturn nature, but applied for the position anyway. Although he was not known for his social skills, his ability as a scientist and to impart ideas for investigation to his subordinates held his leadership and the Institute in good stead. Unlike his predecessor, who valued a broad gamut of research activities, Burnet was of the opinion that the Institute could not make a significant impact at global level in this way, and he pursued a policy of focusing all effort into one area at a time. Always a strong-willed and rather isolated man, he became more single-minded and less tolerant of criticism of his work and expected a more hierarchical structure and unquestioning obedience. According to biographer Sexton, he "displayed a kind of territorial protectiveness in relation to his own work".

In 1944, it was decided by the University of Melbourne that Burnet would be appointed a professor as part of a cooperative program so that university students could be experimentally trained at the Hall Institute, while the researchers engaged in some teaching. This was not a success, and there was much tension, as Burnet repeatedly expressed his opinion in public that university teaching and research should be kept separate, at one point leading to a series of open letters from university professors decrying his attitude. Burnet was also not interested in the politics of university funding, and his disengagement from administrative matters engendered resentment. On the other hand, Burnet was vigorous in obtaining funding for the Institute from government bodies, resorting to the bluff of feigning interest in moving overseas to secure continued strong backing. However, he was criticised for being thrifty and refusing to invest in cutting edge equipment, despite the Institute's high standing in research circles. Colleagues believed that he was sceptical of modern technology and thought his outlook to be limiting.

In 1946, he initiated the Clinical Research Unit to allow for closer cooperation with the clinical activities of the now named Royal Melbourne Hospital. Despite his known derisive views of clinical science as being inferior, he supported the work enthusiastically.

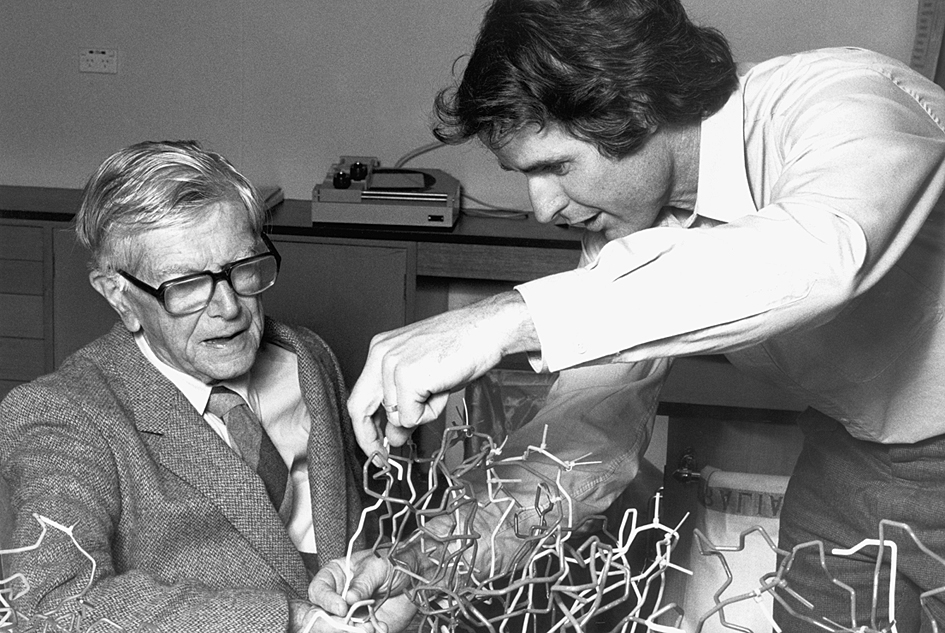
Peter Colman, Officer of the CSIRO at the Division of Protein Chemistry, showing his flu protein (neuraminidase) model to Frank Macfarlane Burnet

Under Burnet's direction, scientists at the Hall Institute made significant contributions to infectious disease research during a period that has been called the "golden age of virology". Virologists including Alick Isaacs, Gordon Ada, John Cairns, Stephen Fazekas de St. Groth, and Frank Fenner made significant contributions on Murray Valley encephalitis, myxomatosis, poliomyelitis, poxviruses, herpes and influenza.

Burnet made significant contributions to influenza research; he developed techniques to grow and study the virus, including hemagglutination assays. He worked on a live vaccine against influenza, but the vaccine was unsuccessful when tested during World War II. His interest in the influenza receptor led him to discover the neuraminidase that is secreted by Vibrio cholerae, which later provided the foundation for Alfred Gottschalk's significant work on glycoproteins and the neuraminidase substrate, sialic acid. Between 1951 and 1956, Burnet worked on the genetics of influenza. He examined the genetic control of virulence and demonstrated that the virus recombined at high frequency; this observation was not fully appreciated until several years later, when the segmented genome of influenza was demonstrated.

=== Immunology ===
Clonal selection (1) A hematopoietic stem cell undergoes differentiation and genetic rearrangement to produce (2) immature lymphocytes with many different antigen receptors. Those that bind to (3) antigens from the body's own tissues are destroyed, while the rest mature into (4) inactive lymphocytes. Most of these will never encounter a matching (5) foreign antigen, but those that do are activated and produce (6) many clones of themselves.

In 1957, Burnet decided that research at the Hall Institute should focus on immunology. Burnet reached the decision unilaterally, leaving many of the research staff disillusioned and feeling the action was arrogant; for Burnet's part he was comfortable with the decision as he thought it to be effective. Many virologists left the Institute and settled the Australian National University's John Curtin School of Medical Research. After 1957 all new staff and students at the Institute worked on immunological problems; Burnet was involved in work relating to autoimmune diseases and the graft-versus-host reaction, and increasingly in theoretical studies of immunology, immunological surveillance and cancer.

At the time, immunology was becoming more sophisticated, with the increasing role of molecular biology and biochemistry. Burnet was suspicious of the direction in which immunology was headed, and the increasing emphasis on technology and more intricate experiments, and colleagues felt that Burnet's conservative attitude was a factor in his decision to turn the Institute's focus to immunology.

Burnet began to switch his focus to immunology in the 1940s. In 1941 he wrote a monograph called "The Production of Antibodies", which was revised and reissued in 1949 with Frank Fenner as a co-author. This book is seen as a key publication in immunology—it marks the move from the study of immunology as a chemical endeavour to a biological one. Importantly in this work, he introduced the concept of "self" and "non-self" to immunology. He claimed that the interactions between an organism's immune cells and its other cells and molecules defined the organism's "self".

Using the concept of self, Burnet introduced a hypothesis about the situation where the body failed to make antibodies to its own components (autoimmunity) and by extension the idea of immune tolerance. He proposed that

if in embryonic life expendable cells from a genetically distinct race are implanted and established, no antibody response should develop against the foreign cell antigen when the animal takes on independent existence.

Burnet was, however, unable to prove this experimentally. Peter Medawar, Rupert E. Billingham and Leslie Brent did find support for Burnet's hypothesis in 1953 when they showed that splenocytes could be engrafted by intravenous infusion into mice in utero or just after birth and that when these mice matured, they could accept skin and other tissues from the donor but not from any other mouse strain. Burnet and Medawar were co-recipients of the 1960 Nobel Prize in Physiology or Medicine for this work, as it provided the experimental basis for inducing immune tolerance, thereby allowing the transplantation of solid organs. Burnet and Medawar were able to coordinate their work effectively despite their rather different personalities and physical separation; Burnet was taciturn whereas Medawar was urbane, but they greatly respected one another.

However, later studies showed that cells or tissues transplanted before the immune system development of the recipient, such as in embryonic recipients, could be treated as foreign and trigger rejection, countering Burnet's explanation for self tolerance. In contrast to the Burnet hypothesis of a special tolerance-inducing period defined by the age of the animal, Joshua Lederberg proposed in 1959, that it is the age of the lymphocyte that defines whether an antigen that is encountered will induce tolerance, with immature lymphocytes being tolerance-sensitive. Lederberg's concept is now known as central tolerance, and is widely accepted. It may also explain the success of some transplants given early in life and the failure to induce tolerance in other studies. Burnet noted that his contributions to immune tolerance were strictly theoretical:

My part in the discovery of acquired immunological tolerance was a very minor one—it was the formulation of an hypothesis that called for experiment.

Burnet was interested in how the body produces antibodies in response to antigens. The dominant idea in the literature through the 1940s was that the antigen acted as a template for antibody production, which was known as the "instructive" hypothesis. Burnet was not satisfied with this explanation, and in the second edition of "The Production of Antibodies", he and Fenner advanced an indirect template theory which proposed that each antigen could influence the genome, thus effecting the production of antibodies. In 1956 he became interested in Niels Kaj Jerne's natural selection hypothesis, which described a mechanism for immune response based on an earlier theory of Nobel-winning immunologist Paul Ehrlich. Jerne proposed that the antigen bound to an antibody by chance and, that upon binding, more antibodies to that antigen would be produced. Burnet developed a model which he named clonal selection that expanded on and improved Jerne's hypothesis.

In 1958 Gustav Nossal and Lederberg showed that one B cell always produces only one antibody, which was the first evidence for clonal selection theory. Burnet wrote further about the theory in his 1959 book The Clonal Selection Theory of Acquired Immunity. His theory predicted almost all of the key features of the immune system as we understand it today, including autoimmune disease, immune tolerance and somatic hypermutation as a mechanism in antibody production. The clonal selection theory became one of the central concepts of immunology, and Burnet regarded his contributions to the theoretical understanding of the immune system as his greatest contribution to science, writing that he and Jerne should have received the Nobel for this work. Jerne was recognised for his contributions to the conceptualisation of the immune system when he was a co-recipient of the Nobel Prize in 1984.

There is some contention over Burnet's publication of his version of the theory in the Australian Journal of Science in 1957. Some commentators argue he published in an Australian journal to fast-track his hypothesis and obtain priority for his theory over ideas that were published later that year in a paper written by David Talmage, which Burnet had read prior to its publication. In his paper Burnet cited Talmage's review, and in a later interview, Talmage said he believed that Burnet "truthfully had developed the idea before he received my paper". The theory is now sometimes known as Burnet's clonal selection theory, which overlooks the contributions of Ehrlich, Jerne, Talmage, and the contributions of Lederberg, who conceptualised the genetics of clonal selection.

Burnet's work on graft-versus-host was in collaboration with Lone Simonsen between 1960 and 1962. Simonsen had shown in 1957 that a graft-versus-host reaction occurred when the blood of an adult fowl was injected into a blood vessel of a chick embryo; this was known as the Simonsen phenomenon. Their work in this system would later help to explain passenger leukocytes in transplantation. The last project he worked on at the Hall Institute was a study with assistant Margaret Holmes of autoimmune disease in the New Zealand black mouse model; this mouse has a high incidence of spontaneous autoimmune hemolytic anemia. They looked at the inheritance of autoimmune disease, and their use of immunosuppressive drug cyclophosphamide to treat the disease influenced the use of immunosuppressive drugs in human autoimmune disease.

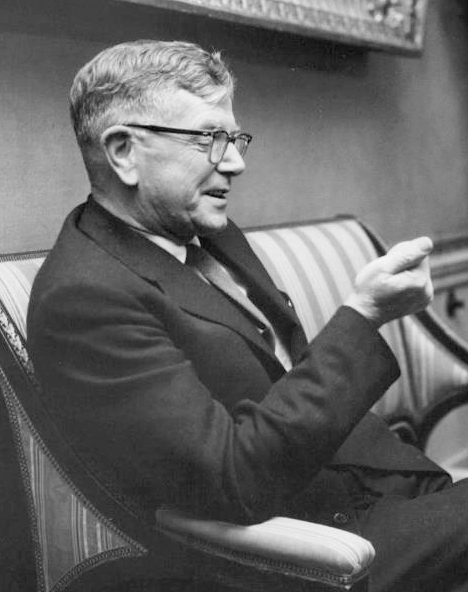
Frank Macfarlane Burnet in Stockholm in 1960

In 1960, Burnet scaled back his laboratory work, taking one day off per week to concentrate on writing. In 1963, Autoimmune Diseases: Pathogenesis, Chemistry and Therapy, which he authored with Ian Mackay, was published. He also oversaw an expansion of the Hall Institute and secured funding from the Nuffield Foundation and the state government to build two further floors in the building and take over some of the space taken up by the pathology department at the Royal Melbourne Hospital. Despite this, Burnet believed that a world class research body needed to be small enough that one person could effectively run it, and maintained tight control over its activities throughout his leadership. He determined the policies himself, and personally selected all of the research staff and students, relying on a small staff to enforce his plans.

He continued to be active in the laboratory until his retirement in 1965, although his experimental time began to decrease as the operations became increasingly focused on immunology; Burnet's work in this area had been mostly theoretical. Gustav Nossal became the next director of the Hall Institute. Under Burnet's leadership the Institute had become "probably the world's best known research centre devoted to the study of immunology." However, with the increasing sophistication in medical science and its reliance on more complicated technology, Burnet's lone-wolf approach became less compatible with the research environment, which required more collaboration. In his final years at the helm, Burnet allowed more technical modernisation during the transition period to Nossal's leadership.

== Public health and policy ==
From 1937 Burnet was involved in a variety of scientific and public policy bodies, starting with a position on a government advisory council on polio. After he became the director of the Hall Institute in 1944, he was considered a public figure and overcame shyness to become a good public speaker. He believed that it was important for scientists to cooperate with the media if they wanted the public to understand them. However, despite making many appearances on radio and television, he never became at ease with interviews and had to be selective with outreach engagements due to the many invitations he received, and tended to accept those that had the potential to promote the Institute. Over time, he began to increase his activism, as he felt more confident that he would be able to make an impact as his reputation grew, especially after winning the Nobel Prize, and even more so after his retirement from the directorship of the Institute. Although Burnet was not naturally outgoing, he saw it as the social responsibility of a scientific leader and scholar to publicly speak out and impart wisdom and foresight to the wider community.

Burnet served as a member or chairman of scientific committees, both in Australia and overseas. Between 1947 and 1953, he was a member of the National Health and Medical Research Council's Medical Research Advisory Committee. The committee advised on funding for medical research in Australia. During this same period (1947–52), he was also a member of the Commonwealth government's Defence Research and Development Policy Committee. Declassified files from this committee show that Burnet made the recommendation that Australia pursue development of chemical and biological weapons to target the food stocks of "Indonesia and other "overpopulated" countries of South-East Asia" and spread infectious diseases. (Note: Burnet wrote: "The most effective counter-offensive to threatened invasion by overpopulated Asiatic countries would be directed towards the destruction by biological or chemical means of tropical food crops and the dissemination of infectious disease capable of spreading in tropical, but not under Australian conditions".) His report was titled War from a Biological Angle. Between 1955 and 1959, he was chairman of the Australian Radiation Advisory Committee; he was concerned about the radiation exposure that Australians were receiving from medical screenings and industrial facilities.

Internationally, Burnet was a chairman of the Papua New Guinea Medical Research Advisory Committee between 1962 and 1969. At the time, Papua New Guinea was an Australian territory, and Burnet had first travelled there as his son was posted there. His role on the committee allowed him to explore his interest in human biology. He was particularly interested in kuru (laughing sickness), and lobbied the Australian government to establish the Papua New Guinea Institute of Human Biology. Burnet later helped oversee the institute's contribution to the Anglo-Australian participation in the International Biological Programme in the Field of Human Adaptability.

Burnet served as first chair for the Commonwealth Foundation (1966–69), a Commonwealth initiative to foster interaction between the member countries' elite, and he was also active in the World Health Organization, serving on the Expert Advisory Panels on Virus Diseases and on Immunology between 1952 and 1969 and the World Health Organization Medical Research Advisory Committee between 1969 and 1973.

In 1964, he was appointed to sit on the University Council of Victoria's third university La Trobe on an interim basis until the institution was formed in 1966. He served until 1970. He advocated a less hierarchical relationship between a professor and student, something seen as a move away from the English tradition prevalent in Australia towards an American model. He also called for the downgrading of the importance placed on the liberal arts. His ideas were too radical for his peers and he stepped down from the role in 1970 after none of his suggestions had made an impact.

Burnet was opposed to the use of nuclear power in Australia owing to the issues of nuclear proliferation. Feeling that nuclear power was necessary while other renewable energy sources were being developed, he later softened his stance on uranium mining in Australia. In the late 1960s and 1970s, he was also vocal in the anti-smoking movement; one of the first public figures in Australia to warn the public of smoking's risks to health, he appeared in a television advertisement criticising the ethics of tobacco advertising, and broadcasters for displaying such material. He and fellow activists were surprised that the commercial was allowed to run briefly, before being taken off air by the station, which only further generated attention for the anti-smoking campaign. A former smoker, he had rejected the habit in the 1950s after several friends died. Burnet was also a critic of the Vietnam War and called for the creation of an international police force.

== Later life ==
Following his resignation from the Walter and Eliza Hall Institute, Burnet was offered an office at the University of Melbourne in the School of Microbiology. While at the university, he wrote 13 books on a variety of topics including immunology, ageing and cancer, and human biology. He also wrote an autobiography entitled Changing Patterns: An Atypical Autobiography, which was released in 1968. In all, he wrote a further 16 books after his retirement from the Institute. He was known for his ability to write quickly, often without a final draft, and his ability to convey a message to readers from a wide spectrum of backgrounds, but he was himself sceptical that his opinions had much influence. In 1969 he published Cellular Immunology, considered his magnum opus on immunity, which attempted to show how various phenomena could be predicted by the clonal selection theory. The following year, he wrote Immunological Surveillance, which expounded his established opinion that mammals could immunise themselves through their ability to detect foreign patterns in the body. He continued to maintain an intense and focused work schedule, often shunning others to keep up a heavy writing load.

He became president of the Australian Academy of Science in 1965, having been a foundational fellow when the Academy was formed in 1954. He had been offered the presidency in 1958 to replace the inaugural head Sir Mark Oliphant, but declined, although he served on the council and as vice president in 1961–63. As president he was recognised by both government and the public as the leading scientist in Australia. His stature as a scientist gave him the gravitas to end policy disputes, and gave the Academy and its advocacy more credibility in the eyes of government and industry. As such his term was considered to be highly successful. Oliphant said that Burnet's personal prestige was very important in the increased respect the AAS won and that he "made the biological sciences far more acceptable in Australia".

He helped establish the Academy's Science and Industry Forum, which was formed in the second year of his leadership in order to improve dialogue between researchers and industrialists. It investigated whether a national science policy should be formulated and led to the eventual creation of the Australian Science and Technology Council. He also laid the foundations of the Australian Biological Resources Study. When his presidency ended in 1969, the Academy founded the Macfarlane Burnet Medal and Lecture, which is the Academy's highest award for biological sciences.

As in many of his previous pursuits, Burnet set an ambitious agenda for himself but ran into difficulties. He saw the Academy as the peak lobby group of the scientific community and their main liaison with government and industry. He tried to lift its profile and use it to persuade the political and industrial leadership to invest more in science. He also wanted to use the Academy to increase the involvement of the eminent scientists of Australia in training and motivating the next generation, but these initiatives were not successful due to a lack of concrete method. Most controversially, he tried to change the membership criteria of the Academy. He wanted to stop the Royal Society from operating in Australia and accepting new Australian members. He reasoned that the Australian Academy would not be strong if the Royal Society would be able to compete with it, and he felt that if Australian scientists were allowed to possess membership of both bodies, the more established Royal Society would make the Australian Academy look poor in comparison. Questions were raised over the existing dual members—such as Burnet—being able to maintain their status and the hypocrisy thereby entailed in Burnet's nationalistic proposal, and it was defeated heavily.

In 1966, Burnet accepted a nomination from Australia Prime Minister Sir Robert Menzies to become the inaugural chairman of the Commonwealth Foundation, a body that aimed to increase the professional interchange between the various nations of the British Commonwealth. Burnet served in the role for three years and helped start it on a path of steady growth, although he was unable to use it as a personal platform to espouse the importance of human biology.

Burnet's essays and books published in his later life caused contention within the scientific community and to the chagrin of his peers Burnet often made pessimistic proclamations about the future of science. In 1966 Burnet wrote an opinion article for The Lancet entitled "Men or Molecules?" in which he questioned the usefulness of molecular biology, arguing that it had not and would not contribute anything of use to medicine and that manipulation of the genome as had been demonstrated in bacteria would do more harm to humans than good. Gustav Nossal subsequently described Burnet as "a biologist with a love-hate affair with biochemistry, which led to a brief but damaging rejection of the worth of molecular biology."

He delivered the inaugural Oscar Mendelsohn lecture in 1971 at Monash University and advocated policies for Australia such as population control, prevention of war, long-term plans for the management of the environment and natural resources, Aboriginal land rights, socialism, recycling, advertising bans on socially harmful products, and more regulation of the environment. He angrily denounced French nuclear testing in the Pacific, and after consistently voting for the ruling Liberal Party coalition as it ruled for the past few decades, signed an open letter backing the opposition Labor Party of Gough Whitlam, which took power in 1972. However, he soon spoke out against Whitlam's lack of action against tobacco advertising and French nuclear tests. Burnet often found himself frustrated with the refusal of politicians to base policy on long-term objectives, such as the sustainability of human life.

In 1971–72, he wrote four books, most notably, Genes, Dreams and Realities, which caused great controversy due to its strident attacks on molecular biology, cellular biology, and claims that cancer and various other diseases were incurable and that it was pointless to try to do so. He also predicted that scientific progress would end soon.

Burnet spoke and wrote widely on the topic of human biology after his retirement, aiming to reach all strata of society. He courted the media as well as the scientific community, often leading to sensationalist or scientifically unrigorous report of his outspoken views. This often angered colleagues, who viewed him as abusing his stature to deliberately cause a stir. In 1966 Burnet presented the Boyer Lectures, focusing on human biology. He devised an early framework, to which the definition given in 1987 by the Brundtland Commission was extremely similar, for sustainability. In 1970 he revised an earlier book which was published as Dominant Mammal: the Biology of Human Destiny; it was followed by Endurance of Life, which was published in 1978. The books discuss aspects of human biology, a topic which Burnet wrote on extensively in his later years. In Dominant Mammal he argued that the roots of all human behaviour can be found in the behaviour of animals; in Endurance he addressed issues of ageing, life, death and the future of mankind. The books strongly polarised the scientific community, and one reviewer described his ideas of sociobiology as "extreme" and giving "a dismal, unappealing view of humanity". In Endurance of Life, he also called for society to accept euthanasia of ill older people, repeat violent criminals, and most controversially, abortion of pregnancies likely to result in disabled children, and infanticide of handicapped newborns. Knowing that there would be a strong backlash for such policies, he departed overseas for a two-month lecture series at the time of the book launch. In his absence, he was strongly assailed in newspaper letters and some correspondents compared his stance on infanticide to that of Adolf Hitler. At the same time, he also changed his stance on nuclear power and advocated its use, and the reinvestment of revenue for research into solar power. This about face angered the environmental movement.

His first wife, Edith Linda Druce, died from lymphoid leukaemia in 1973, after a four-year struggle. During her final years, Burnet refused all offers of lectures overseas to spend more time nursing his ailing wife. For a period after this he became very lethargic and reclusive, numbed by his wife's death. He then moved into Ormond College for company, and resumed beetle collecting, but for a year after her death, Burnet tried to alleviate his grief by writing mock letters to her once a week. Gradually he regained his enthusiasm and began writing again. In 1975, he travelled to California to deliver a series of lectures. In 1976 he married Hazel G. Jenkins, a widowed former singer from a business family in her 70s who was working in the microbiology department as a librarian, and moved out of Ormond College.

In 1978 Burnet decided to officially retire; in retirement he wrote two books. During this time, he missed his laboratory work, and he was constrained to social events and theorising. In 1982, Burnet was one of three contributors to Challenge to Australia, writing about genetic issues and their impact on the nation's impact. As a result of the success of the book, in early 1983, Burnet was appointed to the 70-person Australian Advisory Council of Elders to offer counsel to policymakers, but the group folded after several members became too frail or died.

Burnet continued to travel and speak, but in the early 1980s, he and his wife became increasingly hampered by illness. Having surmised his illness two years earlier, in November 1984 he underwent surgery for colorectal cancer. He made plans to resume scientific meetings, but was then taken ill again, with significant pain in his thorax and legs. Secondary lesions were found in June 1985 and declared to be inoperable and terminal. A supporter of euthanasia, Burnet was unfazed by his imminent death, and he died on 31 August at his son's home at Port Fairy after two months' of illness. He was given a state funeral by the government of Australia; many of his distinguished colleagues from the Hall Institute such as Nossal and Fenner were pall-bearers, and he was buried near his paternal grandparents after a private family service at Tower Hill cemetery in Koroit, near Port Fairy. Following his death he was honoured by the House of Representatives and Prime Minister Bob Hawke, the latter of whom moved a condolence motion, an honour typically reserved for parliamentarians. Lady Hazel Burnet died in 1990.

== Global policy ==
He was one of the signatories of the agreement to convene a convention for drafting a world constitution. As a result, for the first time in human history, a World Constituent Assembly convened to draft and adopt the Constitution for the Federation of Earth.

== Honours and legacy ==
Burnet received extensive honours for his contributions to science and public life during his lifetime. He was knighted in the 1951 New Year Honours, received the Elizabeth II Coronation Medal in 1953, and was elected appointed to the Order of Merit (OM) in the 1958 Queen's Birthday Honours. In 1960 he was the first recipient of the Australian of the Year award. He received a Gold and Silver Star from the Japanese Order of the Rising Sun in 1961. In 1962 he was awarded the Mueller Medal by the Australian and New Zealand Association for the Advancement of Science.He was appointed Knight Commander of the Order of the British Empire (KBE) in the 1969 New Year Honours, and received the Elizabeth II Jubilee Medal in 1977. In 1978 he was made a Knight of the Order of Australia (AK). He was only the fourth person to receive this honour.

He was a fellow or honorary member of 30 international Academies of Sciences and the American Philosophical Society. He received 10 honorary D.Sc. degrees from universities including Cambridge, Harvard and Oxford, an honorary M.D. degree from Hahnemann Medical College (now part of Drexel University), an honorary Doctor of Medical Science from the Medical University of South Carolina and a LL.D. degree from the University of Melbourne. Including his Nobel, he received 19 medals or awards including the Royal Medal and the Copley Medal from the Royal Society and the Albert Lasker Award for Basic Medical Research; he also received 33 international lectureships and 17 lectureships within Australia.

After his death, Australia's largest communicable diseases research institute—the Macfarlane Burnet Centre for Medical Research was renamed in his honour. The Burnet Clinical Research Unit of the Walter and Eliza Hall Institute was also named in his honour in 1986. In 1975 his work on immunology was recognised by a 33-cent stamp released by Australia Post. Seven Australian medical scientists were commemorated in the issue of a set of four Australian stamps released in 1995; he appears on the 45-cent stamp with fellow University of Melbourne graduate Jean Macnamara. He also appears on a Dominican stamp that was issued in 1997. The centenary of his birth was celebrated in Australia in 1999; a statue of him was erected in Franklin Street, Traralgon; and several events were held in his honour including the release of a new edition of his biography by Oxford University Press.

Burnet biographer Christopher Sexton suggests that Burnet's legacy is fourfold: (1) the scope and quality of his research; (2) his nationalistic attitude which led him to stay in Australia, leading to the development of science in Australia and inspiring future generations of Australian scientists; (3) his success establishing the reputation of Australian medical research worldwide; and (4) his books, essays and other writings. In spite of his sometimes controversial ideas on science and humanity, Peter C. Doherty has noted that "Burnet's reputation is secure in his achievements as an experimentalist, a theoretician and a leader of the Australian scientific community."

== See also ==
- List of books by Frank Macfarlane Burnet
- Timeline of immunology
- List of Australian Nobel Laureates
