= The Seeds of Time: The Life of Sir Macfarlane Burnet =

Book by Christopher Sexton

- Author: Christopher Sexton
- Language: English
- Subject: Frank Macfarlane Burnet
- Genre: Biography
- Publisher: Oxford University Press
- Publication date: 1991

The Seeds of Time: The Life of Sir Macfarlane Burnet is the official biography of Sir Frank Macfarlane Burnet, the Australian Nobel Prize-winning scientist, written by lawyer and biographer Christopher Sexton, and published in 1991 by Oxford University Press and revised in 1999 as Burnet: A Life, for the centenary of Burnet's birth.

Sexton wrote the book over a period of five years from archival information, interviews with Burnet's former scientific colleagues, and, notably, a series of frank, revealing interviews with Burnet himself prior to his death in 1985. Widely acclaimed and short-listed for The Age Book of the Year 1991, the work illuminates the life of one of Australia's greatest scientists and most influential thinkers. The book contains detailed bibliographic notes and a full CV for Burnet.
