= George Karolyi =

- Károlyi György
- Born: 5 April 1928; Budapest, Hungary
- Education: University of Adelaide (BE Hons, 1960)
- Known for: Early spectral measurements of light emitted by human skin; parapsychology research; animal-welfare and vegetarian advocacy
- Spouse(s): Klára Karolyi; Jolanda Karolyi (née Bódy; m. 1967; died 1994)
- Scientific career
- Fields: Electrical engineering, ultraweak photon emission, parapsychology
- Workplaces: University of Adelaide (1960–1993); Paranormal Phenomena Research Foundation, South Australia

George Karolyi (born Károlyi György, 5 April 1928) is a Hungarian-born Australian electrical engineer. He taught in the Department of Electrical (later Electrical and Electronic) Engineering at the University of Adelaide from 1960 until his retirement at the end of 1993. He is best known for photomultiplier measurements of the faint light emitted by human skin, published in 1982 and 1990, and for a long-running, partly self-funded programme of parapsychological research, summarised in his book An Excursion into the Paranormal (2003; revised 2009). He was also active in the vegetarian and animal-rights movements in South Australia.

== Early life and emigration ==
Karolyi was born in Budapest on 5 April 1928. He completed secondary qualifications in Hungary, which the University of Adelaide later accepted as grounds for matriculation. After the Second World War he was in West Germany, where he was issued a passport at Schweinfurt in August 1950. He gave his occupation as chemist ("chemician") as he carried out about a year's work as a research assistant in industrial chemistry.

He emigrated to Australia as a displaced person under the International Refugee Organization scheme. He sailed from Bremerhaven on the SS Roma and disembarked at Newcastle on 18 December 1950, bound for the Greta migrant reception and training centre in New South Wales. At time his was married to Klára Karolyi, born 18 March 1926, who arrived on the same ship. He then lived in South Brisbane. In January 1954 he moved to Adelaide, where from 1 February 1954 he worked as a labourer in the Water Supply Department's yards at Kent Town while beginning his engineering studies.

== Education ==
Karolyi applied for admission to the University of Adelaide's engineering course in 1953. In January 1954 the university ruled him eligible to matriculate in the Faculty of Engineering on the strength of his Hungarian qualifications, subject to his passing a standard English test, which he did in February 1954. He matriculated on 17 March 1954. At the end of his first year he passed Pure Mathematics I in Division I. He held a Commonwealth Scholarship from 1956 to 1959 and shared the Electricity Trust of South Australia Prize in 1959. He was admitted to the degree of Bachelor of Engineering (Electrical) with Honours in absentia on 6 April 1960.

In 1961 he was accepted as a Master of Engineering candidate in the field "Investigation of the errors involved in current power system analysis", but he withdrew his candidature in 1965.

== Academic career ==
Karolyi was appointed a demonstrator in electrical engineering in the 1960-61 period. He became a lecturer in 1961 and a senior lecturer in 1970. He spent 1968 on study leave in Europe, working with Brown Boveri in Zürich and with Siemens in West Germany. He applied for further study leave for 1975 and in 1982.

For more than a decade he was the Faculty of Engineering's time-table officer. With Jaganath Mazumdar he co-supervised Doraisamy Nandagopal's PhD on the analysis of heart sounds as a diagnostic aid. The thesis won the university's William Culross Prize in 1985. In the early 1990s he represented the university on the Hungarian subject advisory committee of the Senior Secondary Assessment Board of South Australia (SSABSA).

Students awarded a "George Karolyi Impersonation Award" at a class dinner and joked that "George's image seemed to be transparent to the camera" and alluded to his "haemological and physiological research" in the department's "subterranean corridors".

Karolyi retired at the end of 1993 and it was reported that his laboratory in the engineering building was already being dismantled and that he planned to continue his research at home.

== Research on light emission from the human body ==
Over several years before 1982, Karolyi and his co-workers D. Nandagopal and H. H. Wigg tried to detect the human "aura" or "bioplasma" with a cooled photomultiplier tube (EMI 9659, extended S20 cathode, 200–900 nm) in a double darkroom. They reported their results at the joint Society for Psychical Research centenary and Parapsychological Association convention, held at Trinity College, Cambridge, in August 1982. They found no absorption, scattering or self-luminosity in the space around the body that might correspond to an aura, down to about 10^{−17} W.

They did, however, detect weak light from the skin itself:

- Fingertips were the strongest emitters, followed by the palm and nose. Flat surfaces such as the abdomen emitted least.
- The light was concentrated between 600 and 700 nm.
- Its intensity varied with body site, over time and between subjects.
- Heated metal models of fingers showed no comparable emission, even at 100 °C, so the light was not thermal radiation and appeared to be a property of living tissue.

In 1990 Karolyi published a fuller study in Medical & Biological Engineering & Computing. It measured fingertip emission from three subjects with two independent methods: photon counting, and integration of the anode current. The tube was cooled to −25 °C inside a Faraday-cage darkroom, and filter pairs were used to resolve the spectrum into about ten bands between 200 and 900 nm. Both methods placed most of the emission in the 600–700 nm band, with almost none in the ultraviolet. Karolyi also reported that:

- Emission had both a decaying component and a steady component. In one subject the signal fell roughly exponentially, with a time constant of about 20 minutes, after the subject entered the dark. Karolyi read this as a sign that the body can absorb and store radiant energy and re-emit it in the dark.
- A blood sample gave no detectable emission.
- A subject's presence raised the background level of the darkroom, which he attributed to exhaled breath.
- The emission was one to two orders of magnitude below the threshold of the dark-adapted eye, so it could not itself explain claims that people can see an aura.

He concluded that the light came from biochemical reactions at, or just below, the surface of the skin.

=== Context and later research ===
Ultraweak photon emission from living organisms had been studied with photon-counting equipment since the 1950s and 1960s. By the early 1980s red emission from tissues had been linked to singlet oxygen and other products of oxidative metabolism. Measurements on the intact human body were still uncommon. In the same year as Karolyi's paper, R. Edwards and colleagues independently reported skin emission of about 170–600 photons s^{−1} cm^{−2}. That emission was strongest at the red end of the spectrum, absent in the ultraviolet, and varied with body site, between individuals and over time.

Later work with cooled CCD cameras confirmed several of Karolyi's observations:

- Spectral analysis of fingertip emission in 2016 put most of the light between 570 and 670 nm, peaking at about 600–650 nm.
- Whole-body imaging in 2009, after 15 minutes of dark adaptation, found strong variation between body sites and through the day.
- Karolyi said he had asked, without success, for $5,000 to compare the light emitted by normal and cancerous cells. Comparisons of this kind were later published by others, in 1992 for human tissue and in 2004 for tumours imaged in mice.
- A 2025 study found that ultraweak emission from mice almost disappeared at death even when body temperature was held at 37 °C. This is the same distinction between living tissue and inanimate objects at the same temperature that Karolyi had drawn with heated models.

A 2020 study of photon emission from neural stem cells cites Karolyi's 1990 study it in its historical introduction.

== Parapsychology ==
By his own account Karolyi spent about 25 years investigating three areas of the paranormal: survival of the mind after death, extrasensory perception (especially precognition) and psychokinesis. In his precognition tests, a subject sat in a blacked-out Faraday cage and pressed a hand-held switch to predict which of two coloured lamps would next flash in a random sequence. A subject made about 400 predictions an hour and 4,000 over a full test. He reported finding two subjects whose results were significant at the 0.01 per cent level. He also examined Kirlian photography. He concluded that its images were produced by corona discharge and had no psychic significance, and that the colours sometimes reported could be produced by mishandling colour film.

In 1976 Karolyi gave the Department of Electrical Engineering a donation to establish a fund for research into parapsychology. In about 1988 a psychic involved in a public controversy claimed to hold a certificate from Karolyi. The university placed an advertisement in The Advertiser dissociating itself from his work, although Karolyi said he had only written a letter describing her results in one experiment. He stated that he had been able to continue the work only because he had tenure.

After retiring he continued the research at the Paranormal Phenomena Research Foundation in South Australia, which had been set up specifically for that purpose. His book An Excursion into the Paranormal (2003; revised edition 2009) describes his work on the human aura, corona-discharge photography, extrasensory perception, psychokinesis, survival-related phenomena, bioelectric correlates of paranormal ability and attempts to enhance such abilities through biofeedback. Lance Storm reviewed it in the Australian Journal of Parapsychology in 2004.

== Vegetarianism and animal welfare ==
Karolyi was active in the International Vegetarian Union (IVU), to which he made a personal donation in 1975. In 1979 the IVU International Council elected him Honorary Regional Secretary for Australasia; the minutes describe him as a professional engineer. He was re-elected in 1982 and 1984 and served on the Council until 1986. He issued a regional newsletter, reported growing interest in vegetarianism and closer cooperation with animal-welfare groups, and in 1984 reported five active vegetarian and vegan societies in the region.

According to the Vegetarian and Vegan Society of South Australia, Karolyi was the first president of Animal Liberation SA. He later founded the Vegan Society of South Australia and the South Australian Federation of Animal Societies, which for many years organised the World Animals Day parade in Adelaide.

== Personal life ==
On 1 June 1967 he married Jolanda Karolyi (née Bódy) at Port Augusta. She died on 5 August 1994 and is buried at Centennial Park Cemetery, Adelaide, with her mother, Maria Labady (1898–1969).

== Selected publications ==
- Karolyi, G.; Nandagopal, D.; Wigg, H. H. (1982). "Some attempts to detect the human aura". Paper presented at the Parapsychological Association / Society for Psychical Research centenary convention, Cambridge, August 1982.
- Karolyi, G. (1990). "Determination of bioluminescence from human subjects by two different methods". Medical & Biological Engineering & Computing 28 (1): 77–84. doi:10.1007/BF02441682.
- Karolyi, George (2003). An Excursion into the Paranormal. Upper Sturt, SA: Paranormal Phenomena Research Foundation. 285 pp. ISBN 1-876087-76-5. Revised edition 2009, ISBN 978-1-921008-83-2.

== See also ==
- Biophoton
- Bioluminescence
- Chemiluminescence
- Photon counting
- Post-war immigration to Australia
- Hungarian Australians
- Animal welfare and rights in Australia
- Vegetarianism by country#Australia
