= Hungarian Australians =

Hungarian Australians ausztráliai magyarok

Total population
- Hungarian; 81,029 (by ancestry, 2021); 16,655 (by birth, 2021)

Regions with significant populations
- New South Wales: 23,577
- Victoria: 21,727
- Queensland: 9,795
- South Australia: 5,427
- Western Australia: 4,230
- ACT: 1,652
- Tasmania: 877
- Northern Territory: 331

Languages
- Australian English · Hungarian

Religion
- Roman Catholicism, Hungarian Reformed, Judaism

Related ethnic groups
- Hungarians

Hungarian Australians (Hungarian: Ausztráliai magyarok) are Australian citizens of Hungarian descent. The constant influx of Hungarian immigrants was marked by several waves. Most of the Hungarian immigrants to Australia came after World War II and after the Hungarian Revolution of 1956. Hungarian Australians mostly live in state capital cities. Responses to the 2006 ABS-conducted national census questionnaires could reflect the true numbers of Hungarian Australians only if one takes into account not only those born in Hungary. In addition to that, those of ethnic Hungarian origin born outside Hungary who officially and specifically identified themselves of Hungarian ancestry would total 67,616 Hungarian Australian persons, residents of Australia as per ABS tabulation under "Hungarian Ancestry" (Refer to Hungarian history as guide for clarification). The breakdown according to State and Territory was: NSW 23,577; VIC 21,727; QLD 9795; SA 5,427; WA 4,230; TAS 877; ACT 1,652; NT 331. Of the 67,616 total 20,166 or 29.82% were born in Hungary, 31,103 or 46% were aged 65 and over, 40,570 or 60% had tertiary or trade qualifications. In the same 2006 Census, among Hungarian-born persons, the religious affiliation was as follows: 72.9% declared Christianity, 11.8% declared no religion or atheism, 7.4% declared Judaism, 0.6% declared other religions and 6.6% did not answer the question.

Reduced in number and altered to new format, the questions in the last ABS' National Census of 2011 only allowed for and yielded the following data: 19,089 were born in Hungary; 20,875 speak in Hungarian at home including 3,861 ethnic Hungarians who speak Hungarian at home but were born in countries adjoining Hungary. An all encompassing, multigenerational total of 69,159 people claimed Hungarian ethnicity/ancestry and cultural heritage.

== History ==
People with Hungarian ancestry as a percentage of the population in Sydney divided geographically by postal area, as of the 2011 census

Generally, before and after the founding of the Australian federation, Hungarian immigration to Australia has been the result of severe politico-economic crisis in Hungary which devastated the country forcing portions of the population to a marginal existence. Revolutions, wars and the attendant misery created mass refugee-waves to the outside world. However, the exception always existed in the form of a few individuals whose highest motivation to migrate was absolute independence, divorced even from any desire to nurture root culture, heritage, language and thus seek ethnic cohesion in a far-away foreign land. They could have been typical Victorian-era goldfield prospectors, unskilled "jack of all trades-master of none" adventurers, and, at the other end of the spectrum, expert tradesman, highly educated professional or the astute merchant who saw conditions and a climate ready for the high rewards to be had for hard work invested in a fast developing new homeland.

The historic upheavals that gave rise to refugee-waves from Hungary which subsequently formed the basis of Hungarian migration into Australia:

- The Hungarian War of Independence / Revolution against the Austrian Empire (1848–49). Loss of the war and the after effects such as severe retribution and repression.
- A devastating depression in rural Hungary in the 1890s and early 1900s saw over 1.5 million Hungarians emigrate. While the overwhelming majority went to the United States, several hundred came to Australia.
- The collapse of the Austro-Hungarian Empire upon loss of World War I (1918) and the Treaty of Versailles-Trianon (1920) reduced the size of Hungary, resulting in a 72% loss in territory. This left 6.6 million Hungarians living not in their own country Hungary but in Austria, Czechoslovakia, Ukraine (USSR), Romania and in the Kingdom of Serbs, Croats and Slovenes as an ethnic minority.
- An ongoing repression since 1920 against Hungarian ethnic minorities in some of the above countries adjoining Hungary gave rise to migration to Australia from Serbia and Croatia (former Yugoslavia), Romania, Slovakia (part of former Czechoslovakia). This is not described as a wave but rather as a consistent and steady stream of Hungarian migration by families and individuals from those sources. Also, before the outbreak of World War II, Australia accepted some 6,475 new settlers consisting mainly of Central European Jewry fleeing Nazi Germany's discrimination and threats. The number of Hungarians among them is estimated to be about 800.
- World War II, physical devastation, economic collapse and gradual takeover by a communist dictatorship in Hungary. Australia welcomed about 15,000 refugees officially termed Displaced Persons recruited from the International Refugee Organization's refugee camps, mainly in Austria.
- The Hungarian Revolution of 1956 against Soviet occupation was crushed by Soviet troops reoccupying the country. Once more Australia welcomed about 14,500 migrants following a mass exodus of 200,000 Hungarians from their own country.

Although the main stream was always from Hungary, whenever possible, Hungarians from the adjoining successor state countries (post-Trianon 1920 newly independent States) also migrated to Australia.

According to records, the very first Hungarian to arrive in Australia was the merchant Isaac Friedman in 1833. He left London on his way to Sydney with his wife and son, passengers on the ship "Enchanteress". His first step on Australian soil was during a stopover in Hobart, a city which impressed them. After about five years, the family returned to and settled in Hobart.

== Hungarian Australians ==
- List of Hungarian Australians. See list of 271 names as at 18 January 2016.

== See also ==
- List of Hungarian Australians
- Australia–Hungary relations
- Hungarian people
- Hungarian diaspora
- European Australians
