= Anthony Endrey =

Hungarian-Australian lawyer and author

Anthony Endrey (1922–2010) was a Hungarian-Australian lawyer and author. He was a Queen's Counsel and Master of the Supreme Court in Victoria, Australia, and a member of the Victorian Bar.

Endrey was born in Hungary, and graduated Doctor of Law from the University of Budapest. He was a research assistant at Friedricks-Wilhelm University in Berlin. He served in the Royal Hungarian Army during World War II, and was a prisoner of war in the Soviet Union until his release in 1945. He emigrated to Australia in 1949, and in order to practice in Australia he studied law at the University of Tasmania.

Endrey held a number of positions within the Hungarian community in Australia. He served as President of the Federal Council of Hungarian Associations of Australia and New Zealand, the Hungarian Cultural Council and the Council of the Hungarian Institute in Melbourne. He was a published author on Hungarian subjects in Australia. He returned to Hungary in 1982 where he resumed the practice of law.

== Bibliography ==
- The Future of Hungary. (1972). Melbourne, Hawthorn Press. ISBN 0-7256-0088-8 :
- Sons of Nimrod : the origin of Hungarians. (1975). Melbourne, Hawthorn Press. ISBN 0-7256-0130-2
- The Kingdom to Come. (1976). Melbourne, Hawthorn Press. ISBN 0725601744
- The Holy Crown of Hungary. (1977). Melbourne, Hungarian Institute.ISBN 0959697209
- Hungarian history. Part 1. (1978). Melbourne, Hungarian Institute. ISBN 0-9596972-2-5
- Hungarian history. Part 2. From 1301 to 1686. (1980). Melbourne, Hungarian Institute. ISBN 0-9596972-3-3
- The Robber Banks of Wall Street. (2002). Hódmezővásárhely, Carpathian Press, Szoliter Kft.
