= Stephen Fazekas de St. Groth =

Hungarian-Australian microbiologist

Stephen Nicholas Emery Egon Fazekas de St Groth (15 September 1919 – 10 October 2006) was a Hungarian-Australian microbiologist. He completed his education in Hungary and moved to Australia in the 1950s where he researched with Frank Macfarlane Burnet at the Walter and Eliza Hall Institute of Medical Research in Melbourne, and later at the John Curtin School of Medical Research and CSIRO in Canberra.
