= Kriszta Doczy =

Hungarian-Australian film producer

Kriszta Doczy (born 9 October 1949), formerly Krisztina Bodonyi, is a Hungarian born Australian film producer and founder of Contemporary Arts Media, a distributor of art films.

== Career ==
Doczy worked with experimental theatre companies in Europe from the age of 17 to 30. She has worked as movement director and choreographer with theatre and dance companies and has taught at universities and performing arts schools in Australia and at City University of New York in the United States. She launched her theatre company, Shadow Industries (1996–1999), with a theatre adaptation of Peter Carey's short stories "Do You Love Me" and "Peeling". She founded a physical theatre training school (1993–1999), and collaborated with actors from Australia and the UK. Her physical theatre adaptation of The Trial by Franz Kafka toured in New York, Singapore, Australia, and South Korea. In 2000, she established a film production/distribution company, Contemporary Arts Media (1996–present), which is recognised as a significant company for developing Australian artists' work.

Doczy now works as managing director of Contemporary Arts Media, based in Melbourne, Australia. She has collaborated with a number of Australian and international artists and producers, including Stelarc, Richard Foreman, Sarah Jane Pell, Chunky Move, and Kartemquin Films.
