= Fritz-Albert Popp =

German biophysicist (1938–2018)

- Born: Fritz-Albert Popp; 11 May 1938; Frankfurt am Main, Germany
- Died: 4 August 2018 (aged 80)
- Citizenship: Germany
- Known for: Biophoton emissions
- Scientific career
- Fields: Biophysics
- Institutions: University of Marburg; University of Kaiserslautern; Biophotonik company International Institute of Biophysics – Neuss

Fritz-Albert Popp (11 May 1938 – 4 August 2018) was a German researcher in biophysics, particularly in the study of biophotons.

== Biography ==
Popp was born in 1938 in Frankfurt. He has a diploma in Experimental Physics (1966, University Würzburg), a Ph.D. in Theoretical Physics (1969, University Mainz), and a habilitation in Biophysics and Medicine (1973, University Marburg). He was awarded Professorship (H2) by the Senate of Marburg University, and lectured at Marburg University from 1973 to 1980.

In the mid-1970s, Popp rediscovered and made the first extensive physical analysis of biophotons (they were originally discovered in 1922).

He was head of a research group in the pharmaceutical industry in Worms from 1981 to 1983 and head of a research group at the Institute of Cell Biology (University of Kaiserslautern) from 1983 to 1986 and of another research group at the Technology Center in Kaiserslautern. Popp became an Invited Member and of the New York Academy of Sciences and an Invited Foreign Member of the Russian Academy of Natural Sciences (RANS).

Popp is the founder of the International Institute of Biophysics in Neuss (1996), Germany, an international network of 19 research groups from 13 countries involved in biophoton research and coherence systems in biology.

- Google Scholar, h-index 43 (As of 2022)
- Scopus, h index 22 (As of 2022)
