= Jason Voros =

Australian cricketer

Personal information
- Full name: Jason Alexander Voros
- Born: 31 December 1976 (age 49); Canberra, Australian Capital Territory
- Batting: Left-handed
- Bowling: Left-arm fast-medium
- Role: Bowler

Domestic team information
- Years: Team
- 1998/99: Canberra Comets
- 2004: Sussex
- LA debut: 31 October 1998 Canberra Comets v New South Wales
- Last LA: 19 June 2004 Sussex v West Indians
- Only FC: 12 May 2004 Sussex v Loughborough UCCE

Career statistics
Competition	FC	LA
Matches	1	7
Runs scored	3	15
Batting average	–	15
100s/50s	0/0	0/0
Top score	3*	11*
Balls bowled	125	354
Wickets	5	9
Bowling average	12.40	25.88
5 wickets in innings	0	0
10 wickets in match	0	0
Best bowling	4/40	3/28
Catches/stumpings	0/0	2/0
- Source: CricketArchive, 29 July 2013

Jason Alexander Voros (born 31 December 1976) is an Australian first class cricketer. A left-arm fast-medium bowler, he played one day cricket with the Canberra Comets in 1998–99.

Voros was signed by Sussex in 2004, qualifying as a non-overseas player as his parents are Hungarian. He played just one first class game, against Loughborough University Centre of Cricketing Excellence. He took 4 for 40 in his first innings and added another victim in his second.

Voros currently works as an International Travel Consultant for Escape Travel on Qld's Sunshine Coast
