= Elizabeth (Elly) Rab =

Elizabeth Rab (3 September 1930 – 7 June 2016), also known as Rab Elly, was a Hungarian-born Australian internationally acclaimed opera soprano and music teacher (singing and piano). She was a member of the Hungarian State Opera (Budapest) from 1948 to 1960 and during that time, she held the number two position as Opera Soprano.

== Early life ==
Elizabeth Rab was born in Budapest, Hungary on 3 September 1930.

== Singing career in Hungary ==
During the 1950s, Elly Rab was a professional opera singer in Hungary. In November 1961, as the soprano of the Hungarian Opera House, she joined the Hungarian Gypsy Orchestra on their international tour, which undertook an Australian tour starting in Melbourne.

== Singing career in Australia ==
By 1962 Rab relocated to Australia, where she performed and eventually became a music teacher. The Hungarian University Students Dancing Group performed in October 1972 at the Black Swan Bazaar with Rab providing operatic singing. In 1985 she established an academy in Sydney where she taught singing.

== Death ==
Rab died in Sydney on 7 June 2016, at the age of 85.
