= Tom Danos =

Australian barrister

Tom Danos is a high-profile barrister in Victoria, Australia. He mainly practices in the area of criminal law, and is Treasurer of the Victorian Criminal Bar Association. Danos is a trustee member of the Maccabi World Union Board. He represented Australian athletes who were injured in the Maccabiah bridge collapse in Israel in 1997. He also represented John Patrick Ford, a convicted man who gave evidence in the trial of alleged drug courier Schapelle Corby in Indonesia.

Danos successfully represented Julian Michael Clarke before the Victorian Court of Appeal in 2005. Clarke's conviction at a first trial before the Supreme Court of Victoria in 2004 for the murder of Melbourne solicitor Keith William Allan, together with co-accused Sudo Cavkic and Costas Athanasi, was annulled, and a re-trial ordered. Argument by Danos in relation to the definition of reasonable doubt, that the jury should have been told by the trial judge that it should not be construed as a percentage, was accepted by the Court of Appeal. This judgment of the Court of Appeal created an important precedent in Australian law.

Danos represented Clarke subsequently at the second trial in 2006 and third trial in 2007. The second trial resulted in a hung jury, but Clarke, together with his two other co-accused, were convicted at the third trial.
