= July 1919 =

Month in 1919

<<	July 1919					>>
Su	Mo	Tu	We	Th	Fr	Sa
		1	2	3	4	5
6	7	8	9	10	11	12
13	14	15	16	17	18	19
20	21	22	23	24	25	26
27	28	29	30	31

The following events occurred in July 1919:

Mustafa Kemal Atatürk, leader of the Turkish National Movement, and eventually first President of Turkey

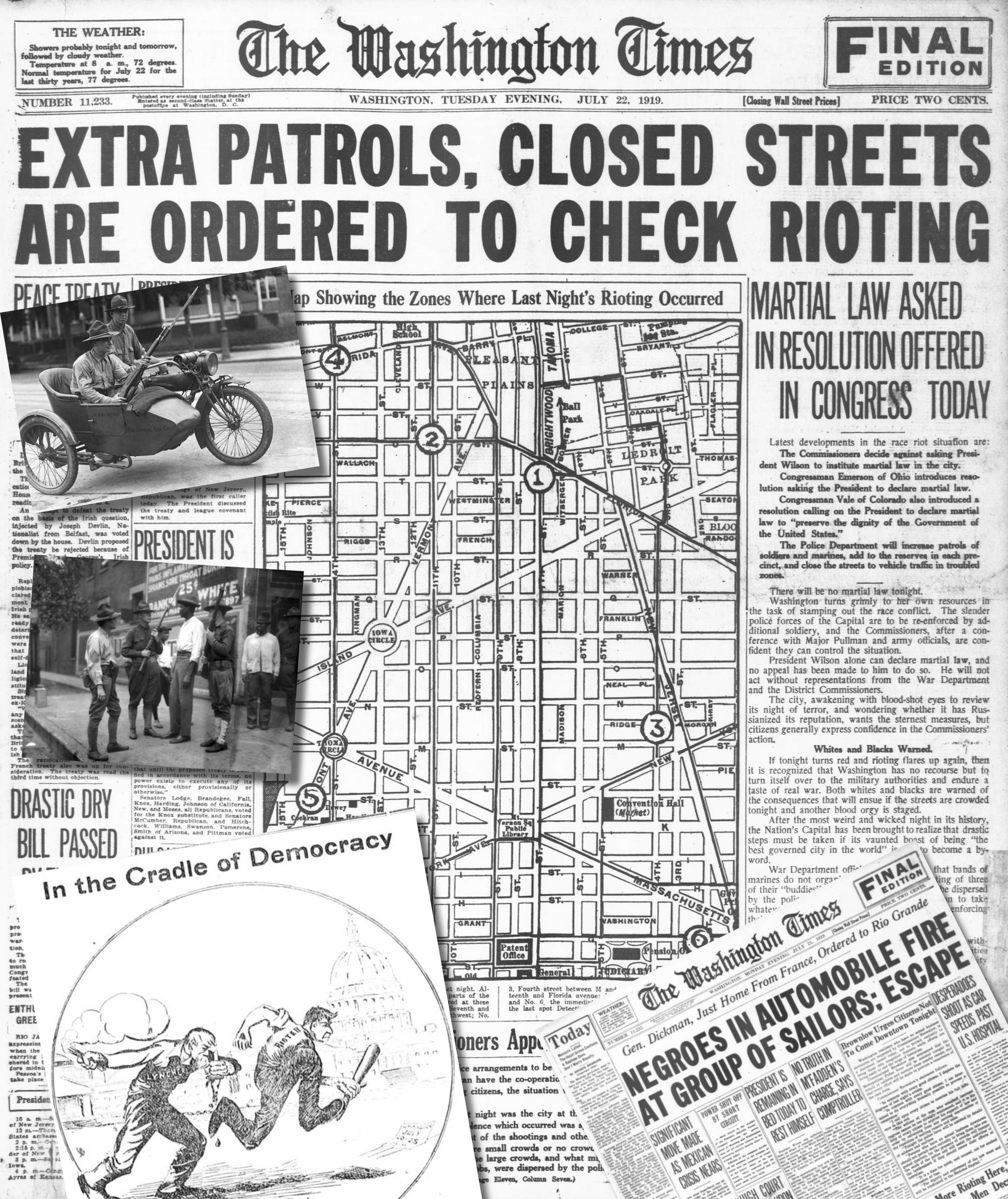
Washington Times covering riots in Washington, D.C. during the height of nation-wide racial unrest that became known at the "Red Summer".

== July 1, 1919 (Tuesday) ==
- The General Conference of Seventh-day Adventists of the United States led by A. G. Daniells held a month long Bible Conference to discuss and reach decisions on scripture, including the inspiration of Ellen G. White, co-founder of the Seventh-day Adventist Church who died in 1915.
- The city government of Edinburgh took over the city's private tramway system, eventually leading to the formation of Lothian Buses.
- Newport News Shipbuilding established The Apprentice School in Newport News, Virginia to offer apprenticeship programs for students interested in pursuing a career in shipbuilding.
- Several rail stations were reopened in Great Britain after being closed down during World War I, including stations in London Fields, and Leman Street in England, and Star Crossing in Wales. At the same time, the London Overground closed the stations of Southbury, Theobalds Grove and Turkey Street which had been opened in 1915 to transport munitions during World War I.
- New rail stations were added to serve the North Coast railway line in New South Wales, Australia, including Eungai and Macksville. Opposite the station lies a passing loop.
- The football club Scheveningen was established in Scheveningen, Netherlands.
- The city of Alcoa, Tennessee was established.
- Hol Municipality and Langenes Municipality (Norway) were established.
- Born:
  - Mikhail Shultz, Russian chemist, known for his research into electrochemistry of glass, recipient of the Order of Lenin; in Petrograd, Russian SFSR (present-day Saint Petersburg, Russia (d. 2006)
  - Arnold Meri, Estonian army officer, known for his involvement in Operation Priboi; in Tallinn, Estonia (d. 2009)
- Died: John Brunner, 77, British industrialist, co-founder of chemical manufacturer Brunner Mond & Co. (b. 1842)

== July 2, 1919 (Wednesday) ==
- Iowa ratified the Nineteenth Amendment to the United States Constitution which gave women the right to vote.
- British airship R34 departed from East Fortune, Scotland in an attempt to make the first transatlantic flight by dirigible, and the first westbound flight, to Mineola, New York.
- U.S. Navy blimp C-8 exploded while landing at Camp Holabird, Maryland, injuring around 80 adults and children who were watching it and shattering windows in homes a mile away.
- The 2nd Special Squadron of the Imperial Japanese Navy was disbanded.
- The 41st Aero Squadron of the United States Army Air Service was disbanded.
- Lieutenant Colonel Charles W. Whittlesey starred as himself in the film The Lost Battalion, which recreated his experiences with the 308th Infantry Regiment when the unit was cut off from the rest of the 77th Infantry Division during the Meuse–Argonne offensive in October 1918. Directed by Burton L. King, the film also starred Major-General Robert Alexander, Whittlesey's real-life superior, and George G. McMurtry who was the unit's captain during the battle.
- Born: Jean Craighead George, American children's writer, author of Julie of the Wolves and My Side of the Mountain; in Washington, D.C., United States (d. 2012)
- Died:
  - Friedrich Soennecken, 70, German inventor, developed office tools including the hole punch and ringbinder, founder of Soennecken (b. 1848)
  - Anna Howard Shaw, 72, American activist, leading member of the National Woman Suffrage Association; died of pneumonia (b. 1847)

== July 3, 1919 (Thursday) ==
- A cease-fire was called between Germany, Latvia and Estonia. German forces were ordered to leave Latvia and the pro-German Baltische Landeswehr was put under the authority of the Latvian government, effectively ending both the Estonian and Latvian Wars of Independence (although fighting continued against Soviet Russia). As part of the ceasefire's terms, pro-German Prime Minister of Latvia Andrievs Niedra resigned and Latvian forces were allowed to occupy Riga on July 8.
- Russian Civil War – General Anton Denikin of the White armies in Tsaritsyn issued a directive for an army of 70,000 White troops positioned on the Southern Front of the Russian Civil War to push north and attack the main Bolshevik stronghold in Moscow.
- Missouri ratified the Nineteenth Amendment to the U.S. Constitution.
- Red Summer – A riot broke out in Bisbee, Arizona when local police attempted to disarm members of the all-black 10th U.S. Cavalry (better known as the "Buffalo Soldiers") who were in town to march in the Fourth of July military parade the following day. The hour-long street battle resulted in eight injuries, including the shooting of four soldiers, but no deaths. The United States Army did not formally charge the soldiers for rioting, believing local police harassment resulted in the riot, and allowed the unit to march the following day.
- American envoys Arthur E. Sutherland Jr. and Captain Emory H. Niles of the United States Army began an investigation around Van, Turkey to determine the extent of the Armenian genocide in 1915, eventually releasing findings in a report to Congress along with a report by the Harbord Commission that covered regions outside of Van.
- The Helical Bar and Engineering Company was established as a steel construction company in London. It sold its steel reinforcement business in 1986 and became property developer Helical plc.
- The British-Israel-World Federation was established in London to promote British Israelism, or the belief the British people and its nobility were direct descendants of one of the Ten Lost Tribes of Israel (disproved by most biblical historians).
- Died:
  - Thomas Millie Dow, 70, Scottish artist, member of the Glasgow Boys (b. 1848)
  - William MacGregor, 72, British-Australian politician, 11th Governor of Queensland, 60th Governor of Newfoundland (b. 1846)

== July 4, 1919 (Friday) ==
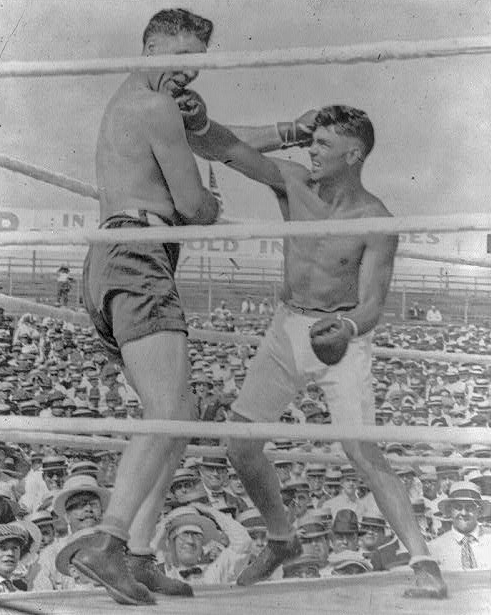
Defending heavyweight champion Jess Willard (left) takes a punch from Jack Dempsey (right) who wins the Toledo, Ohio match and takes the world title.

- Ibn Saud, ruler of the Emirate of Nejd and Hasa, submitted to a British ultimatum to stand down from taking the Kingdom of Hejaz (now Saudi Arabia), ending the conflict between the two Arab kingdoms that been ongoing for about a year.
- Food riots and strikes broke out in Romagna and Bologna and soon spread throughout Italy to Milan, Genoa, Livorno, Pisa, Florence, Palermo and other cities. The violence left several people dead, and shopkeepers slashed food prices by as much as 50% to 70% to discourage rioting.
- José Pardo y Barreda was ousted as President of Peru by Augusto B. Leguía, who remained head of state for over a decade before being overthrown in 1930.
- Women in British Rhodesia who were the age of 21 or older were allowed to vote and run for office, provided they met specific occupational and salary qualifications.
- The 57th Infantry Division of the British Army was disbanded.
- The Royal Air Force disbanded squadron No. 38 at RAF Hawkinge, Folkestone, England.
- The 73rd Aero Squadron of the United States Army Air Service was disbanded at Hazelhurst Field, Mineola, New York.
- Jack Dempsey became World Heavyweight Champion by stopping Jess Willard, the defending champion, after three rounds during their match in Toledo, Ohio.
- British news magazine The Guardian Weekly began publication in London as one of the first newspapers intended to have an international reach.

== July 5, 1919 (Saturday) ==
- The Hellenic Coast Guard was established to protect the coastlines of Greece.
- The Royal Air Force disbanded squadron No. 273 at Great Yarmouth, England.
- Bella Wright of Leicestershire, England was murdered with a single gunshot to the face. Previous to her murder, witnesses saw her riding with a man on a green bicycle, resulting in the press calling the murder investigation the Green Bicycle Case. Ronald Light, a mathematics teacher, became the prime suspect in the case but was acquitted of murder during his trial after defense lawyer Edward Marshall Hall convinced the jury Wright's death had been the result of an accidental shooting.
- The General German Trade Union Federation was established in Nuremberg as the first postwar congress of trade unions in Germany, with labor leader Carl Legien the first chairperson. It replaced the General Commission of German Trade Unions that operated before the war.
- Born: Bep Voskuijl, Dutch administrator, secretary for Otto Frank, father of Anne Frank, and member of the Voskuijl family that hid the Frank family during World War II; as Elisabeth Voskuijl, in Amsterdam, Netherlands (d. 1983)
- Died: Eugen Leviné, 36, German revolutionary, president of the Bavarian Soviet Republic; executed (b. 1883)

== July 6, 1919 (Sunday) ==
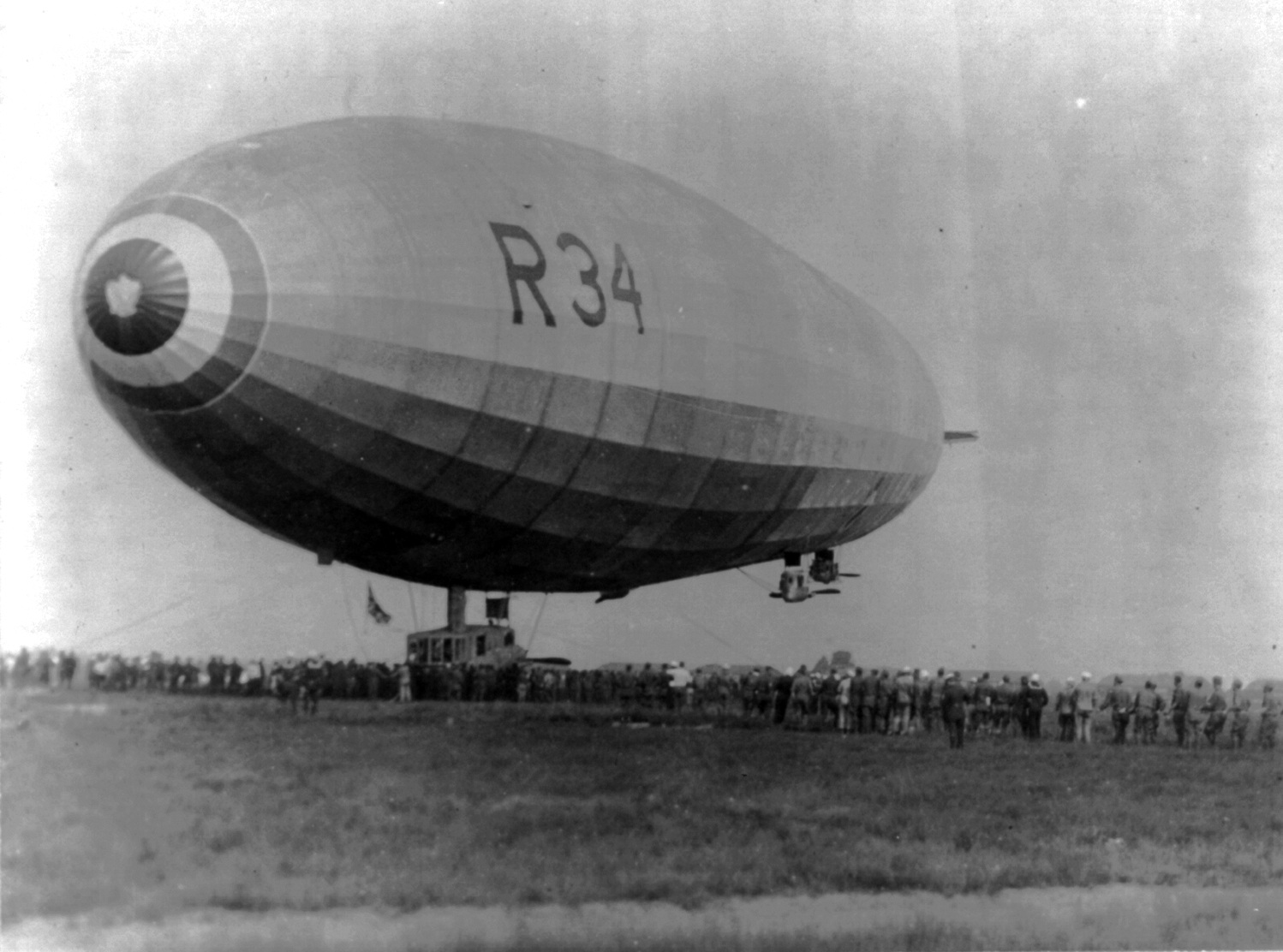
British R34 blimp lands at Mineola, New York, completing the first leg of a two-way transatlantic journey by air.

- British airship R34 arrived at Mineola, New York from Scotland, achieving the first transatlantic flight by dirigible as well as the first westbound flight. To commemorate the achievement, Major E. M. Pritchard parachuted from the airship, becoming the first person to arrive in the United States by air from Europe.
- German physician Magnus Hirschfeld opened the Institut für Sexualwissenschaft in Berlin to begin providing formal institutional research on human sexuality.
- The Pershing Stadium, built by the United States Army at Bois de Vincennes just outside Paris, was presented as a gift to France from the United States after the completion of the Inter-Allied Games. The stadium hosted the first Women's World Games in 1922 and football matches during the 1924 Summer Olympics. It closed in 1960.
- The Ak-Sar-Ben race track opened in Omaha, Nebraska.
- Born: Lucius D. Clay Jr., American air force officer, 7th Commander of NORAD, recipient of the Legion of Merit, Distinguished Flying Cross, and 11 Air Medals, son of Lucius D. Clay; in Alexandria, Virginia, United States (d. 1994)

== July 7, 1919 (Monday) ==
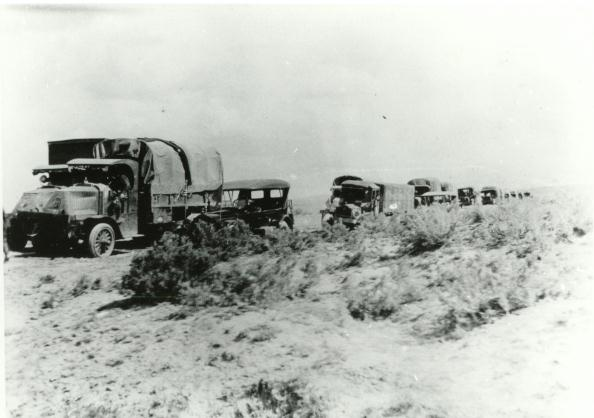
U.S. Army convoy crosses the United States.

- Forces with Czechoslovakia occupied Prešov, Slovakia and dissolved the Slovak Soviet Republic.
- The United States Army sent members of the Motor Transport Corps on a motor convoy across the continental United States, starting in Washington, D.C., to assess how troops could be moved across North America by road. Lieutenant-Colonel Charles W. McClure and Captain Bernard H. McMahon were the convoy's principal commanders, and future general Dwight D. Eisenhower, then a lieutenant-colonel, came along as one of the official observers. The trek eventually lead to the building of the U.S. Highway System.
- Around 2,100 cigar makers in Boston went on strike against manufacturers that failed to provide a pay raise.
- The 39th staging of the Wimbledon Championships in London with the following results:
  - Australian tennis player Gerald Patterson defeated fellow countryman Norman Brookes 6–3, 7–5, 6–2 in men's singles.
  - French tennis player Suzanne Lenglen defeated British contender Dorothea Douglass Lambert Chambers 10–8, 4–6, 9–7 in women's singles.
  - Australian pair Ronald Thomas and Pat O'Hara Wood defeated fellow countrymen Rodney Heath and Randolph Lycett 6–4, 6–2, 4–6, 6–2 in men's doubles.
  - Lenglen with American player Elizabeth Ryan defeated Chambers and British partner Ethel Thomson Larcombe, 4–6, 7–5, 6–3 in women's doubles.
  - Lycett and Ryan defeated Chambers and British partner Albert Prebble 6–0, 6–0 in mixed doubles.
- The first Citroën car was sold, a model called the Citroën Type A.
- The soft drink Calpis was introduced at the annual Star Festival in Japan, using the event's focus on the Milky Way to brand its bottles with trademark white dots on a blue background.
- The Knights of the Southern Cross were established in Campbell, Australian Capital Territory, Australia.
- Several rail stations were reopened in England after being closed down during World War I, including stations in Cheltenham.
- Born:
  - Jon Pertwee, British actor, best known as the Third Doctor in the science fiction television series Doctor Who and the title character in the children's television series Worzel Gummidge; in Chelsea, London, England (d. 1996)
  - William Kunstler, American lawyer and activist, defense lawyer for the Black Panther Party and the American Indian Movement, co-founder of the Center for Constitutional Rights; in New York City, United States (d. 1995)

== July 8, 1919 (Tuesday) ==
- Latvian forces formally took over Riga.
- Four-year-old James Baxter Hughes of Gueydan, Louisiana, fell into a hot spring at West Thumb in Yellowstone National Park. He died the next day from shock caused by burns.
- Born:
  - Walter Scheel, German state leader, 4th President of Germany; in Solingen, Weimar Republic (present-day Germany) (d. 2016)
  - Hans-Dieter Frank, German air force officer, commander of Nachtjagdgeschwader 1 for the Luftwaffe during World War II, recipient of the Knight's Cross of the Iron Cross; in Kiel, Weimar Republic (present-day Germany) (d. 1943, killed in action)

== July 9, 1919 (Wednesday) ==
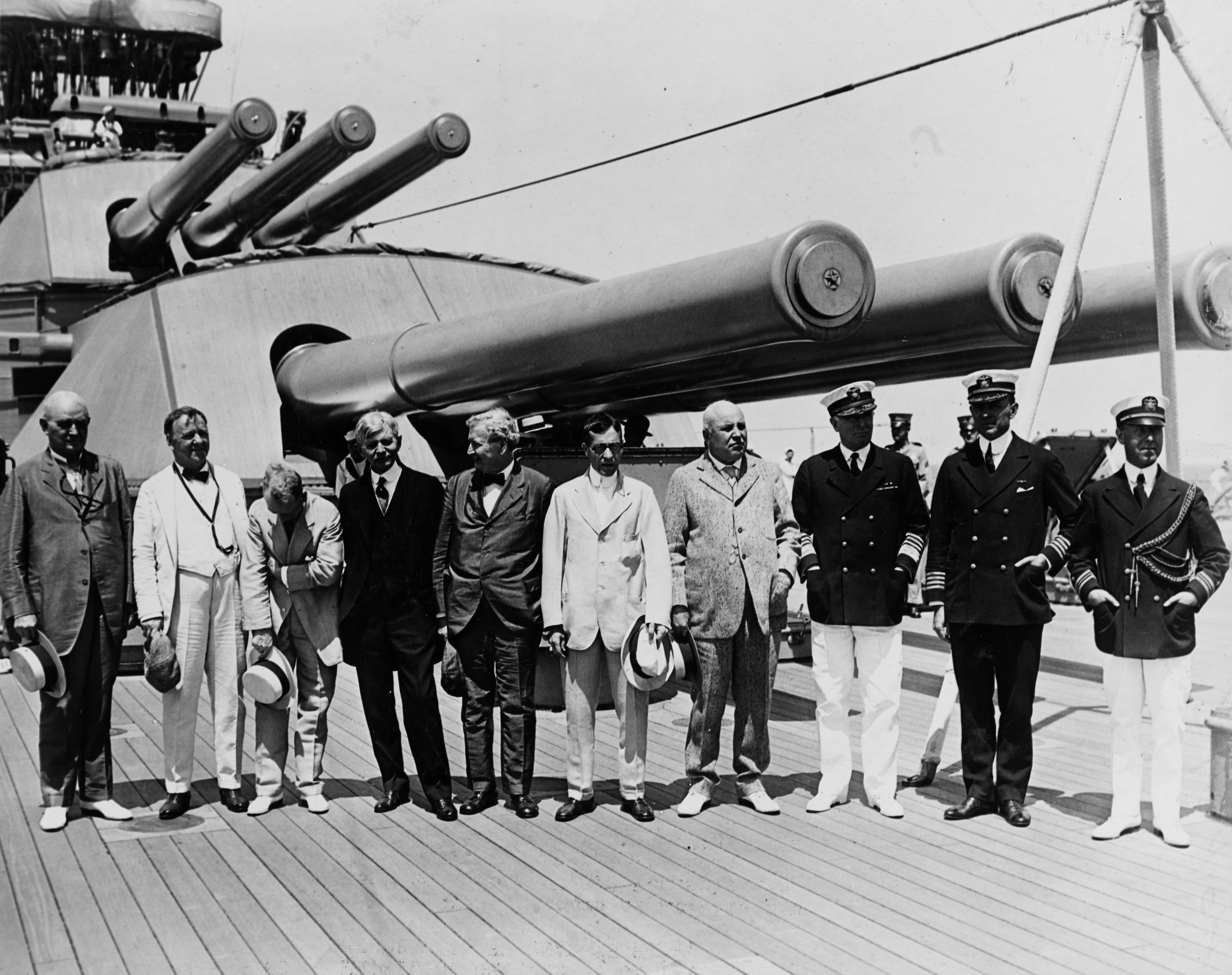
Members of President Wilson's cabinet who went out on the ship to welcome him home from the Versailles Peace Conference

- The Weimar National Assembly in Germany formally ratified the Treaty of Versailles by a vote of 209 to 116.
- A delegation consisting of: Vice President Thomas R. Marshall; Josephus Daniels, the Secretary of the Navy; Carter Glass, the Secretary of the Treasury; William B. Wilson, the Secretary of Labor; Newton D. Baker, the Secretary of War; Franklin K. Lane, the Secretary of the Interior; and Senator Champ Clark came aboard the USS Pennsylvania to welcome President Wilson home to New York from the Versailles Peace Conference.

== July 10, 1919 (Thursday) ==
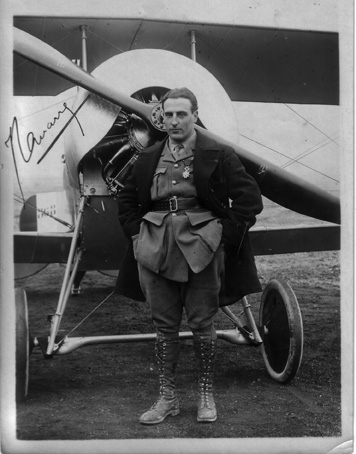
French flying ace Jean Navarre

- Red Summer – A race riot broke out in Longview, Texas, starting with the beating of a local black reporter accused of writing an article about the lynching of Lemuel Walters in June. A local doctor who defended the reporter had his house under siege later that night, resulting in a firefight where over 100 rounds of ammunition were expended.
- French aviator and celebrated war ace Jean Navarre died in an airplane crash while practicing an aerial stunt for Bastille Day. Navarre flew a Morane airplane repeatedly between two telephone poles and under a wire between them to simulate flying under the arches of the Arc de Triomphe at Champs-Élysées in Paris when he lost control and crashed into the ground. It was to have been an unauthorized first-ever flight under the Parisian landmark to protest pilots having to parade on foot at the upcoming July 14 World War I victory parade.
- British airship R34 departed from Mineola, New York for a 75-hour return flight from the United States to Pulham, Norfolk, England in what would be the first two-way crossing of the Atlantic Ocean by air.
- The 74th Infantry Division of the British Army was disbanded, along with the 229th, 230th, and 231st Brigades.
- The Gossner Evangelical Lutheran Church in Bihar, India declared its independence from the Anglican Church, which had managed the parish when its German missionaries left India at the start of World War I.
- New subway stations were added to the BMT Broadway Line in New York City, including 49th Street and 57th Street.
- Born:
  - Ian Wallace, British opera singer, best known for performances on television program Royal Variety Performance and radio program My Music; in London, England (d. 2009)
  - Pierre Gamarra, French writer, best known for his children's books La Maison de feu, Le Maître d'école, and La Mandarine et le Mandarin; in Toulouse, France (d. 2009)
  - Lawrence Edwards, American engineer, designer of the gravity-vacuum transit, in Delaware, Ohio (d. 2009)
- Died: Abraham Jacobi, 89, German-American physician, considered the father of modern pediatrics, opened the first children's hospital in the United States (b. 1830)

== July 11, 1919 (Friday) ==
- U.S. President Woodrow Wilson signed an appropriations bill for the United States Navy which included funding to convert collier ship USS Jupiter into the navy's first aircraft carrier.
- The International Federation of University Women was established in London to advocate for the right for women to access university and college education around the globe.
- The DAV College was established in Kanpur, India, the second oldest college in the city.
- Four students at the Tokyo Institute of Technology published the first edition of Seasonal Cinema News, the first and oldest Japanese film magazine.
- The Norwegian newspaper Gudbrandsdalens Arbeiderblad began publication in Lillehammer as the organ for the Labour Party.

== July 12, 1919 (Saturday) ==
- Women suffrage was extended to married women whose husbands were ratepayers and women over 30 who paid annual rent of £10 or more on the Isle of Jersey.
- Red Summer – A race riot in Longview, Texas resulted in its sole fatality, when 60-year old Marion Bush, a black public worker, was shot dead. Conflicting accounts suggested Bush was shot fleeing local police on a perceived arrest while others suggested he had been attacked by a white lynch mob.
- The Gheorghe Șincai National College, named after Romanian historian and educator Gheorghe Șincai, was established in Baia Mare, Romania, becoming one of three major Romanian secondary schools to prepare students for university education.
- Birkenhead Transport began providing bus services in Birkenhead, England.

== July 13, 1919 (Sunday) ==
- British airship R34 arrived at Pulham, Norfolk, England, completing the first ever two-way transatlantic crossing by air.
- Red Summer – The Texas National Guard arrived to restore order in Longview, Texas.
- The Tahmoor railway station opened on the Main Southern railway line in Tahmoor, New South Wales, Australia. It was added to the New South Wales State Heritage Register on 2 April 1999.
- Born:
  - Grisha Filipov, Bulgarian state leader, 38th Prime Minister of Bulgaria; in Kadiivka, Ukrainian People's Republic (present-day Ukraine) (d. 1994)
  - William F. Quinn, American politician, first Governor of Hawaii; in Rochester, New York, United States (d. 2006)
  - Joe Gill, American comic book writer, co-creator of Captain Atom; in Scranton, Pennsylvania, United States (d. 2006)
  - Jack Wheeler, English football player, goalkeeper for Birmingham and Huddersfield from 1938 to 1956; as William John Wheeler, in Evesham, England (d. 2009)

== July 14, 1919 (Monday) ==
- Red Summer – Hundreds of white male youths began attacking black patrons attending Garfield Park in Indianapolis, At one point, several black persons took refuge in a nearby house that was soon set upon by the mob. Defenders fired into a crowd, wounding an 18-year old youth and a seven-year-old girl bystander. Police arrived to end the riot.
- The first international commercial flight arrived at Hounslow Heath Aerodrome near London from Paris–Le Bourget Airport.
- Italian aviator Francesco Breck-Papa made the first nonstop flight from Rome to Paris while piloting a Fiat airplane. The 1,200-kilometer (745-mile) flight was also the first nonstop flight between two European capitals. Breck-Papa later flew from Paris to London and then on to Amsterdam.
- Born:
  - John Pott, British army officer, commander of the Parachute Regiment during World War II, recipient of the Order of the British Empire and Military Cross; as Robert Laslett John Pott, in Khartoum, Anglo-Egyptian Sudan (present-day Sudan) (d. 2005)
  - Lino Ventura, Italian actor, known for his roles in French cinema including Touchez pas au grisbi and Army of Shadows; in Parma, Kingdom of Italy (present-day Italy) (d. 1987)

== July 15, 1919 (Tuesday) ==
- Pope Benedict issued a declaration in support of women's political rights.
- Royal Air Force airship NS.11 exploded over the North Sea during a mine-hunting patrol and crashed in a ball of fire off Cley next the Sea, Norfolk, England, killing all nine members of her crew.
- Sloops HMS Gentian and HMS Myrtle were sunk by mines in the Gulf of Finland while assisting Estonia against Russia, with nine crew lost.
- The United Farmers of Alberta absorbed the Alberta Non-Partisan League to create its own political arm for federal politics.
- The Tadas Ivanauskas Zoological Museum was established in Kaunas, Lithuania.
- The Broken Hill railway line was extended in Broken Hill, New South Wales, Australia, with stations Broken Hill, Mount Gipps, The Gorge, and Menindee serving the line.
- The football club Auersmacher was established in Kleinblittersdorf, Germany.
- King Albert issued a royal decree that established the Victory Medal to be awarded to all members of the Belgian Armed Forces that served in World War I.
- Born: Iris Murdoch, Irish writer and philosopher, author of Under the Net, Sartre: Romantic Rationalist, and The Sovereignty of Good; as Jean Iris Murdoch, in Dublin, Ireland (d. 1999)
- Died: Emil Fischer, 66, German chemist, recipient of the Nobel Prize in Chemistry for research into esterification (b. 1852)

== July 16, 1919 (Wednesday) ==
- The Second Red Army was disbanded after which the leadership was transferred to the Southern Front army group.
- Born:
  - Choi Kyu-hah, Korean state leader, 10th Prime Minister of South Korea and 4th President of South Korea; in Genshū-gun, Korea, Empire of Japan (present-day Wonju, South Korea) (d. 2006)
  - Everett P. Pope, American marine officer, commander of the 1st Battalion, 1st Marines during World War II, recipient of the Medal of Honor for action at the Battle of Peleliu; in Milton, Massachusetts, United States (d. 2009)
  - Hermine Braunsteiner, Austrian army officer and war criminal, camp guard at the Ravensbrück and Majdanek concentration camps during World War II; in Vienna, Republic of German-Austria (present-day Austria) (d. 1999)
- Died: Itagaki Taisuke, 82, Japanese politician, leader of the Freedom and People's Rights Movement (b. 1837)

== July 17, 1919 (Thursday) ==
- Finland formally adopted a republican constitution that formally put an end to any plans of forming a monarchy.
- The Socialist Soviet Republic of Lithuania and Belorussia formally dissolved after most of its territory had been captured by Poland. The Soviet republic had barely lasted five months.
- The Alabama Senate rejected ratification of the Nineteenth Amendment of the U.S. Constitution with a vote of 19 against and 13 in favor.
- The first Betty and Taylors Tea Room opened in Harrogate, West Riding of Yorkshire, England by Swiss entrepreneur Fredrick Belmont.

== July 18, 1919 (Friday) ==
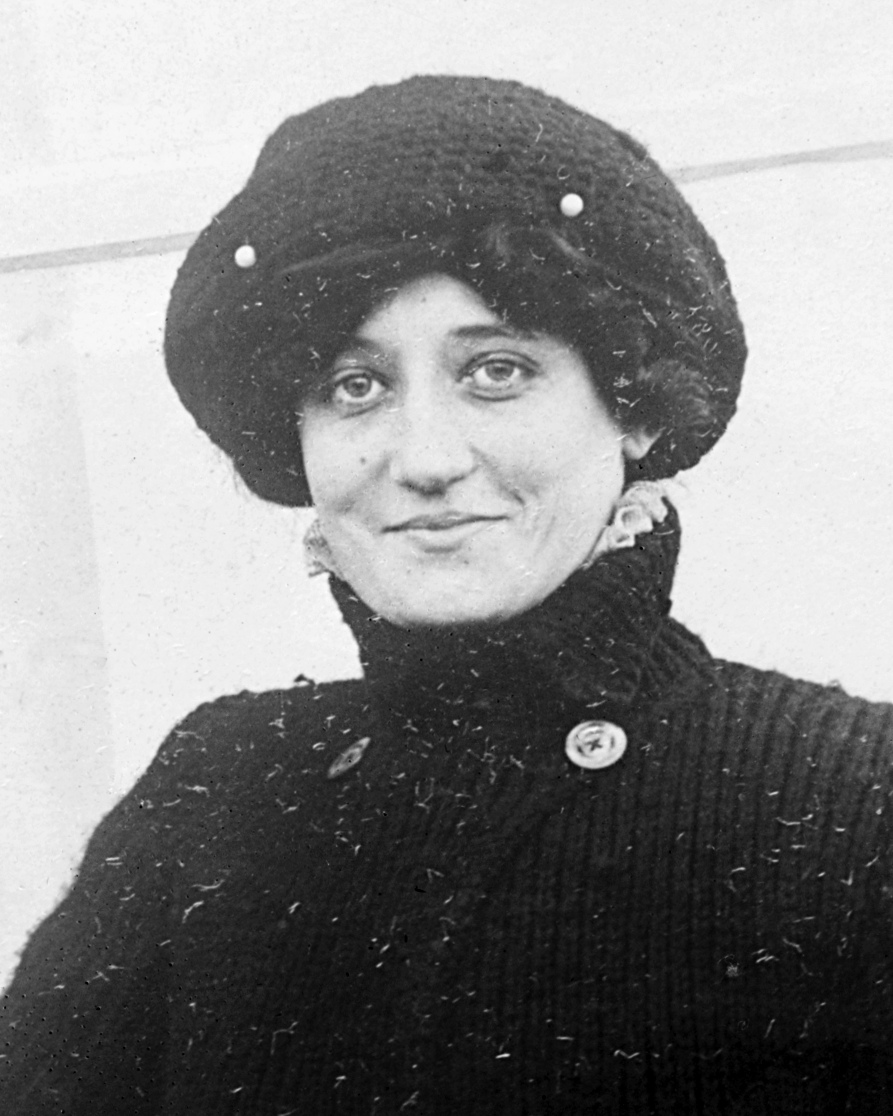
Raymonde de Laroche, one of the first women to pilot aircraft

- French aviator Raymonde de Laroche, the first woman to receive a pilot's license, died when the experimental Caudron airplane she was flying in as a passenger crashed at Le Crotoy airfield in France.
- A temporary cenotaph, as designed by Edwin Lutyens, was completed in London to commemorate the dead of World War I.
- Born:
  - Jayachamarajendra Wadiyar, Indian noble, fifth and last Maharaja of the Kingdom of Mysore; in Mysore, Kingdom of Mysore, British India (present-day Mysuru, Karnataka, India) (d. 1974)
  - Tamara Tchinarova, Ukrainian ballet dancer, known for her collaborations with Hélène Kirsova, Edouard Borovansky and The Australian Ballet; in Cetatea Albă, Kingdom of Romania (present-day Bilhorod-Dnistrovskyi, Ukraine) (d. 2017)

== July 19, 1919 (Saturday) ==
- The United Kingdom formally celebrated the end of World War I with victory parades in London and across country, referred to as "Peace Day" events.
- Red Summer – A race riot broke out in Washington, D.C. following an altercation between two black men and a white woman on New York Avenue. After police released both men with the charges dropped, enraged white mobs formed and began attacking black residents throughout the city.
- Veterans from World War I unhappy with unemployment and other issues began to riot during a Peace Day event in Luton, England, burning down Luton Town Hall before order could be restored.
- The Foreign Ministry of the Azerbaijan Democratic Republic was established, by decree of the chancellery for foreign affairs.
- The football club Brasil was established in Blumenau, Brazil. It underwent several names changes over the next few decades before becoming Blumenau in 1980.
- Born:
  - Richard H. Ellis, American air force officer, commander of Strategic Air Command from 1977 to 1981, three-time recipient of the Legion of Merit, Navy Distinguished Service Medal and Distinguished Flying Cross; in Laurel, Delaware, United States (d. 1989)
  - Robert Pinget, French writer, known for works including Pancarte pour une porte d'entrée; in Geneva, Switzerland (d. 1997)

== July 20, 1919 (Sunday) ==
- A general strike in solidarity with the Russian Revolution was proclaimed throughout Italy during the height of Biennio Rosso (Red Biennium). The general strike proved unsuccessful and lead to the rise of fascistic movements, particularly by those led by Benito Mussolini.
- Born:
  - Edmund Hillary, New Zealand mountain climber, first person along with Tenzing Norgay to reach the summit of Mount Everest, recipient of the Order of the Garter; in Auckland, New Zealand (d. 2008)
  - John F. Collins, American politician, 50th Mayor of Boston; in Boston, United States (d. 1995)
  - Ross T. Dwyer, American marine officer, commander of the 5th Marine Division and 1st Marine Division during the Vietnam War, three-time recipient of the Legion of Merit, Navy Distinguished Service Medal, and Bronze Star Medal; in Honolulu, United States (d. 2001)

== July 21, 1919 (Monday) ==
- Red Summer – The race riot in Washington, D.C. intensified with both sides arming themselves after police refused to intervene. Clashes were particularly violent around LeDroit Park. In some cases, sharpshooters took to rooftops to shoot at targets while others cruised around in automobiles and committed drive-by shootings.
- Red Summer – A race riot broke out in Norfolk, Virginia during a homecoming parade for African-American soldiers who served in World War I. City police and sailors from the nearby naval base were called in restore order.
- Women in Azerbaijan were granted the right to vote.
- The airship Wingfoot Air Express caught fire over downtown Chicago and crashed into the Illinois Trust and Savings Building, killing three of the five passengers and crew on board, and 10 people in the office building. Another 27 were injured in the disaster but two of the airship's crew were able to parachute to safety.
- The Crimean Soviet Army was disbanded after the Red Army was forced out of Crimea.
- German airplane designer Anthony Fokker founded the Dutch Aircraft Factory at Schiphol, Netherlands, using smuggled airplanes and parts out of Germany.
- King Albert issued a royal decree that established the Commemorative Medal to be awarded to all members of the Belgian Armed Forces that served in World War I. The King of Belgium himself was a recipient of the decoration.
- Died: James Bradley Orman, 69, American politician, 12th Governor of Colorado (b. 1849)

== July 22, 1919 (Tuesday) ==
- Norway Foreign Minister Nils Claus Ihlen declared attempts by Denmark to seek sovereignty over Greenland "would be met with no difficulties on the part of Norway."
- Pilots with the U.S. Airmail Service went on strike to protest the risks of flying in zero visibility to make scheduled air mail deliveries insisted by Second Assistant United States Postmaster General Otto Praeger - a policy that resulted in 15 crashes and two fatalities in the previous two weeks alone.
- The 168th Aero Squadron of the United States Army Air Service was disbanded at Camp Mills, Long Island, New York.
- The Ballets Russes gave the world premiere of Manuel de Falla's ballet The Three-Cornered Hat in London, which fused traditional Spanish dance with classical ballet.

== July 23, 1919 (Wednesday) ==
- Red Summer – U.S. President Woodrow Wilson ordered the National Guard to mobilize in Washington, D.C. as the race riot continued.
- The Turkish National Movement held congress in Erzurum, Turkey to discuss means to regain sovereignty from the Allies that occupied many parts of Turkey once part of the Ottoman Empire. Mustafa Kemal Atatürk was elected to lead the congress on the first day.
- The New India Assurance company was established in Bombay.
- Born:
  - Héctor Germán Oesterheld, Argentine journalist and comic book writer, creator of The Eternaut; in Buenos Aires, Argentina (d. 1977, disappeared)
  - Ray Rayner, American television personality, known for his children's television shows Ray Rayner and His Friends and The Bozo Show; in New York City, United States (d. 2004)

== July 24, 1919 (Thursday) ==
- Red Summer – Violence subsided in Washington, D.C. following clashes between white and black residents. The official death toll was 15, with 10 whites and five blacks although some historians report another 30 black deaths had not been officially counted. Another fifty people were seriously wounded and another 100 less severely wounded.
- Both state government houses in Georgia rejected the ratification of Nineteenth Amendment to the U.S. Constitution.
- Incumbent Aubin-Edmond Arsenault lost his seat as Premier of Prince Edward Island to John Howatt Bell during the Prince Edward Island provincial election.
- Poland established its own national police force.
- Mendel University was established in Brno (then part of Czechoslovakia).
- Born:
  - Ferdinand Kübler, Swiss cyclist, winner of the 1950 Tour de France and 1951 UCI Road World Championships; in Marthalen, Switzerland (d. 2016)
  - Asadollah Alam, Iranian state leader, 40th Prime Minister of Iran; in Birjand, Persia (d. 1978)
  - John Winkin, American baseball coach, managed Colby College and the Maine Black Bears from 1954 to 1986; in Englewood, New Jersey, United States (d. 2014)

== July 25, 1919 (Friday) ==
- Egyptian Revolution – The revolution formally ended in Egypt. A total 800 Egyptians were killed in fighting and another 1,600 wounded while British forces lost 29 men.
- Kaarlo Juho Ståhlberg was elected to become the first President of Finland, winning 71.5% of the vote over Carl Gustaf Emil Mannerheim in the first presidential election since Finland achieved independence from the Russian Empire. The upset was even more extraordinary since Mannerheim was instrumental in winning the Finnish Civil War in 1918 and cementing Finnish independence. Mannerheim eventually did win the presidency in 1944 when the Soviet threat was highest in World War II.
- Lev Karakhan, commissioner for foreign affairs for Soviet Russia, released a statement that the Soviets would relinquish many of the rights and reparations the Russian Empire has obtained through the Boxer Protocol following the end of the Boxer Rebellion, which helped lay down the groundwork for relations with the communist movement in China.
- The Fylde Rugby Club was established in Manchester, literally on a coin toss between forming the rugby club or a football club. It has since been a competitive club in the National Leagues.

== July 26, 1919 (Saturday) ==
- Born: James Lovelock, English environmentalist, proponent of the Gaia hypothesis; in Letchworth, England (d. 2022)
- Died:
  - Edward Poynter, 83, British painter, known for works including The Cave of the Storm Nymphs, president of the Royal Academy of Arts from 1896 to 1902 (b. 1836)
  - Tanner Smith, 31-32, American gangster, leader of the Marginals gang in New York City; murdered (b. 1887)

== July 27, 1919 (Sunday) ==
- Red Summer – A race riot erupted in Chicago, starting when a white man threw stones at a group of four black teens on a raft at a segregated beach, resulting in one of the rocks hitting teenager Eugene Williams and killing him. Despite witness testimony, a police officer on scene arrested a black man instead of the white perpetrator for Williams' death. Further protests escalated the violence.
- Belgian cyclist Firmin Lambot won the 13th Tour de France. Most of the roads were still damaged from fighting in World War I, making cycling more difficult and resulting in the lowest number of cyclists finishing the race in the Tour's history.
- The football club Olympia was established in Centrum, Paramaribo, Suriname.
- Died: Nykyfor Hryhoriv, 35, Ukrainian army officer, member of the National Army of Ukraine during the Ukrainian War of Independence, recipient of the Cross of St. George; executed (b. 1885)

== July 28, 1919 (Monday) ==
- Russian Civil War – The White Russian Caucasus Army captured Kamyshin, Russia while the Cossacks crossed the Volga River east of Moscow. However, the Don Army was forced backed and lost the towns of Liski and Balashov to the Red Army, and so prevented the eastern push on Moscow.
- The Arkansas Senate voted 29–2 in favor of women suffrage, and the Arkansas House of Representatives passed 75–17 in favor, making it the 12th state to ratify the Nineteenth Amendment to the U.S. Constitution.
- Epitácio Pessoa became President of Brazil, replacing Delfim Moreira who continued as Vice President.
- The International Astronomical Union was founded in Paris.

== July 29, 1919 (Tuesday) ==
- The Daegu Metropolitan Jungang Library was established in Daegu, Korea.
- The borough of Forest Hills, Pennsylvania was incorporated.
- Born: Luis Miquilena, Venezuelan politician, cabinet minister for the Hugo Chávez administration; in Coro, Venezuela (d. 2016)
- Died: Frederick Peters, 68, Canadian politician, 6th Premier of Prince Edward Island (b. 1851)

== July 30, 1919 (Wednesday) ==
- Baltic campaign – Royal Air Force squadron leader Grahame Donald led 11 aircraft for a dawn raid on the naval Russian base at Kronstadt, returning to report that at least one Russian destroyer had been sunk.
- Red Summer – Around 6,000 troops with the Illinois Army National Guard were called into Chicago to regain order as racial violence spread throughout the city. It was reported in many cases, criminal Irish gangs donned blackface and vandalized businesses and homes in neighbourhoods composed of eastern European immigrants to incite them to attack black neighbourhoods. Most violence was stopped but it would take until August 3 for full order to be restored.
- The Irish Republican Army unit, simply known as "The Squad", carried out the first assassination of a Royal Irish Constabulary officer when Detective Sergeant Pat "the Dog" Smyth of the Dublin police was shot dead near Drumcondra, Dublin.
- During a reconnaissance mission over southern Russia, a lead Airco aircraft piloted by Captain Walter Anderson with the Royal Air Force No. 47 Squadron was hit by ground fire. Some of the bullets struck the fuel tank of the planes, forcing co-pilot Lieutenant John Mitchell to climb onto the wing and plug the holes with his fingers. After a second plane with the reconnaissance team was forced down, Anderson and Mitchell landed to pick up its crew. Mitchell held off Russian cavalry with the Lewis gun in the rear cockpit before again climbing onto the wing to plug the fuel tank's hole with his fingers. The plane managed to return to base with all of the rescued crew. Anderson and Mitchell both received the Distinguished Service Order and later the Distinguished Flying Cross for their actions.
- The 638th Aero Squadron the United States Army Air Service was disbanded at Mitchell Field, New York.
- Due to public demand, the British war cabinet agreed to replace the temporary cenotaph by Edwin Lutyens with a permanent memorial and designate it as Britain's official national war memorial.
- The last train used the Altoona and Beech Creek Railroad. Effort failed to reopen the rail line and it was ripped up in 1921.
- The Order of the Cross of Vytis was established to honor those that led the heroic defense of Lithuania during the Lithuanian–Soviet War.
- Died: Simon Fraser, 86, Canadian-Australian politician, member of the Australian Senate for Victoria from 1901 to 1913 (b. 1832)

== July 31, 1919 (Thursday) ==
- Russian Civil War – White Russian forces advanced on Moscow from the west and southwestern directions, capturing Poltava in the west and defeating Red Army forces at Northern Tavria and west of Yekaterinoslav. Most White troops reached the line running from Verkhnodniprovsk to Nikopol along the Dnieper River. The Red Army did manage to halt the direct northward advance on Moscow.
- The Montana State Senate ratified the Nineteenth Amendment to the U.S. Constitution approving women's suffrage.
- Members of the National Union of Police and Prison Officers voted to strike in London and Liverpool, but the actual number of officers that actually participated was significantly lower than in 1918. Over 2,000 strikers were eventually dismissed.
- The British Housing Act was enacted to provide government subsidy for the provision of council houses, with the target of completing 500,000 houses by 1922.
- The 1st Hull Heavy Battery of the Royal Garrison Artillery was disbanded in Clipstone, Nottinghamshire, England.
- The 85th Aero Squadron of the United States Army Air Service was disbanded at Camp Mills, Long Island, New York.
- The Seabird became the first aircraft to fly non-stop from London to Madrid, a total 900 miles in under eight hours.
- Born:
  - Primo Levi, Italian chemist and writer, author of The Holocaust memoir If This Is a Man and The Periodic Table; in Turin, Kingdom of Italy (present-day Italy) (d. 1987)
  - Robert Morgenthau, American lawyer, United States Attorney for the Southern District of New York from 1962 to 1970, New York County District Attorney from 1975 to 2009; in New York City, United States (d. 2019)
  - Curt Gowdy, American sportscaster, known for his work with NBC Sports and ABC Sports and as the voice of the Boston Red Sox; in Green River, Wyoming, United States (d. 2006)
- Died: Dick Barlow, 68, English cricketer, batsman for the England cricket team from 1881 to 1887, and the Lancashire County Cricket Club from 1871 to 1891 (b. 1851)
