= June 1919 =

Month in 1919

<<	June 1919					>>
Su	Mo	Tu	We	Th	Fr	Sa
1	2	3	4	5	6	7
8	9	10	11	12	13	14
15	16	17	18	19	20	21
22	23	24	25	26	27	28
29	30

The following events occurred in June 1919:

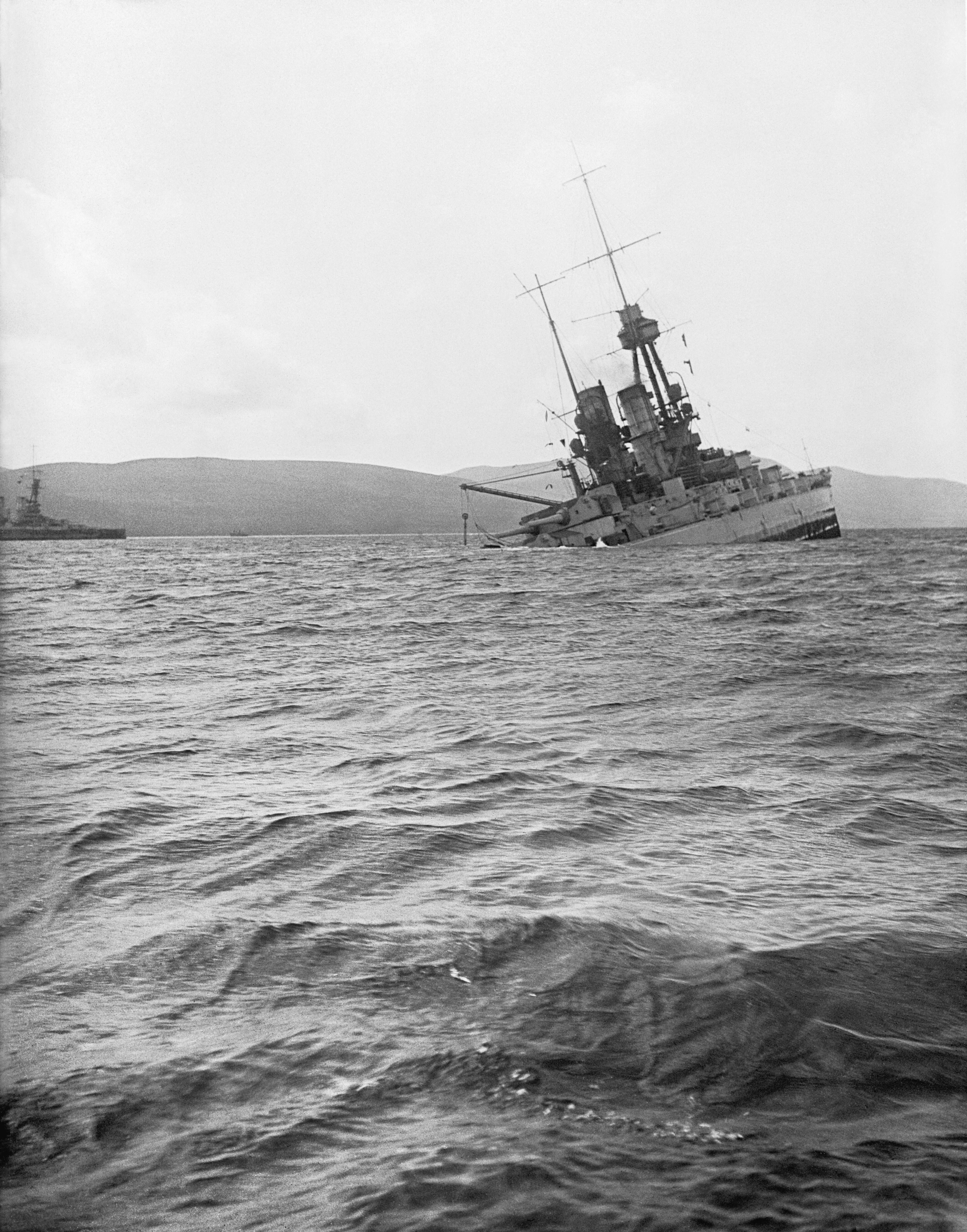
German battleship SMS Bayern sinks in Scapa Flow after it was scuttled along with other ships of the interned Imperial German Navy on June 21, 1919.

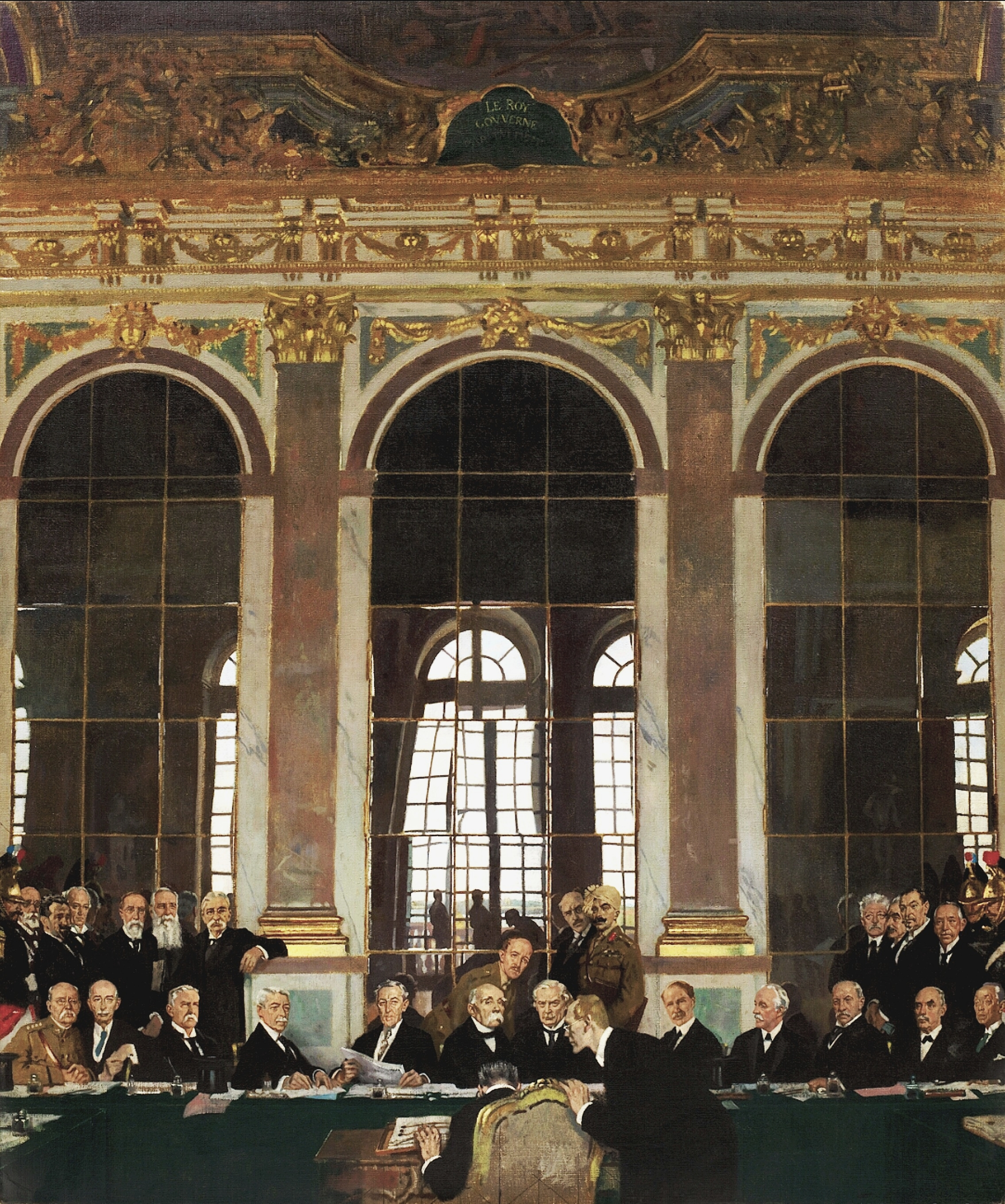
Painting by William Orpen, The Signing of Peace in the Hall of Mirrors, depicting the signing of the Treaty of Versailles to formally end World War I on June 28, 1919.

== Sunday, June 1, 1919 ==
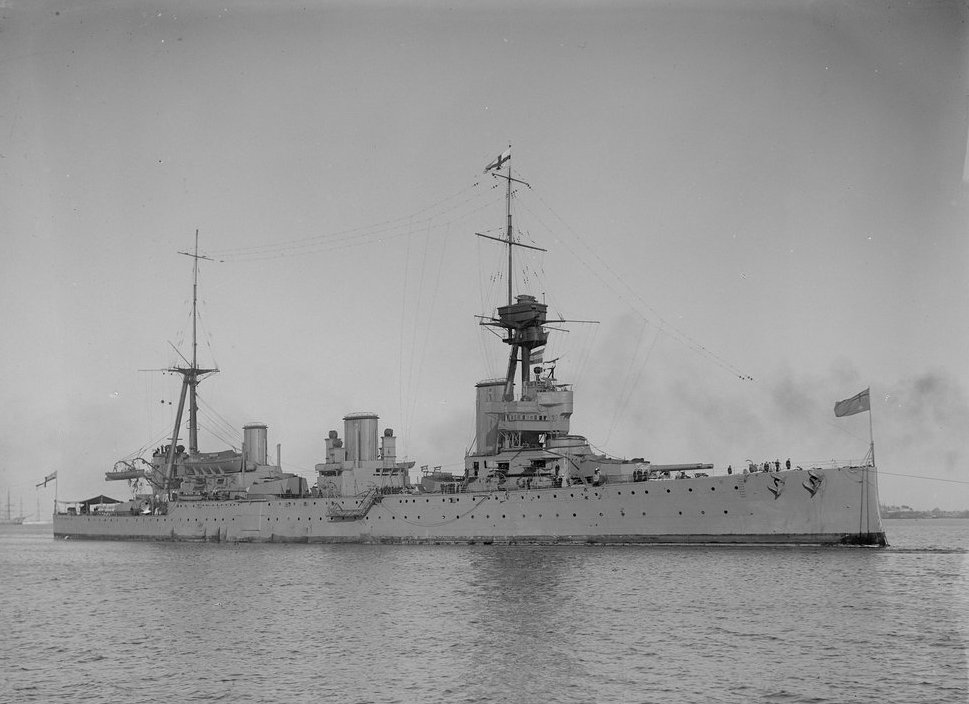
Sailors muntiny on HMS Australia in the port of Fremantle, Australia.

- The soviet republics in Russia, Ukraine, Lithuania-Belorussia, Latvia, and the Crimea formed a military union.
- Third Anglo-Afghan War – The London Regiment, along with British Indian and Sikh units under the command of Colonel Reginald Dyer punched through a line of tribal resistance fighters with artillery on their way to relieve besieged forces at Thall, British India (now Pakistan), but suffered 94 casualties.
- A mutiny broke out on the Royal Australian Navy battlecruiser HMAS Australia shortly after it arrived in Fremantle, Australia, effectively delaying its scheduled departure to Melbourne by one hour.
- The Hakone Tozan Railway opened the Hakone Tozan Line in Kanagawa Prefecture, Japan, with stations Hakone-Yumoto, Ōhiradai, Miyanoshita, Kowakidani, Ni-no-Taira, and Gōra serving the line. As well, the Seibu Tamagawa Line was extended with stations Jōkyū serving the line.
- Several rail stations were reopened in Scotland after being closed down during World War I, including stations in Crosshill, Crookston, and Glasgow.
- American chemist Irving Langmuir introduced the term covalence in relation to chemical bonding models in the Journal of the American Chemical Society.
- The Algonquin Round Table, a group of writers, critics and actors that included Alexander Woollcott and Dorothy Parker, began meeting for daily lunches at the Algonquin Hotel in New York City. The group gather would meet regularly for another 10 years before it dissolved.
- Born: Gisbert Hasenjaeger, German mathematician, known for his research into first-order logic, member of the Cipher Department of the High Command of the Wehrmacht during World War II and the Enigma program; in Hildesheim, Weimar Republic (present-day Germany) (d. 2006)
- Died: Caroline Still Anderson, 70, American physician, one of the first African American women to practice medicine in the United States (b. 1848)

== Monday, June 2, 1919 ==
- Third Anglo-Afghan War – British forces attacked Afghan regulars west of Thall, British India, despite a notice from Afghanistan for a ceasefire. A message delay from headquarters forced commander Colonel Reginald Dyer to reply: "My guns will give an immediate reply, but your letter will be forwarded to the Divisional Commander." The attack forced the Afghan to retreat with the British in pursuit, despite resistance from 400 Afghan tribesmen.
- Italian anarchists led by Luigi Galleani sent eight mail bombs to prominent American public figures including United States Attorney General A. Mitchell Palmer and Cleveland Mayor Harry L. Davis. None of the bombs killed their intended targets, but a night watchman for New York City was killed handling one of the packages. This motivated Palmer to request extra funding from the United States House Committee on Appropriations to investigate and arrest the groups behind the bomb attacks.
- British Prime Minister David Lloyd George and the Colonial Office approved a Royal Air Force proposal to send a self-contained air unit to British Somaliland to regain control over the colony from the Dervish State of Diiriye Guure. It would be the first time the concept of "aerial policing" was used to suppress colonial rebellions.
- The 99th Aero Squadron of the United States Army Air Service was disbanded at Mitchell Field, New York.
- Several rail stations were reopened in Scotland after being closed down during World War I, including stations in Burnbank, Esk Bridge, Kelvinside, Mount Vernon, and Roslin.
- Sports club Germania Hamburg merged with another rival sports club in Hamburg to become Hamburger SV. The club is most famous for its competitive football program, which included national titles in the German football league system.
- Sports club Växjö was established in Växjö, Sweden, becoming well known for its women's and disabled sports programs.
- The borough of Southmont, Pennsylvania, was incorporated.
- Born:
  - Agustín Ramos Calero, Puerto Rican soldier, most decorated Hispanic soldier for the United States Army during World War II, recipient of the Silver Star and Croix de Guerre; in Isabela, Puerto Rico (d. 1989)
  - Garlin Murl Conner, American army officer, member of the 7th Infantry Regiment during World War II, recipient of the Medal of Honor, Distinguished Service Cross, four Silver Stars, and the Croix de guerre; in Aaron, Kentucky, United States (d. 1998)

== Tuesday, June 3, 1919 ==
- Third Anglo-Afghan War – Facing a general retreat and losing units to capture, Afghanistan pursued an armistice with the United Kingdom. Some fighting with local militia continued for another two months before a peace treaty was signed on August 8. The Afghans lost 1,000 men while the British recorded 236 killed in action, 615 wounded, 566 deaths from cholera, and 334 deaths from other diseases or accidents.
- The Philippines held elections for the Senate and the House of Representatives, with the ruling Nacionalista Party increasing their number of House seats.
- The sports club Central Córdoba was established in Santiago del Estero, Argentina. It is most known for its football team in the Primera Nacional.
- Born: Elizabeth Duncan Koontz, American educator and activist, first African American woman to be president of the National Education Association and 6th director of the United States Women's Bureau; in Salisbury, North Carolina, United States (d. 1989)

== Wednesday, June 4, 1919 ==
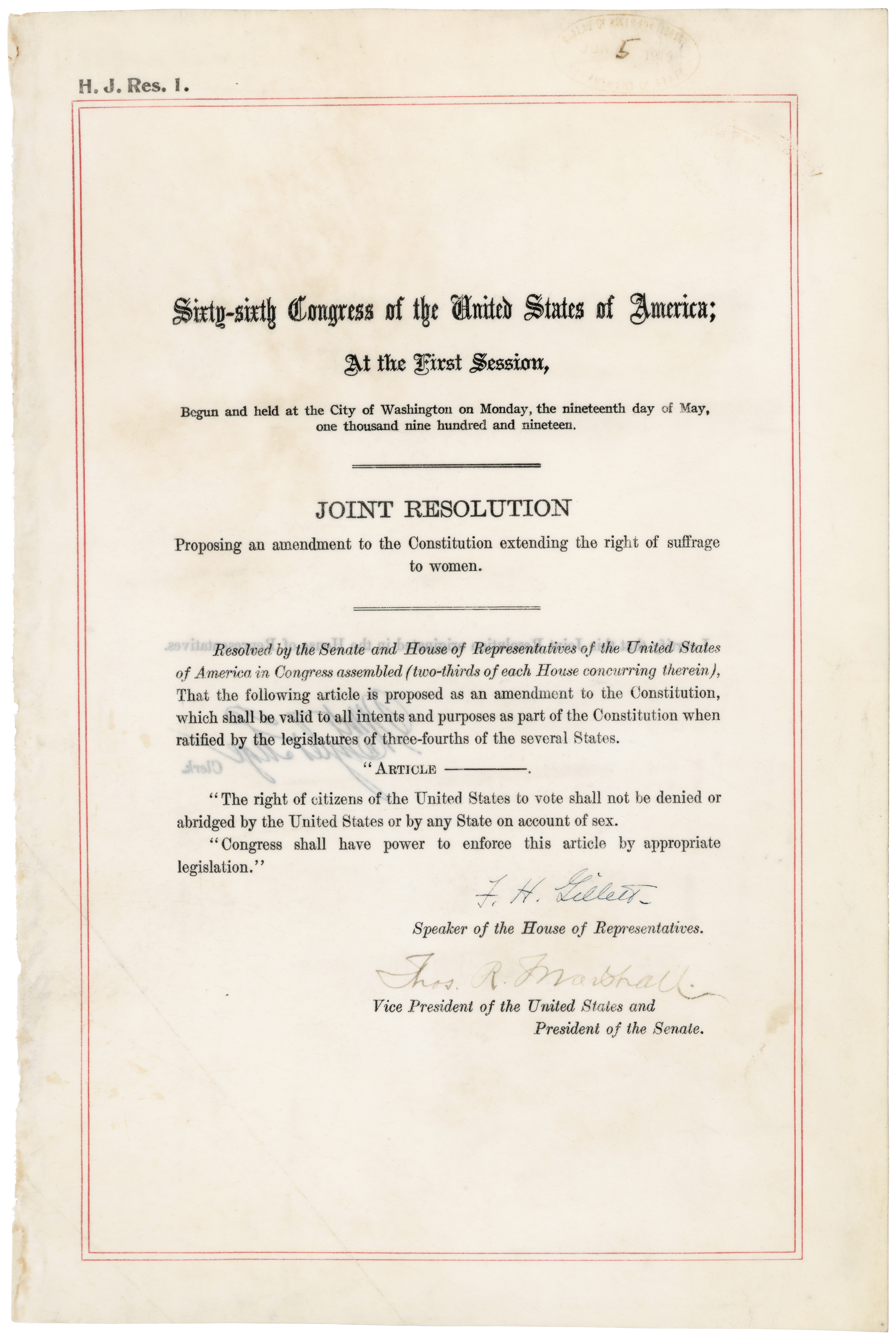
The Nineteenth Amendment in the National Archives

- The United States Congress approved the Nineteenth Amendment to the United States Constitution, which would guarantee suffrage to women, and sent it to the U.S. states for ratification.
- The 27th Australian Battalion was disbanded.
- The 2nd Ukrainian Soviet Army was disbanded and absorbed into the 14th Red Army.
- The One Big Union was established in Calgary in an attempt to organize syndicalist trade unions in Western Canada. It merged with the Canadian Labour Congress in 1956.
- A group of five British engineering firms formed the corporate conglomerate Agricultural & General Engineers in London, however, allegations of fraud forced the company to be liquidated in 1932.
- Citroën, a member of PSA Group was founded in France.
- Born: Dorothy Howell Rodham, American matriarch, mother of Hillary Clinton; in Chicago, United States (d. 2011)
- Died:
  - Tokudaiji Sanetsune, 79, Japanese politician, second Lord Keeper of the Privy Seal of Japan (b. 1840)
  - William T. Haines, 64, American politician, 49th Governor of Maine; died of pneumonia (b. 1854)

== Thursday, June 5, 1919 ==
- Estonian War of Independence and Latvian War of Independence – A southern front in the war opened up when the pro-German Baltische Landeswehr force, supported by German reserve units, advanced against Estonian and Latvian forces in northern Latvia.
- Khosrov bey Sultanov, governor of the districts of Karabakh and Zangezur in the disputed territory of Nagorno-Karabakh, Azerbaijan, ordered troops to subdue rebelling ethnic Armenians in the villages of Khaibalikend, Jamillu, Karkujahan and Pahliul. Over the next two days, soldiers massacred 600 to 700 Armenians, including women and children.
- An explosion at the Delaware and Hudson Coal Company mine in Wilkes-Barre, Pennsylvania, killed 92 miners and injured another 44 men, making it one of the deadliest industrial accidents in Pennsylvania's history.
- Russian choreographer Léonide Massine premiered his ballet The Fantastic Toyshop at the Alhambra Theatre in London with Ballets Russes performing.
- Football club Atlético Grau was established in Piura, Peru, as one of the provincial league teams in the region.
- Born:
  - James C. Fletcher, American space engineer, 4th and 7th Administrator of NASA; in Millburn, New Jersey, United States (d. 1991)
  - Richard Scarry, American writer and illustrator, best known for his Busytown and Tinker and Tanker book series for children including Best Word Book Ever; in Boston, United States (d. 1994)
- Died: Manuel Franco, 47, Paraguayan state leader, 26th President of Paraguay; died of a heart attack (b. 1871)

== Friday, June 6, 1919 ==
- Estonian War of Independence and Latvian War of Independence – Estonian forces crossed the Daugava River and occupied the Latvian town of Jēkabpils while the Baltische Landeswehr took control of Cēsis, setting both forces up for a major confrontation in northern Latvia.
- The Hungarian National Army was established as the land force for Hungarian Soviet Republic but was renamed the Royal Hungarian Army in 1920 after the soviet government was overthrown and the resulting democratic republic established the Kingdom of Hungary.
- The Fascist Manifesto by Benito Mussolini was published in the newspaper The People of Italy.
- The Government of Canada established the Air Board as its civil aviation authority, the first country to legislate and implement rules governing the entire domain of aviation within its borders.
- The football club Blumenthaler SV was established in Bremen, Germany.
- Born: Peter Carington, British politician, cabinet minister for the Edward Heath administration, Secretary General of NATO from 1984 to 1988; in Chelsea, London, England (d. 2018)
- Died:
  - Inoue Enryō, 61, Japanese academic, founder of Toyo University, creator of Tetsugaku-dō Park (b. 1858)
  - Nicole Girard-Mangin, 40, French physician, first female medical officer to serve in the French Army (b. 1878)

== Saturday, June 7, 1919 ==
- Russian Civil War – The Fifth Red Army captured Birsk, Russia from the White Russians.
- British troops fired on a mob protesting against the colonial government in Malta, killing four people. This resulted in support for political parties closely associated with Italy and increased independence from the United Kingdom. The date since then has been commemorated as the national holiday of Sette Giugno in Malta.
- The Desert Mounted Corps of the British Army was officially disbanded in Cairo.
- The Latvian Air Force was founded to combat German and White Russian forces threatening the country.
- French aviator Raymonde de Laroche set a women's altitude record of nearly 13,000 feet (4,000 m) while flying a Caudron airplane.
- Commercial luxury transporter Daimler created a commercial airline arm that became Daimler Airway, a short-lived luxury commercial airline in England.
- The thirteenth book in the Oz series, The Magic of Oz, was published a month after the death of author L. Frank Baum. Sales for it and the previous book The Tin Woodman of Oz were strong, likely due to his recent death.
- The rugby team Two Blues was established in Cabramatta, New South Wales, Australia.
- Died: Henning von Holtzendorff, 66, German naval officer, architect of unrestricted submarine warfare during World War I, recipient of the Order of the Black Eagle and Pour le Mérite (b. 1853)

== Sunday, June 8, 1919 ==
- Royal Air Force Fairey seaplanes attacked four armed Soviet Steamboats on Lake Onega, Russia, during the Russian Civil War. Although the attack did little damage, the Soviet boats were surprised and forced to flee, pursued by four smaller and less-well-armed Royal Navy torpedo boats.
- Belgian cyclist Hector Tiberghien won the 14th edition of the Paris–Tours cycling race, completing the 342 km route in 12 hours, 35 minutes.
- Italian cyclist Costante Girardengo won the 7th edition of the Giro d'Italia cycling race, completing the 2,984 km (1,854 mi) route with a winning time of 112 hours, 51 minutes, 29 seconds.
- The Pi Epsilon Delta honor society for drama students was established at the University of Wisconsin. It became known as the National Collegiate Players when it merged with other drama honor societies in 1922.
- Football and sports clubs were established in the following cities: Rio Branco in Rio Branco, Acre, Brazil, and Essinge in Stockholm with programs in football, bandy, handball and ice hockey.
- Born:
  - Abdirashid Shermarke, Somalian state leader, second President and third Prime Minister of Somalia; in Harardhere, Italian Somaliland (present-day Somalia) (d. 1969, assassinated)
  - John R. Deane Jr., American army officer, commander of the 173rd Airborne Brigade during the Vietnam War, two-time recipient of the Distinguished Service Cross and three-time recipient of the Distinguished Service Medal; in San Francisco, United States (d. 2013)
  - Guy Overton, New Zealand cricketer, batsman for the New Zealand national cricket team from 1953 to 1954; in Dunedin, New Zealand (d. 1993)
  - Bill Newton, Australian air force officer, commander of the No. 22 Squadron during World War II, recipient of the Victoria Cross; in St Kilda, Victoria, Australia (d. 1943, executed)

== Monday, June 9, 1919 ==
- Russian Civil War – The Red Army captured Ufa, Russia, from the White Russians.
- The Ukrainian National Council was dissolved after most of the sovereign territory of West Ukrainian People's Republic was overrun by forces from First Czechoslovak Republic.
- The Philippine Women's University was established in Manila to provide women access to college and university level education.
- The town of Altheimer, Arkansas, was incorporated, named after two prominent merchant brothers Joseph and Louis Altheimer of Darmstadt-Eberstadt, Germany.
- Born: Isaac Boleslavsky, Ukrainian chess player, runner-up in the 1951 World Chess Championship; in Zolotonosha, Ukrainian People's Republic (present-day Ukraine) (d. 1977)

== Tuesday, June 10, 1919 ==
- The states of Illinois, Wisconsin, and Michigan became the first three states to ratify the 19th Amendment which gave women the right to vote.
- Winnipeg general strike – The Canadian federal government ordered the arrest of eight Winnipeg strike leaders including J. S. Woodsworth and A. A. Heaps.
- American aviator Ruth Law broke the women's altitude record set days earlier by Raymonde de Laroche, flying to 14,700 feet (4,500 m).
- Born:
  - Kevin O'Flanagan, Irish football and rugby player, forward for Bohemian from 1936 to 1945, the Republic of Ireland national football team from 1937 to 1947, and the Ireland national rugby union team from 1942 to 1947; in Dublin, Ireland (d. 2006)
  - César Luis González, Puerto Rican-American air force officer, first Puerto Rican pilot for the United States Army Air Forces, recipient of the Air Medal; in Adjuntas, Puerto Rico (d. 1943, killed in action)
- Died: Mieczysław Garsztka, 22, Polish air force officer, commander of the Polish 7th Air Escadrille; killed in a plane crash near Lwów, Poland (b. 1896)

== Wednesday, June 11, 1919 ==
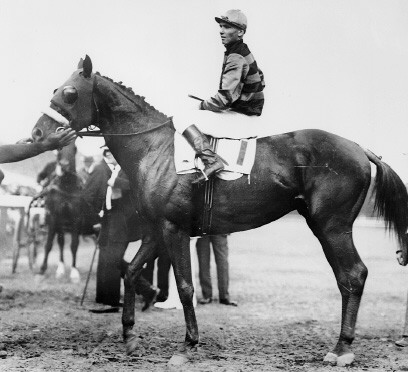
Racehorse Sir Barton, with jockey Johnny Loftus, first American racehorse to the Triple Crown.

- Hungarian forces invaded the small independent Hutsul Republic in Rakhiv (now part of western Ukraine) and dissolved the country.
- Thoroughbred racehorse Sir Barton, ridden by Johnny Loftus, won the 51st running of the Belmont Stakes with a winning time of 2:17.4, becoming the first American racehorse to win the Triple Crown.
- Born:
  - Richard Todd, Irish actor, best known for his film roles in The Hasty Heart and The Dam Busters; in Dublin, Ireland (d. 2009)
  - Suleiman Mousa, Jordanian historian, best known his biographies on Hussein bin Ali and T. E. Lawrence; in Al Rafeed, Occupied Enemy Territory Administration (present-day Jordan) (d. 2008)
- Died: John Coit Spooner, 76, American politician, U.S. Senator from Wisconsin from 1885 to 1891, and 1897 to 1907 (b. 1843)

== Thursday, June 12, 1919 ==
- New York City police raided the offices of the Russian Soviet Government Bureau on West 40th Street, which had been set up as a trade and information agency between Soviet Russia and the United States. The raid was backed by the Lusk Committee of the New York State Legislature to investigate what it deemed alleged communist activities within the United States.
- Not to be outdone by American rival Ruth Law, French aviator Raymonde de Laroche regained her top standing by breaking the women's altitude record again, flying to a height of 5,150 m (16,900 ft).
- Pro golfer Walter Hagen defeated challenger Mike Brady by a single stroke to win his second and final U.S. Open at the Brae Burn Country Club in West Newton, Massachusetts.
- Brazilian composer Heitor Villa-Lobos completed Symphony No. 3, the first in the trilogy of symphonies covering the themes of war, victory, and peace. The second composition, Symphony No. 4, was completed in September.
- Born:
  - Ahmed Abdallah, Comoran state leader, first President of the Comoros; in Domoni, Anjouan, Comoros (d. 1989)
  - Uta Hagen, German-American actress and instructor, recipient of the Tony Award for Best Actress in a Play for The Country Girl and Who's Afraid of Virginia Woolf?, author of Respect for Acting and A Challenge for the Actor; in Göttingen, Weimar Republic (present-day Germany) (d. 2004)

== Friday, June 13, 1919 ==
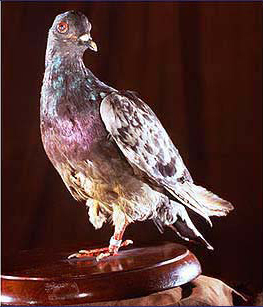
United States Army homing pigeon Cher Ami

- Cher Ami, the United States Army homing pigeon that provided critical information that ultimately saved the embattled 77th Infantry Division from being overwhelmed during the Meuse–Argonne offensive at the close of World War I, succumbed to injuries and died while at Fort Monmouth, New Jersey. Prior to her death, she was awarded the Croix de Guerre, with her caregiver Enoch Clifford Swain of the U.S. Signal Corps receiving the decoration on her behalf.
- The 163rd and 278th Aero Squadrons of the United States Army Air Service were disbanded at Mitchell Field, New York.
- The 3rd Ukrainian Soviet Army was disbanded and became part of the 12th Red Army.
- The town of Vero, Florida, was established; it officially changed its name to Vero Beach in 1925.
- The village of Rimbey, Alberta was incorporated.
- Born:
  - Leo Brewer, American chemist, member of the Manhattan Project; in St. Louis, United States (d. 2005)
  - Lê Quang Tung, Vietnamese army officer, commander of the Army of the Republic of Vietnam Special Forces, architect of the Xá Lợi Temple raids in 1963; in Hương Trà, French Indochina (present-day Vietnam) (d. 1963, assassinated)

== Saturday, June 14, 1919 ==
- The National Assembly of Soviets was established as the legislative branch of the Hungarian Soviet Republic but would only remain active for about two months, until the soviet government was overthrown in August.
- British pilot John Alcock and navigator Arthur Whitten Brown left St. John's, Newfoundland, flying a Vickers Vimy in the first nonstop flight across the Atlantic Ocean.
- U.S. Navy pilot Charles Hammann died in an aircraft crash at Langley Field, Virginia. He would receive the Medal of Honor posthumously the following year for a heroic action during World War I, retroactively becoming the first U.S. aviator ever to receive the award.
- Robert Munro, Secretary of State for Scotland, opened new hospital buildings to treat patients with tuberculosis in East Kilbride, Scotland, eventually becoming University Hospital Hairmyres.
- Weekly newspaper The Leven Lever was first published in Ulverstone, Tasmania, Australia and ran for about a year before folding in 1920.
- Football club Orijent was established in the disputed port city of Fiume, before it became part of Rijeka, Croatia.
- Born:
  - Sam Wanamaker, American theatrical director, credited for restoring Shakespeare's Globe in London, founder of Sam Wanamaker Playhouse; as Samuel Wattenmacker, in Chicago, United States (d. 1993)
  - Gene Barry, American actor, best known for his lead roles in 1960s television series Bat Masterson and Burke's Law; as Eugene Klass, in New York City, United States (d. 2009)
  - Jack Riley, Canadian hockey player and sports executive, first general manager of the Pittsburgh Penguins; in Toronto, Canada (d. 2016)
  - James Allen Ward, New Zealand air force officer, member of the No. 75 Squadron during World War II, recipient of the Victoria Cross; in Whanganui, New Zealand (d. 1941, killed in action)
- Died:
  - Weedon Grossmith, 65, English writer, co-author with brother George Grossmith of The Diary of a Nobody (b. 1854)
  - Ernest Lister, 48, American politician, 8th Governor of Washington; died of heart and kidney disease (b. 1870)

== Sunday, June 15, 1919 ==
- Russian Civil War – The Ukrainian Front was abolished.
- The Maurist Party gained majority of the seats for the Congress of Deputies and Senate during elections for the 18th Cortes Generales (legislative houses) of Spain.
- Equal suffrage was applied to men and women in Czechoslovakia for municipal elections.
- British pilot John Alcock and navigator Arthur Whitten Brown completed the first nonstop 16-hour flight across the Atlantic Ocean, landing at Clifden, County Galway, Ireland. They won £10,000 from the Daily Mail and received knighthoods later that year.
- Pancho Villa lead a force of 9,500 men to attack Ciudad Juárez, Mexico, where a force of 7,300 Carrancistas were garrisoned. When the bullets began to fly to the American side of the border, two units of the U.S. 7th Cavalry Regiment totaling 8,600 men crossed the border to repulse Villa's forces away from American territory. Villa lost 150 men while the opposing Mexican-American side lost 69 men, plus another 27 civilians killed. Villa's defeat ended any other attempts to stage offensives near the Mexican-American border, making it the last major battle of the Border War between Mexican revolutionary and American forces.
- Frederick Handley Page established Handley Page Transport as one of the first British commercial airlines.
- Charlie Chaplin released his third film through First National Pictures, a comedy short titled Sunnyside with regular co-star Edna Purviance.
- The comic strip Old Doc Yak, created by Sidney Smith, was published for a final time, with the title character purposely selling off his trademark car to his neighbours The Gumps so he could move away "to start life all over again".
- The Central Sport Club was established in Caruaru, Brazil.
- Born:
  - Charles Kaman, American aeronautical engineer, known for his research into developing the helicopter; in Washington, D.C., United States (d. 2011)
  - Van T. Barfoot, American army officer, commander of the 157th Infantry Regiment during World War II, recipient of the Medal of Honor for action in France, the Silver Star and Bronze Star Medal; in Edinburg, Mississippi, United States (d. 2012)
- Died: Prince Francis Joseph of Braganza, 39, Austrian noble, collaborated with Henrique Mitchell de Paiva Cabral Couceiro to overthrow the First Portuguese Republic (b. 1879)

== Monday, June 16, 1919 ==
- Paris Peace Conference – The Allies submitted to Germany an ultimatum to accept a draft of the peace treaty within five days or risk renewed warfare.
- Russian Civil War – White Russian forces began a general retreat from the Eastern Front.
- Invading Hungarian forces established the Slovak Soviet Republic in the Prešov, Czechoslovakia, as the region was predominantly ethic Hungarian.
- The states of Kansas, Ohio, and New York ratified the 19th Amendment.
- The 39th stage of the U.S. National Championships for women was held at the West Side Tennis Club in New York City.
- The 28th Aero Squadron of the United States Army Air Service was disbanded in Garden City, New York.
- The St. Louis Municipal Opera Theatre, an outdoor amphitheater better known at The Muny, opened to the public with a performance of the comic opera Robin Hood by Reginald De Koven.
- Born:
  - Lynn de Silva, Sri Lankan theologian, leading proponent of dialogue between Buddhism and Christianity; in Kurana, British Ceylon (present-day Sri Lanka) (d. 1982)
  - V. T. Sambanthan, Malaysian politician, 5th President of the Malaysian Indian Congress; as Thirunyanasambanthan s/o Veerasamy, in Sungai Siput, British Malaya (present-day Malaysia) (d. 1979)
- Died: Fernando Figueroa, 70, Salvadoran state leader, 22nd President of El Salvador (b. 1849)

== Tuesday, June 17, 1919 ==
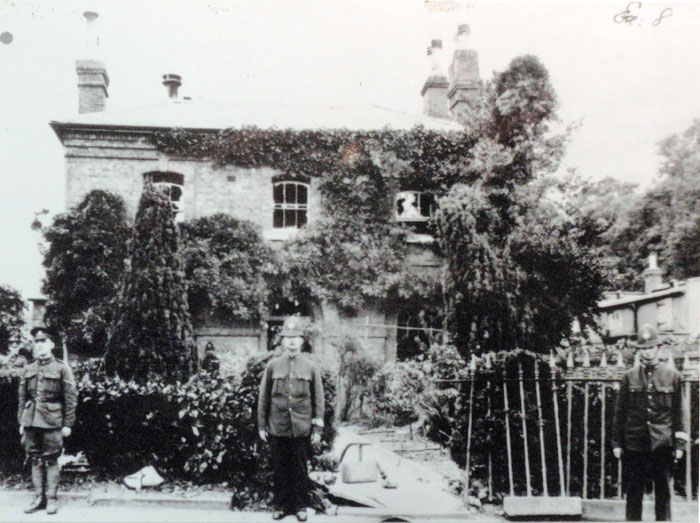
Police officers guard Epsom Police Station in England after the rioting Canadian soldiers attacked the station.

- Greek soldiers massacred 200 ethnic Turkish civilians, and wounded 200 more, at the town of Menemen, İzmir Province, Turkey. The dead included mayor Kaymakam Kemal Bey.
- Some 400 soldiers with the Canadian Army rioted and assaulted the police station in Epsom, England in an attempt to release one of their own members who was incarcerated. Sixteen English police officers were involved in defending the station, with eleven injured and another dying from a head injury the following day. Eight Canadian soldiers were later arrested and put on trial, with four convicted of manslaughter. Their sentences were commuted by the Prince of Wales and all were allowed to return to Canada.
- Illinois had to reconfirm ratification of women's suffrage due to the error in the text of the initial resolution, but still retained the prestige of being the first U.S. state to ratify the 19th Amendment.
- The 139th Aero Squadron of the United States Army Air Service was disbanded at Hazelhurst Field, Mineola, New York.
- The comic strip Barney Google and Snuffy Smith, created by Billy DeBeck, debuted in the Chicago Herald and Chicago Examiner.
- Born:
  - Beryl Reid, English actress, known for her film roles including The Killing of Sister George and television roles including Smiley's People, recipient of the Tony Award for Best Actress in a Play for The Killing of Sister George; in Hereford, England (d. 1996)
  - Kingman Brewster Jr., American diplomat and academic, 17th President of Yale University, U.S. Ambassador to the United Kingdom from 1977 to 1981; in Longmeadow, Massachusetts, United States (d. 1988)
  - Herbert Gentry, American painter, noted ex-pat of the Expressionism movement in Europe; in Pittsburgh, United States (d. 2003)
- Died: Pierre, Duke of Penthièvre, 73, French noble, naval officer for the United States Navy and French Navy, grandson to Louis Philippe I (b. 1845)

== Wednesday, June 18, 1919 ==
- White Russian forces under command of Yakov Slashchov landed at Koktebel, Crimea and forced the government of the Crimean Socialist Soviet Republic to flee the capital of Simferopol.
- German Rear-Admiral Ludwig von Reuter circulated an order among the remaining 1,700 sailors of the High Seas Fleet interned at Scapa Flow to scuttle all the remaining 74 ships of the fleet rather than have them handed over to the Allies should Germany sign the proposed peace treaty at the Paris Peace Conference, tentatively scheduled for June 21 (but postponed later to June 28).
- The Dáil Éireann established the National Arbitration Courts in Ireland.
- Winnipeg general strike – Eight strike leaders were arrested, with seven members brought to trial and convicted of political crimes, including future politicians J. S. Woodsworth, George Armstrong, William Ivens, and John Queen, the future Mayor of Winnipeg.
- The Liga Deportiva Alajuelense was founded in Costa Rica, becoming the biggest football club in Central America.
- Zionist leader Isaac Leib Goldberg began publishing the Hebrew newspaper Hadashot Ha'aretz (News of the Land), later known as Haaretz, in Jerusalem.

== Thursday, June 19, 1919 ==
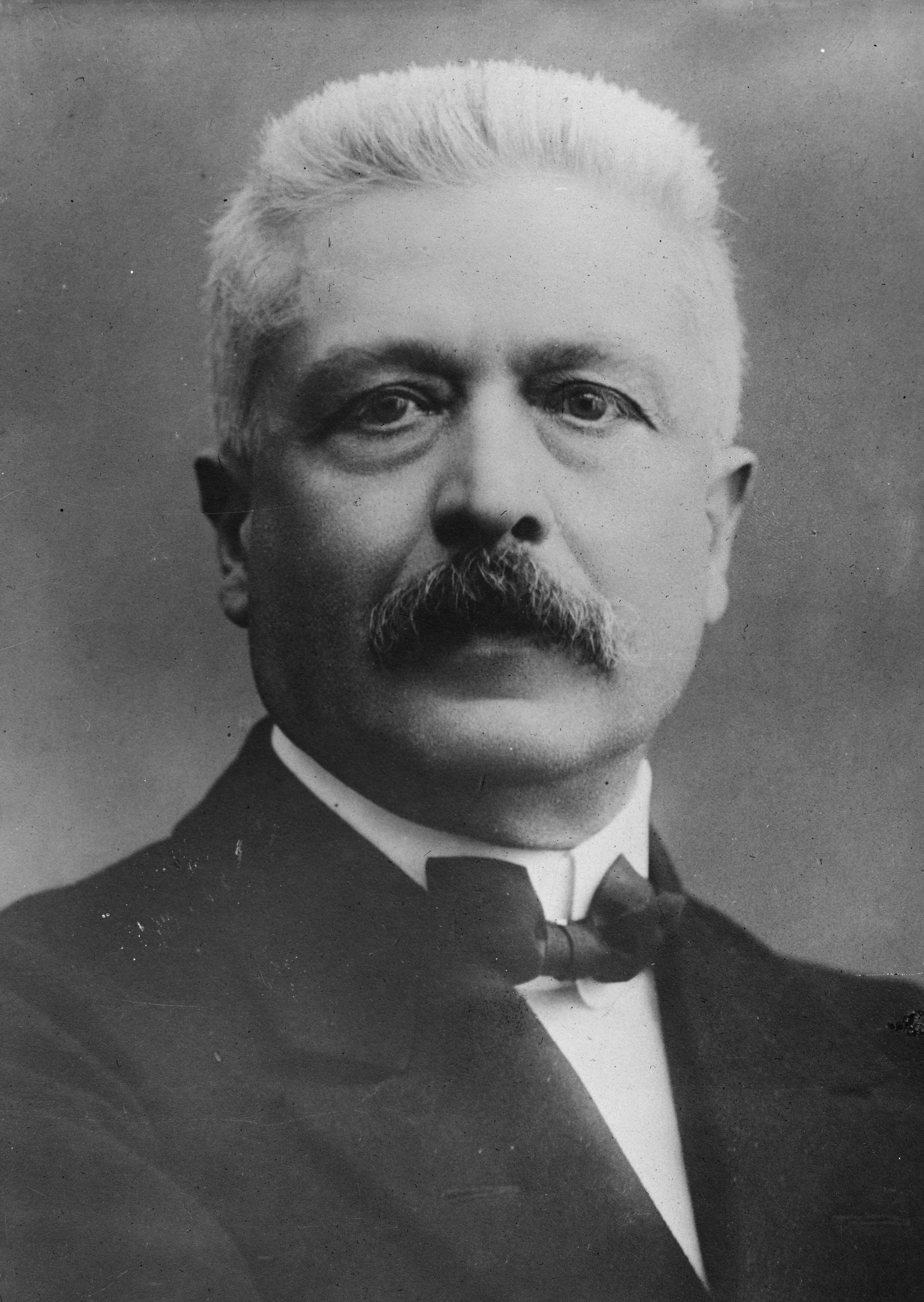
Vittorio Emanuele Orlando, Prime Minister of Italy

- Battle of Cēsis – Estonian and Latvian forces attacked the Baltische Landeswehr near Cēsis, Latvia, in what would be the decisive battle for the Estonian and Latvian wars for independence.
- Italian Prime Minister Vittorio Emanuele Orlando resigned and dissolved his cabinet following his inability to acquire the Croatian city of Fiume for Italy in the peace settlement at the Paris Peace Conference, despite 90% of the population being ethnic Italian.
- The Pennsylvania State Senate ratified the 19th Amendment.
- National Workers Bank was established by trade unions and the Social Democrats of Denmark in Copenhagen to become the country's seventh largest bank.
- The football club Salernitana was established in Salerno, Italy.
- Born: Pauline Kael, American film critic, best known for her film columns in The New Yorker, author of I Lost It at the Movies and Raising Kane; in Petaluma, California, United States (d. 2001)
- Died: Petre P. Carp, 81, Romanian state leader and author, 21st Prime Minister of Romania, co-founder of the Junimea club (b. 1837)

== Friday, June 20, 1919 ==
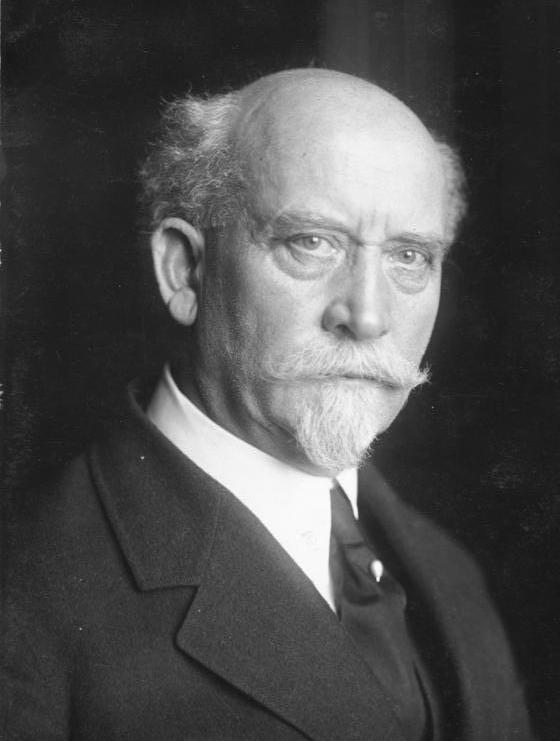
Chancellor Philipp Scheidemann resigns

- Chancellor Philipp Scheidemann resigned from his position as head of the Weimar Republic in Germany and dissolved his government in protest over the Allied ultimatum to accept the draft of the peace treaty submitted by the Paris Peace Conference.
- Battle of Cēsis – The Baltische Landeswehr attempted to capture Limbaži, Latvia, held by Estonian and Latvian forces but achieved only limited success.
- Five sailors serving on the Royal Australian Navy battlecruiser HMAS Australia were charged with leading a mutiny on June 1 when the ship was anchored in Fremantle, Australia, but public sympathy forced the navy to reduce sentences for the participants in September.
- Hazel Hotchkiss Wightman won her fourth national title, defeating Marion Zinderstein 6–1, 6–2 in the women's singles at the U.S. National Championships. However, Zinderstein defeated Wightman in women's doubles, when she and partner Eleanor Goss defeated Wightman and her partner Eleonora Sears 10–8 and 9–7. Zinderstein also won mixed doubles with partner Vincent Richards, defeating Florence Ballin and Bill Tilden 2–6, 11–9, 6–2.
- Roy W. Allen opened a root beer and burger stand in Lodi, California. In four years, he partnered with one of his employees and opened the first A&W Restaurant in Sacramento, California.
- Three football clubs were established the same day in Europe: Elinkwijk in Utrecht, Netherlands, Lavagnese in Lavagna, Italy, and Skövde in Skövde, Sweden.
- Born: Anna Mac Clarke, American army officer, first African American female commanding officer for the Women's Army Corps; in Lexington, Kentucky, United States (d. 1944)
- Died: William Stephen Devery, 65, American law enforcer, first police chief of the New York City Police Department (b. 1854)

== Saturday, June 21, 1919 ==
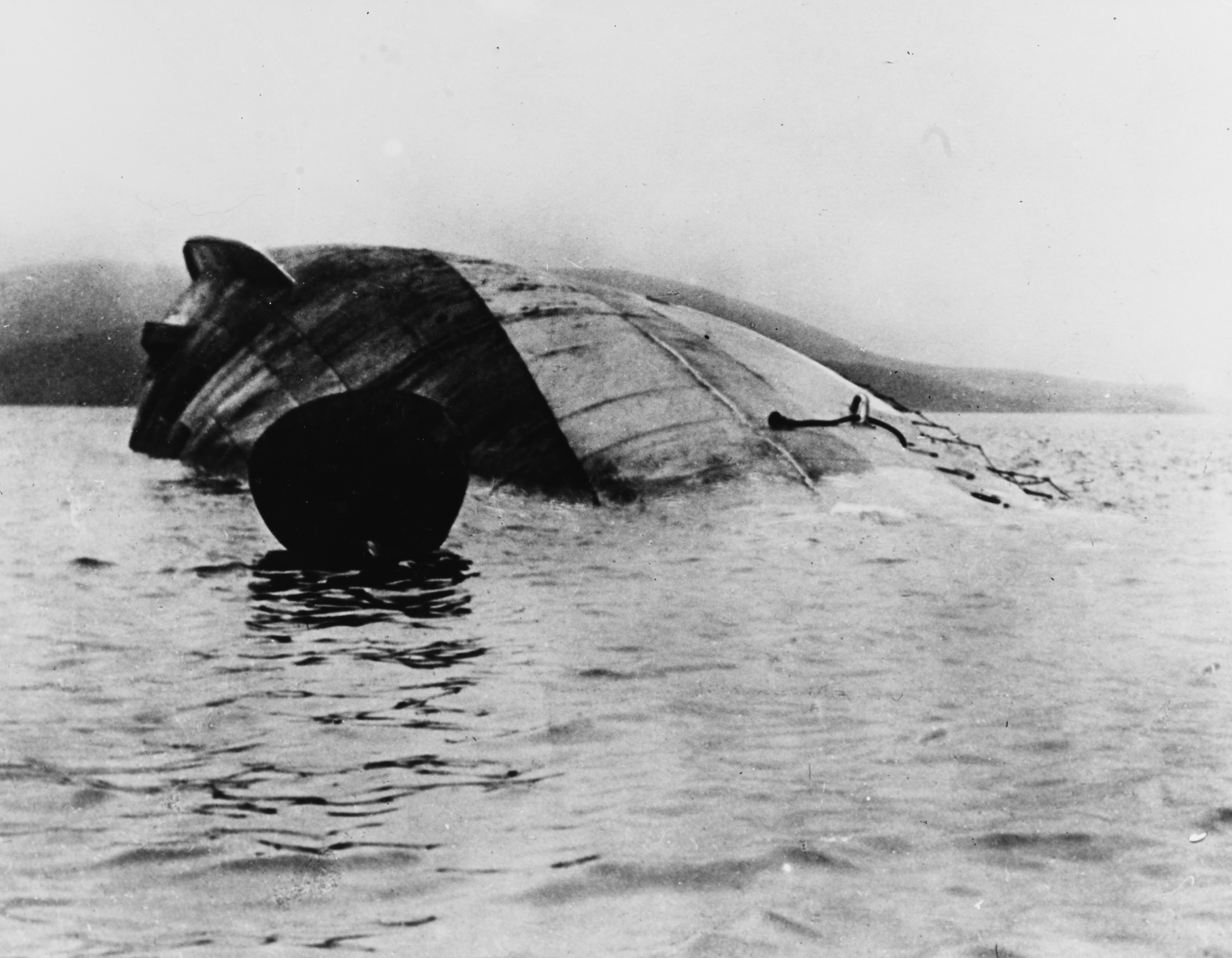
Seydlitz on her side after being scuttled.

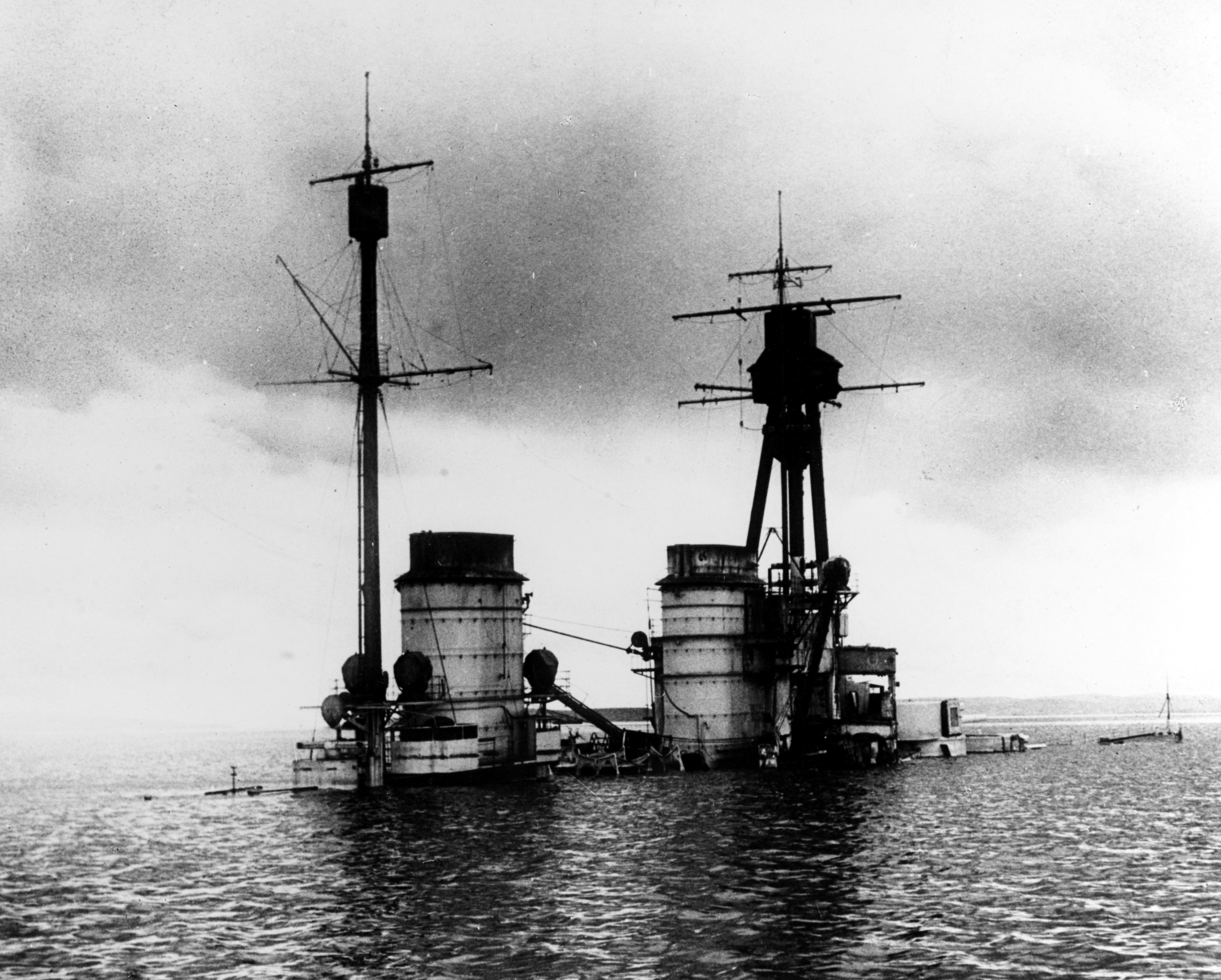
Only the upper works of Hindenburg remained above the water after being scuttled.

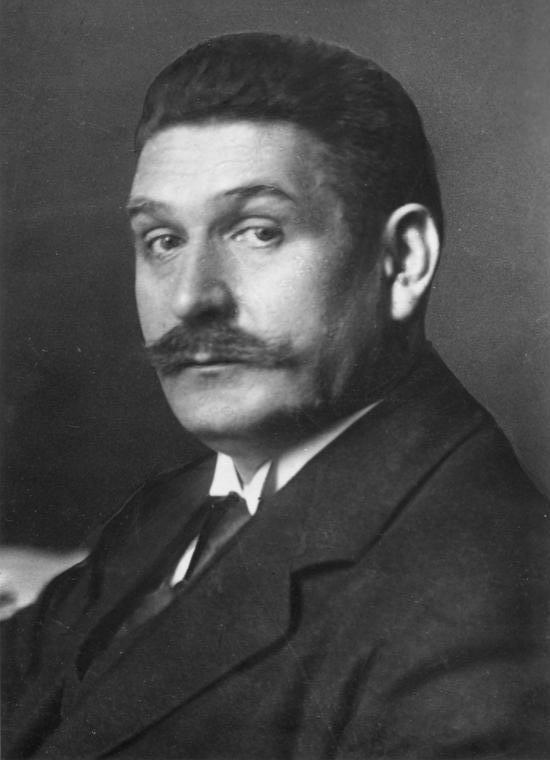
Gustav Bauer, new Chancellor of Germany

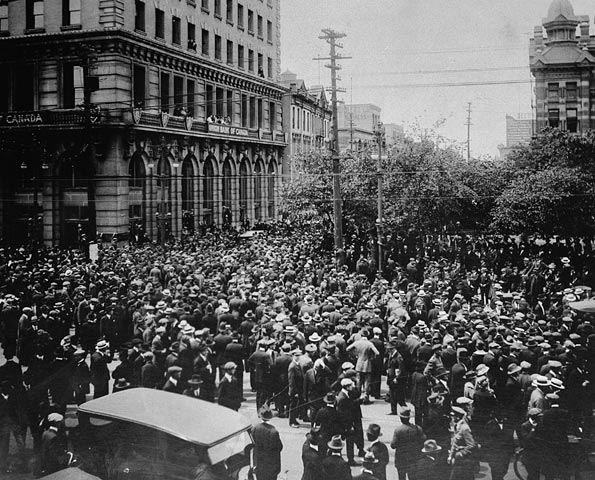
Crowd of strikers in downtown Winnipeg, before broken up by police.

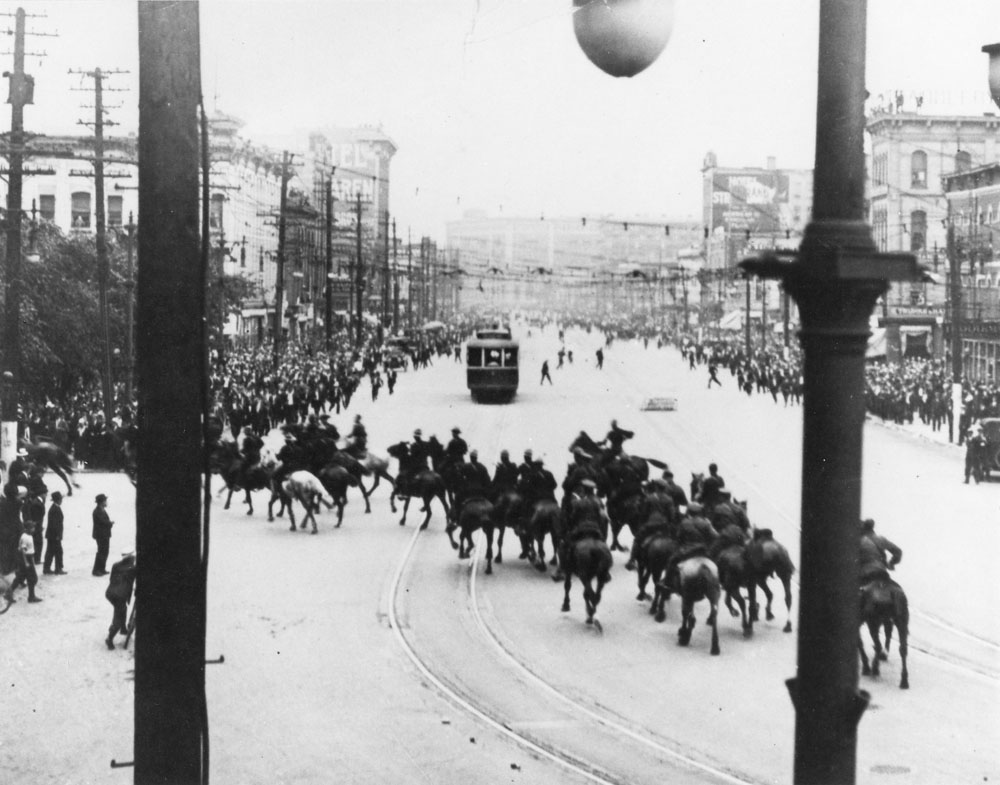
Police on horseback in Winnipeg during the Winnipeg general strike.

- German Rear-Admiral Ludwig von Reuter ordered the entire German High Seas Fleet interned in Scapa Flow off the coast of Scotland to be scuttled rather than have the ships seized by the Allies under the terms negotiated at the Paris Peace Conference. Before a Royal Navy squadron could intervene, 15 flag ships were sunk along with 32 destroyers and four light cruisers. Nine German sailors retreating from the sinking ships in lifeboats were shot and killed by the Royal Navy and another 16 were wounded. A total 1,774 German sailors were picked up and transported to Royal Navy battleships. Well known German battleships destroyed included:
  - SMS Baden
  - SMS Bayern
  - SMS Bremse
  - SMS Brummer
  - SMS Cöln
  - SMS Dresden
  - SMS Derfflinger
  - SMS Emden
  - SMS Frankfurt
  - SMS Friedrich der Grosse
  - SMS Hindenburg
  - SMS Grosser Kurfürst
  - SMS Kaiser
  - SMS Kaiserin
  - SMS Karlsruhe
  - SMS König
  - SMS König Albert
  - SMS Kronprinz
  - SMS Markgraf
  - SMS Moltke
  - SMS Nürnberg
  - SMS Prinzregent Luitpold
  - SMS Seydlitz
  - SMS Von der Tann
- Gustav Bauer formed a government for Germany following the resignation of the Philipp Scheidemann administration the previous day.
- Battle of Cēsis – The Baltische Landeswehr launched their main attack against Latvia and Estonia, breaking through the Latvian defense line before Estonian reinforcements halted their advance.
- Winnipeg general strike – Royal Northwest Mounted Police fired a volley of bullets into a crowd of 30,000 strikers protesting the arrest of the strike leaders, killing two and injuring between 35 and 45 people, in what was later referred to as "Bloody Saturday".
- The fourth annual Aerial Derby was held in London, the first since the start of World War I. Sixteen participants flew over the same 94-mile (151-kilometer) circuit used previously, but did it twice since aircraft were now faster than in 1915. The overall winner was G. Gathergood, who completed the race in 1 hour 27 minutes 42 seconds in an Airco aircraft with no handicap. H. A. Hammersley won the handicap competition in an Avro Baby with a time of 2 hours 41 minutes 23 seconds.
- Born:
  - Paolo Soleri, Italian-American architect, founder of the Cosanti foundation, designer of the experimental town of Arcosanti, Arizona; in Turin, Kingdom of Italy (present-day Italy) (d. 2013)
  - Ernie Blandin, American football player, tackle for the Cleveland Browns and Baltimore Colts from 1946 to 1953; in Augusta, Kansas, United States (d. 1968)
  - Forest K. Ferguson, American football player, defensive end for the Florida Gators football team from 1939 to 1941; in South Jacksonville, Florida, United States (d. 1954)
- Died:
  - Franz von Liszt, 68, German judge, promoter and developer of international law (b. 1851)
  - Gustaf Retzius, 76, Swedish physician, noted for his research into the nervous system (b. 1842)

== Sunday, June 22, 1919 ==
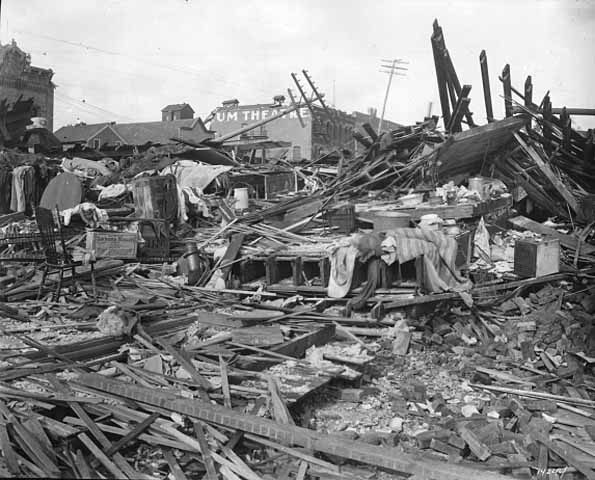
Damage from tornado in Fergus Falls, Minnesota.

- A tornado struck Fergus Falls, Minnesota, killing 57 people and causing $4 million in damages. It would be the second deadliest tornado in the state's history.
- German Chancellor Gustav Bauer sent a telegram to the Paris Peace Conference saying Germany would sign a peace treaty provided certain articles detrimental to Germany's security and economy were removed. The Allies responded with an ultimatum that if the treaty was not signed, Allied forces would cross the Rhine within 24 hours.
- The Inter-Allied Games were held in the newly built Pershing Stadium at Bois de Vincennes, just outside Paris, with over 1,500 military athletes from 18 nations competing. The United States dominated the games with 18 wins.
- Willingdon College was established in Sangli, India, named after former Governor of India Lord Willingdon.
- The British Drama League held its inaugural meeting at Theatre Royal in Haymarket, London, England.
- The football club Hünfelder SV was established in Hünfeld, Germany.
- Born:
  - Henri Tajfel, Polish-British psychologist, known for his research into social identity theory and prejudice, founding member of the European Association of Social Psychology; as Hersz Mordche Tajfel, in Włocławek, Poland (d. 1982)
  - Gower Champion, American choreographer and film director, known his collaboration with wife Marge Champion on film musicals including Mr. Music and Show Boat; in Geneva, Illinois, United States (d. 1980)

== Monday, June 23, 1919 ==
- Battle of Cēsis – The Estonian Army launched a successful counterattack against the Baltische Landeswehr, recapturing Cēsis, Latvia, and forcing the pro-German force to retreat towards Riga. The Landeswehr suffered 274 casualties. The Estonians sustained more casualties than the Latvians, with 110 dead and 295 wounded, compared the Latvians who only lost 13 dead and 30 wounded. The battle proved so decisive in maintaining an independent Estonia and Latvia that the date is commemorated as Victory Day in Estonia.
- Francesco Saverio Nitti became the Prime Minister of Italy and formed a new government. His replacement of outgoing Prime Minister Vittorio Emanuele Orlando was notable as the two leaders had a long-standing rivalry within their party.
- Faced with a prospect of a new war against the Allies, German Chancellor Gustav Bauer sent another telegram confirming a German delegation would travel to Paris to sign a peace treaty.
- The White Russian Volunteer Army began a series of pogroms against Jewish communities around Kiev, starting with the Jewish village of Skvira, Ukraine, where insurgents killed 45 people and raped 35 women.
- The first and only elections were held in the First Republic of Armenia, with the Armenian Revolutionary Federation winning a majority of the seats. Voter turnout was 71% despite the election being boycotted by the Social Democrat Hunchakian Party and Armenian Populist Party. Women voted for the first time and three female candidates were elected to office, including Perchuhi Partizpanyan-Barseghyan.
- Lomer Gouin was elected to his fourth term as Premier of Quebec, defeating challenger Arthur Sauvé in the Quebec provincial election.
- Many of the surviving German Zeppelins from World War I were destroyed by their own crews in order to prevent them from falling into Allied hands. Out of the 84 built for the war, 60 had been destroyed.
- The 4th Aero Squadron of the United States Army Air Service was reactivated at Hazelhurst Field in New York before it was eventually mobilized in Hawaii.
- The 39th staging of the Wimbledon Championships were held in London after a four-year hiatus due to World War I.
- The Museum of Western and Oriental Art in Kiev was given state museum status to house the art collection donated by the estate of Bogdan Khanenko, the largest collection of foreign art in Ukraine.
- The Women's Engineering Society was established in London to address the growing number of women entering the engineering field.
- Several rail stations were reopened in England after being closed down during World War I, including stations in Coalbrookdale.
- The Poplar Recreation Ground Memorial was unveiled by Major General Edward Ashmore, commander of London Air Defence Area, on East India Dock Road in Poplar, London as a memorial to the 18 schoolchildren killed in the first daylight German bombing raid in 1917.
- Born:
  - Mohamed Boudiaf, Algerian state leader, 4th President of Algeria; in Ouled Madhi, Algeria (d. 1992, assassinated)
  - Lafayette G. Pool, American army officer, tank commander with the 32nd Armored Regiment during World War II, recipient of the Distinguished Service Cross, Legion of Merit, and Silver Star; in Odem, Texas, United States (d. 1991)

== Tuesday, June 24, 1919 ==
- The Social Democratic Party of Hungary attempted but failed to overthrow the government of the Hungarian Soviet Republic.
- The Pennsylvania House of Representatives ratified the 19th Amendment, making it the seventh state to endorse extending voting rights to women.
- Born:
  - Al Molinaro, American actor, best known for his television comedy roles on Happy Days and The Odd Couple; as Umberto Francesco Molinaro, in Kenosha, Wisconsin, United States (d. 2015)
  - Earl E. Anderson, American marine officer, Assistant Commandant of the Marine Corps from 1972 to 1975, recipient of the Legion of Merit, Distinguished Flying Cross, and Bronze Star Medal; in Morgantown, West Virginia, United States (d. 2015)

== Wednesday, June 25, 1919 ==
- Massachusetts House of Representatives ratified the 19th Amendment by a vote of 185 in favor and 47 against and the Massachusetts Senate by 34 for and 5 against, making the state the eighth to ratify the federal amendment.
- Winnipeg general strike – The general strike committee voted to end the strike and call on all 30,000 strikers to return to work.
- An American platoon of 72 men repelled an attack by a Red Army force of 400 men at their base camp in Romanovka, Siberia, Russia, killing between 41 and 57 Russian soldiers while suffering 24 killed and 25 wounded.
- The 1st Ukrainian Soviet Army was disbanded and became part of the 12th Red Army.
- The world's first all-metal commercial airplane, the Junker, flew for the first time.
- The Genetics Society was established in London by biologists William Bateson and Edith Rebecca Saunders to become the longest running society dedicated to the study of genetics.
- The weekly newspaper Australian Town and Country Journal released its final issue in Sydney after nearly 50 years of publication.
- Football club Eendracht Aalst was established in Aalst, Belgium.
- The village of Minburn, Alberta, was incorporated.

== Thursday, June 26, 1919 ==
- White Russian forces occupied all of Crimea.
- British Foreign Office official St John Philby and T. E. Lawrence were flown into Cairo for discussions about Arab unrest in Egypt by Canadian pilot Harry Yates in a Handley Page bomber.
- American publisher Joseph Medill Patterson founded the Illustrated Daily News, the first tabloid newspaper in New York City. It was eventually renamed the New York Daily News and became the ninth most widely circulated newspaper in the United States.
- Born:
  - Freddie Mills, English boxer, World Light Heavyweight Champion from 1948 to 1950; in Bournemouth, England (d. 1965, suicide)
  - M. Brewster Smith, American psychologist, promoter of deinstitutionalisation in mental health services, famously argued against racial segregation in education in Brown v. Board of Education; as Mahlon Brewster Smith, in Syracuse, New York, United States (d. 2012)
- Died: William Martin Murphy, 74, Irish publisher, founder of the Sunday Independent, leader of employer's syndicate in the Dublin lock-out (b. 1844)

== Friday, June 27, 1919 ==
- American entrepreneur Marcus Garvey established the Black Star Line as the first shipping line run by African Americans.
- The Lithuanian Riflemen's Union was established as a paramilitary nonprofit organization specializing in weapons training and sport shooting.
- The weekly journal Irish Statesman began publication as the mouthpiece for the Irish Dominion League. Edited by Warre B. Wells, the magazine received contributions from leading Irish literary figures including W. B. Yeats, George Bernard Shaw, and George William Russell.
- Born: Howard Leeds, Canadian-American television producer, known for popular television shows The Brady Bunch, Diff'rent Strokes, The Facts of Life and Small Wonder; in Winnipeg, Canada (d. 2017)

== Saturday, June 28, 1919 ==
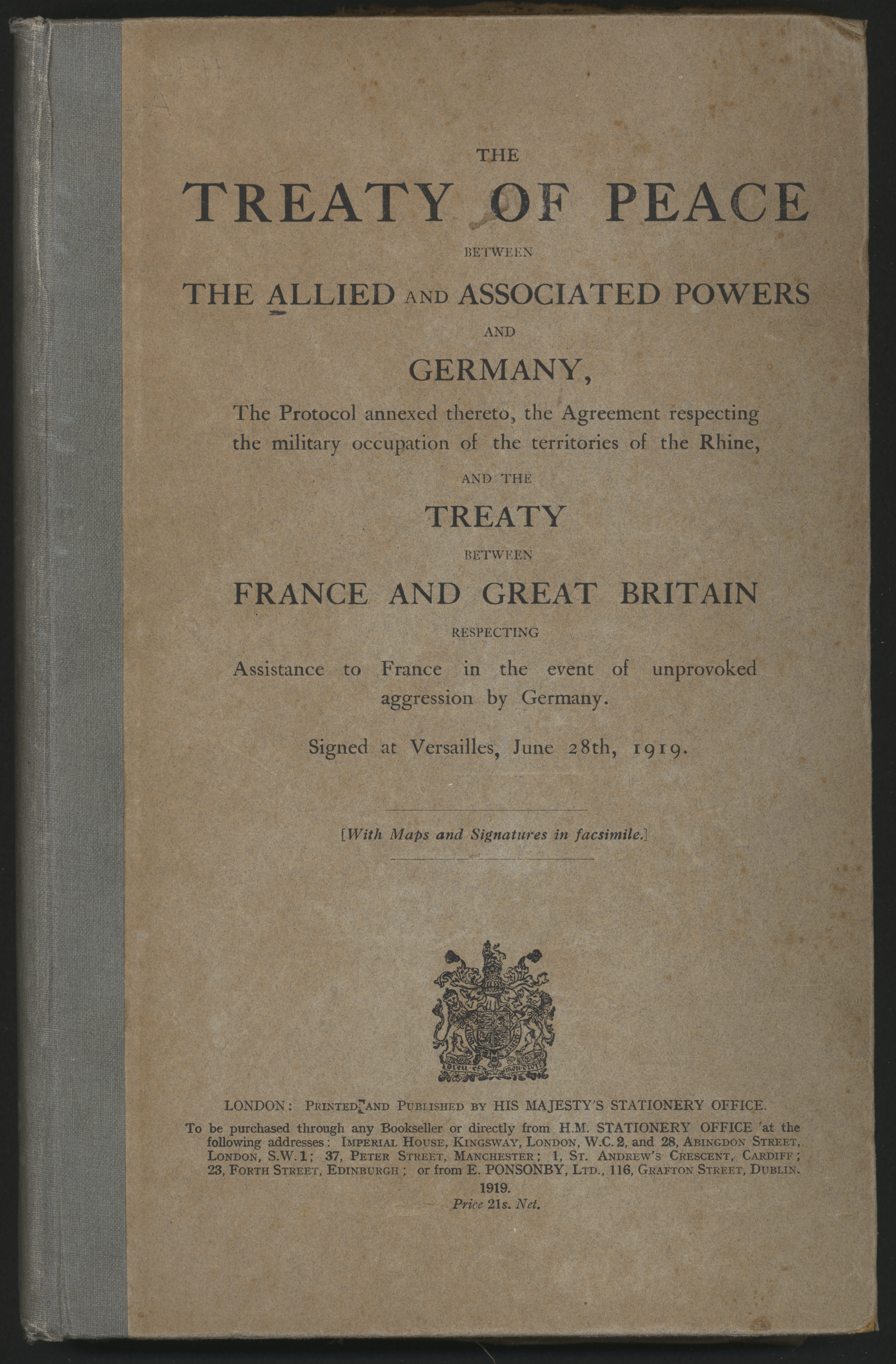
English version of the Treaty of Versailles, formally ending World War I.

- The Treaty of Versailles was signed at the Paris Peace Conference to formally end all international hostilities between the Allies and the Central Powers, exactly five years after the assassination of Archduke Franz Ferdinand led directly to World War I. With the signing of the treaty, the following conditions occurred:
  - The charter of the Covenant of the League of Nations was established.
  - Germany gave up 25,000 square miles (65,000 km^{2}) of territory and 7 million people, most notably losing the Greater Poland region to Poland, the Alsace–Lorraine region to France, and having East Prussia cut off from Germany when the port city of Danzig was ceded to Polish control.
  - The former German African colonies fell under Allied control through the League of Nations mandate, with Togoland and Kamerun to France, Ruanda-Urundi to Belgium, German South West Africa to South Africa and German East Africa to the United Kingdom. As well, the German colonies in the Pacific Ocean were divided up with German New Guinea going to Australia, German Samoa to New Zealand, and Palau and other islands to Japan.
  - Germany accepted responsibility for the damages and losses caused by the war and would make reparation payments to the Allies; the Reparations Committee in 1921 would set total reparation payments to 20 billion gold marks or $5 billion in gold.
  - The Little Treaty of Versailles was signed between Poland and the League of Nations, the first of many Minority Treaties to be signed between the intergovernmental organization and countries signing on for membership.
  - The International Labour Organization was established, becoming an agency of the League of Nations and eventually of the United Nations.
  - The First International Opium Convention, signed originally in 1912, became the first internationally enforced drug control treaty until it was superseded in 1961 by the Single Convention on Narcotic Drugs.
  - The British Summary Court was established with the Inter-Allied Rhineland High Commission to oversee Allied occupation of the Rhineland in Germany.
- The Texas House of Representatives ratified the 19th Amendment, making it the ninth state to approve women's suffrage.
- The 11th Northern Division of the British Army was disbanded.
- The 5th Light Horse Regiment was disbanded after returning to Australia.
- The sports club Maribor was established in Maribor, Slovenia.
- The football club Zeeburgia was established in Amsterdam.
- Born: Edward John Carnell, American theologian, second President of the Fuller Theological Seminary, member of the Evangelicalism movement in the United States; in Antigo, Wisconsin, United States (d. 1967)

== Sunday, June 29, 1919 ==
- Voters in Switzerland rejected granting women the right to vote.
- The Tour de France began after a four-year absence due to World War I.
- The West Virginia State Police was established.
- The Polish Chemical Society was established in Warsaw.
- Born:
  - Slim Pickens, American actor, best known for comedic film roles in Dr. Strangelove and Blazing Saddles; as Louis Burton Lindley Jr., in Kingsburg, California, United States (d. 1983)
  - Maurice Britt, American army officer, commander of Company K, 3rd Battalion, 30th Infantry Regiment during World War II, recipient of the Medal of Honor, Distinguished Service Cross, Silver Star, and Bronze Star Medal; in Carlisle, Arkansas, United States (d. 1995)
  - Ernesto Corripio y Ahumada, Mexican clergy, Archbishop of Mexico City from 1977 to 1994; in Tampico, Mexico (d. 2008)
- Died: José Gregorio Hernández, 54, Venezuelan physician, known for his charitable medical work for the poor in Venezuela; killed in a vehicle accident (b. 1864)

== Monday, June 30, 1919 ==
- The ANZAC Mounted Division was disbanded after the last units returned to Australia and New Zealand.
- The Auckland, Canterbury, and Wellington Mounted Rifles Regiments were disbanded after leaving the Suez Canal for New Zealand.
- The 33rd Infantry Division of the British Army was disbanded.
- The Tottenham Royal Engineers of the British Army was disbanded.
- The 100th, 186th, 213th, and 354th Aero Squadrons of the United States Army Air Service were disbanded at Hazelhurst Field in Mineola, New York.
- The Eastlake Avenue Bridge in Seattle was renamed University Bridge. It was opened earlier in the year to traffic.
- Conrad Veidt starred in his first noteworthy film Different from the Others opposite Reinhold Schünzel, written, produced and directed by Richard Oswald. Its open stance against German laws against homosexuality made it one of the first pro-gay films released.
- Born:
  - Ed Yost, American inventor, developed the modern hot air balloon; as Paul Edward Yost, in Bristow, Iowa, United States (d. 2007)
  - Din Joe Buckley, Irish Gaelic football player, left corner-back for the Glen Rovers from 1938 to 1949; as Denis Joseph Buckley, in Blackpool, Cork, Ireland (d. 2009)
- Died:
  - John William Strutt, 76, English physicist, recipient of the Nobel Prize in Physics for the discovery of argon and the concept of Rayleigh scattering (b. 1842)
  - Vladimir Guerrier, 82, Russian historian, promoter of academic education for women, founder of the Moscow State Pedagogical University (b. 1837)
