= The Gorge railway station =

The Gorge railway station is the name of at least two railway stations:

- The Gorge railway station, New South Wales, on the Broken Hill Line in New South Wales, Australia
- The Gorge railway station, New Zealand, on the Palmerston North - Gisborne Line in the North Island of New Zealand
