= The Leven Lever =

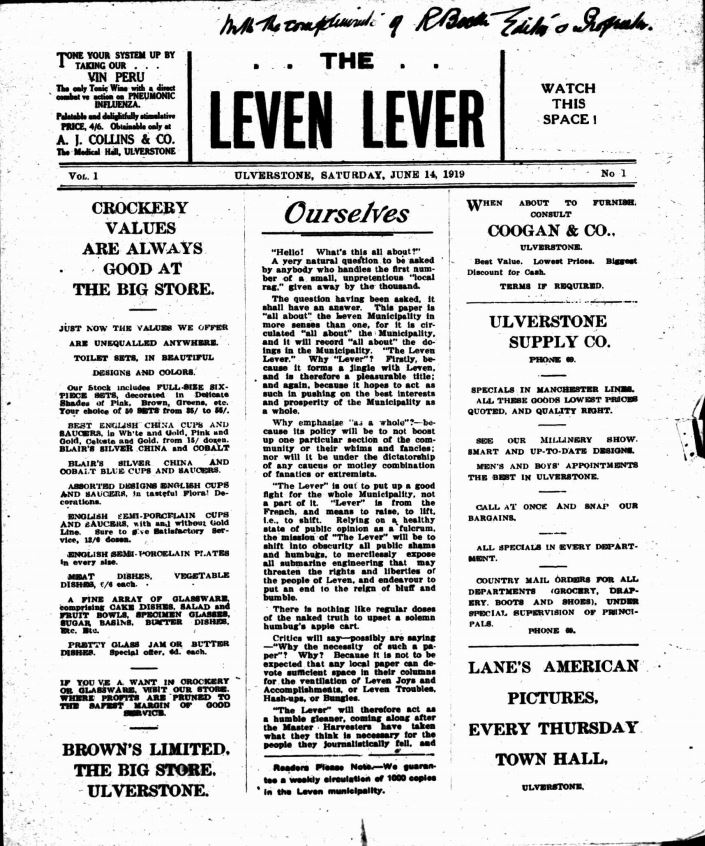
Front page of The Leven Lever, 14 June 1919

The Leven Lever was a newspaper published in Ulverstone, Tasmania, from 1919 to 1920.

== History ==
The Leven Lever was published weekly. The first edition was published on 14 June 1919 and the newspaper ran until its last edition on 11 December 1920. It was a free community newspaper distributed in the Ulverstone, formerly Leven, Tasmania, municipality on the north west coast of Tasmania.

== Digitisation ==
This paper has been digitised as part of the Australian Newspapers Digitisation Program of the National Library of Australia.

== See also ==
- List of newspapers in Australia
