= Mount Gipps railway station =

Former railway station in New South Wales, Australia

Coordinates: 31.8991°S 141.6014°E

Mount Gipps is a closed railway station on the Broken Hill railway line in New South Wales, Australia, approximately 7 km east of Broken Hill. The station opened in 1919 and closed in 1974. Only the platform face remains. It was located at the historic Mount Gipps Station, one of the first properties settled west of the Darling River in the 1860s.

Preceding station	Former services	Following station
Broken Hill Terminus	Broken Hill Line	The Gorge towards Orange
