= Daegu Metropolitan Jungang Library =

Library in Daegu, South Korea

Coordinates: 35°52′06″N 128°36′06″E

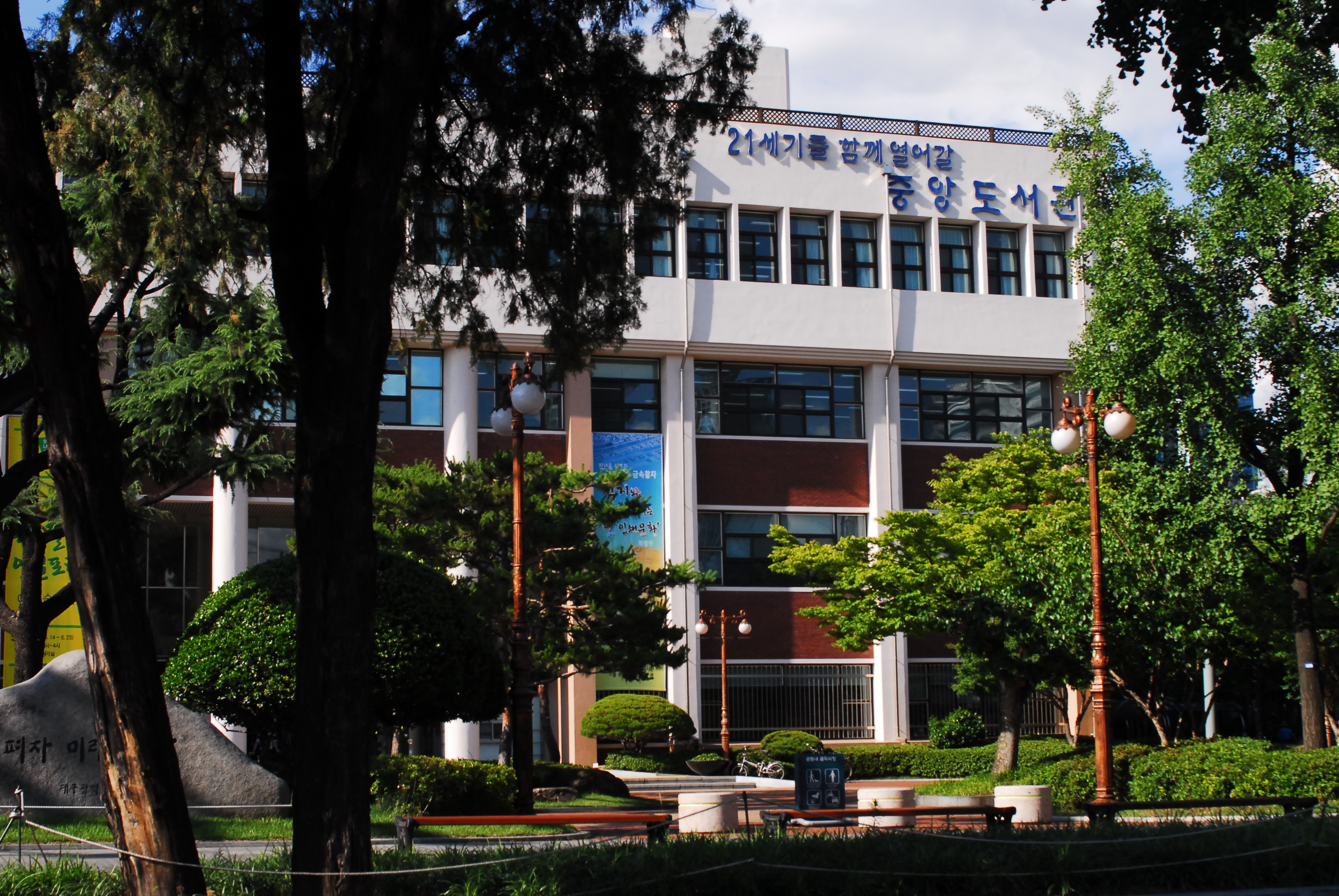

Korean name
- Hangul: 대구광역시립중앙도서관
- Hanja: 大邱廣域市立中央圖書館
- Revised Romanization: Daegu-gwangyeoksirip-jungang-doseogwan
- McCune–Reischauer: Taegu-gwangyŏksirip-chungang-dosŏgwan

Daegu Metropolitan Jungang Library is a municipal library in Jung District, Daegu, South Korea. It opened on 10 August 1919. The collection currently consists of 469,559 books and 34,236 papers.
