= The Gorge railway station, New South Wales =

Former railway station in New South Wales, Australia

The Gorge

General information
- Location: Australia
- Coordinates: 31.9128°S 141.6787°E
- Line: Broken Hill railway line, New South Wales

History
- Opened: 1919
- Closed: 1971

Services
Preceding station	Former services	Following station
Mount Gipps towards Broken Hill	Broken Hill Line	Wahratta towards Orange
Location

The Gorge is a closed railway station on the Broken Hill railway line in New South Wales, Australia. The station opened in 1919 and closed in 1971.
