= Raymonde de Laroche =

French, world's first female pilot (1882–1919)

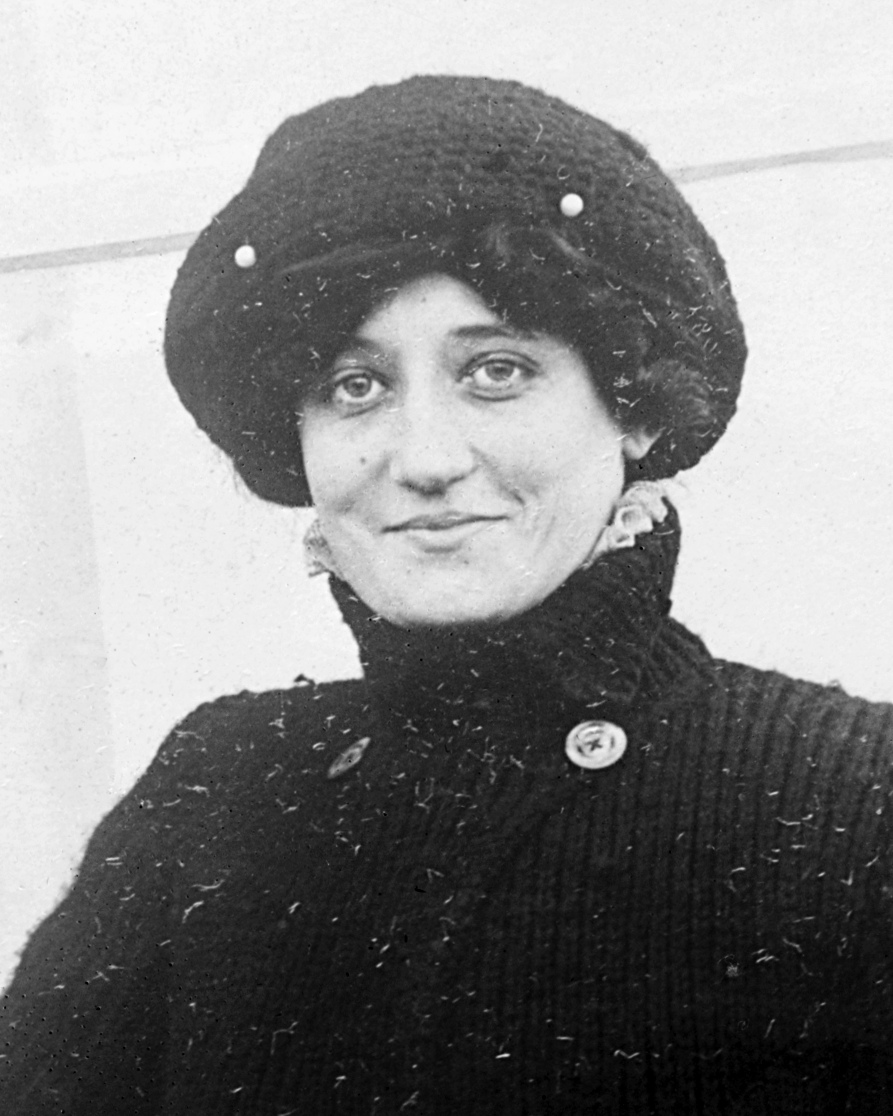
- de Laroche in 1909
- Born: Elise Raymonde Deroche; 22 August 1882; Paris, France
- Died: 18 July 1919 (aged 36); Le Crotoy airfield, France
- Occupation: Aviator

Raymonde de Laroche (22 August 1882 – 18 July 1919) was a French pilot who became the world's first licensed female pilot on 8 March 1910. She is thought to be the first woman to pilot a plane.

She received the 36th aeroplane pilot's licence issued by the Aeroclub de France, the world's first organization to issue pilot licences. At the time, pilot licences were only required for pilots operating aircraft for commercial purposes.

== Early life ==
Born on 22 August 1882 in Paris, France, as Elise Raymonde Deroche, de Laroche was the daughter of a plumber. She had a fondness for sports as a child, as well as for motorcycles and automobiles when she was older. As a young woman she became an actress and used the stage name "Raymonde de Laroche". She was inspired by Wilbur Wright's 1908 demonstrations of powered flight in Paris and was personally acquainted with several aviators, including artist-turned-aviator Léon Delagrange, who was reputed to be the father of her son André. Due to all of these inspirations, De Laroche was determined to take up flying for herself.

== Achievements in aviation ==
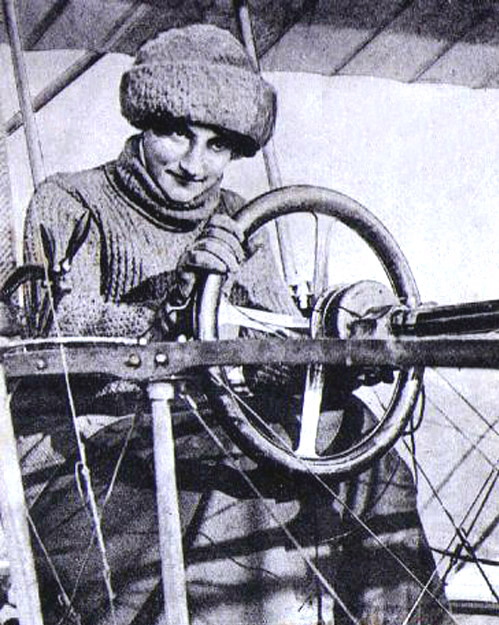
de Laroche in her Voisin aeroplane in 1909

In October 1909, de Laroche appealed to her friend, aviator and aeroplane builder Charles Voisin to instruct her in how to fly. On 22 October 1909, de Laroche went to the Voisin brothers' base of operations at Chalons, 90 miles (140 km) east of Paris. Voisin's aircraft could seat only one person, so she operated the plane by herself while he stood on the ground and gave instructions. After she mastered taxiing around the airfield, she lifted off and flew 300 yards (270 m). De Laroche's flight is often cited as the first by a woman in a powered heavier-than-air craft; there is evidence that two other women, P. Van Pottelsberghe and Thérèse Peltier, had flown the previous year with Henri Farman and Delagrange respectively as passengers but not as pilots.

Decades later, aviation journalist Harry Harper wrote that until de Laroche made her celebrated flight on the Voisin, she had only flown once, for a short hop, as a passenger. When she first took the controls, Charles Voisin expressly forbade her to attempt a flight; after taxiing twice across the airfield, she took off, flying "ten or fifteen feet high" and handling the controls with "cool, quick precision".

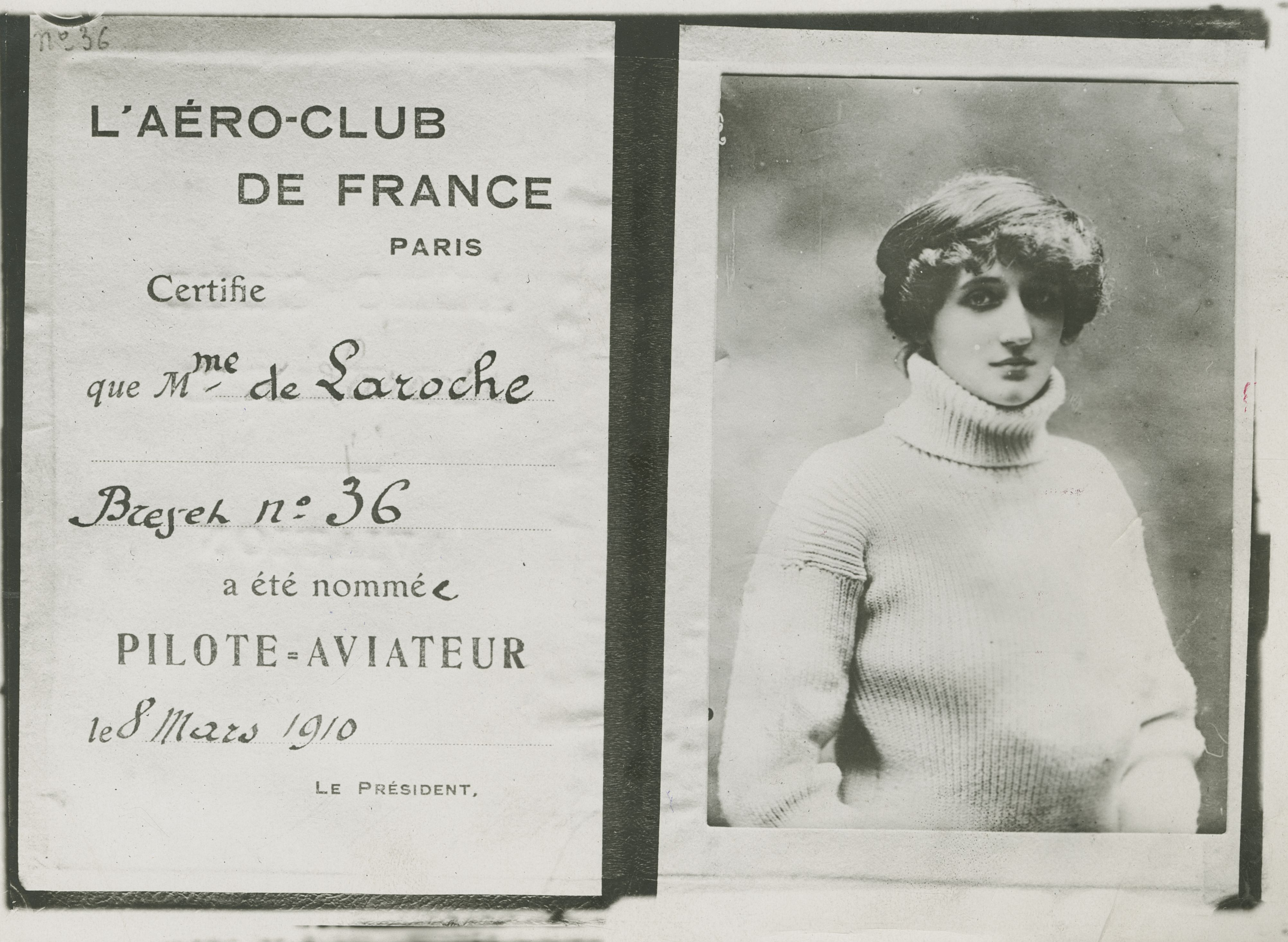
De Laroche's pilot's license

Although Gabriel Voisin wrote, "... my brother [was] entirely under her thumb", the story of de Laroche as a headstrong woman making the flight after scant preparation and against Voisin's orders almost certainly romanticises what took place. Flight magazine, a week after the flight, reported: "For some time the Baroness has been taking lessons from M. Chateau, the Voisin instructor, at Chalons, and on Friday of last week she was able to take the wheel for the first time. This initial voyage into the air was only a very short one, and terra firma was regained after 300 yards (270 m)." Flight was also responsible for bestowing the title "Baroness" upon de Laroche, as she was not of noble birth. Flight added that on the following day she circled the flying field twice, "the turnings being made with consummate ease. During this flight of about four miles (6 km) there was a strong gusty wind blowing, but after the first two turnings the Baroness said that it did not bother her, as she had the machine completely under control."

On 8 March 1910, de Laroche became the first woman in the world to receive a pilot's licence when the Aero-Club of France issued her licence #36 of the Fédération Aéronautique Internationale (International Aeronautics Federation or F.A.I.).

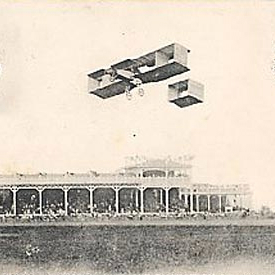
A postcard photo claiming to show de Laroche in flight in her Voisin biplane at the Grande Semaine d'Aviation de la Champagne Reims airshow in 1910, but actually showing an unknown Voisin biplane at the 1909 event, as obvious from the buildings

De Laroche participated in aviation meetings at Heliopolis in Egypt as well as Saint Petersburg, Budapest and Rouen. During the show in St. Petersburg, she was personally congratulated by Tsar Nicholas II. There, she was presented once again as "Baroness" de Laroche. Thereafter, the title became commonly used.

De Laroche's efforts were not trouble-free. La Petite Gironde reported on her activities on 5 January 1910. Calling her the first woman to fly, La Petite Gironde reported that during a flight around the field at Chalons, with clear skies and light wind, her plane had flown 4 or 5 meters above ground but suddenly crashed. Unconscious at first, de Laroche awoke complaining about internal pains, the result of a shoulder injury. In July 1910, de Laroche was participating in the week-long airshow at Reims in France. On 8 July, her aeroplane crashed, and she suffered such severe injuries that her recovery was in doubt, but two years later, she was fit again and had returned to flying. On 26 September 1912, she and Charles Voisin were involved in an automobile crash. Voisin was killed, and she was severely injured.

On 25 November 1913, de Laroche won the Aero-Club of France's Femina Cup for a non-stop long-distance flight of over four hours duration.

During World War I, as flying was considered too dangerous for women, she served as a military driver, chauffeuring officers from the rear zones to the front under fire.

In June 1919, de Laroche set two women's altitude records, one at 15,700 feet (4,800 m); and also the women's distance record, at 201 miles (323 km).

== Death and legacy ==
On 18 July 1919, de Laroche, who was a talented engineer, went to the airfield at Le Crotoy as part of her plan to become the first female test pilot. She co-piloted an experimental aircraft (whether she flew this is not known); on its landing approach the aeroplane went into a dive and crashed, killing both de Laroche and the co-pilot.

There is a statue of de Laroche at Paris–Le Bourget Airport in France.

From 6 to 12 March 2010, to celebrate the Centennial of Licensed Women Pilots, women pilots from eight countries on three continents used 20 types of aircraft to establish a new world record: 310 girls and women introduced to piloting by women pilots in one week.

Women of Aviation Worldwide Week is held annually during the week that includes 8 March, which marks the anniversary of Raymonde de Laroche's pilot licence.
