= Coolabah, New South Wales =

Coolabah
- Town
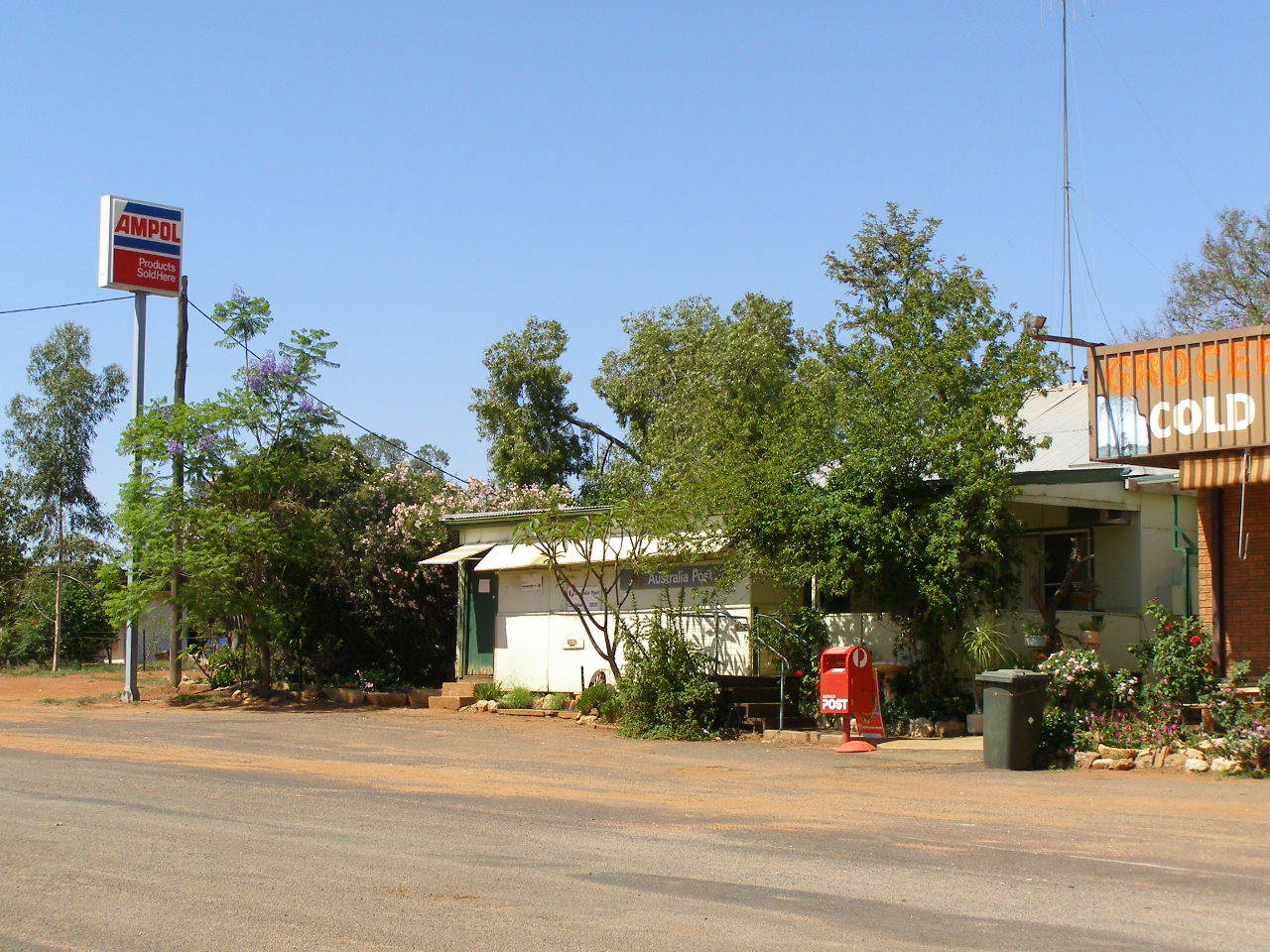
- Post office and petrol station, 2007

- Coordinates: 31°02′S 146°43′E
- Country: Australia
- State: New South Wales
- Region: Orana
- LGAs: Bogan Shire; Brewarrina Shire
- Location: 77 km (48 mi) NW of Nyngan; 630 km (390 mi) NW of Sydney

Government
  - State electorate: Barwon
  - Federal division: Parkes

Population
  - Total: 69 (2016 census)
- Postcode: 2831
- County: Canbelego
- Parish: Vega

Coolabah is a small village in central New South Wales, Australia, 76 km north of Nyngan and 656 km north-west of Sydney. It lies on either side of the Mitchell Highway between Nyngan and Bourke, with the area to the east of the highway in Brewarrina Shire and the westerly area in Bogan Shire.

== History ==
It took its name from "Coolabah", a nearby station.

The railway from Sydney to Bourke, the prime reason for the village’s existence, opened in 1884 and closed on 17 May 1989.

== Gallery ==
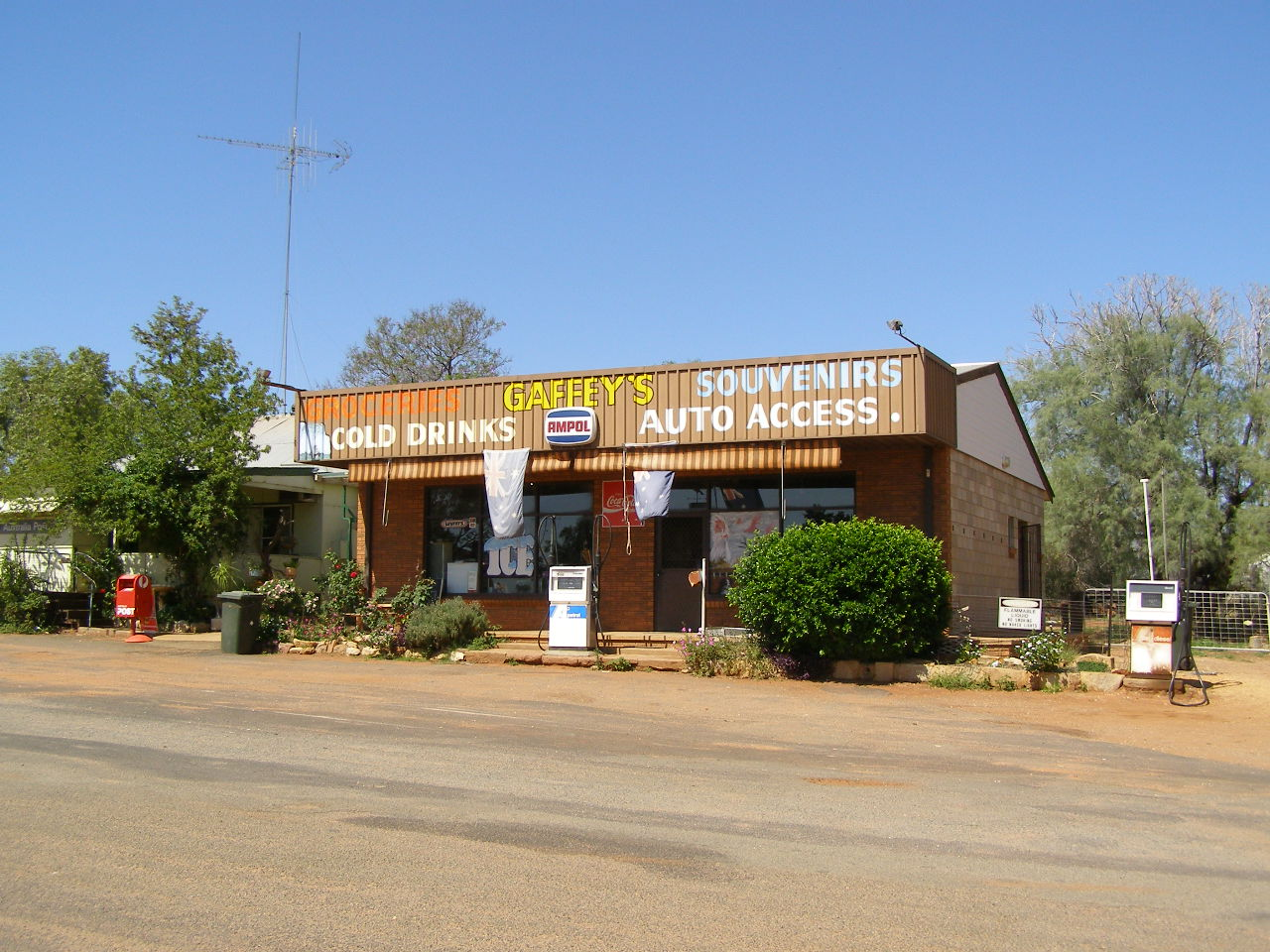
Petrol station, 2007

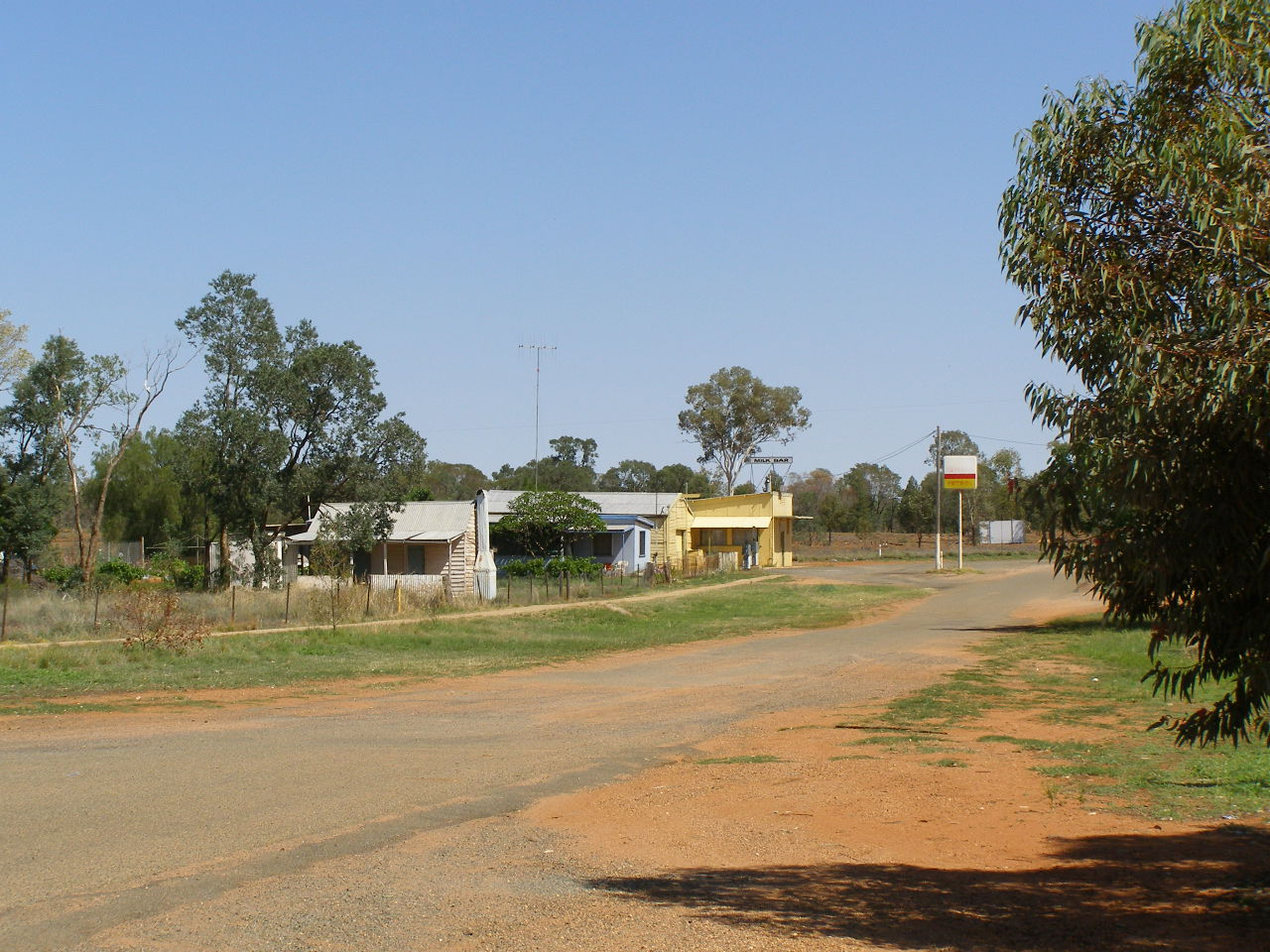
Streetscape of Mitchell Highway Service Road, 2007

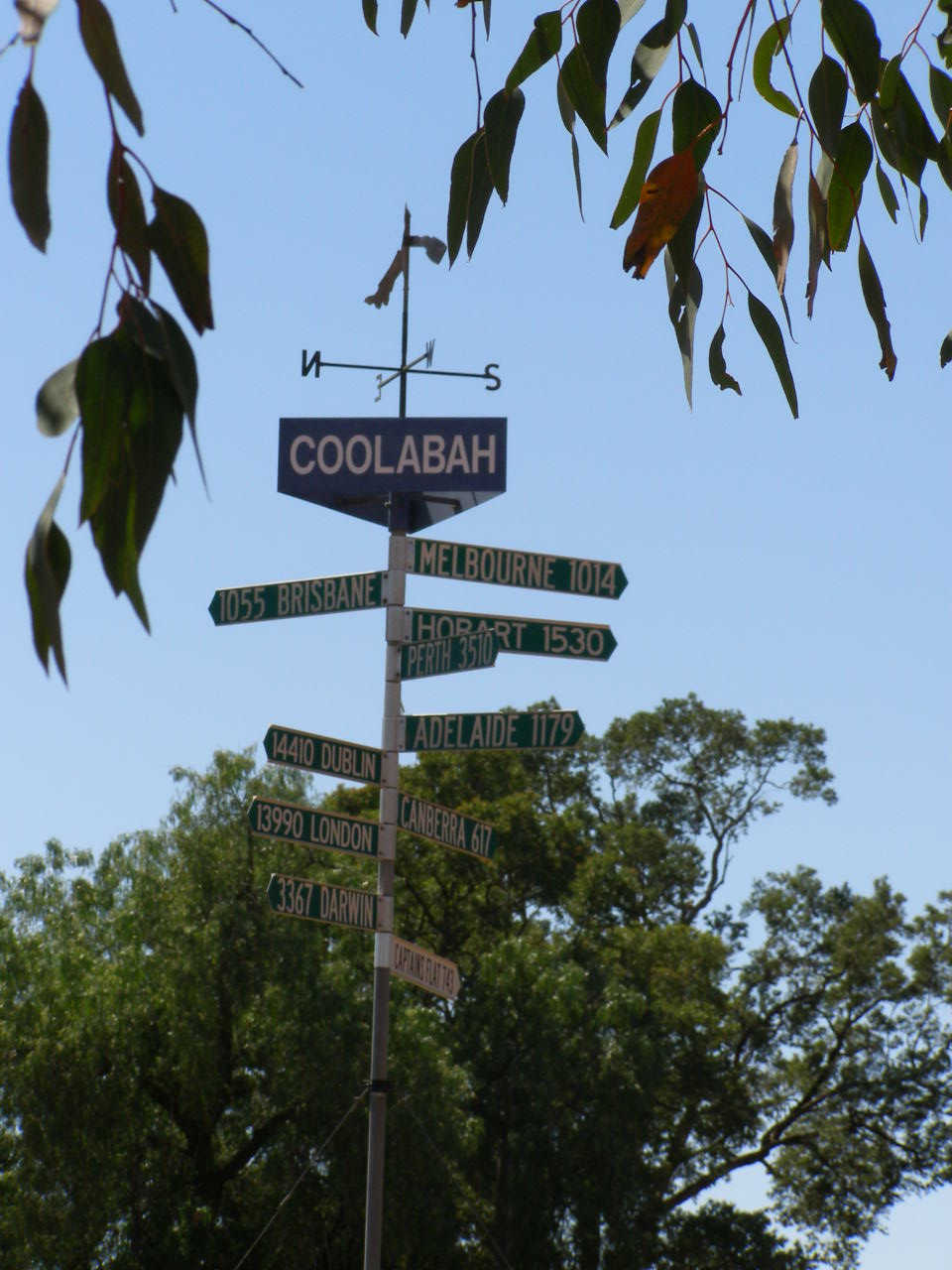
Distances from Coolabah, 2007

Preceding station	Former services	Following station
Byrock towards Bourke	Main Western Line	Girilambone towards Sydney
