= Far West Express =

Former passenger railway service in New South Wales, Australia

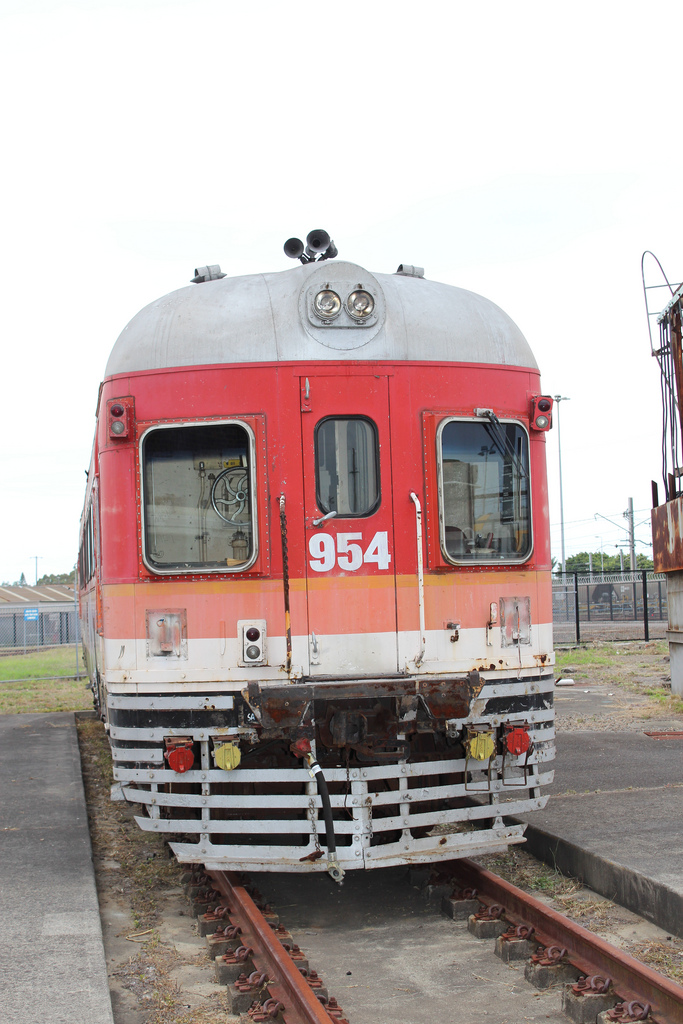
- DEB set carriage at Broadmeadow Locomotive Depot in December 2012

Overview
- Service type: Passenger train
- Status: Ceased
- First service: December 1957
- Last service: September 1975
- Former operator: Public Transport Commission

Route
- Termini: Dubbo; Bourke; Cobar; Coonamble
- Line used: Main Western

Technical
- Rolling stock: DEB set railcars

The Far West Express was an Australian passenger train operated by the New South Wales Government Railways from December 1957 until September 1975 from Dubbo to Bourke, Cobar and Coonamble.

It connected at Dubbo in the morning with the overnight Western Mail from Sydney, returning in the afternoon to connect with the return Mail in the evening. The train was formed of an air-conditioned DEB set with a van off the train from Sydney attached to the rear. It operated to Bourke thrice weekly, Cobar once weekly, and Coonamble twice-weekly.

It ceased in September 1975, when the Public Transport Commission introduced a fleet of six Denning road coaches to operate the services radiating from Dubbo.
