= Western Mail (train) =

Former railway service in Australia

Overview
- Service type: Passenger train
- Status: Ceased
- First service: 1973
- Last service: 27 November 1988
- Former operator: State Rail Authority

Route
- Termini: Sydney; Dubbo; Parkes
- Distance travelled: 462 kilometres (287 mi) (Dubbo); 446 kilometres (277 mi) (Parkes)
- Service frequency: Nightly in each direction
- Line used: Main Western

The Western Mail was an Australian passenger train that ran from Sydney to Dubbo and Parkes from 1973 until November 1988.

== Service history ==
The service commenced when the Dubbo Mail and Forbes Mail were combined.

The service ran overnight from Sydney via the Main Western line to Orange where the train divided with separate portions for Dubbo and Parkes. At Dubbo it connected with the Far West Express to Bourke, Cobar and Coonamble.

From 1957, the Sydney to Lithgow portion of the journey was hauled by 46 and later 86 class electric locomotives following the electrification of the Blue Mountains line.

Until November 1983, the Parkes service was extended to Forbes on certain nights. From June 1985, most Dubbo based State Rail Authority road coach services that connected with the Western Mail were retimed to meet with the Central West Express.

The Orange to Parkes portion was withdrawn in May 1986 with the remainder of the service ceasing in November 1988.
