= Marooma railway station =

Former railway station in New South Wales, Australia

Marooma

Services
Preceding station	Former services	Following station
Bourke Terminus	Main Western Line	Byrock towards Sydney

Marooma is a locality in far western New South Wales, Australia, approximately 20 km south-east of Bourke. A railway station on the Main West line was situated there between 1891 and 1957. The station was opened as Goondabooka, before being changed to Gundabooka in 1892 and finally to Marooma in 1900.
