= Western Mail =

Western Mail may refer to:

- Western Mail (Wales), a daily newspaper published in Cardiff, Wales
- Western Mail (Western Australia), newspaper in Perth, Western Australia, est. 1885, renamed The Countryman in 1955
- Western Mail (film), a 1942 American film directed by Robert Emmett Tansey
- Western Mail (train), a former train in New South Wales, Australia
