= Dubbo railway station =

Railway station in New South Wales, Australia

Dubbo
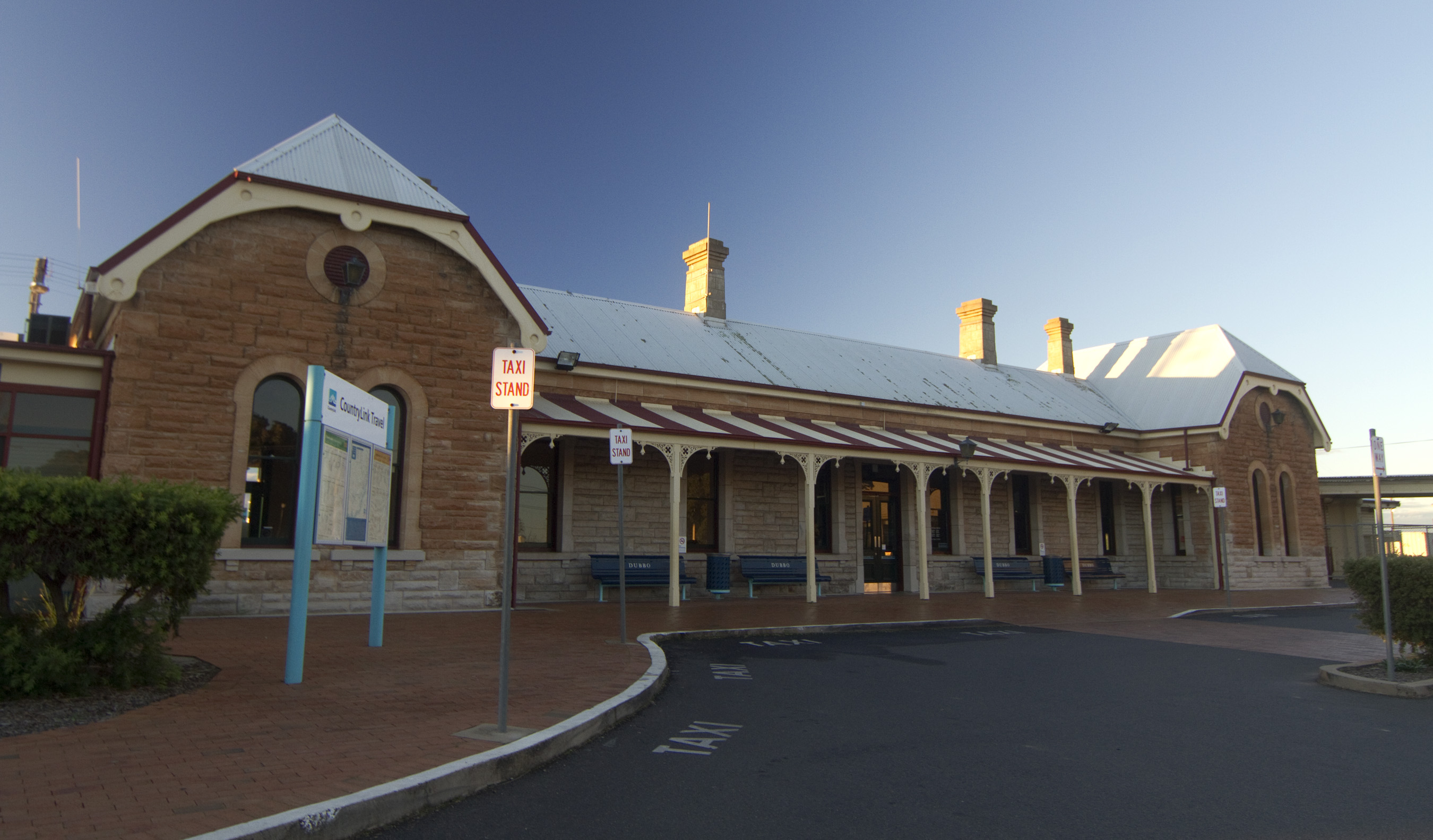

General information
- Location: Talbragar Street, Dubbo, New South Wales; Australia
- Coordinates: 32°14′41″S 148°36′34″E
- Owner: Transport Asset Manager of New South Wales
- Operator: NSW TrainLink
- Lines: Main Western (train and coach); Coonamble (coach); Molong–Dubbo (coach)
- Distance: 462.20 km (287.20 mi) from Central
- Platforms: 1
- Tracks: 2

Construction
- Structure type: Ground
- Accessible: Yes

Other information
- Station code: DBO

History
- Opened: 1 February 1881

Services
Preceding station	NSW TrainLink	Following station
Terminus	NSW TrainLink Western Line Dubbo XPT	Geurie towards Sydney

New South Wales Heritage Register
- Official name: Dubbo Railway Station and yard group
- Type: Railway Platform / Station
- Designated: 2 April 1999
- Reference no.: 1130
- Builder: Henry Albert Brigg
- Category: Transport – Rail
- Architect: John Whitton (attributed)
Location
- Location within New South Wales

Dubbo railway station is a heritage-listed railway station and bus interchange located on the Main Western line in Dubbo, New South Wales, Australia. The station serves the city of Dubbo and was opened on 1 February 1881. The station is also known as Dubbo Railway Station and yard group. The property was added to the New South Wales State Heritage Register on 2 April 1999. The station and associated yards were designed by the office of the Engineer-in-Chief of the NSW Government Railways, under the direction of John Whitton.

Dubbo was a major railway centre, being the junction for the Main Western, Molong–Dubbo and Coonamble lines and maintaining a sizeable locomotive depot. The Troy Junction–Merrygoen railway line also branches off close to the station. Dubbo was the limit for heavier 36, 38 and 60 class locomotives, with smaller locomotives taking over for journeys further west. The station previously had a bay platform, which was removed in August 1988. Rail services east from Sydney Central terminate at Dubbo and there are now services by coaches to the north west.

== Services ==
Dubbo was served by the Western Mail from Sydney Central until services ceased in November 1988. At Dubbo, it connected with the Far West Express to Bourke, Cobar and Coonamble.

In September 1975, the Public Transport Commission introduced six Denning coaches to replace all train services north and west from Dubbo.

Today, Dubbo is served by NSW TrainLink's daily Central West XPT service operating to and from Sydney Central. NSW TrainLink also operate road coach services from Dubbo to Lithgow, Cootamundra, Broken Hill, Bourke, Nyngan and Lightning Ridge.

Platform	Line	Stopping pattern	Notes
1	Western Region	services to Central	

== History ==
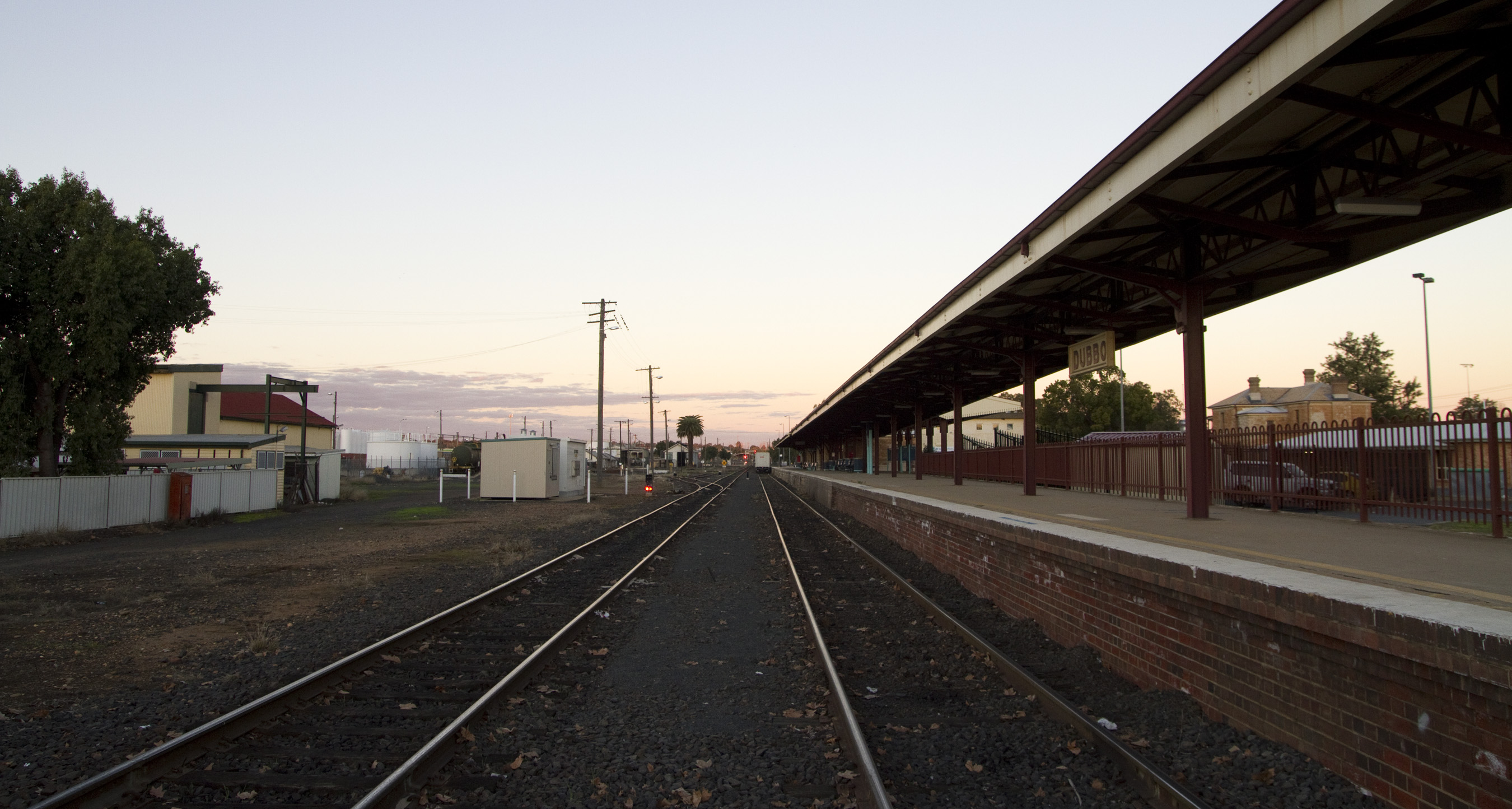
Eastbound view of the platform

Most of the stone structures comprising Dubbo Railway Station were built between 1879 and 1881 in preparation for its opening in 1881. The station master's residence was completed that same year. In the late 19th and early 20th centuries, some additions were made to the precinct, including:

- 1891 – construction of the lamp room and wool stage;
- 1893 – Dubbo West rail siding;
- 1897 – carriage shed;
- 1898 – the western end platform extension;
- 1893 – opening of the Dubbo–Coonamble rail line;
- 1904 – installation of a 20-tonne (22-short-ton) cart weighbridge and extensions to the Sydney end of the platform;
- 1908 – grain shed.

Numerous additions and alterations were made in the first two decades of the early 20th century, decreasing in frequency into the 1930s and 1940s.

By 1975, passenger services to Bourke, Cobar and Coonamble were replaced by a road coach services connecting with the trains at Dubbo Railway Station.

The 1980s saw demolition of several by-then anachronistic structural elements including the municipal gas siding, the livestock loading facility, the Darling Street gate house and the Institute Hall (relocated elsewhere). The Dubbo–Molong line was decommissioned in 1988.

Dubbo Railway Station remains an operational station on the Western line, although the station master's residence is now in private ownership.

== Description ==
=== Buildings ===
The station building is a type 5 stone first class station building, erected in 1881, with platform awnings cantilevered via brackets on steel posts. The station contained a railway refreshment room accommodation, also completed in stone in 1881. There are two adjacent residences, the station master's house located at Talbragar Street, being a type 4 building, completed in 1881 in stone; and at 106 Darling Street, being a type 11 building in stone, originally used as a locomotive straight shed.

=== Structures ===
The railway station platform faces were completed in 1881 in stone; and the location pump house was completed in corrugated iron, attached to the bridge, and completed c. 1881.

=== Modifications and dates ===
- 1879–81 – most of the stone structures of the station built in preparation for its 1881 opening. Station master's residence built 1881.
- 1891 – lamp room and wool stage built.
- 1893 – Dubbo West siding added.
- 1896–1900 – removal shop front (and rear?) at No 73.
- 1897 – carriage shed added.
- 1898 – western end platform extension made.
- 1903 – Dubbo–Coonamble line opened.
- 1904 – installation of 20-tonne (22-short-ton) cart weighbridge and extensions to Sydney end of the platform.
- 1906 – addition of a transhipping shed.
- 1908 – grain shed added.

In the first two decades of the 20th century, numerous additions and alterations were made, decreasing in frequency into the 1930s and 1940s. By 1975, passenger services to Bourke, Cobar and Coonamble were replaced by a road coach service, connecting with trains at Dubbo. The 1980s saw demolition of several by-then anachronistic structural elements including the municipal gas siding, livestock loading facility, Darling Street gate house and Institute Hall (relocated). In 1988, the Dubbo-Molong line was decommissioned. In 2015, the Dubbo railway station was an operational rail station on the western line only, although the residence at 106 Darling Street is now in private ownership.

== Heritage listing ==
Dubbo station and residences is one of the few groups of buildings on the NSW system constructed in stone and one of the very few stone first class railway stations built. The surviving stone platform faces are rare and of high significance. The site is of high significance as it is situated adjacent to some excellent early industrial buildings used in relation to the railway and the railway hotel. The group is an important element in the townscape of Dubbo which is an historic centre which relies on tourism and its historic theme. The whole of the railway station group is of very high significance to the development and history of Dubbo and the railway system.

Dubbo railway station was listed on the New South Wales State Heritage Register on 2 April 1999 having satisfied the following criteria.

The place possesses uncommon, rare or endangered aspects of the cultural or natural history of New South Wales.

This item is assessed as historically rare. This item is assessed as scientifically rare. This item is assessed as archaeologically rare. This item is assessed as socially rare.

== See also ==
- List of railway stations in New South Wales
