= Wellington railway station, New South Wales =

Railway station in New South Wales, Australia

Wellington
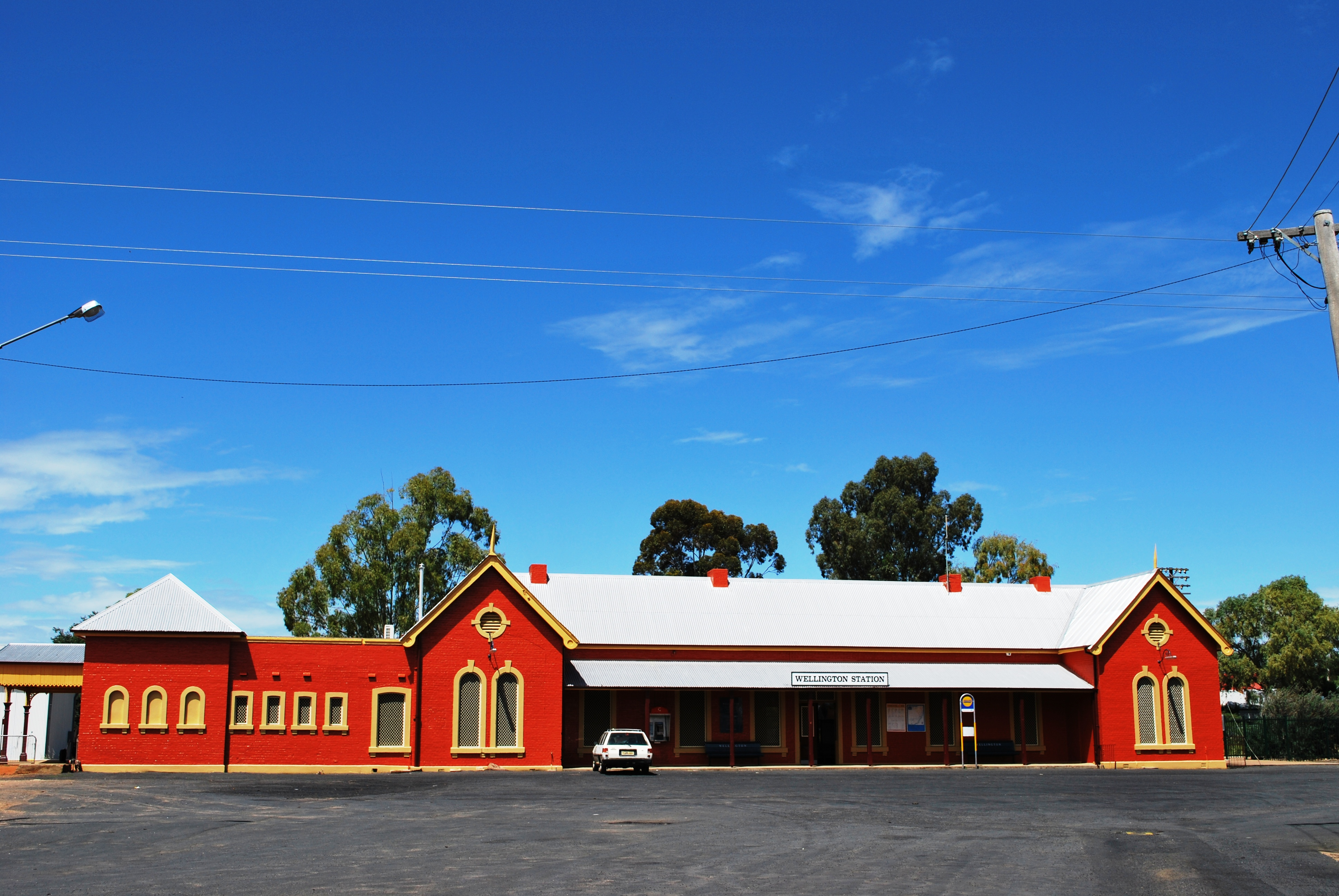
- Station front

General information
- Location: Swift Street, Wellington; Australia
- Coordinates: 32°33′14″S 148°56′48″E
- Owner: Transport Asset Manager of New South Wales
- Operator: NSW TrainLink
- Line: Main Western
- Distance: 410.40 kilometres (255.01 mi) from Central
- Platforms: 1
- Tracks: 2

Construction
- Structure type: Ground
- Parking: Yes
- Accessible: Yes

Other information
- Station code: WEL

History
- Opened: 1 June 1880

Services
Preceding station	NSW TrainLink	Following station
Geurie towards Dubbo	NSW TrainLink Western Line Dubbo XPT	Stuart Town towards Sydney
Location

Wellington railway station is located on the Main Western line in New South Wales, Australia. It serves the town of Wellington, opening on 1 June 1880 when the line was extended from Orange.

== Services ==
Wellington is served by NSW TrainLink's daily Central West XPT service operating between Sydney and Dubbo.

Platform	Line	Stopping pattern	Notes
1	Western Region	services to Sydney Central & Dubbo	

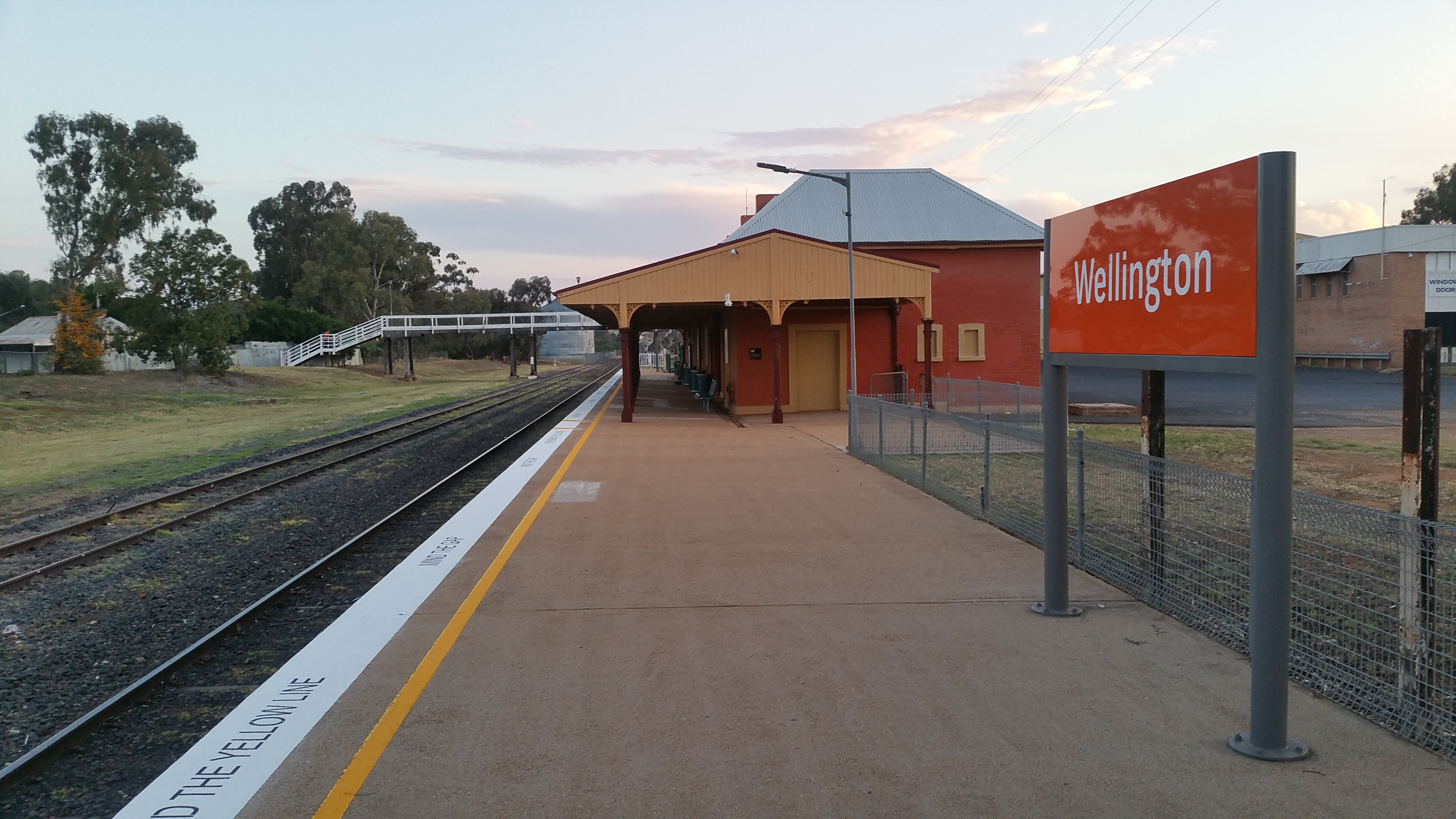
Station platform

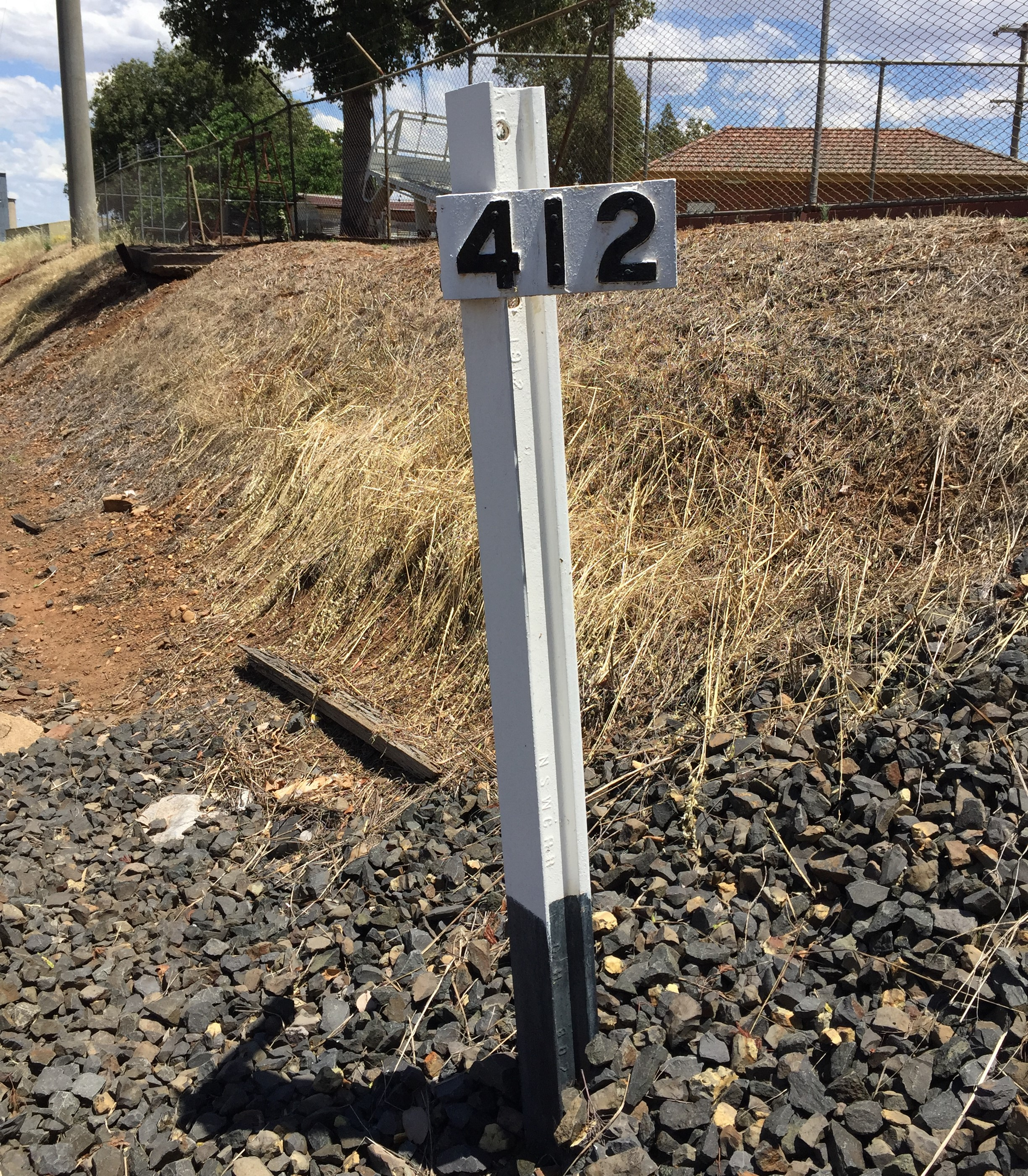
412-kilometre (256 mi) sign north of Wellington station
