= Bourke railway station =

Disused railway station in New South Wales, Australia

Bourke
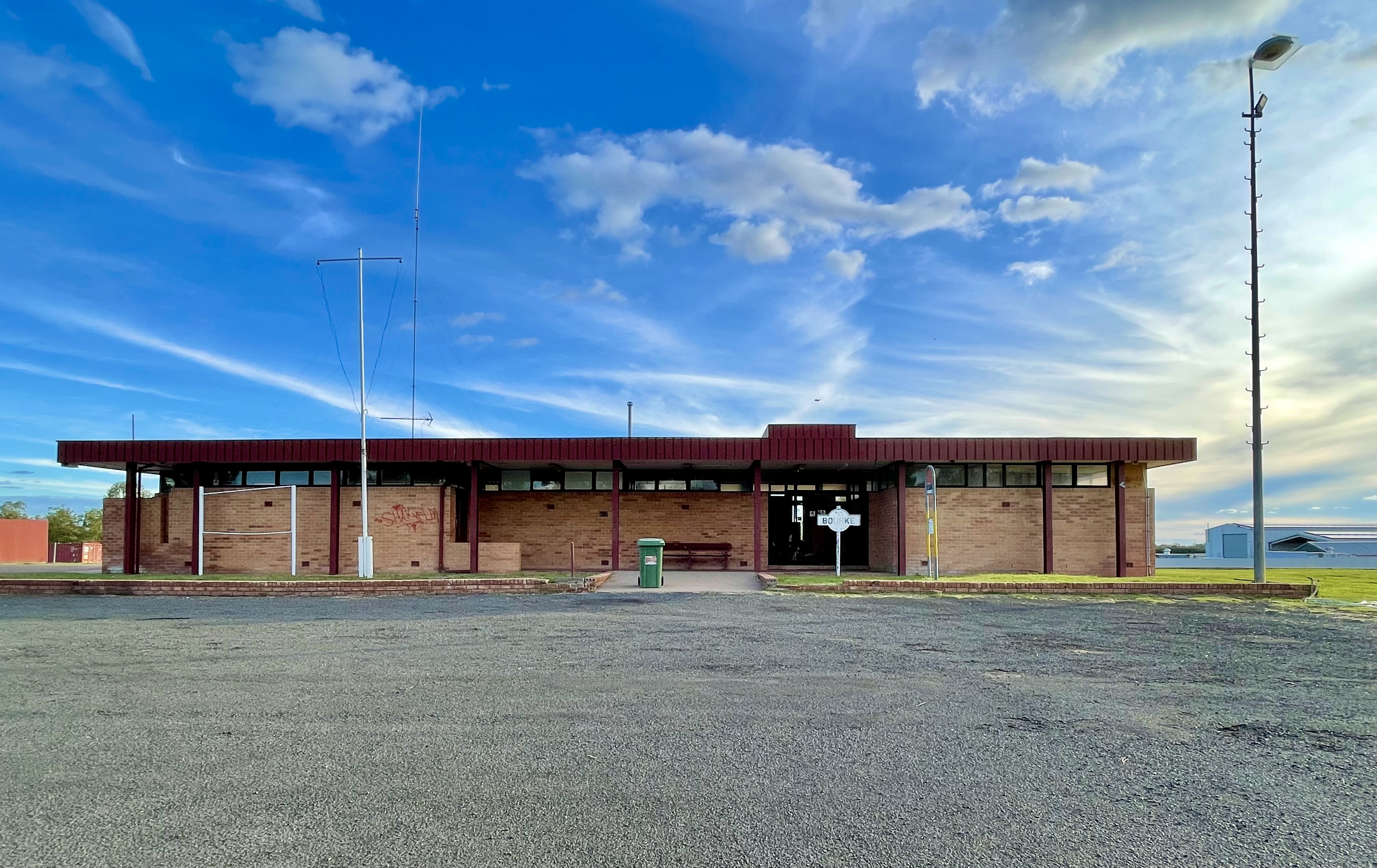

General information
- Location: Anson St, Bourke, New South Wales, Australia
- Coordinates: 30°05′41″S 145°56′07″E
- System: Closed railway station
- Owner: Transport Asset Manager of New South Wales
- Line: Main Western
- Distance: 824.83 kilometres (513 mi) from Central
- Platforms: 1
- Tracks: 2

Construction
- Structure type: Ground

Other information
- Status: Closed

History
- Opened: 3 August 1885
- Closed: 20 September 1975

Services
Preceding station	Former services	Following station
Terminus	Main Western Line	Marooma towards Sydney

New South Wales Heritage Database (Local Government Register)
- Official name: Bourke Railway Precinct
- Type: State heritage (built)
- Designated: n.d.
- Reference no.: s.170 NSW State agency heritage register
- Type: Railway Platform / Station
- Category: Transport – Rail
- Builders: NSW Government Railways
Route map
Location

Bourke railway station is a heritage-listed disused railway station in Bourke, in the Far West region of New South Wales.

The station opened in 1885 as the terminus of the Main Western line. Passenger trains to Bourke ceased in 1975 when the rail service beyond Dubbo was replaced by road coaches. NSW TrainLink continued to serve the station by coach into the 2020s. The property is part of the Country Regional Network.

== History ==
By 1877, there was significant political pressure to minimise the diversion of trade from western New South Wales to Victoria and South Australia via river trade along the Darling and Murray rivers. The town of Bourke had become the key centre for pastoralists in western New South Wales since its formation in 1861. Provision was thus made to extend the line to Dubbo, reaching Wellington in 1880 and Dubbo in 1881. At the time, Dubbo had grown into a town of strategic importance on the stock routes between northern New South Wales and the Victorian goldfields.

Beyond Dubbo, the railway opened up new land to European settlement, and was directly responsible for the development of townships. The line reached the future site of Narromine in 1883, and the railway station was the first building in the future settlement. The line reached the site of Nevertire in 1882, serving the nearby established village of Warren (a branch opened to Warren in 1898). Construction reached the site of Nyngan in 1883, with the nearby coach-stop village of Canonbar moving in its entirely to establish the town of Nyngan. Beyond Nyngan, the line swept across the plains in a straight line for 116 miles (187 km), then the longest stretch of straight railway line in the world. It reached the temporary terminus of Byrock in 1884 before reaching its final destination of Bourke in 1885. The now-gone Station Master's residence was completed in the same year.

A loading bank was built in 1890. A small coal stage, depot and drivers' barracks were added in 1891. In 1965, the station building was destroyed by a fire. It was replaced in 1968, becoming the first station building in New South Wales to be air-conditioned.

The last goods train to Bourke ran in 1989.

== Services ==
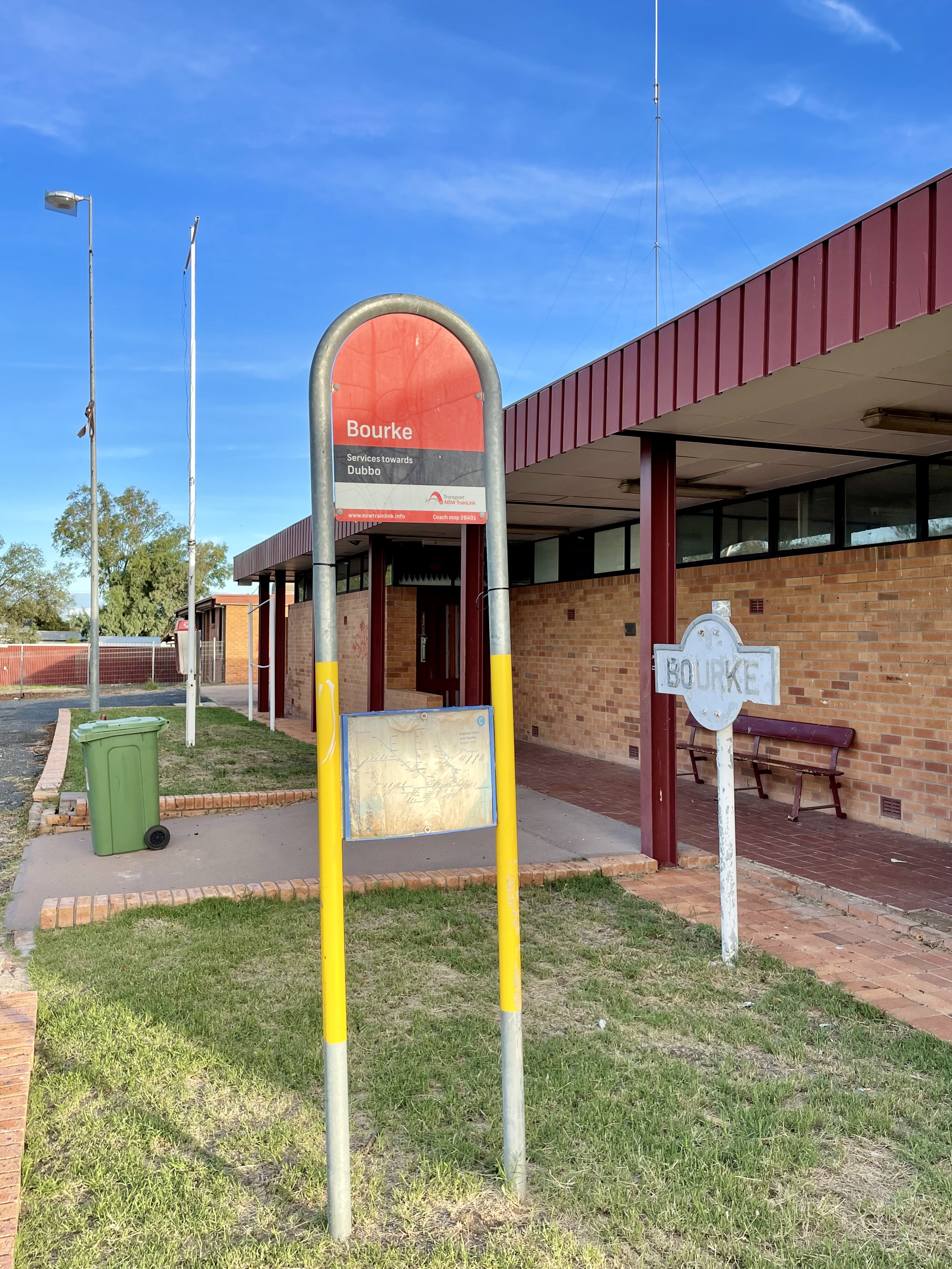
Coach terminal at the station

Bourke was served by the Far West Express, which connected with the Western Mail from Sydney Central at Dubbo. The Far West Express was withdrawn by the Public Transport Commission on 20 September 1975 and was substituted by coaches.

A NSW TrainLink coach service continues to run from Bourke to Dubbo, though the service no longer terminates at the station. From Dubbo, the Central West Express operates to Central.

In 2018, NSW TrainLink began trialling a day-return coach service from Bourke to Dubbo. The service, running on Wednesday and Thursday, travelled to Dubbo in the morning and returned in the evening.

== Heritage listing ==
The 1968 station building at Bourke is notable as the first railway station building in NSW to be air conditioned. The site is also significant as one of the more remote railway precincts in NSW.

The Bourke Railway Precinct was listed on the NSW State agency heritage register via s.170 of the Heritage Act, having satisfied the following criteria.

The place is important in demonstrating aesthetic characteristics and/or a high degree of creative or technical achievement in NSW.

The station building has some technical significance as the first railway station to be air conditioned in NSW.

== Gallery ==
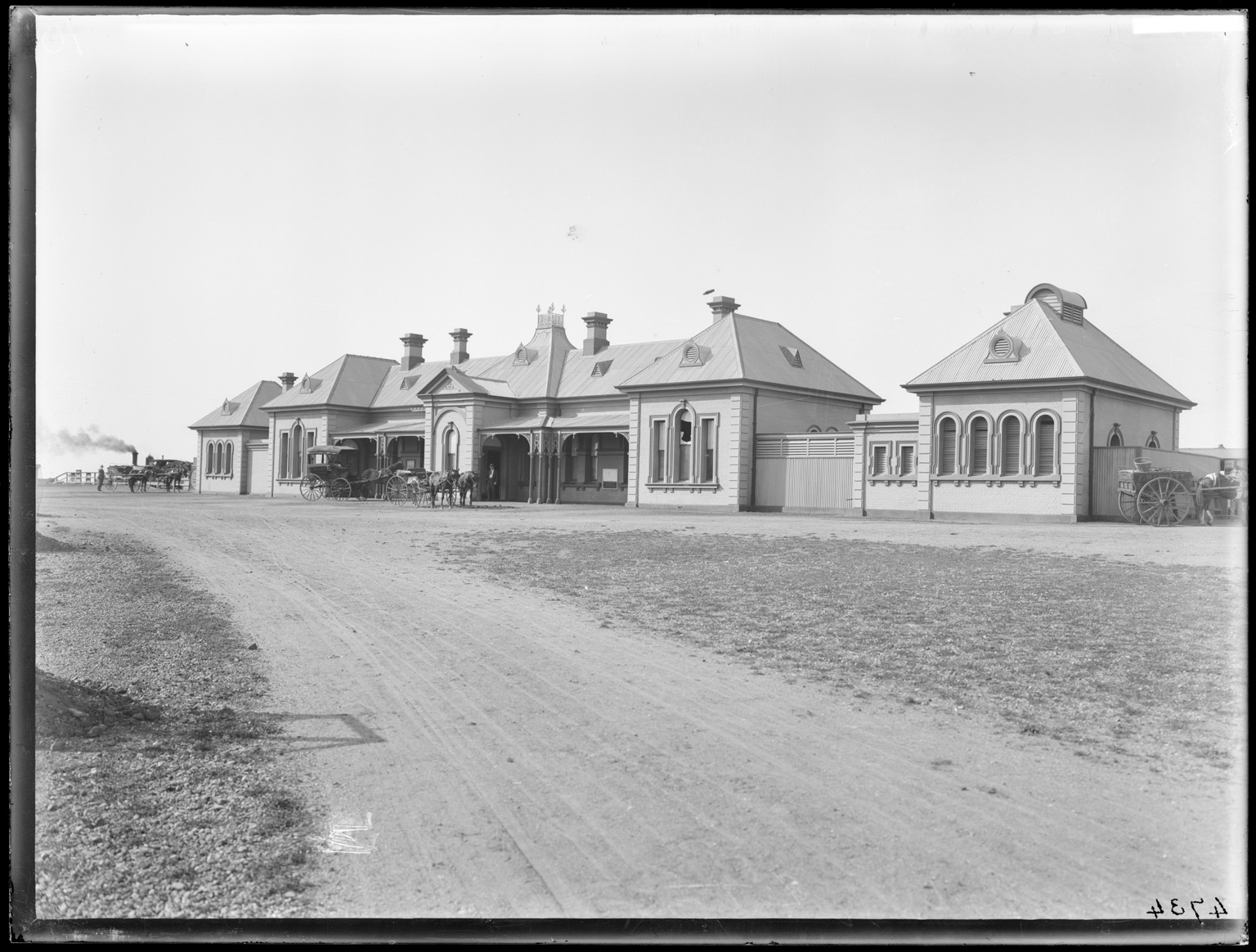

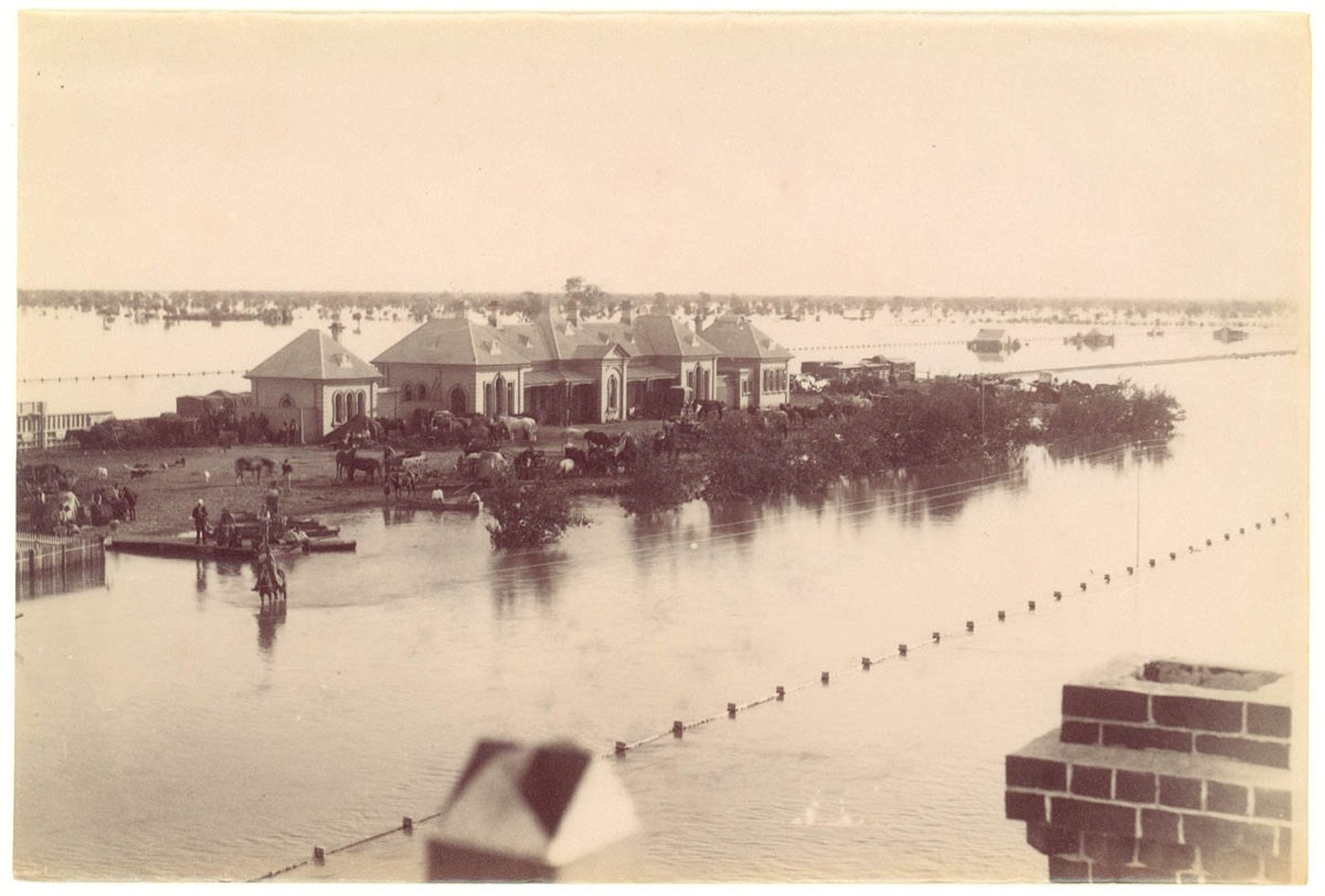
The station during a flood in 1890

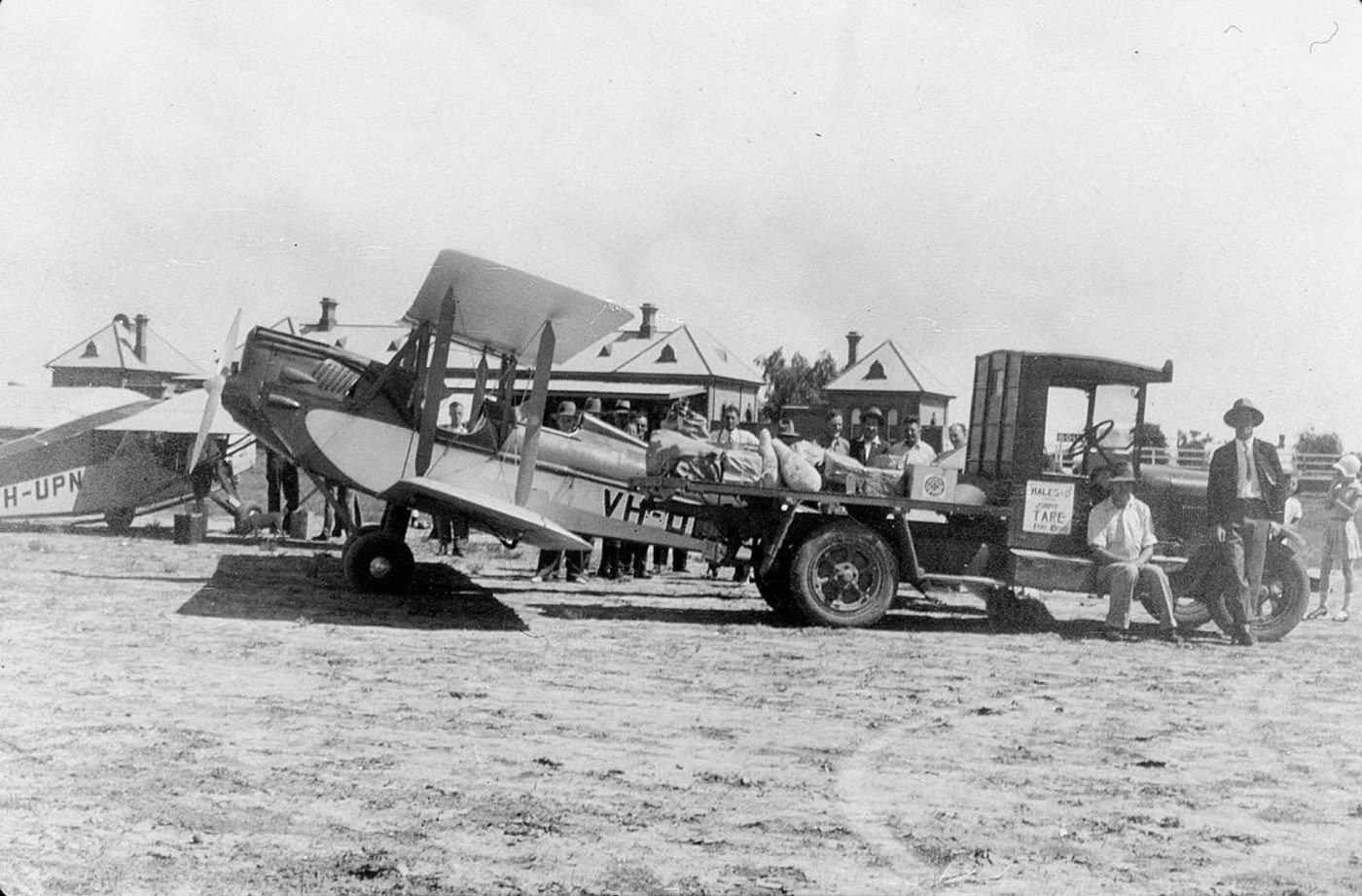
Aeroplanes being loaded with Christmas supplies for flood-bound "Tinnenburra" station in Queensland, c. 1930

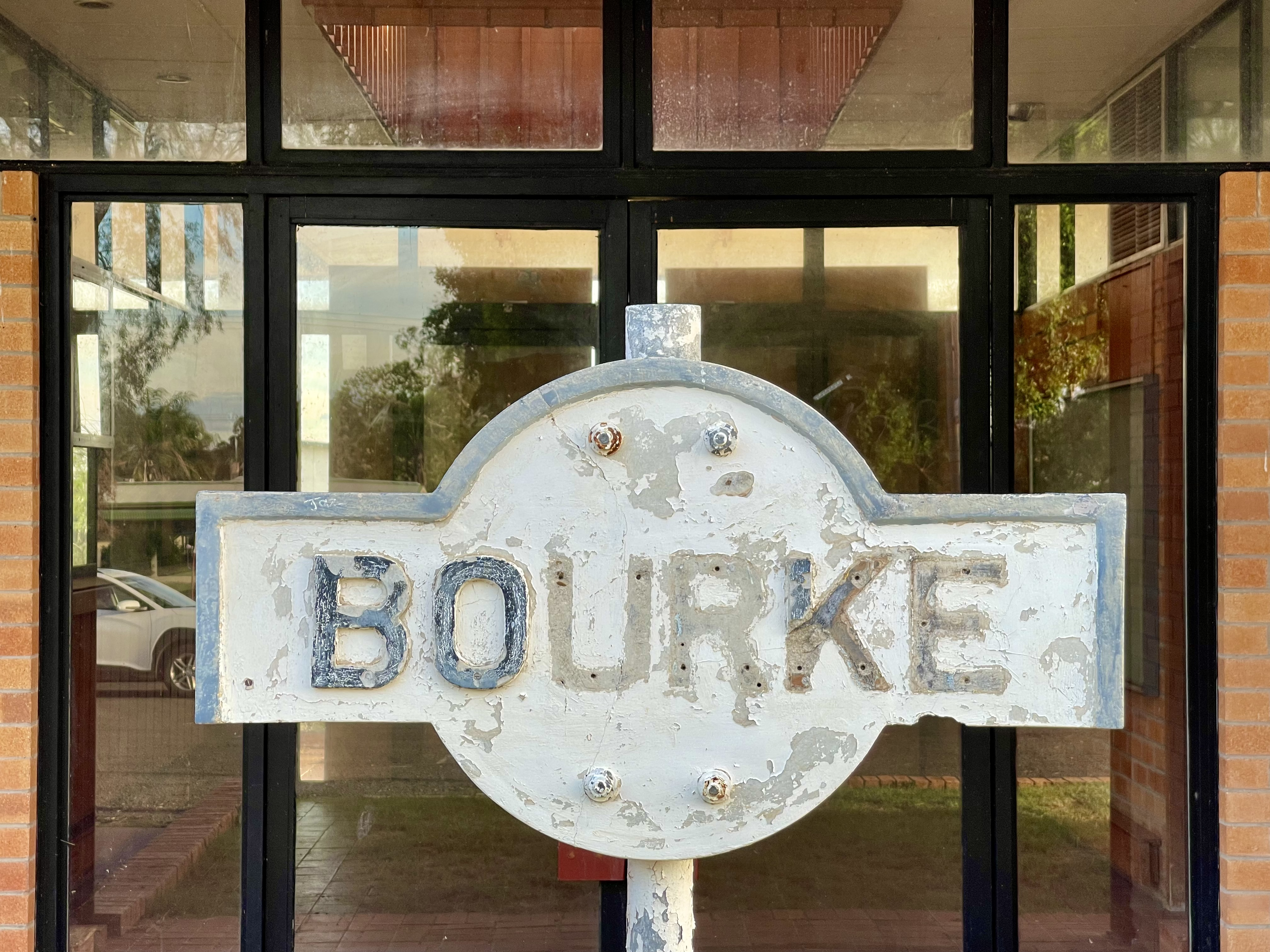

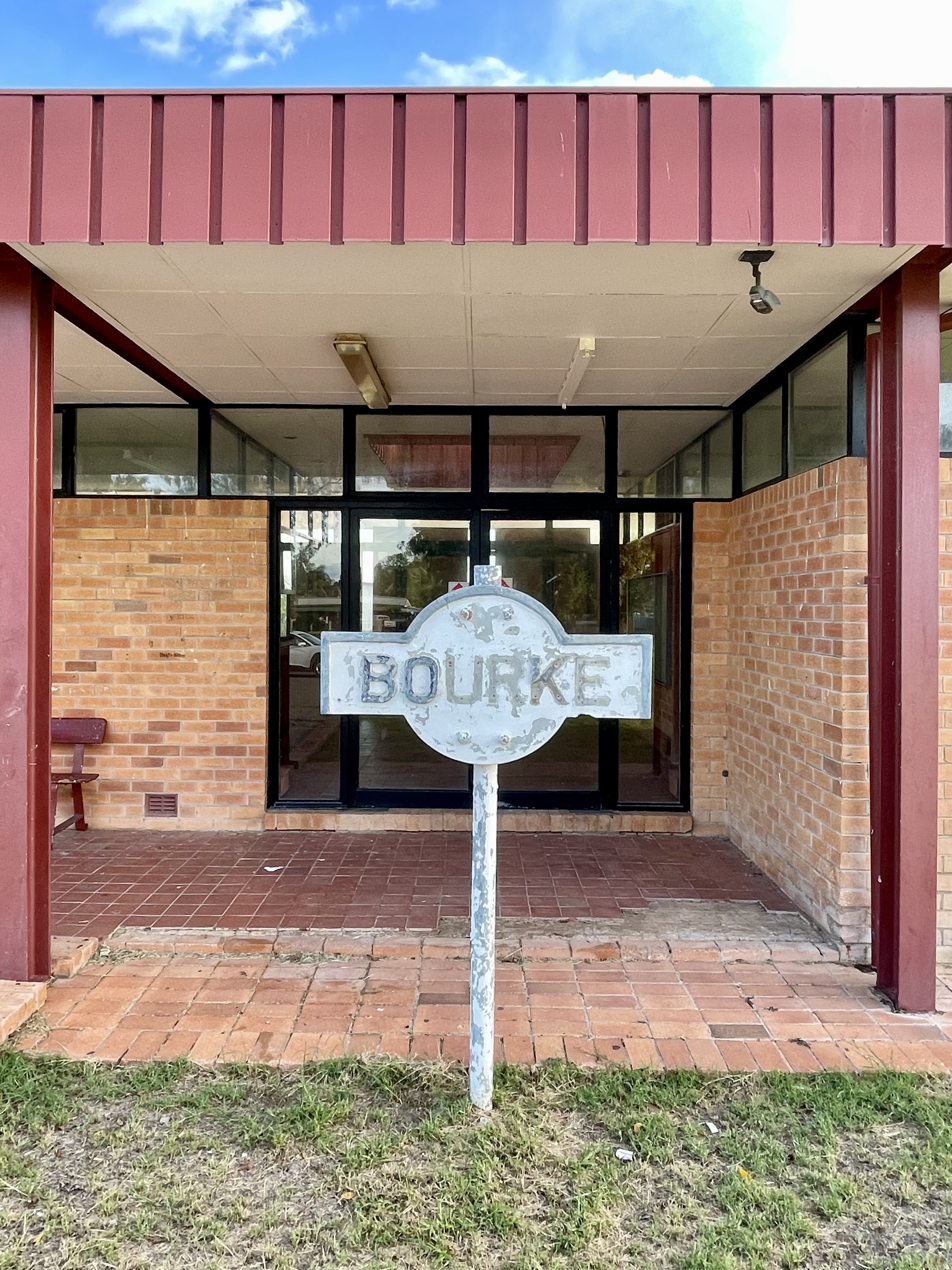
