= Byrock, New South Wales =

Byrock
- Town
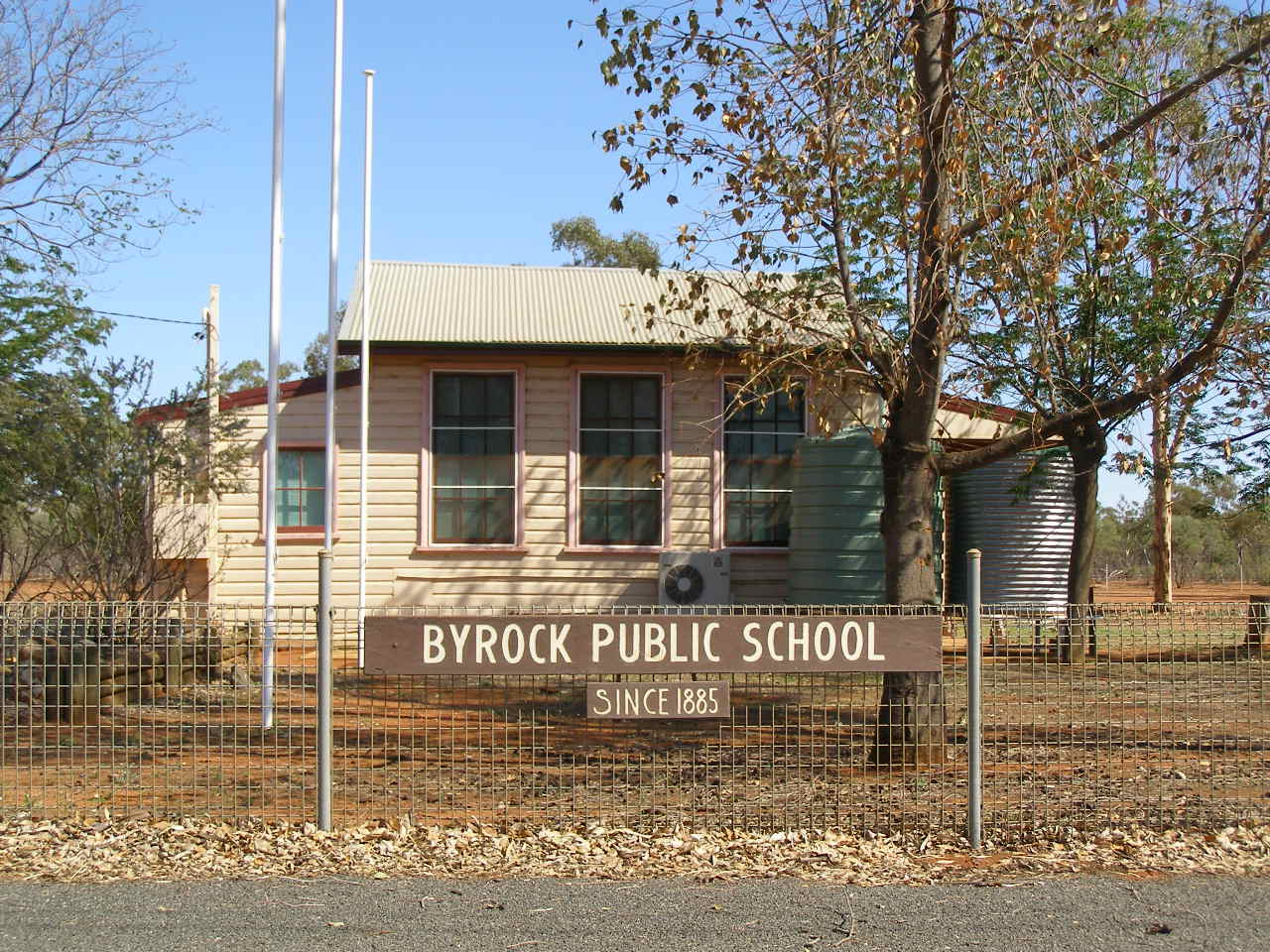
- The School

- Coordinates: 30°39′43″S 146°24′13″E
- Country: Australia
- State: New South Wales
- LGA: Bourke Shire
- Location: 575 km (357 mi) NW of Sydney; 107 km (66 mi) NNE of Cobar; 89 km (55 mi) SW of Brewarrina

Government
  - State electorate: Barwon
  - Federal division: Parkes
- Elevation: 155 m (509 ft)

Population
  - Total: 50 (2016 census)
- Postcode: 2831
- Mean max temp: 26 °C (79 °F)
- Mean min temp: 13 °C (55 °F)
- Annual rainfall: 404 mm (15.9 in)

Byrock is a small village in north western New South Wales, Australia in Bourke Shire. In 2016, Byrock had a population of 50 people.

It is named after a rock hole, called Bai by the Nyammba tribe. This became the Bye Rockhole, then Bye Rock, then Byrock.

Byrock is on the Mitchell Highway roughly halfway between Bourke to the north-west and Nyngan to the south-east.

== Railways ==
Byrock was founded to serve the Cobb and Co stagecoaches. The railway reached Byrock from Nyngan in 1874, with an extension to Bourke opening on 3 September 1885. On 6 July 1900, Byrock became a railway junction when the new branch line Byrock to Brewarrina opened. The branch line to Brewarrina closed in 1974 after the line was damaged by flooding, the mainline from Nyngan to Bourke through Byrock was closed in May 1989, after flooding caused major track damage. Passenger train services ceased in 1975.

== Services ==
The Mulga Creek Hotel with a caravan and camping ground.

== Water ==
Byrock relies on rainfall for its non potable water supply that is channeled into a large ground tank, settled and then pumped to the historical railway tank. Water is then gravity fed to dwellings. When the ground tank runs dry, emergency water cartage from Bourke is provided by road tanker, as was the case around 2006.

Byrock has one Council maintained bore.

== Cemetery ==
The Byrock Cemetery is the resting place for pioneers who died between 1882 and 1933. The average age at death of those buried in this cemetery is 20 years.

== Public transport ==
NSW TrainLink operate a bus service between Dubbo and Bourke, via Nyngan, four days a week.

== Airstrip ==
Byrock has a gravel airstrip 1067 metres long with no facilities. It is located next to the town on the western side of the Mitchell Highway.

== Newspaper ==
The Western Herald community newspaper is delivered free to Byrock from Bourke every Thursday.

== School ==
In 2006, the school was placed on review because of insufficient enrolments and has since been formally closed. By September 2009, the site of the former Byrock Public School was put up for sale by the NSW Department of Education.

== Gallery ==
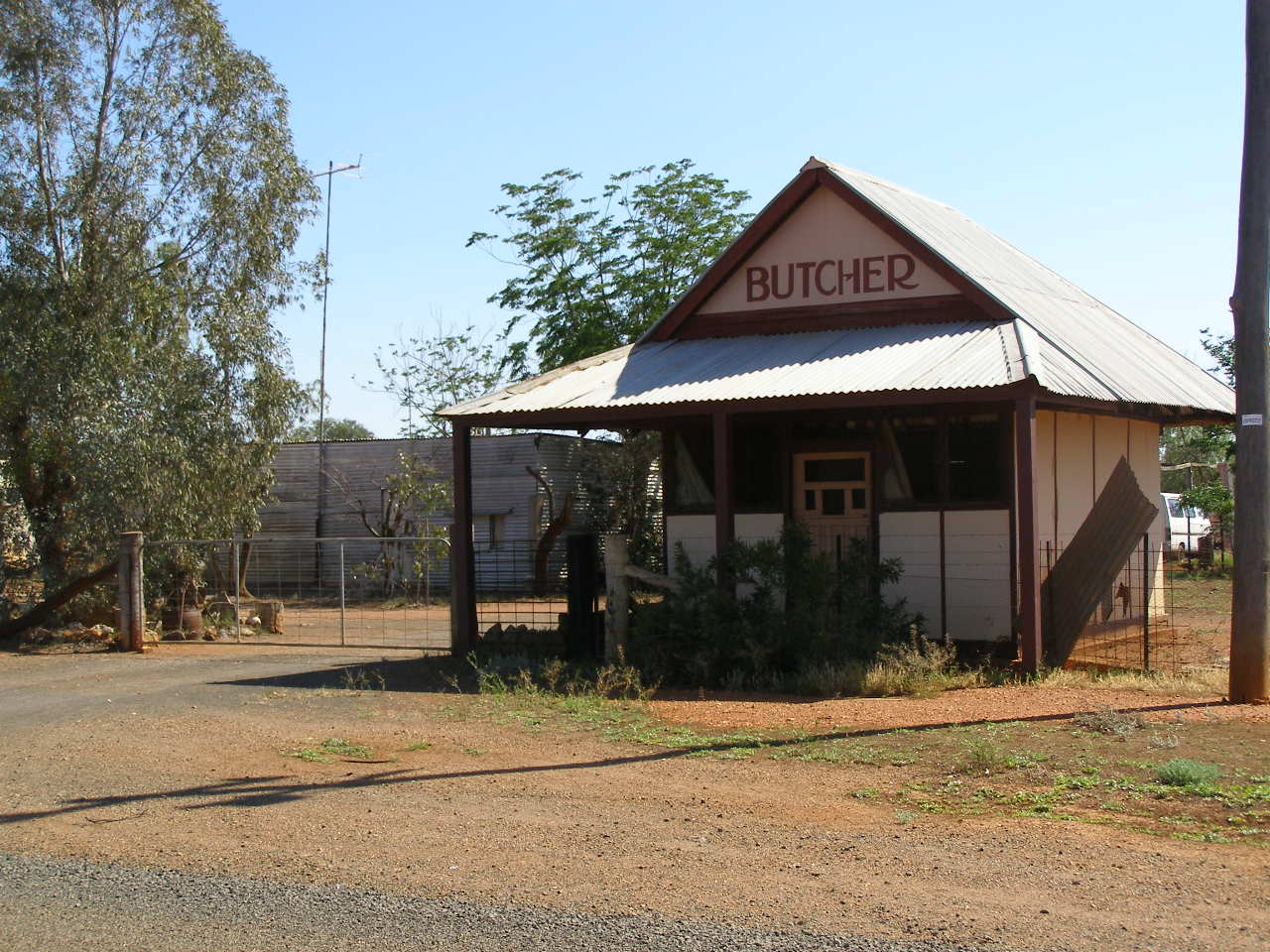
Butcher shop, Byrock

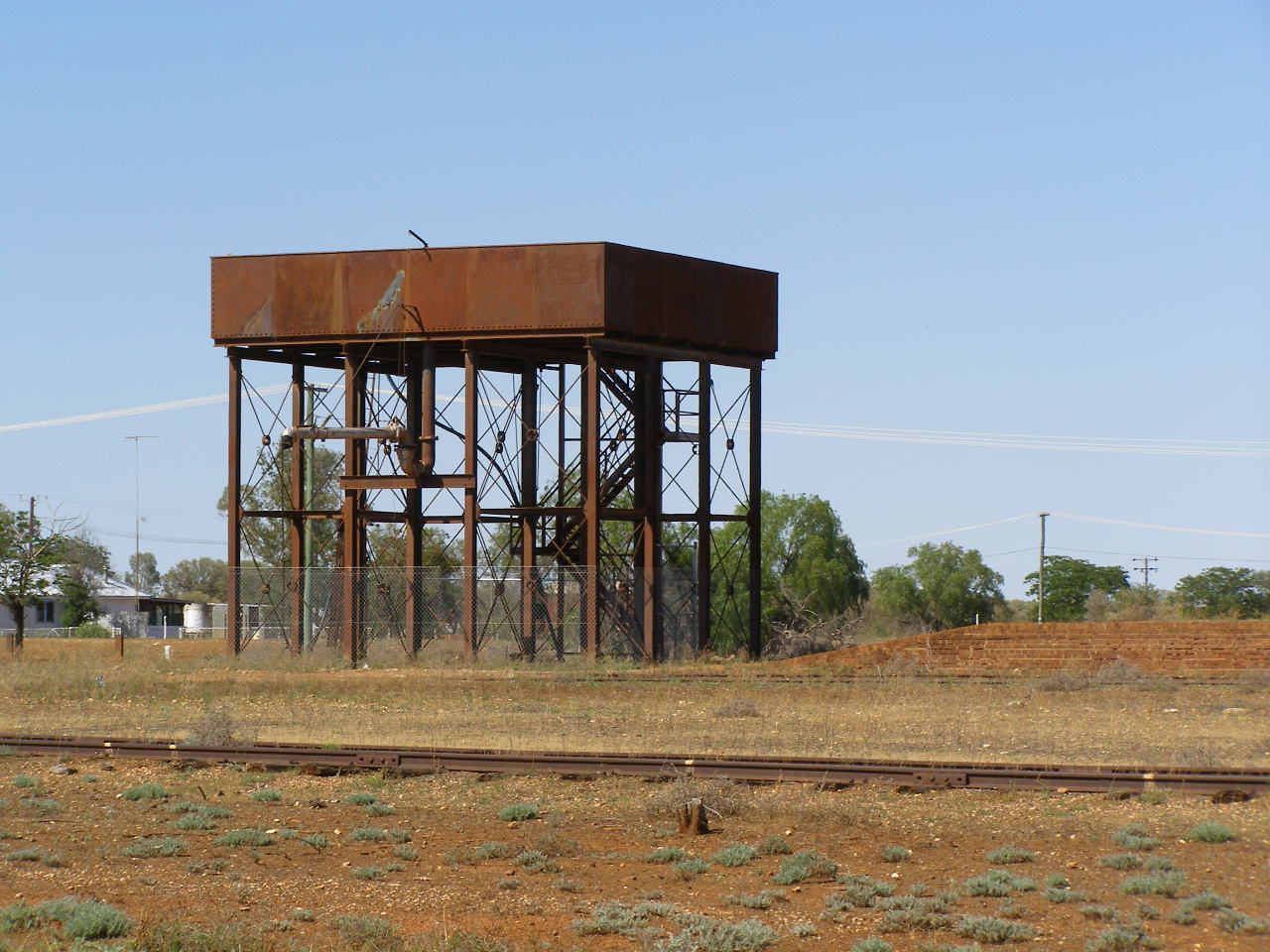
Water tower, Byrock

Preceding station	Former services	Following station
Marooma towards Bourke	Main Western Line	Coolabah towards Sydney
Wyuna Downs towards Brewarrina	Brewarrina Line	Terminus
