= Brewarrina railway line =

Former railway line, New South Wales

The Brewarrina railway line is a closed branch railway line in far-western New South Wales, Australia. It joined the Main West Line at Byrock with the town of Brewarrina on the Darling River. It was 93.67 km long.

== Construction ==
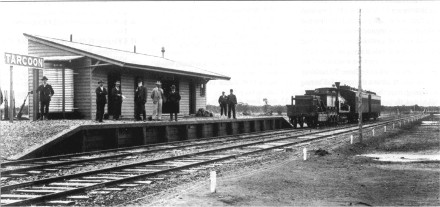
A typical inspection train stands at Tarcoon on 21 August 1901, prior to the opening of the line to Brewarrina

The residents of Brewarrina realised the benefit of a railway connection and presented a petition to the Minister for Public Works in September, 1881, for a railway to be connected to their town from Byrock. At that date, the Western Line had only reached Dubbo and its extension to Nyngan was under construction.

The Parliamentary Standing Committee on Public Works recommended on 22 June 1898 that the proposed Byrock to Brewarrina branch line should be built, subject to a levee being paid by Crown Lands Lessees in the area served by the proposed line.

The line opened as far as Tarrion Creek in July, 1900 and was completed to Brewarrina on 2 September 1901.

A peculiar feature of this line was the method of construction of the associated signal and telegraph lines. To minimise cost, the wiring was fixed to short pegs nailed to the side of the sleepers rather than the standard method of installation of overhead wiring on telegraph poles.

== Operations ==
The line replaced the river trade on the Barwon and Darling rivers, and carried large quantities of wool.

For the greater part of its life, the predominant train service was a Mixed train connecting with the Through Mail at Byrock on Tuesdays, Thursdays and Saturdays and returning to Byrock on Mondays, Wednesdays and Fridays. Conditional stock trains ran as required.

In the 1960s, the Through Mail was replaced by a self-propelled diesel train and the Brewarrina Mixed train operated only twice each week.

== Demise ==
It was closed after damage by flooding on 18 January 1974 and not re-opened. The last passenger service operated on 12 January 1974. The line was officially decommissioned as at 11 August 1982.

== See also ==
- Rail transport in New South Wales
