= Coonamble railway line =

Railway line in New South Wales, Australia

Coonamble Line
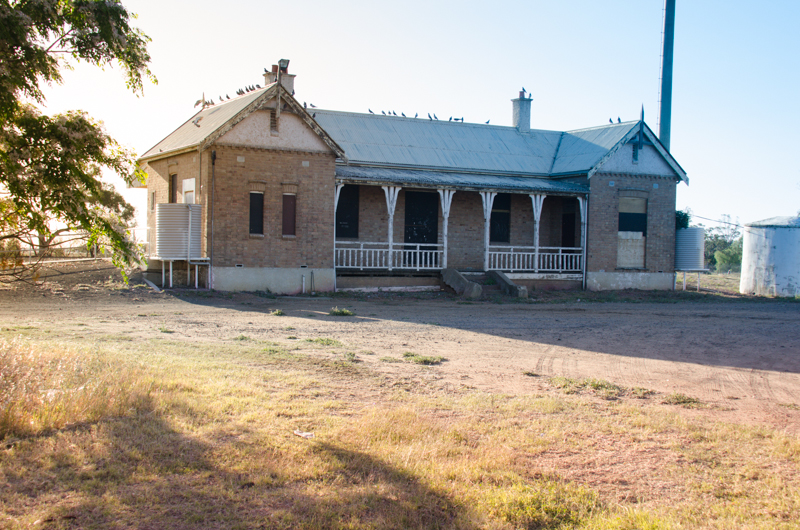
- Coonamble railway station

Technical
- Track gauge: 1,435 mm (4 ft 8 1/2 in)
- Signalling: Train Order Working
- Train protection system: TMACS

The Coonamble railway line is a railway line in New South Wales, Australia, branching from the Main West Line at Dubbo.

It opened in 1903, and carried passenger traffic until the 1970s. 900/950 class railmotors were first introduced on the service between Dubbo and Coonamble. It continues to carry goods traffic, predominantly grain. Operations over the line are managed by the Australian Rail Track Corporation (ARTC) under a 60-year agreement.

The northern section of the line featured track that was in generally poor condition with derailments not uncommon. However, a NSW Government project, completed in 2017, restored the line, including the laying new steel sleepers and renewing bridges.

== See also ==
- Rail transport in New South Wales
