= Coonamble =

- Town
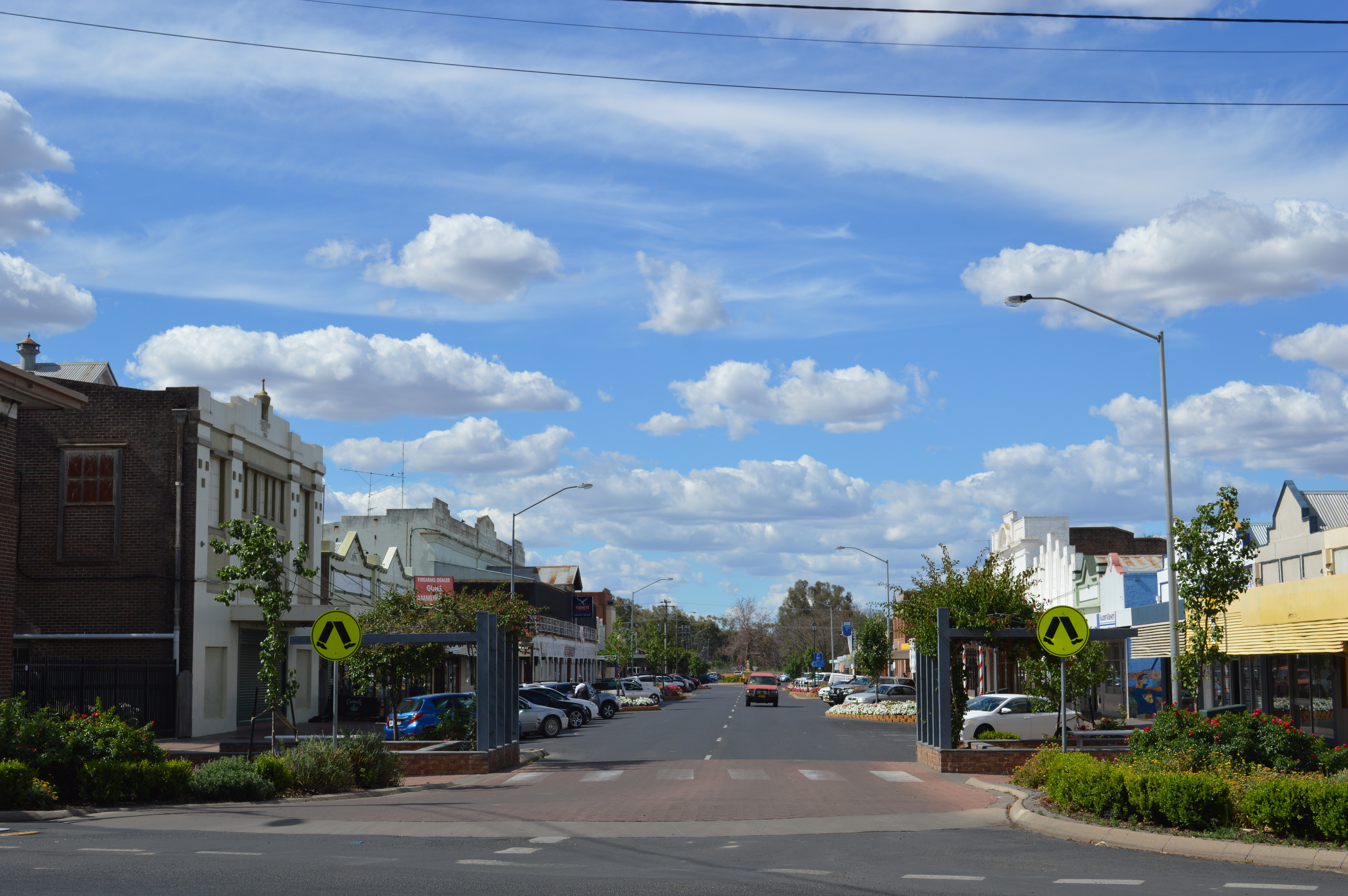
- Castlereagh St, the main street of Coonamble

- Coordinates: 30°57′0″S 148°24′0″E
- Country: Australia
- State: New South Wales
- Region: Orana
- LGA: Coonamble
- Location: 575 km (357 mi) NW of Sydney; 164 km (102 mi) N of Dubbo; 99 km (62 mi) N of Gilgandra; 117 km (73 mi) NW of Coonabarabran; 186 km (116 mi) SW of Narrabri

Government
  - State electorate: Barwon
  - Federal division: Parkes
- Elevation: 180 m (590 ft)

Population
  - Total: 2,750 (2016 census)
- Postcode: 2829
- County: Leichhardt
- Mean max temp: 26.6 °C (79.9 °F)
- Mean min temp: 11.6 °C (52.9 °F)
- Annual rainfall: 504.9 mm (19.88 in)

Coonamble is a town on the central-western plains of New South Wales, Australia. It lies on the Castlereagh Highway 95 km (59 mi) north-west of Gilgandra and 115 km (71 mi) south-east of Walgett. At the 2016 census, Coonamble had a population of 2,750. It is the regional hub for wheat growing and sheep and wool. The name for the town is taken from the Gamilaraay word guna (faeces) and -bil (having much).

Brigidine nuns from Ireland established a school in 1883. Their architecturally distinguished convent was dismantled in 1990 and transported 600 km (373 mi) to Pokolbin in 1991, where it now houses The Convent resort.

Although Coonamble had been a major sheep industry region in the 1980s to 2000, there has recently been an increasing interest in cattle rearing. The summers can have temperatures reaching up to 40 °C (104 °F) and in winter, there are nights as cold as 0 °C (32 °F). Most recently Coonamble has gained media coverage due to their mass floods over Christmas 2009.

== Population ==
Historical population
Year	Pop.	±%
1921	2,211	—
1933	2,717	+22.9%
1947	2,567	−5.5%
1954	2,910	+13.4%
1961	3,235	+11.2%
1966	3,410	+5.4%
1971	3,166	−7.2%
1976	3,054	−3.5%
1981	3,090	+1.2%
1986	3,058	−1.0%
1991	2,886	−5.6%
1996	2,754	−4.6%
2001	2,659	−3.4%
2006	2,549	−4.1%
2011	2,446	−4.0%
2016	2,409	−1.5%
2021	2,353	−2.3%
Source: Australian Bureau of Statistics data.

- In the 2016 Census, there were 2,750 people in Coonamble.
- Aboriginal and Torres Strait Islander people made up 34.2% of the population.
- 80.0% of people were born in Australia and 83.0% of people only spoke English at home.
- The most common responses for religion were Anglican 34.3% and Catholic 28.9%.

== Schools and churches ==
Coonamble has three schools: Coonamble Public School, St Brigids Catholic School, and Coonamble High School.

It has a Catholic and an Anglican church.

== Rodeo ==
Coonamble hosts an annual rodeo that is attended by around 1,000 competitors and 4,000 spectators.

== Radio station ==
Coonamble has its own local radio station, 2MTM 91.9FM, which has a wide variety of music from country to modern.

Outback Radio 2WEB broadcasts to the area on 91.1FM.

== Sports ==
The Coonamble Bears play in the Castlereagh Cup Rugby League competition. The Coonamble Rams play in the Western Plains Rugby Union competition.

== Climate ==
Coonamble has a borderline semi-arid/humid subtropical climate (Köppen: BSh/Cfa) with hot summers, mild winters, and erratic rainfall year-round, with a summer maximum. The town is sunny, with 148.7 clear days annually

Climate data for Coonamble (30º58'48"S, 148º22'48"E, 180 m AMSL) (1907-2010 normals and extremes, rainfall 1878-2010)
Month	Jan	Feb	Mar	Apr	May	Jun	Jul	Aug	Sep	Oct	Nov	Dec	Year
Record high °C (°F)	47.8 (118.0)	45.6 (114.1)	44.4 (111.9)	39.4 (102.9)	32.8 (91.0)	27.8 (82.0)	26.7 (80.1)	33.3 (91.9)	37.3 (99.1)	41.1 (106.0)	46.1 (115.0)	46.1 (115.0)	47.8 (118.0)
Mean daily maximum °C (°F)	34.9 (94.8)	33.9 (93.0)	31.4 (88.5)	26.7 (80.1)	21.8 (71.2)	18.0 (64.4)	17.1 (62.8)	19.3 (66.7)	23.4 (74.1)	27.6 (81.7)	31.0 (87.8)	33.7 (92.7)	26.6 (79.8)
Mean daily minimum °C (°F)	19.2 (66.6)	18.9 (66.0)	16.4 (61.5)	11.7 (53.1)	7.8 (46.0)	5.0 (41.0)	3.7 (38.7)	4.6 (40.3)	7.4 (45.3)	11.5 (52.7)	15.1 (59.2)	17.7 (63.9)	11.6 (52.9)
Record low °C (°F)	9.2 (48.6)	7.9 (46.2)	5.4 (41.7)	0.5 (32.9)	−2.3 (27.9)	−3.9 (25.0)	−4.4 (24.1)	−3.7 (25.3)	−0.4 (31.3)	1.8 (35.2)	4.2 (39.6)	9.0 (48.2)	−4.4 (24.1)
Average precipitation mm (inches)	60.9 (2.40)	55.1 (2.17)	44.5 (1.75)	35.9 (1.41)	39.3 (1.55)	37.0 (1.46)	36.0 (1.42)	32.2 (1.27)	32.4 (1.28)	41.5 (1.63)	43.3 (1.70)	47.0 (1.85)	504.9 (19.88)
Average precipitation days (≥ 1.0 mm)	4.5	4.4	3.7	3.1	3.7	4.5	4.2	4.2	3.9	4.4	4.2	4.3	49.1
Average afternoon relative humidity (%)	35	38	37	40	49	54	55	44	41	34	34	33	41
Average dew point °C (°F)	13.6 (56.5)	14.4 (57.9)	11.9 (53.4)	9.4 (48.9)	8.4 (47.1)	7.1 (44.8)	6.3 (43.3)	4.8 (40.6)	6.4 (43.5)	7.1 (44.8)	9.4 (48.9)	11.4 (52.5)	9.2 (48.5)
Source: Bureau of Meteorology (1907-2010 extremes)

== Heritage listings ==
Coonamble has a number of heritage-listed sites, including:

- Dubbo–Coonamble railway: Coonamble railway station

== Notable people ==
- Ron Boden, rugby league player
- Alex Cullen, journalist
- Ned Hanigan, rugby player
- Lancelot Hansen, rugby league player
- Eddie Murray, rugby league player, notable Aboriginal death in custody
- Mary Quirk, politician
- Jesse Ramien, rugby league player
- Thomas Tyrrell, trade unionist and politician
- Adriano Zumbo, pâtissier and chef
- Braiden Burns, rugby league player
- Max Jackson, country singer

== See also ==
- Coonamble railway line
- Coonamble Airport
