= Coonamble railway station =

Railway station in New South Wales, Australia

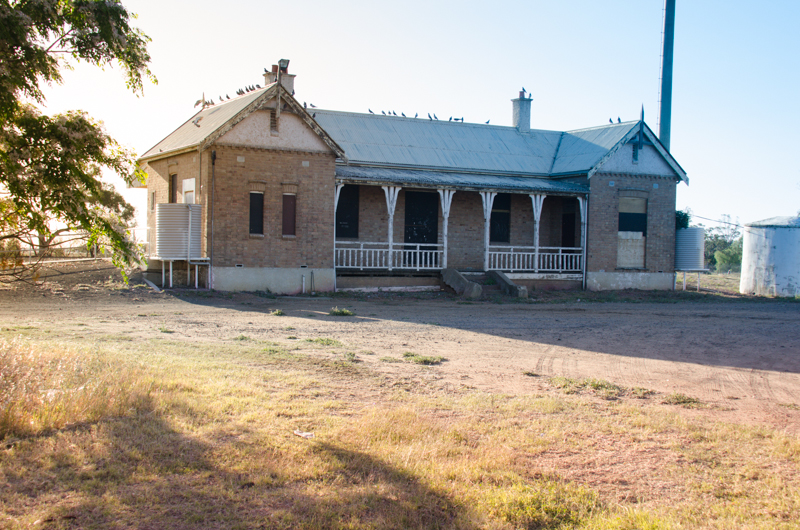

- Location within New South Wales Location within Australia
- 30.9557°S 148.3795°E
- Location: Coonamble railway line, Coonamble, Coonamble Shire, New South Wales, Australia

Site notes
- Owner: Transport Asset Manager of New South Wales

New South Wales Heritage Register
- Official name: Coonamble Railway Station and Yard Group; 01117
- Type: state heritage (complex / group)
- Designated: 2 April 1999
- Reference no.: 1117
- Type: Railway Platform / Station
- Category: Transport – Rail

Coonamble railway station is a heritage-listed former railway station at Coonamble in the Orana region of New South Wales, Australia. It served as the terminus for passenger services on the Coonamble railway line and was added to the New South Wales State Heritage Register on 2 April 1999.

== History ==
The Coonamble railway line was completed to Coonamble in 1903. The original station was burnt to the ground in a May 1910 fire. The station was subsequently rebuilt, and the current station buildings date from this time.

In 2007, media reports suggested that the station was at risk of being demolished after the Australian Rail Track Corporation expressed concern about frequent vandalism causing maintenance and safety issues. The Coonamble Shire Council were looking for a possible tenant at that time to secure the building's future.

The station received $131,045 in federal government heritage funding for protection and conservation works in 2009. The station platform had been recently reconstructed in 2015.

== Description ==
The heritage-listed complex consists of a brick station building in a type 16 pioneer design with an awning, dating from 1910.

The original heritage listing also included a timber goods shed, also from 1910, but it has subsequently been reported that it is no longer extant.

== Heritage listing ==
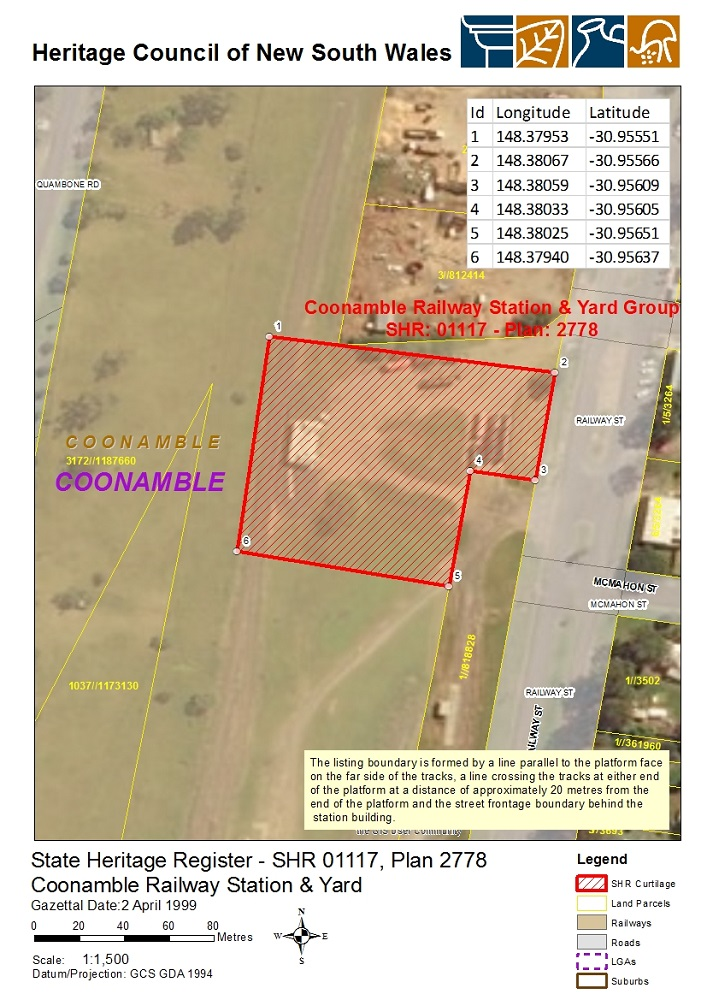
Heritage boundaries

Coonamble is a site of high significance as a pioneer site with a brick building in "as built" form. It appears to be the only such example in the State, the other brick building of the same type being Narrabri which has been altered. The intactness of the station group is also of significance.

The building is an important civic building, well detailed and proportioned and has the unusual use of rough cast on the gables with non standard timber detailing. The associated buildings add to the completeness of the site giving context to the station building.

Coonamble railway station was listed on the New South Wales State Heritage Register on 2 April 1999 having satisfied the following criteria.

The place possesses uncommon, rare or endangered aspects of the cultural or natural history of New South Wales.

This item is assessed as historically rare. This item is assessed as scientifically rare. This item is assessed as arch. rare. This item is assessed as socially rare.
