= Main Western railway line =

Railway line in New South Wales, Australia

Overview
- Termini: Granville; Dubbo
- Stations: 48 open

Technical
- Line length: 484 km (301 mi)
- Num of tracks: 4 (Granville – St Marys); 2 (St Marys – Wallerawang); 1 (Wallerawang – Tarana); 2 (Tarana – Kelso); 1 (Kelso – Dubbo)
- Track gauge: 1,435 mm (4 ft 8 1/2 in) standard gauge
- Signalling: CTC from Sydney to Dubbo; Train Order Working from Dubbo to Narromine
- Train protection system: ETCS within Sydney; TMACS from Dubbo to Narromine

The Main Western railway line or Great Western Railway is a major railway in New South Wales, Australia. It runs through the Blue Mountains, and Central West regions. It is 825 kilometres (513 mi) long, of which 484 kilometres (301 mi) is currently operational.

== Description of route ==
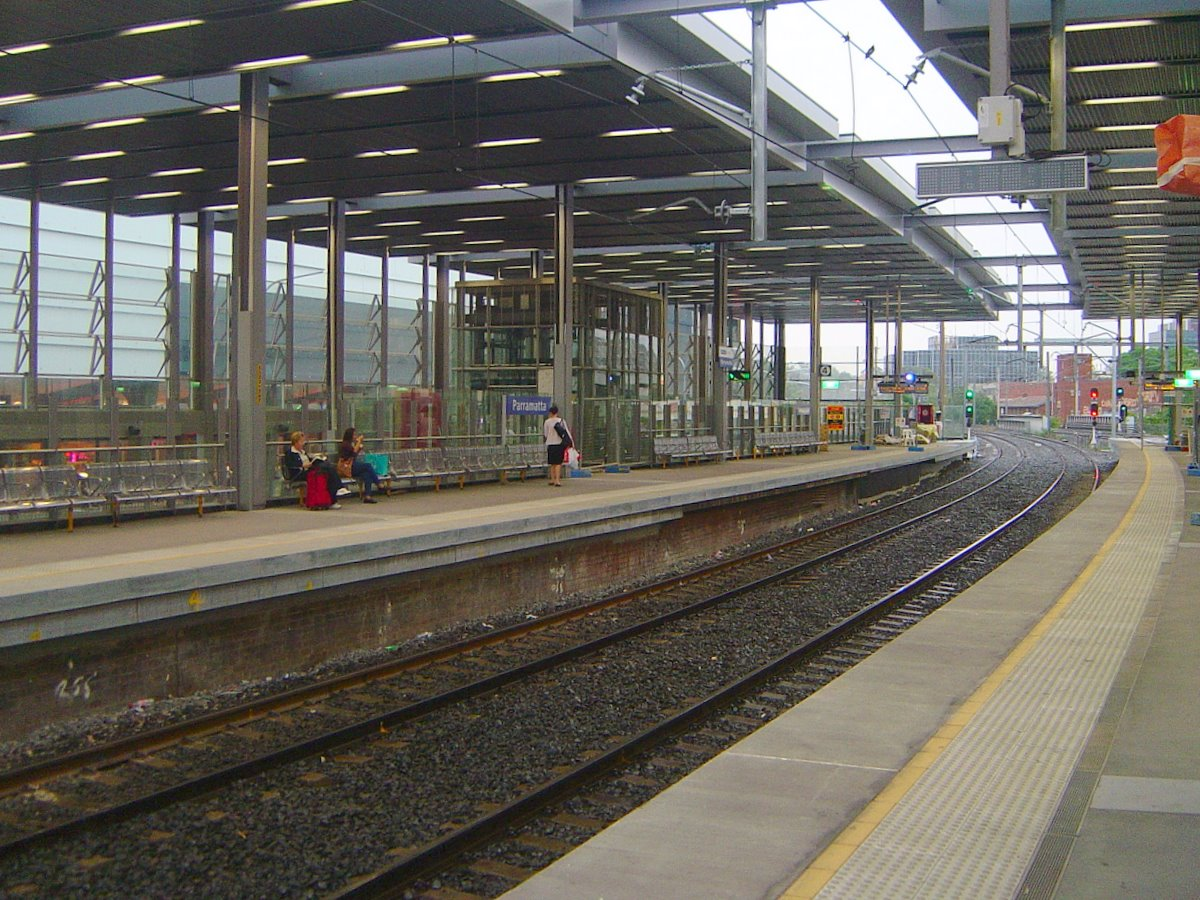
Parramatta is a major station in Sydney

The Main Western Railway Line is a westwards continuation of what is known as the Main Suburban Line between Sydney Central station and Granville. The line is six electrified railway tracks between Central and Strathfield, where the Main Northern line branches off. The line is then four tracks as it passes through Lidcombe, where the Main Southern line branches off, and then through the Sydney suburbs of Parramatta and Blacktown, where the Richmond railway line branches off. At St Marys, the line becomes two tracks as it passes through Penrith and Emu Plains, the extent of Sydney suburban passenger train operation. From Emu Plains, the line traverses the Blue Mountains passing through Katoomba and Mount Victoria before descending down the western side of the Blue Mountains through ten tunnels to Lithgow. Lithgow is the extent of urban electric passenger train services, although the electric wires extend slightly to Bowenfels. The line then proceeds through Wallerawang, where the line becomes single track, and then passes through Tarana, Bathurst, Blayney, Orange (where the Broken Hill line branches), Wellington, Dubbo, Narromine, Nevertire, Nyngan, Byrock and to Bourke. The section between Nyngan and Bourke is now closed. The Central West XPT operates as far as Dubbo.

== History ==
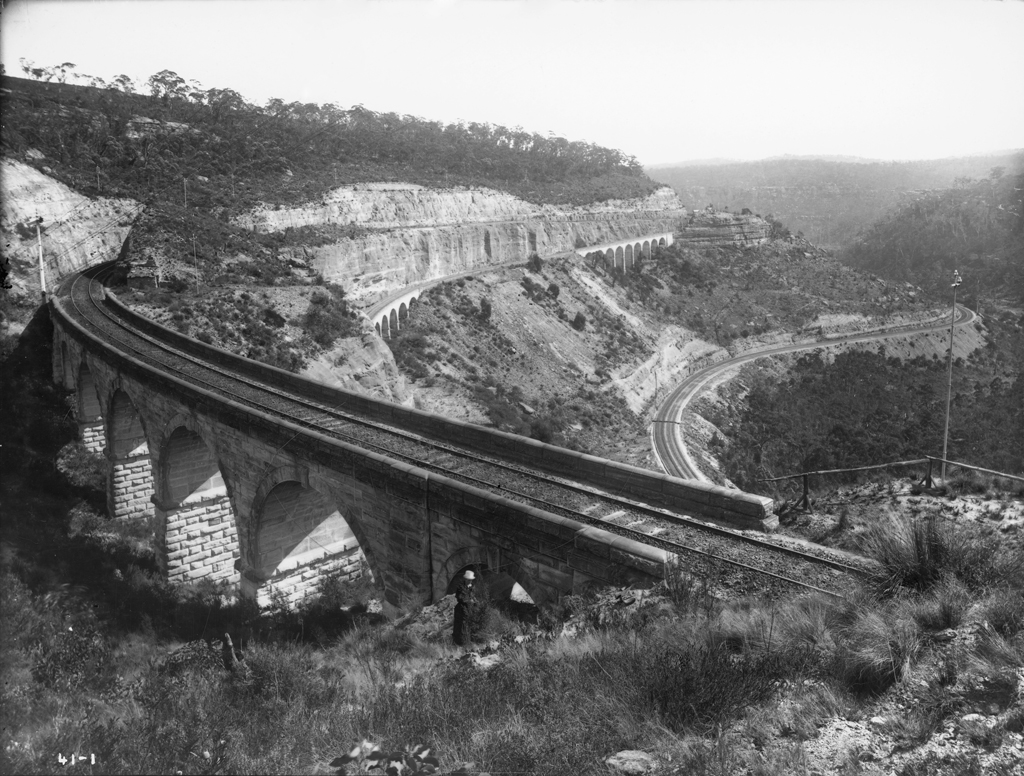
The Lithgow Zig Zag (photo circa 1900)

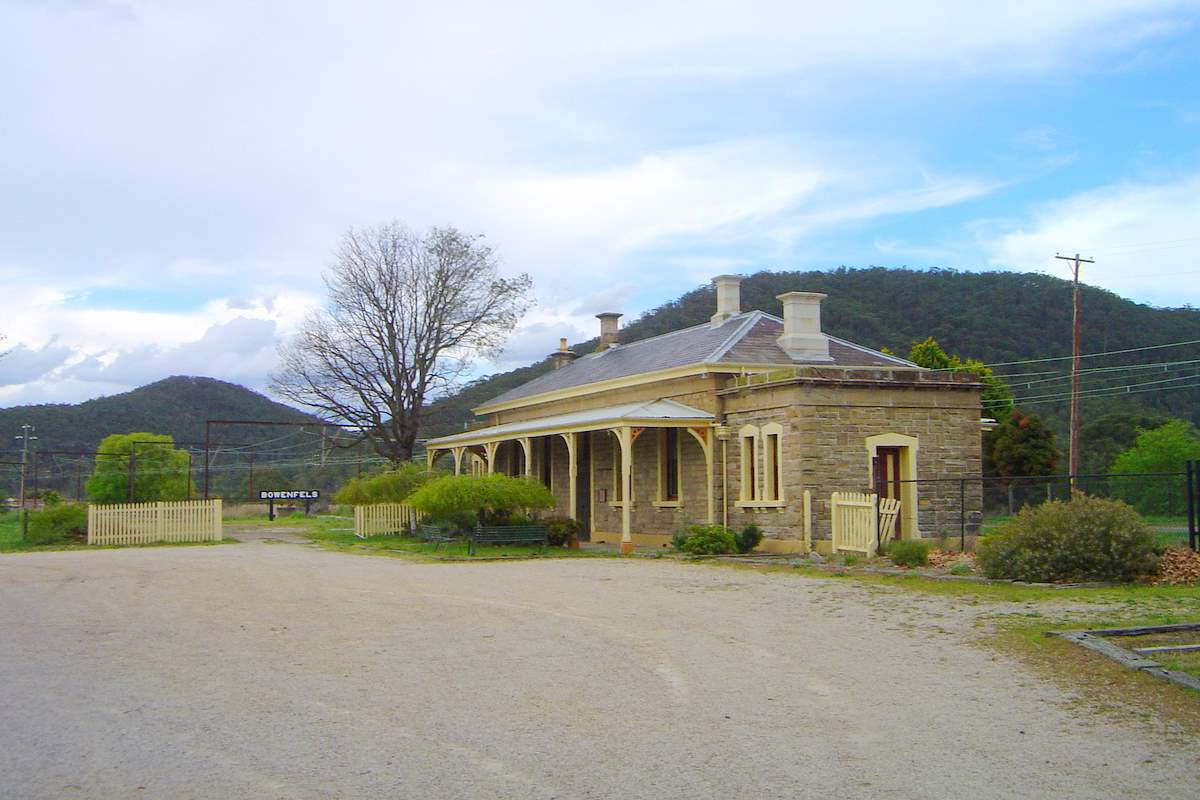
Bowenfels, the former limit of electrification

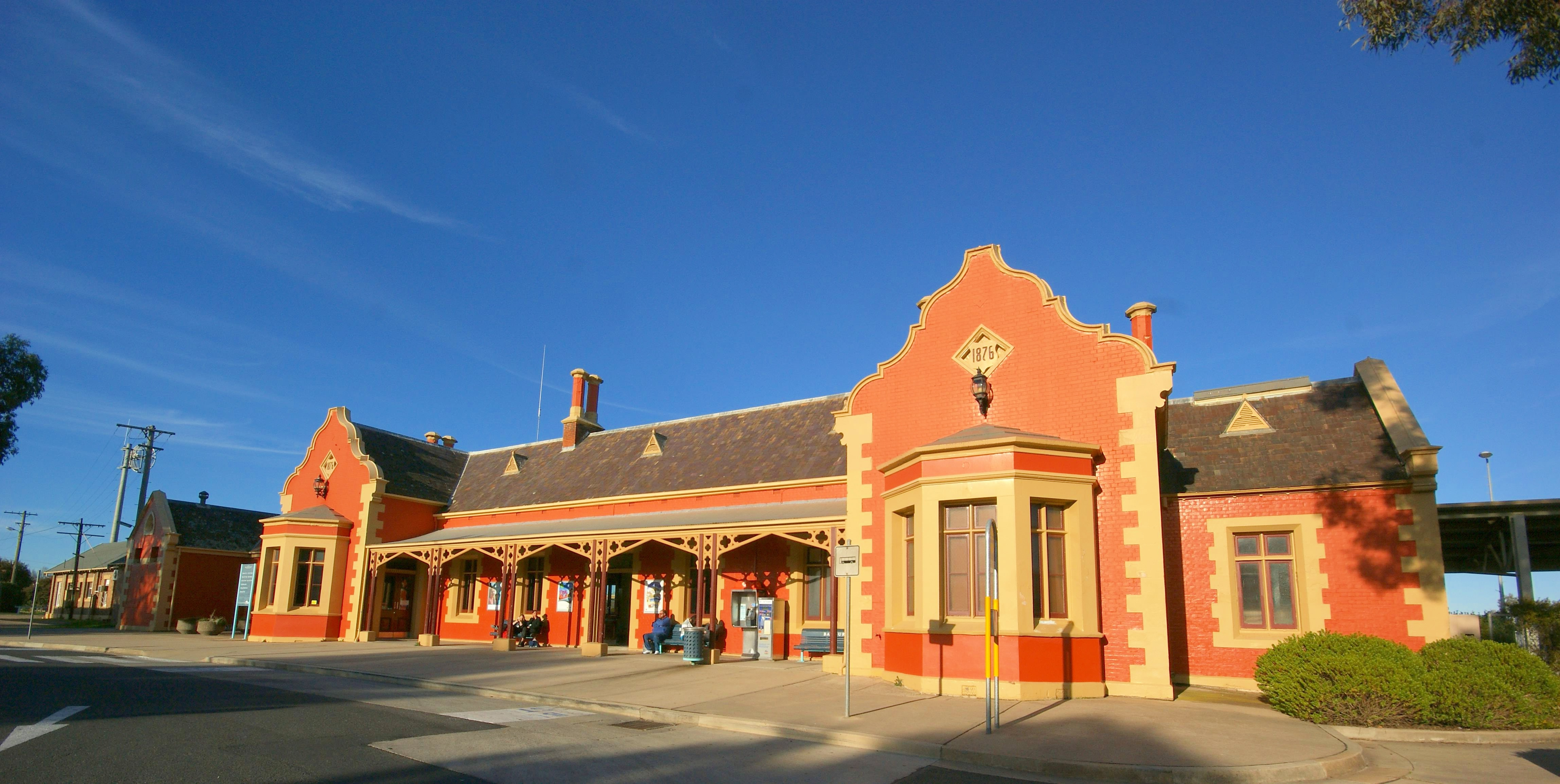
Bathurst station

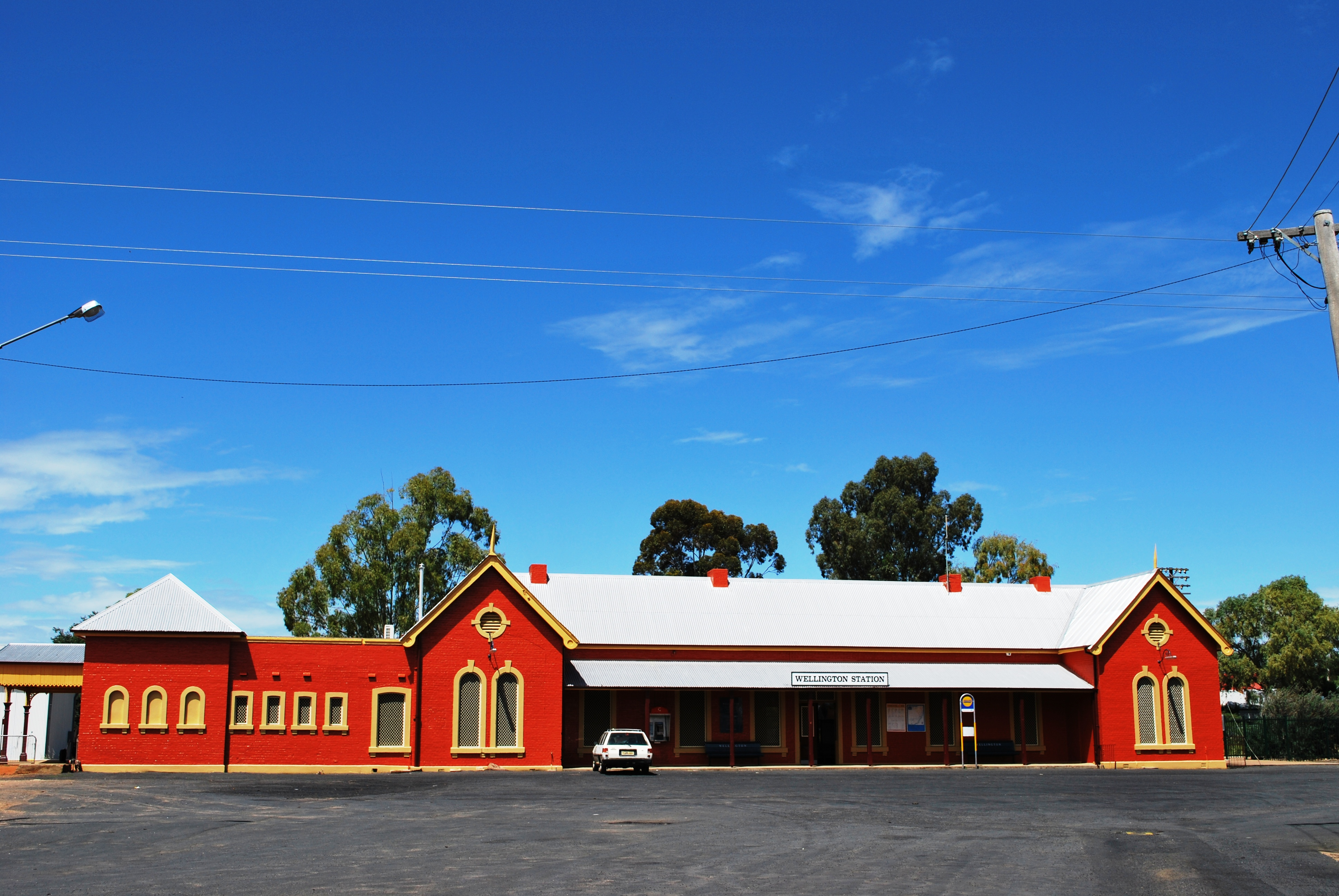
Wellington station

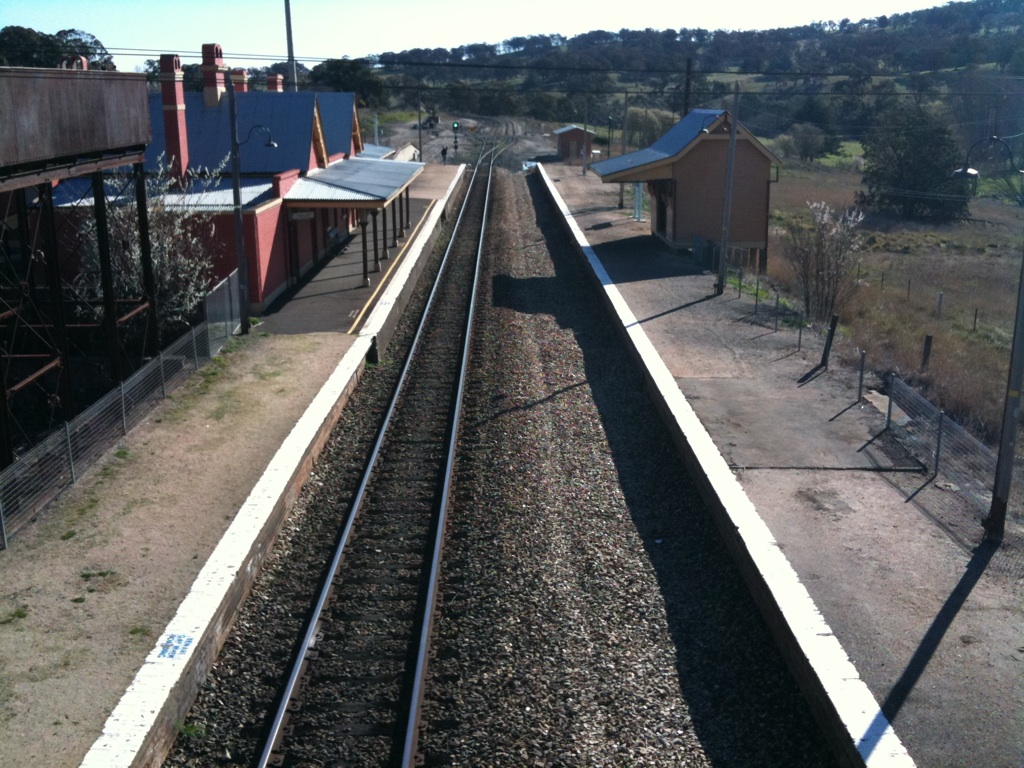
The line through Tarana station has been reduced to single track

The Sydney Railway Company, a private company established to serve the interests of the port of Sydney, announced proposals to build a railway line to Bathurst in 1848. The company was taken over by the New South Wales Government in 1854, and in 1855 the first railway in the state was opened between Sydney and the present-day Granville (see Rail transport in New South Wales). This railway was extended from Granville to the current Parramatta station and Blacktown in 1860 and Penrith in 1863.

The railway then crossed the Blue Mountains between 1867 and 1869. The Blue Mountains were a significant geographical barrier to the development of western New South Wales, and the crossing required significant feats of engineering for the railways, including two 'Zig Zags': one for the ascent at Lapstone, and another for the western descent. The first "little" zigzag line opened near Glenbrook in 1867 as part of the ascent of Lapstone Hill on a gradient of 1 in 30–33. It was built with comparatively light earthwork, although it included a substantial seven-span sandstone viaduct (the Knapsack Viaduct) built by engineer, John Whitton. By 1910, the line was replaced with a gentler alignment with 1 in 60 (1.67%) grades. The line reached Wentworth Falls in 1867 and Mount Victoria in 1868.

On the western descent from the Blue Mountains, the Lithgow Zig Zag was constructed between 1866 and 1869. It was laid out in the shape of a 'Z' including reversing points. It involved extremely heavy rock cuttings, three fine stone viaducts with 30-foot (9.1 m) semi-circular arches and a short tunnel. The Lithgow Zig Zag was replaced in 1910 by a deviation, which included ten tunnels.

From the western foot of the Blue Mountains, the line was promptly extended to Wallerawang by 1870, Tarana in 1872, Bathurst, Blayney in 1876 and Orange in 1877.

By 1877, there was significant political pressure to minimise the diversion of trade from western New South Wales to Victoria and South Australia via river trade along the Darling and Murray Rivers. The town of Bourke had become the key centre for pastoralists in western New South Wales since its formation in 1861. Provision was thus made to extend the line to Dubbo, reaching Wellington in 1880 and Dubbo in 1881. At the time, Dubbo had grown into a town of strategic importance on the stock routes between northern New South Wales and the Victorian goldfields.

Beyond Dubbo, the railway opened up new land to European settlement, and was directly responsible for the development of townships. The line reached the future site of Narromine in 1883, and the railway station was the first building in the future settlement. The line reached the site of Nevertire in 1882, serving the nearby established village of Warren (a branch opened to Warren in 1898). Construction reached the site of Nyngan in 1883, with the nearby coach-stop village of Canonbar moving in its entirety to establish the town of Nyngan. Beyond Nyngan, the line swept across the plains in a straight line for 116 miles (187 km), then the longest stretch of straight railway line in the world. It reached the temporary terminus of Byrock in 1884 before reaching its final destination of Bourke in 1885.

Wool and livestock was the main source of goods traffic on the line throughout its life. In the 1890s a severe drought caused a significant downturn in traffic. In the following decade a branch to Brewarrina (in 1901) increased its catchment while that to Walgett (in 1908) from another artery, reduced its catchment area. The line beyond Dubbo became loss-making in 1901, and continued that way throughout its existence. Tonnages increased following World War 2, but declined from the 1970s. Passenger services beyond Dubbo ended in 1974.

In 1949, the Joint Coal Board announced that coal production would dramatically increase within the next decade, and so the electrification of the Blue Mountains section of the Main West would be essential to meet this expected growth. Whilst a number of circumstances emerged during the early 1950s threatened to delay the project, in 1956, plans were pushed through so that the line over the Blue Mountains was electrified. Originally planned to reach as far as Wallerawang, the project was later truncated at Lithgow (Bowenfels) due to the expected growth in coal traffic failed meet expectations. Large exchange sidings were built at Wallerawang in order to cater for the expected traffic. The surplus equipment that had been ordered for the project between Lithgow (Bowenfels) and Wallerawang was later moved to the Central Coast, enabling the electrification of the Main North between Hornsby and Gosford.

Electrification reached Parramatta in 1928 and Penrith in 1955, and reached Bowenfels on 9 June 1957, allowing the withdrawal of steam operations over the mountains. From this date, freight was hauled over the Blue Mountains by the Metropolitan-Vickers Beyer-Peacock built 46 class locomotives, later by the Commonwealth Engineering of Granville N.S.W built 85 Class, and then the Commonwealth Engineering of Granville N.S.W 86 Class.

With revised methods of working long distance freight trains reducing locomotive changes on-route, usage of electric locomotives began to change in March 1998. In February 2002, the NSW government owned Freightcorp and Commonwealth government owned National Rail, were purchased by a consortium of the Lang Corporation and Toll Holdings, leading to the formation of a private company trading as Pacific National. By the middle of June there were only seven 86 class units remaining in service. It was decided by this company that these remaining electric locomotives were surplus to requirements and all were withdrawn from service on 30th June 2002. Sunday 30 June saw the last freight train to use these locomotives, being CA16 from Clarence Colliery to Inner Harbour hauled by 8628, 8627, 8607 and 8606. The last locomotives available for service were 8641 and 8646 which were held at Enfield into early July. Since then, goods trains over the Blue Mountains are now exclusively diesel hauled, with the only electric trains being passenger services using double deck interurban cars.

By 1980, quadruplication of the track between Blacktown and St Marys was completed. With the introduction of the XPT, the tracks between Blacktown & St Marys were authorised for 160 km/h XPT track speeds by the State Rail Authority in 1982. These speeds were subsequently reduced to 115 km/h (equal to the prior non-XPT speeds) due to signalling deficiencies (related to emergency trip-braking at high speeds) being discovered in 2006 by CityRail engineers. The deficiencies were not addressed with the introduction of ATP in 2021 and the lowered-speeds were permanently programmed into the new system.

In the 1990s the operator of interstate freight, the National Rail Corporation, made the decision to divert Sydney- Perth traffic from the Blue Mountains section, to travel via the Main South line to Cootamundra, and then via the cross country line to Parkes. This resulted in reduced goods traffic and subsequent reduction of the line between Wallerawang and Tarana from double to single track. Significant flooding saw the line cut between Nyngan and Bourke in April 1989, and the army destroyed a section of track north of Nyngan to relieve flood waters surrounding the town. It was not financially viable to repair and maintain the line, and the line was thus abandoned between Nyngan and Bourke.

== Branch lines ==
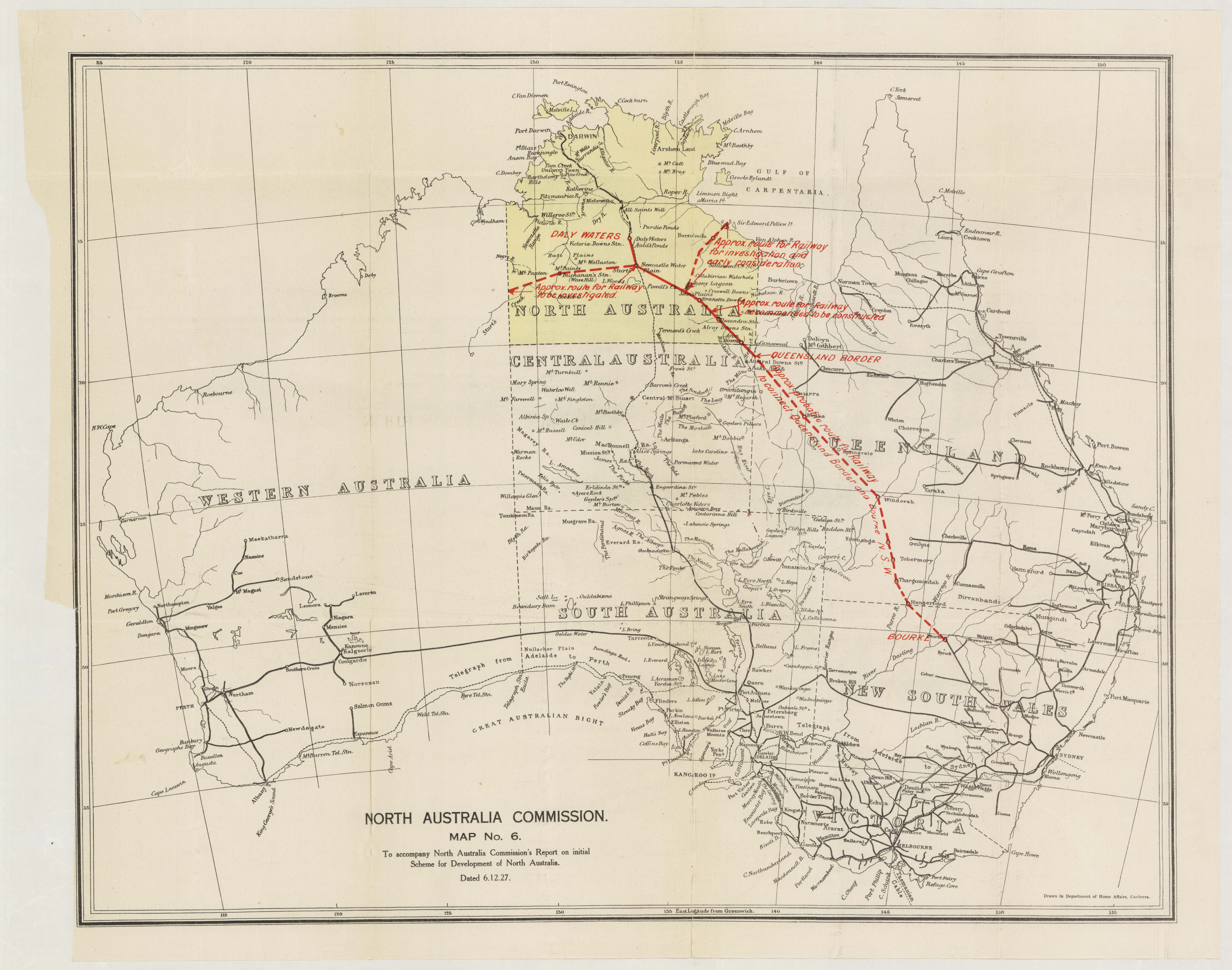
1927 North Australia Commission map showing a proposal to connect the Main Western railway line with the North Australia Railway, linking Sydney and Darwin

Numerous branch lines were constructed from the Main Western Line, which served as the principal railway route through western New South Wales.

While some of these branch lines remain open, either in whole or in part, others have since closed.

Built Lines

- Newnes Branch - Branched at Newnes Junction (near Clarence), terminating at Newnes (1907).
  - Operated between 1907 and 1932, line was built by Commonwealth Oil Corporation to service their oil shale mine.
    - One tunnel has become home to glow worms and is now known as the Glowworm Tunnel.
- Gwabegar line - Branches at Wallerawang, passing through Capertee (1882), Mudgee (1884), Gulgong (1909), Dunedoo (1910), Coonabarabran (1917), terminating Gwabegar (1923).
  - Connects Merrygoen with Troy Junction (Dubbo) via Troy Junction – Merrygoen Cross Country Line
    - line currently open between Wallerawang and Rylstone, and Gulgong and Binnaway
- Oberon Branch - Branched at Tarana, terminating at Oberon (1923).
  - Currently being restored from the Oberon end by the The Oberon Tarana Heritage Railway Inc.
- Blayney – Harden Cross Country Line - Branched at Blayney (1876), passed through Cowra (1886/7), Young (1885), connecting at Demondrille (1885).
  - Line currently closed, although limited tourist services operate a Cowra by Lachlan Valley Railway
- Cadia Branch - Branched at Spring Hill (1877), terminating at Cadia iron ore mine.
  - Privately operated from 1918 to 1929, Government operated1943 to 1945.
- Broken Hill Branch - Branches at Orange East Fork (1877), passes through Molong (1885), Parkes (1893), Condobolin (1898), Ivanhoe (1925), Menindee (1919), terminating Broken Hill (1919).
  - Connected Molong with Dubbo (East Junction) via Molong – Dubbo Cross County Line
  - Connects Goobang Junction (Parkes) with Narromine (1883) via Parkes – Narromine Cross Country Line
  - Now the mainline between Sydney to Perth
- Troy Junction – Merrygoen Cross Country Line - Connects Troy Junction (Dubbo) with Merrygoen
  - Provides link with Hunter Valley/Newcastle via Sandy Hollow – Gulgong Cross Country Line
- Dubbo – Molong Cross County Line - Connected Dubbo (East Junction) with Molong
  - Built 1925 to provide easier grades between Sydney and Burke
- Coonamble Branch - Branches at Dubbo, passing through Gilgandra (1903), terminating Coonamble (1903).
  - Used only for seasonal grain traffic.
- Parkes – Narromine Cross Country Line - Connects Narromine (1883) with Goobang Junction (Parkes) (1914)
  - Provides link with Main Southern Railway via Parkes – Stockinbingal (Forbes) Cross Country Line and Lake Cargelligo Line
- Warren Branch - Branches at Nevertire (1883), terminating at Warren (1898).
  - Used only for seasonal grain traffic.
- The Original (from the Merriwa Branch Railway Line) to Maryvale Triangular Railway Junction on the Main Western Railway Line at 32°26′32.7″S 148°53′59.7″E (Completed from Sandy Hollow to Gulgong Section to the Gwabegar Railway Line at Gulgong only.)
- Cobar Branch Branches at Nyngan (1883), terminating Cobar (1894)
  - Line extended to CSA Mine (12 km (7.5 mi) northwest of Cobar) in 1963.
  - Branch line built from CSA Junction to Elura Mine 1982
- Brewarrina Branch Branched at Byrock (1884), terminating Brewarrina (1901).

Proposed Line

Maryvale to Sandy Hollow Cross Country Line - proposed to provide an alternative connection to the Port of Newcastle via Gulgong (Gwabegar Line), Sandy Hollow (Merriwa Branch), and Main Northern Railway. Works were performed between 1937 and 1951 before being abandoned. During the early 1980s, the section between Gulgong and Sandy Hollow was constructed as the Gulgong – Sandy Hollow Cross County Line to enable coal to be shipped from Ulan to the Port of Newcastle.

== Present operation ==
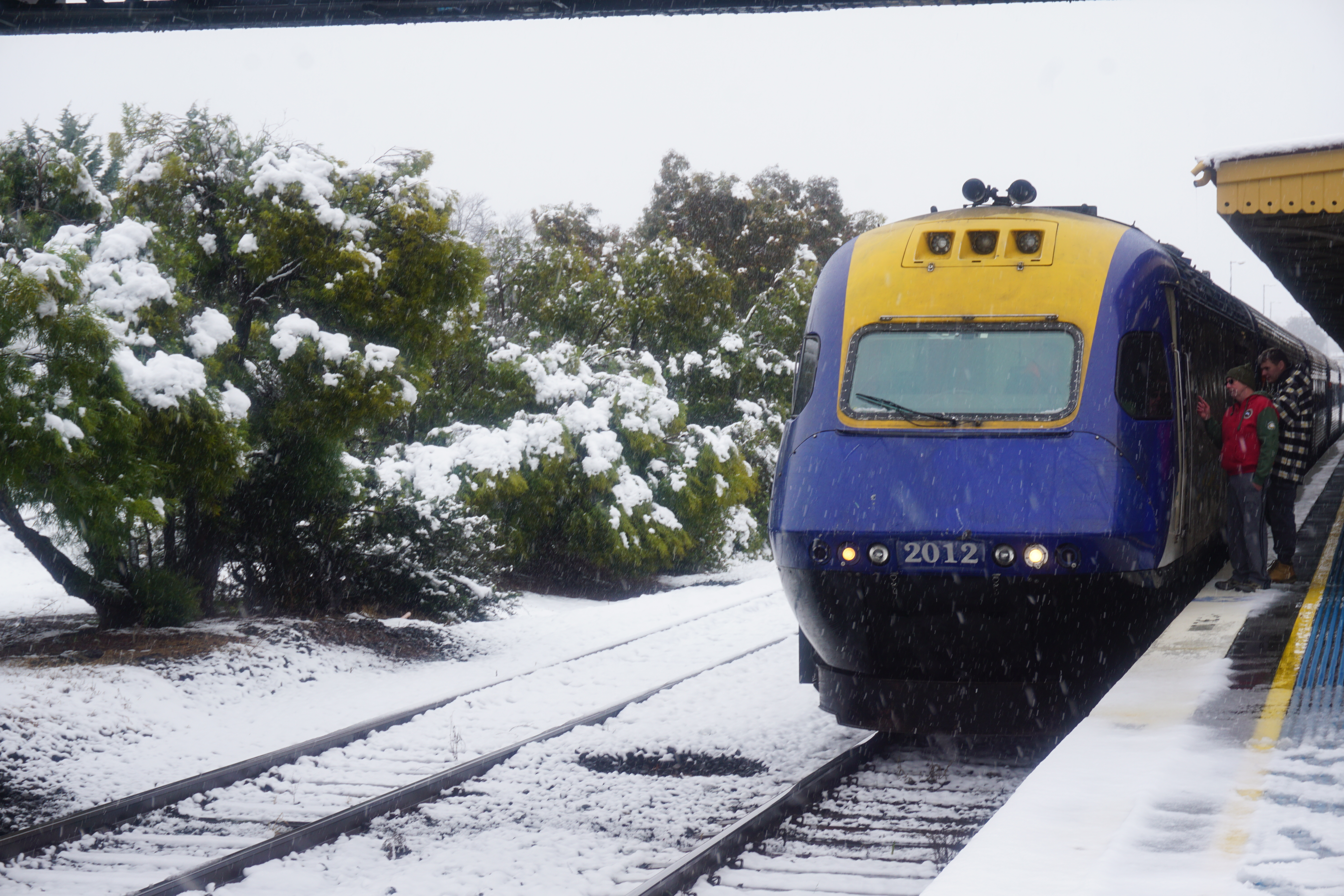
An XPT at Orange in 2020, during a rare snow day

The Main Western Line is no longer operational along its entire length, with trains currently operating between Sydney and Nyngan and stopping at various locations along the route.

Freight Traffic

Freight traffic continues to operate as far as Nyngan, with copper ore hauled from Cobar to the Port of Newcastle.

Intermodal traffic is generated at Dubbo, Blayney and Kelso, with Fletcher International operating three return services per week between Dubbo and Port Botany.

Passenger Traffic

NSW TrainLink operates the Central West Express XPT service to Dubbo, as well as a twice-daily return passenger service to Bathurst using Endeavour DMUs rolling stock.

The Indian Pacific service to Perth via the Broken Hill line, operates over the Main Western Line betweenSydney and Orange, as does the weekly NSW TrainLink Sydney–Broken Hill Xplorer DMU service.

The section of the line between Sydney and Lithgow carries electric commuter services operated as part of the Blue Mountains Line.

High-speed dynamic testing of rolling stock is authorised on a section of the line between Blacktown and St Marys, where sufficient track capacity and overhead wiring infrastructure are available. This section is frequently closed at night to allow testing of new or modified rolling stock at speeds of up to 160 km/h under controlled conditions, as the existing signalling system is not designed for operation at these speeds.
