= Rail transport in New South Wales =

Railway network in New South Wales, Australia

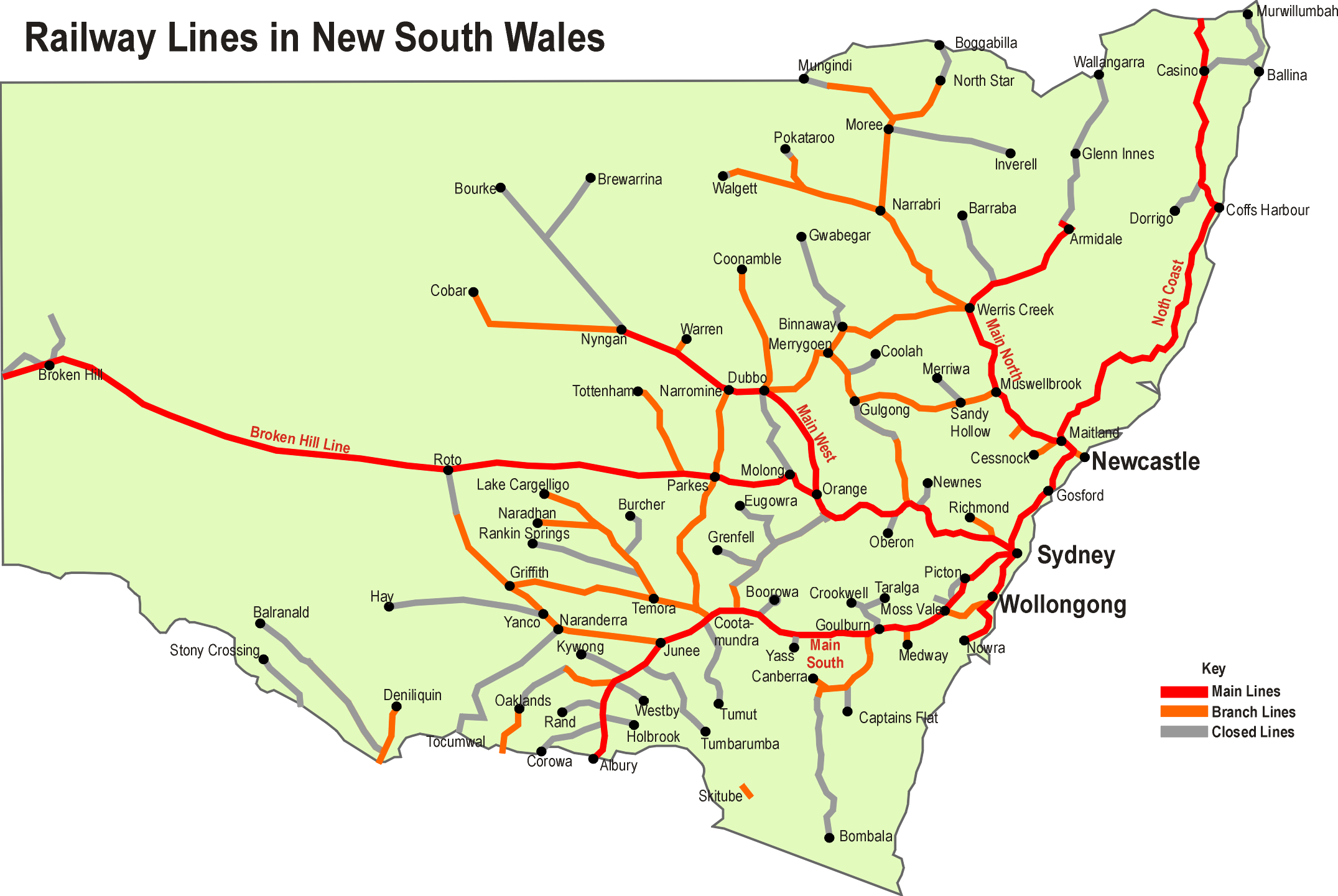
Map of rail lines in NSW

The Australian state of New South Wales has an extensive network of railways, which were integral to the growth and development of the state. The vast majority of railway lines were government built and operated, but there were also several private railways, some of which operate to this day.

== Organisation ==
During the 20th century, the railways have always been run by a state-owned entity, which has undergone a number of different minor name changes, including the New South Wales Railways, New South Wales Government Railways, Department of Railways. From 1972, it was part of the Public Transport Commission and from 1980, the State Rail Authority. In 1989, the SRA was split into CityRail, CountryLink and FreightCorp, the latter business being sold in 2001 to Pacific National.

Three government entities currently have responsibility for the New South Wales heavy rail lines. They are:

- Transport Asset Manager of New South Wales – asset owner
- Sydney Trains – infrastructure operator, maintainer, and operator of suburban and intercity train services, and
- NSW TrainLink – operator of regional and interstate train services

Since 2003, the NSW interstate, Sydney metropolitan freight, Hunter Valley coal, and country branch line networks have been run by private operators. Until January 2012, these networks were all operated by the Australian Rail Track Corporation, however control of the Country Regional (branch line) Network moved to John Holland in January 2012. In January 2022, UGL Regional Linx commenced a 10-year contract to operate the Country Regional Network (CRN).

== History ==
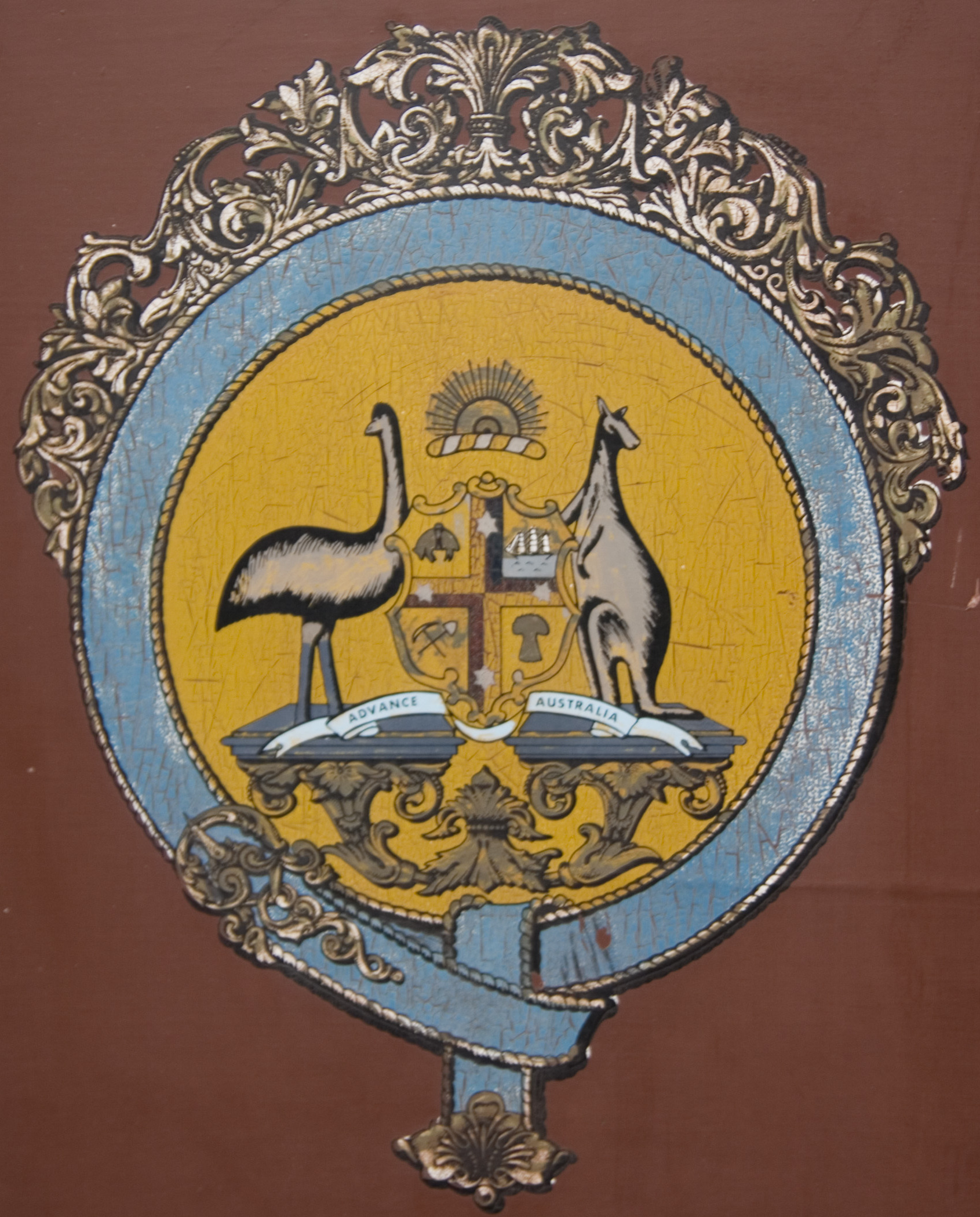
New South Wales Railways logo on passenger car

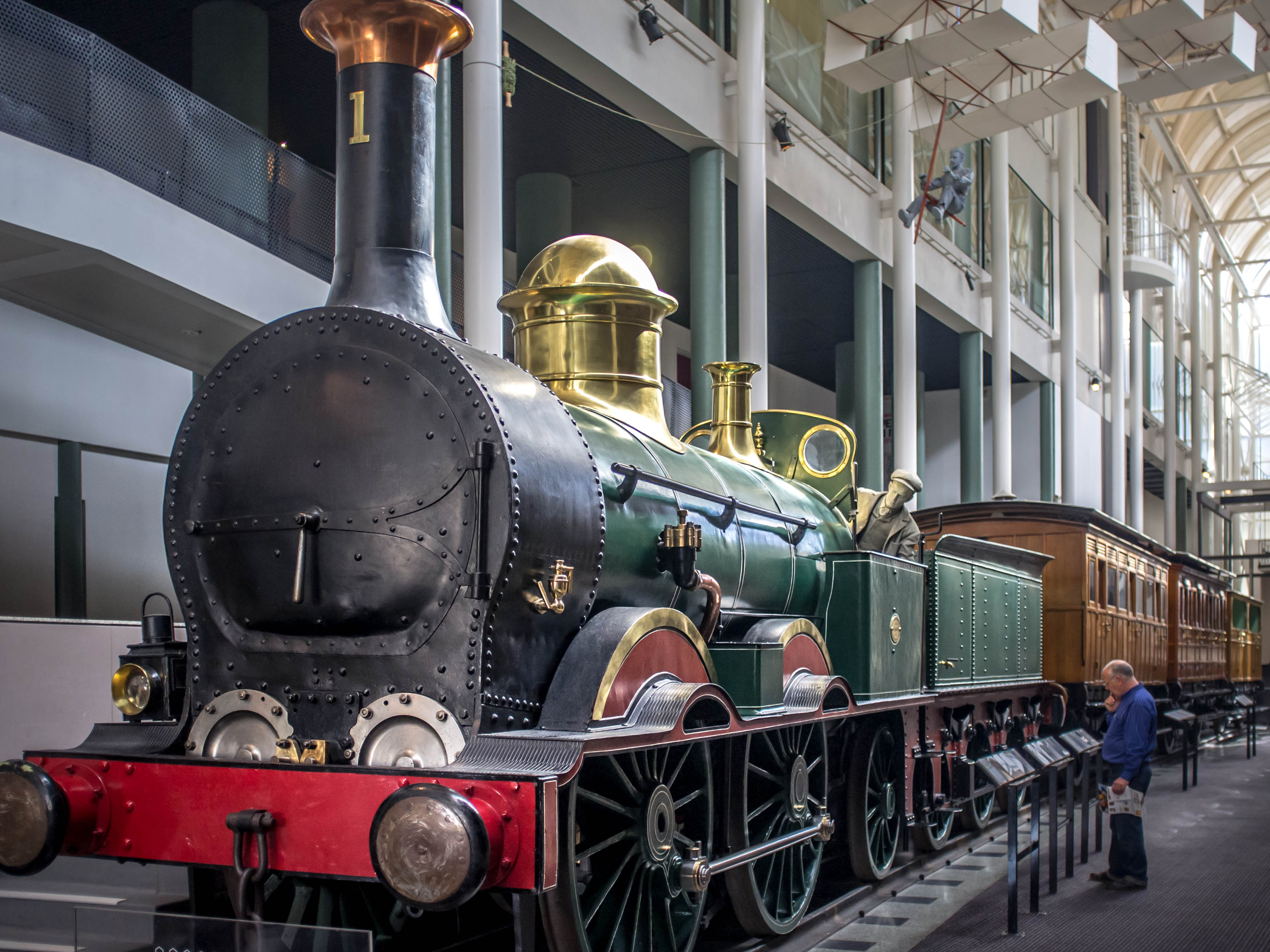
Locomotive No. 1 at the Powerhouse Museum

New South Wales' railways date from 10 December 1831 when the Australian Agricultural Company officially opened Australia's first railway, located at the intersection of Brown and Church Streets, Newcastle. Privately owned and operated to service the A Pit coal mine, it was a cast-iron fishbelly rail on an inclined plane as a gravitational railway.

Many proposals for routing the proposed lines were put forth, researched, surveyed and reported on. Three main routes for the Main Southern line were reported on by Mr Woore. There were three main routes researched for crossing the Blue Mountains requiring much effort just for the surveys.

The first public line was built from Sydney to Parramatta Junction (actually in Granville) and opened in 1855. The first six stations were; Sydney, Newtown, Ashfield, Burwood, Homebush, and Parramatta. The first common-carrier railway to operate in Australia, however, was the Melbourne & Hobson's Bay Railway Company, in Victoria, which opened on 12 September 1854, over a year before the Sydney–Parramatta Railway in NSW, which opened on 26 September 1855.

After two decisions to change the rail gauge, problems in raising capital and difficulties in construction, the line was opened in 1854, and lines have been built to standard gauge ever since. The Main Southern line was built in stages from Parramatta Junction to the Victorian border at Albury between 1855 and 1881 and connected to the Victorian Railways at a break-of-gauge in 1883.

The standard gauge connection from Albury to Melbourne was opened in 1962, completing the Sydney–Melbourne railway. Lines were built to connect the ports of Sydney and Newcastle to the rural interior, and the Main Western line was built from Parramatta Junction line to the north west of the state, reaching Bourke between 1860 and 1885. The Main North line was built from Newcastle to Wallangarra on the Queensland border and connecting with Queensland Railway's line to Brisbane at a break of gauge between 1857 and 1888. Sydney and Newcastle were connected in 1889.

Much of the construction of the Main Western, Main Southern, and Main North lines were completed under the supervision of John Whitton, considered the Father of New South Wales railways, Engineer-in-Charge for the New South Wales Railways, serving between 1856 and 1899.

Construction of the shorter and single-gauge North Coast railway line between Sydney and Brisbane commenced in 1905 and was completed with the opening of the Grafton Bridge in 1932. The last main line was completed to Broken Hill in 1927, connecting with the South Australian Railways at a break of gauge. In 1970, the South Australian section was standardised, completing the Sydney–Perth standard gauge link. Meanwhile, branch lines proliferated over the settled east of the state, including the Illawarra line to Wollongong and Bomaderry completed in 1893. In 1926 work began on electrifying Sydney's urban railways and connecting them together via new lines.

=== Sydney suburban network ===
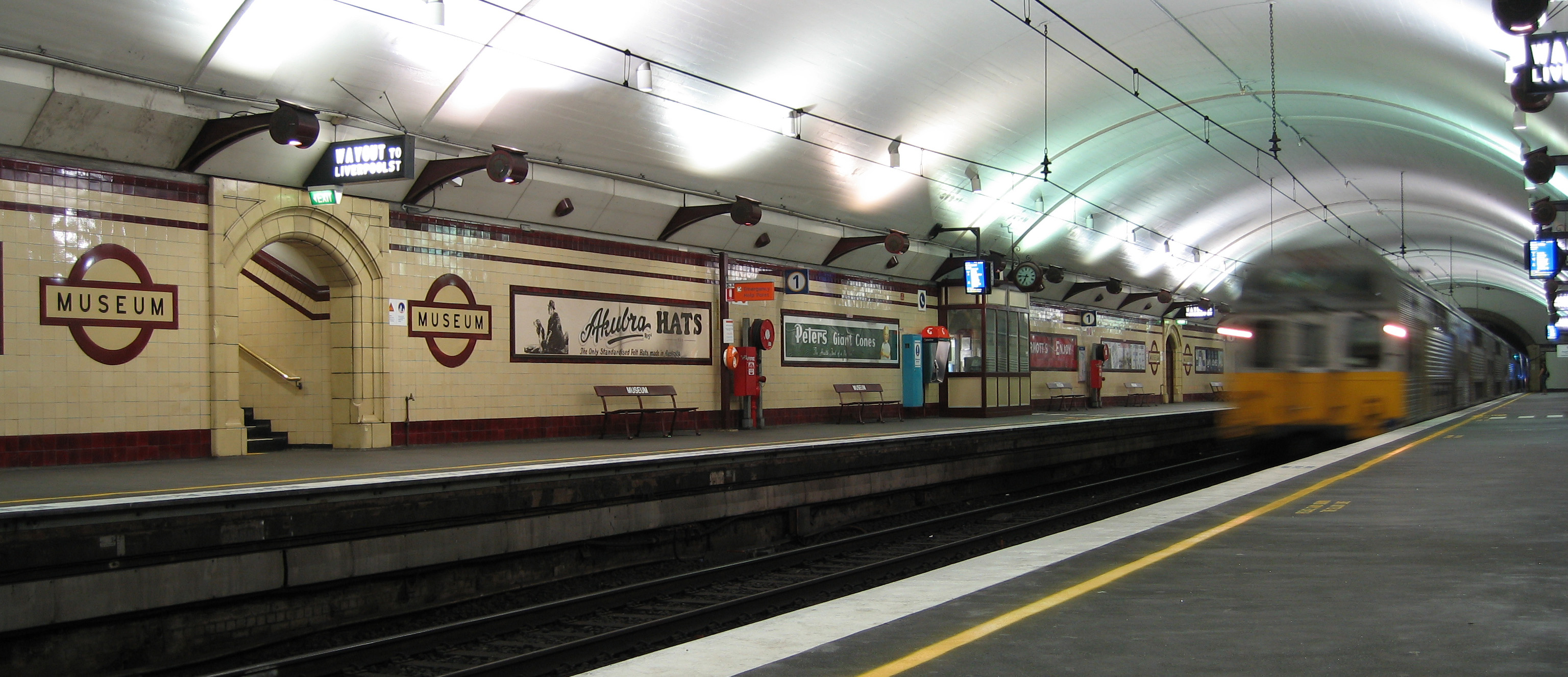
Underground platforms at Museum railway station

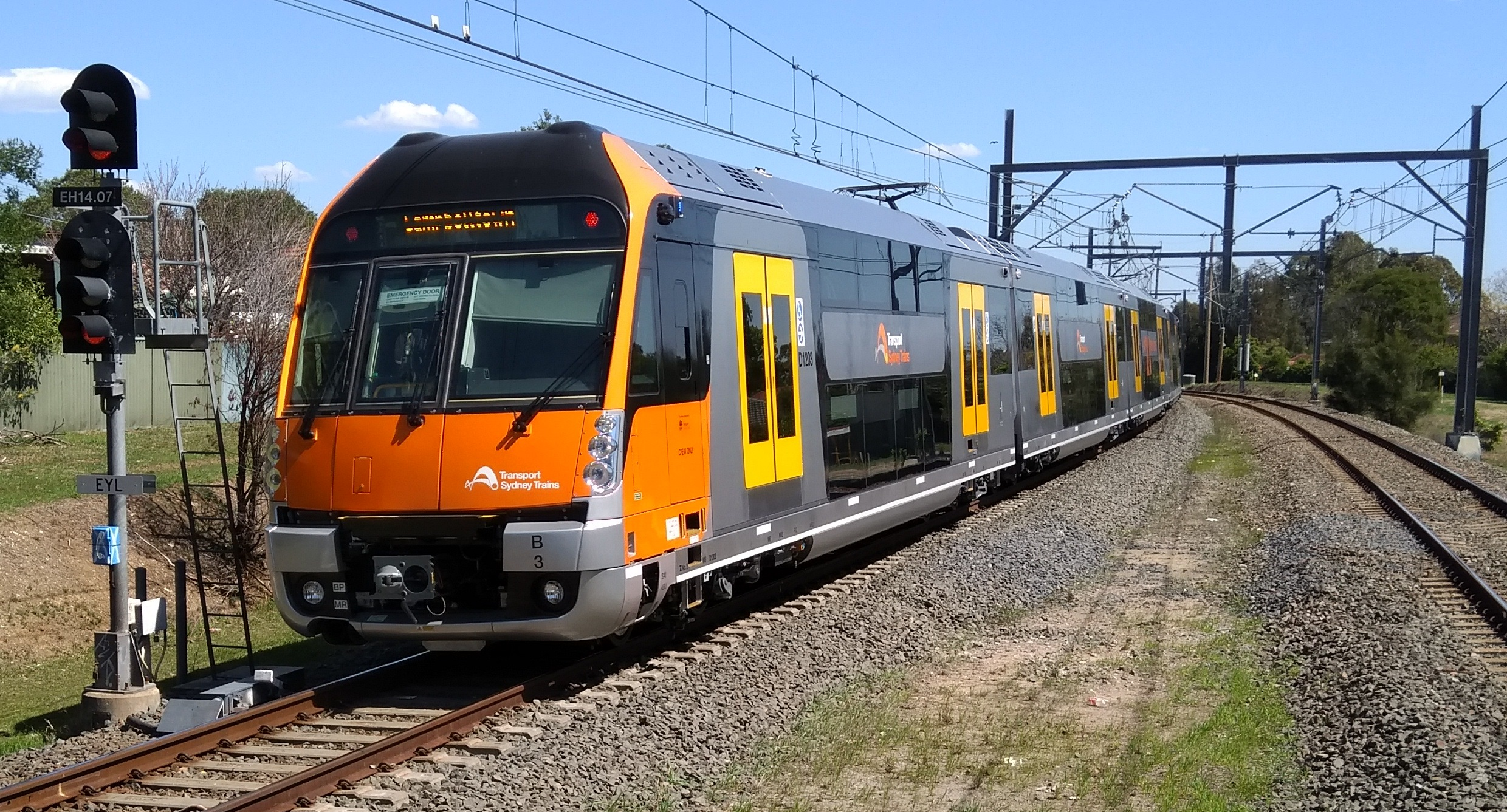
New South Wales B set

The first company to start rail transport in New South Wales was the Sydney Railway Company which was incorporated on 10 October 1849 with the aim of building a railway from Sydney to Parramatta. Capital was raised, shares were sold, and a route was surveyed. The first sod was turned by Mrs Keith Stewart (daughter of the Governor) at Cleveland Paddocks (an area between the southern end of the current Sydney station and Cleveland Street) on 3 July 1850.

The original engineer appointed was Francis Webb Sheilds, an Irishman. He persuaded the New South Wales legislature to pass an Act on 27 July 1852 requiring all railways in the colony to be of 5 ft 3 in (1,600 mm) gauge. This was the gauge in use in Ireland and is now referred to as 1,600 mm (5 ft 3 in) broad gauge. After Sheilds resigned because of the difficulties, a Scot named James Wallace was appointed. Wallace persuaded the legislature to repeal the previous act and replace it, on 4 August 1853, with one requiring a gauge of 4 ft 8 1/2 in (1,435 mm) – the current standard gauge of 1,435 mm (4 ft 8 1/2 in). (Unfortunately for Australia, the legislation requiring the broad gauge had been noted in the colonies of Victoria and South Australia and some rolling stock ordered.)

The Sydney Railway Company encountered many troubles: engineers came and went; real estate required became expensive and difficult to acquire; money, supplies and manpower ran short, partly because of a gold rush. Eventually the property of the Sydney Railway Company was transferred to the government of New South Wales on 3 September 1855.

The line opened on 26 September 1855, from Sydney to Parramatta Junction (near Granville station), with stations at Newtown, Ashfield, Burwood and Homebush. The Sydney terminal station was on the south side of Devonshire Street, just south of the current Central station. Although the vicinity was sometimes referred to as Redfern, it was not near the current Redfern station. This line is still the core line of the Sydney suburban rail system.

Sydney's suburban rail network further developed from main line railways constructed in the 19th century, together with branches built in the late 19th and early 20th century. The existing network was electrified from 1926 at 1500 V DC under a plan by John Bradfield (in the 1920s and 1930s) and later modifications to his plan. In 1932, the Sydney Harbour Bridge was completed and the key inner city line from Central to Town Hall, Wynyard, Milsons Point and North Sydney was opened. In 1956, the Circular Quay station opened, completing the City Circle. The underground Eastern Suburbs railway was completed to Bondi Junction in 1979. In 2000, the line to Sydney Airport and Wolli Creek was opened, with the Epping to Chatswood Rail Link being opened in 2009. The most recent addition to the suburban network is the South West Rail Link, opened in 2015.

A branch line was built from Clyde to Camellia in 1888 and extended to Carlingford in 1896 by private companies. The line went bankrupt in 1896 and the Government purchased and reopened it in 1900. This line was Sydney Trains' Carlingford line which was closed for conversion to light rail.

Another branch was built from Lidcombe to Regents Park in 1912 and extended to join the Main Southern Line at Cabramatta in 1924, creating an alternative route to Liverpool.

=== Main Southern line ===
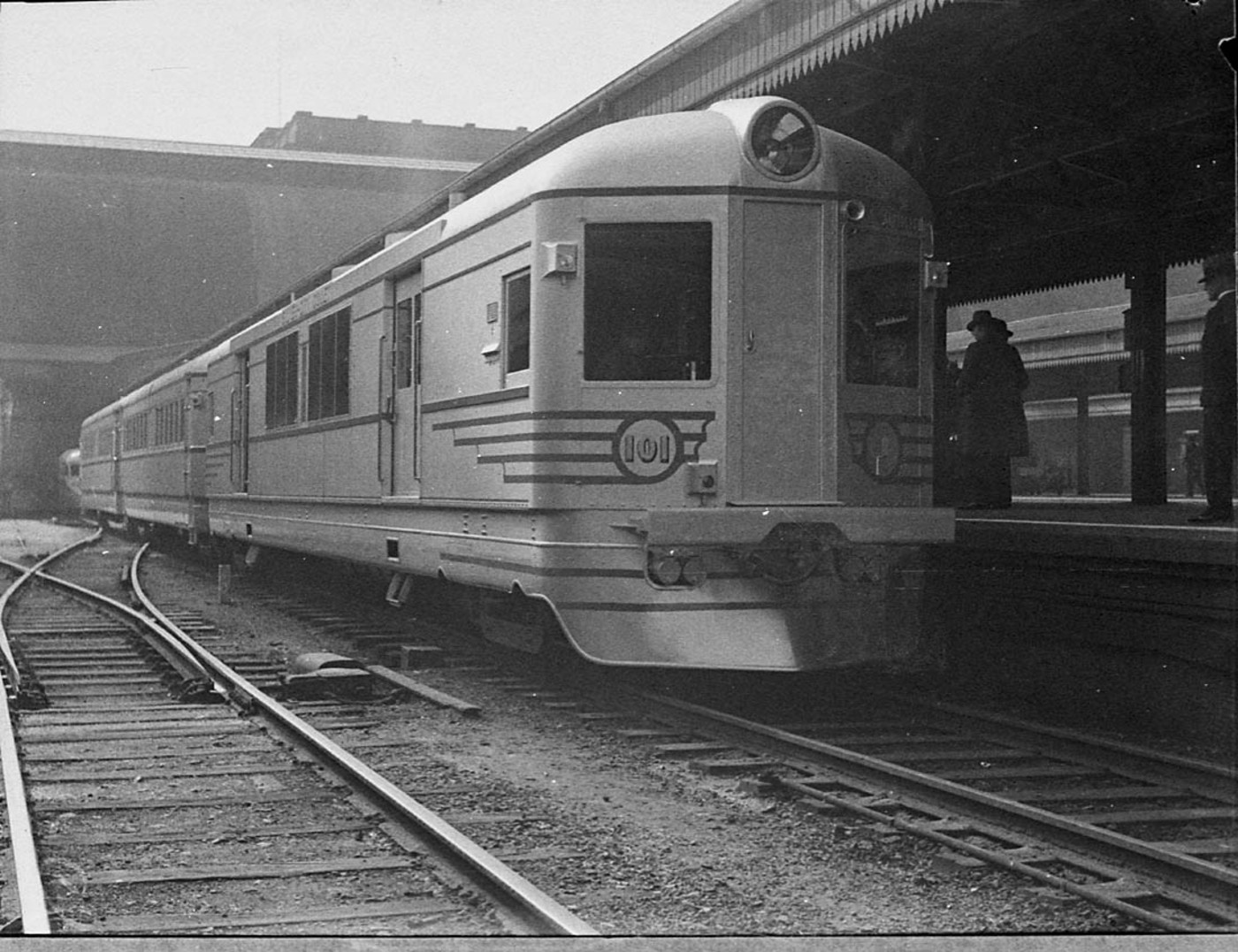
The Silver City Comet at Central station on a test run to Moss Vale, 1937

An extension of the line from Parramatta Junction to Liverpool was opened on the first anniversary of the Sydney–Parramatta line – 26 September 1856. It was extended to Campbelltown in 1858, Picton in 1863, Mittagong in 1867, Marulan in 1868, Goulburn in 1869, Yass Junction in 1876, Binalong in November 1876, Galong, Harden- Murrumburrah and Cootamundra in 1877, Junee in 1878, Wagga Wagga in 1879, Uranquinty, The Rock and Henty in 1880 and Albury in 1881.

Victorian Railways broad gauge line from Wodonga was extended to Albury station in 1883. The standard gauge connection from Albury to Melbourne was completed in 1962. A branch line was opened from Goulburn to Queanbeyan (1885) and Cooma (1887) and an 8 km (5 mi) line from Queanbeyan completed the connection to Canberra in 1914.

=== Main Western line ===
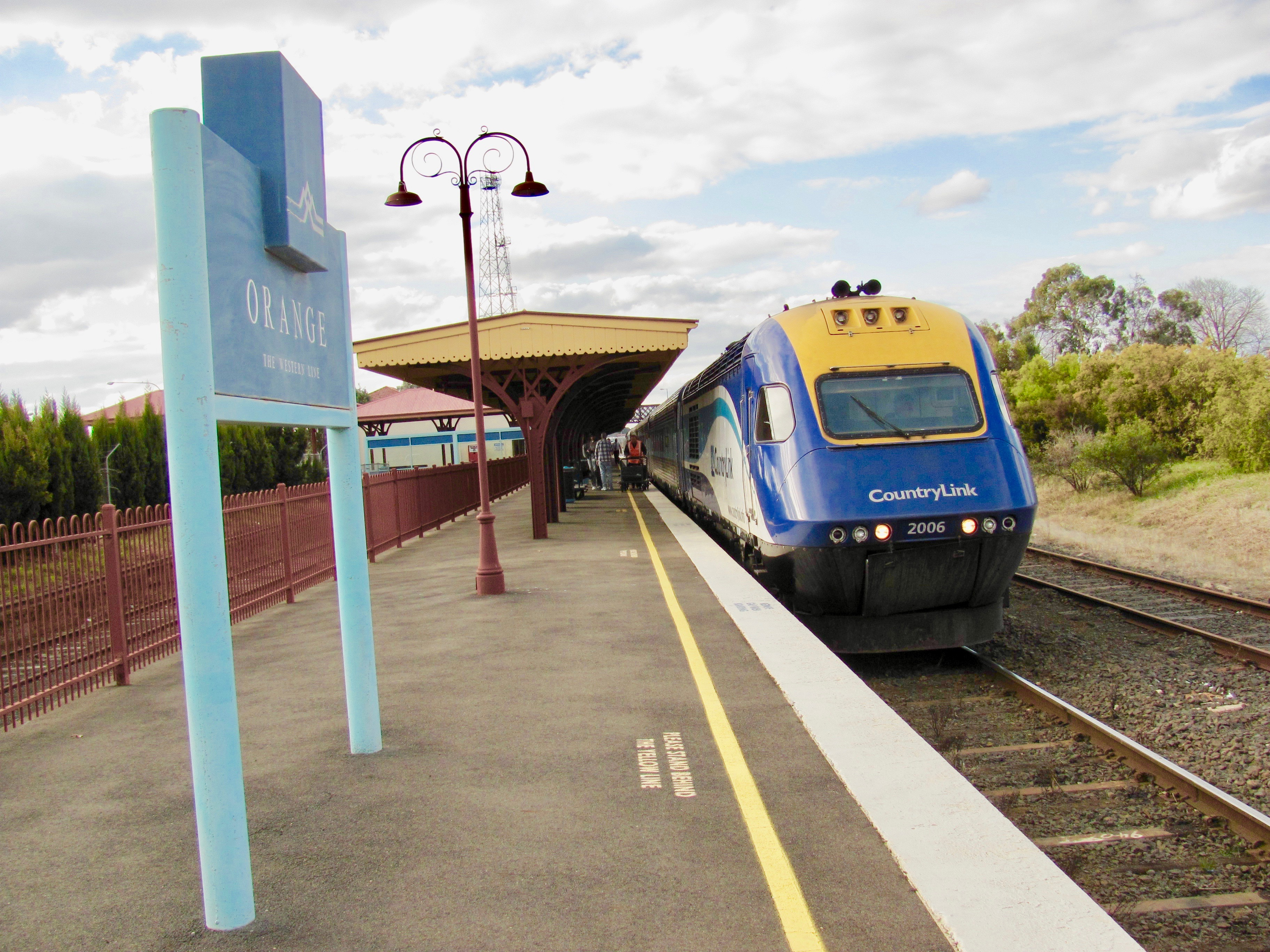
Central West XPT at Orange on the Great Western Railway

The Main Western line was extended from Granville to the current Parramatta station and Blacktown in 1860 and Penrith in 1863. It was built over the difficult topography of the Blue Mountains by using zig zag railways at Lapstone (opened in 1867) and Lithgow (opened in 1869). Both of these sections were replaced by deviations, using tunnels by 1913. The line was extended to Bathurst (1876), Orange (1877), Dubbo (1881), and Bourke (1885).

=== Broken Hill line ===
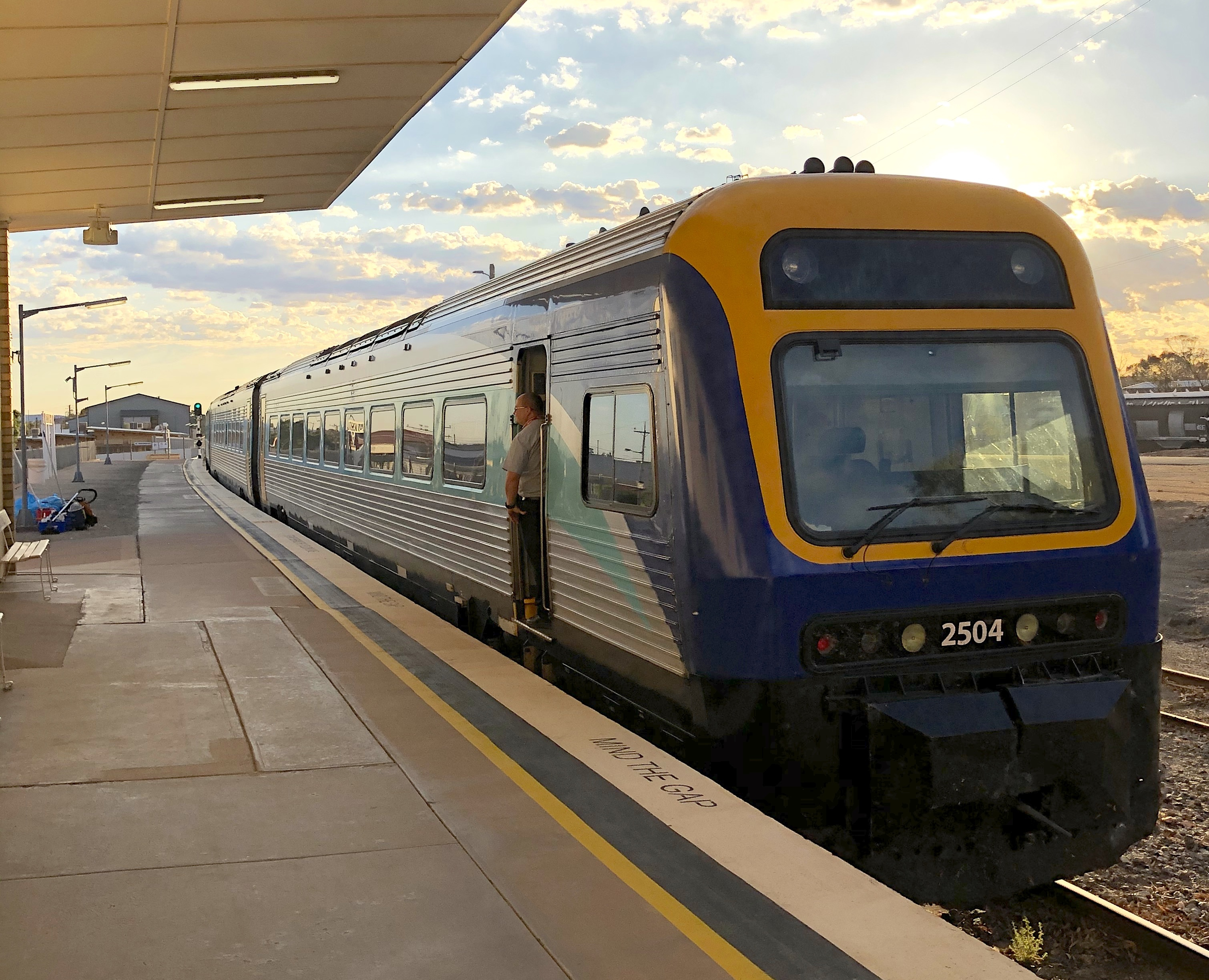
Outback Xplorer at Broken Hill

A section of the current main line from Sydney to Broken Hill, was built from Orange to Molong (1885), Parkes (1893), Condobolin (1898) and Trida (1919). A separate section of standard gauge line was also opened from Menindee to Broken Hill in 1919, which met the 1,067 mm (3 ft 6 in) gauge Silverton Tramway at a break-of-gauge opened in 1888.

At Cockburn, the Silverton Tramway connected with the South Australian Railways system to Port Pirie and via a break of gauge at Terowie to Adelaide. The final missing link between Trida and Broken Hill was completed in 1927. In 1969 the Broken Hill – Port Pirie was standardised, completing the Sydney – Perth standard gauge link.

=== South Coast line ===
The South Coast line was opened in stages progressively southward from Sydney starting in 1884 and reaching Wollongong in 1887 and Bomaderry, near Nowra in 1893. A branch line was built from Sydenham to Belmore in 1895, Bankstown in 1909 and Regents Park in 1928, which became part of the Bankstown Line of the Sydney Trains transport network.

=== Main North line ===
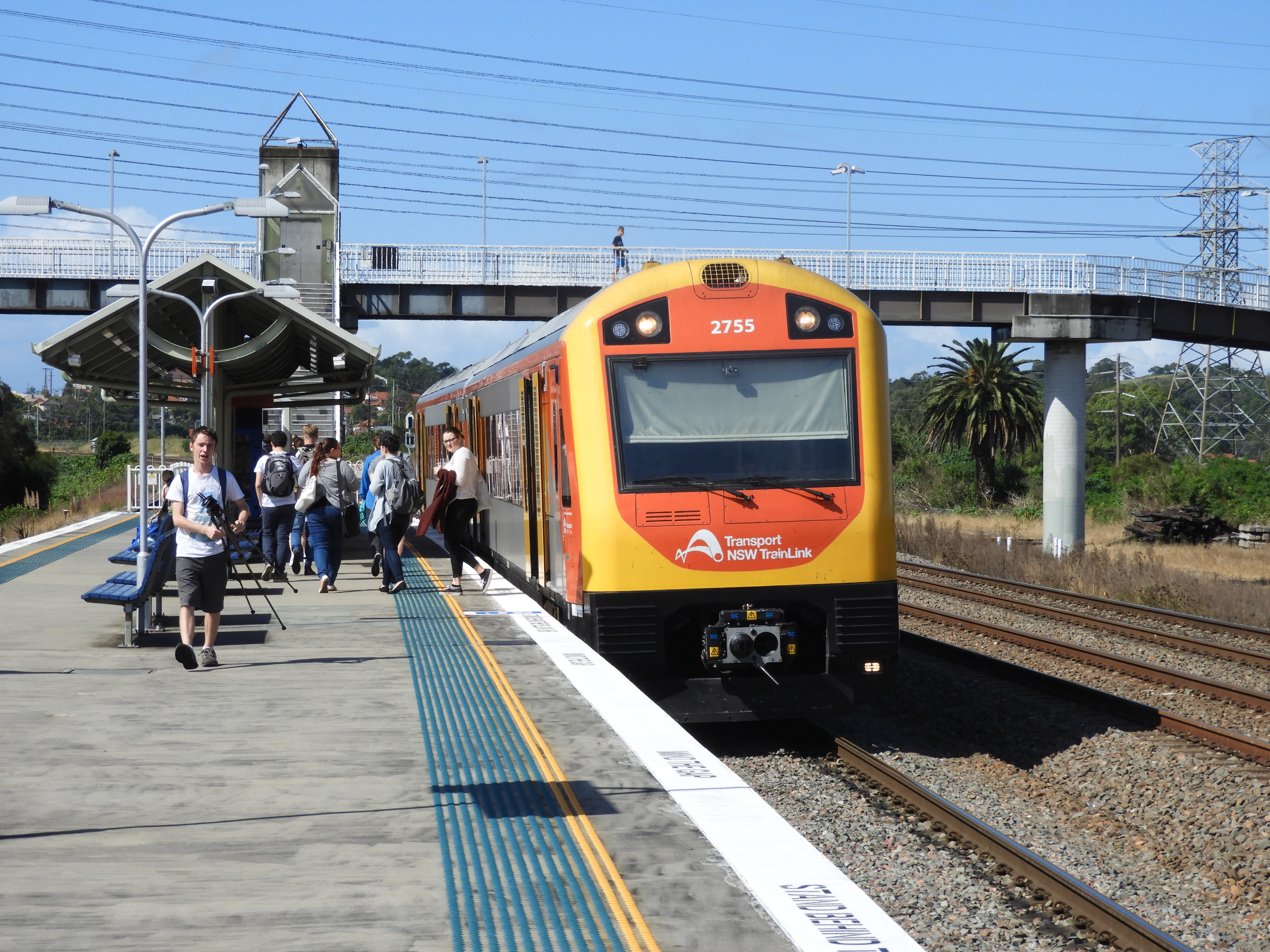
A Hunter railcar at Warabrook

The first section of the Main North line was built in the Hunter Valley by the New South Wales Government Railways in 1857. It was extended north to Wallangarra in various stages, reaching the Queensland border and connecting with Queensland Railway's Southern line to Brisbane at a break-of-gauge in 1888. The final section between Strathfield and Newcastle was completed by the opening of the Hawkesbury River railway bridge in 1889.

=== North Coast line ===
The North Coast railway line was built between 1905 and 1932, and when completed, bypassed the Main North line and provided a quicker route up the eastern seaboard. The first part of the North Coast line was built between Casino and Grafton in 1905, as an extension of a line from Murwillumbah. It was extended from Casino to Kyogle in 1910 and South Brisbane in 1930. The section from Maitland junction to South Grafton was opened progressively between 1911 and 1922. The Clarence River at Grafton was the most difficult river to cross, and was the last section to be opened in 1932, upon completion of the Grafton Bridge.

=== Light rail ===
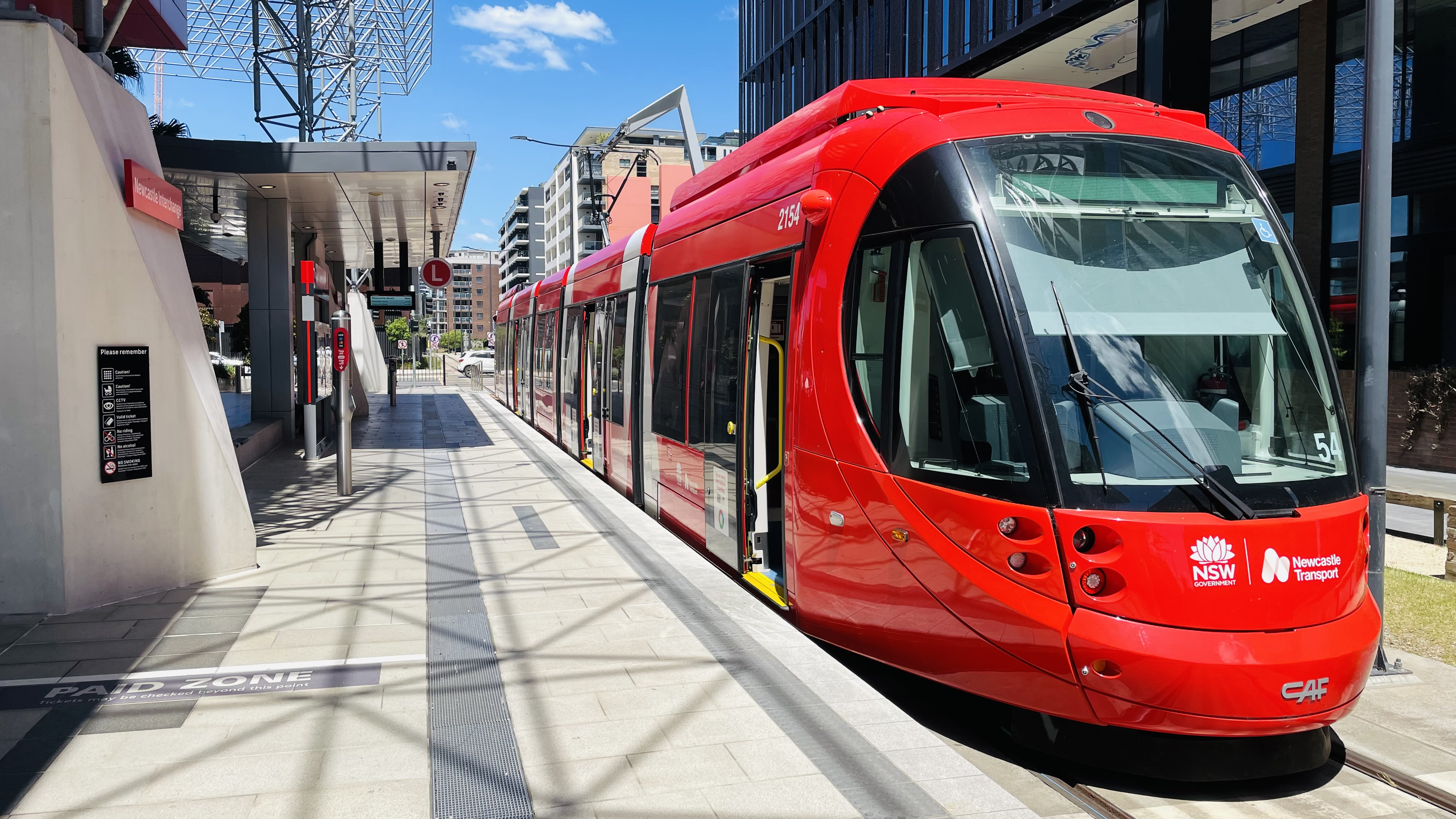
The Newcastle Light Rail at Newcastle Interchange

Light rail systems operate in Sydney and Newcastle. Some metropolitan heavy rail lines have been partially or substantially converted to light rail.

In Sydney, the Inner West Light Rail incorporates much of the former Rozelle–Darling Harbour Goods Line. Most of the Carlingford line and a portion the Sandown line, the latter leading to a depot, were incorporated into the Parramatta Light Rail. Meanwhile, the CBD and Southeast Light Rail was built anew, but much of its route mimics Sydney's historic tram network.

The Newcastle line was truncated and part of the corridor utilised by the Newcastle Light Rail.

The Royal National Park branch, a former heavy rail line running from Loftus into the Royal National Park, is now operated by the Sydney Tramway Museum.

== Private railways ==
A number of private lines were built to connect the South Maitland coalfields (discovered in 1886) with the Great Northern Railway at East Greta Junction near Maitland. By 1918 most of these had been merged into the South Maitland Railway.

A narrow gauge railway was built by South Australian Railways from Port Pirie to Broken Hill, in 1888 to serve its silver and lead mine, which was becoming the largest and richest of its kind in the world. Since the New South Wales Government would not allow the South Australia Railways to cross the border, the last 30 km (19 mi) was built by a private company as a tramway, the Silverton Tramway from Cockburn to Broken Hill. In 1970 the line was replaced by a standard gauge South Australia government line, completing the standard transcontinental gauge line from Sydney to Perth.

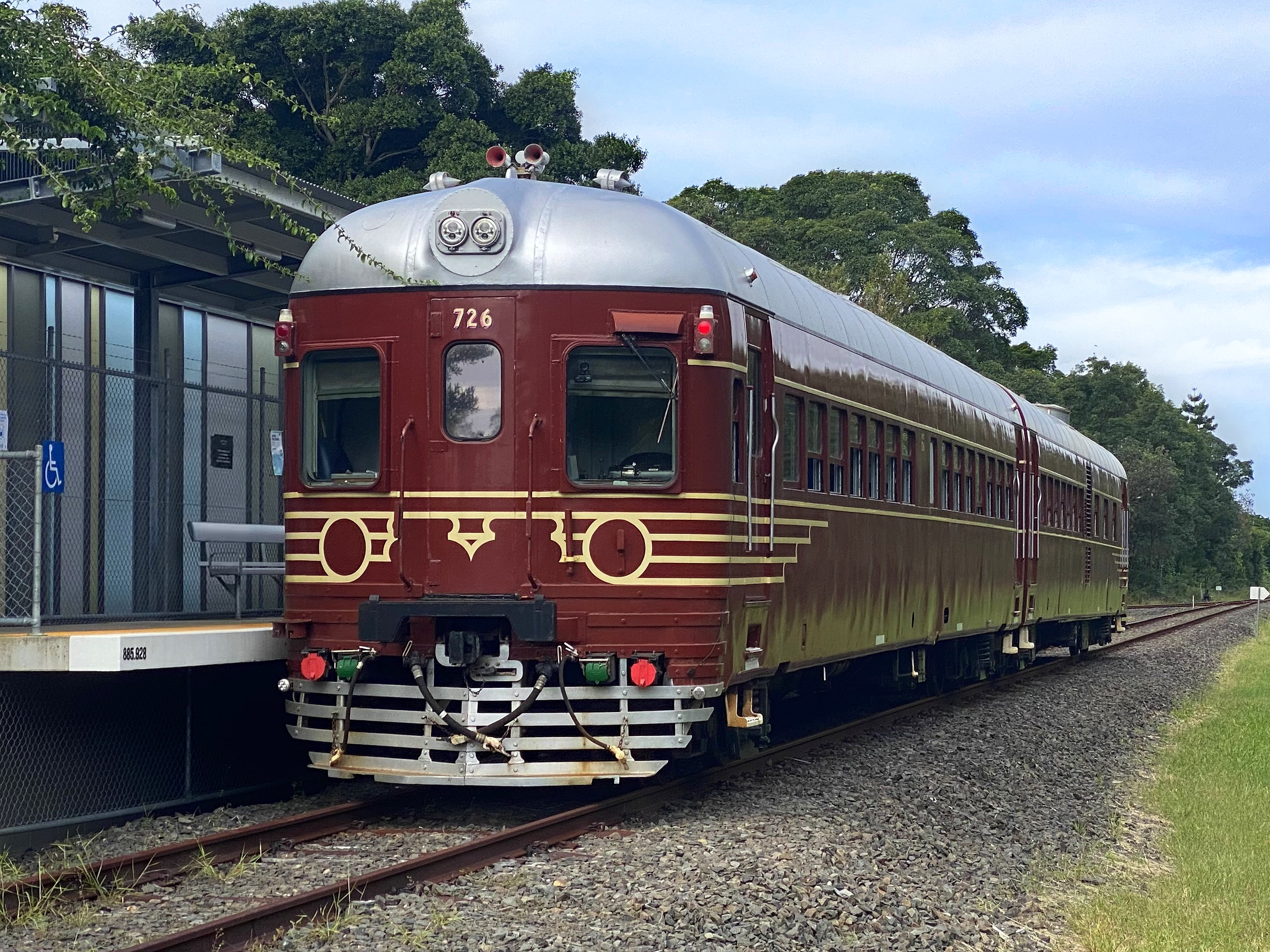
Byron Bay Train

The Byron Bay Train is a passenger service in Byron Bay using a 620 class railcar converted for solar operation. It runs along a stretch of the Murwillumbah line.

A number of other private railways have been built in New South Wales to serve coal mines, steel works, notably the Port Kembla steel works, formerly operated by BHP (now BlueScope) and quarries, especially in the first half of the 20th century.

Though the networks are publicly owned, operation of services on light rail networks and Sydney Metro is contracted to private companies.

== Lines originating in adjacent states ==
Lines of different gauges have extended short distances into New South Wales from three adjacent states, including:

- the 1067 mm (3 ft 6 in) gauge Silverton Tramway from the South Australian border to Broken Hill, 1888 to 1970
- Queensland Railways' 1067 mm (3 ft 6 in) gauge South Coast line from Queensland to Tweed Heads, 1903 to 1961
- several hundred metres of 1067 mm (3 ft 6 in) gauge from the break-of-gauge station at Wallangarra, Queensland into yards in Jennings, NSW, which remains in place
- two 1600 mm (5 ft 3 in) lines from Victoria, as follows. The Tocumwal and Deniliquin lines are the only 2 Broad Gauge lines that cross the Murray River into New South Wales.

The Deniliquin line was the first 5 ft 3 in (1,600 mm) gauge line to be extended into the state. Permission was granted to the Deniliquin & Moama Railway Company by the New South Wales Government in 1874 to construct a line 72-kilometre (45 mi) long line from Moama to Deniliquin, connecting with the Victorian Railways system at the Murray Bridge, near Echuca and the line was opened in 1876. This was followed in 1906 when an agreement was made between both states for the Victorian Railways Tocumwal line to be extended north into Tocumwal. Opened in 1908, both states shared construction costs for the line but the profit (or loss) would be Victoria's.

The final stage was in 1917 when the Border Railway Commission (made up be representatives of both states) recommended favourably on the construction of four additional Victorian lines into New South Wales, culminating in the 1922 Border Railways Acts of both states. The Deniliquin & Moama Railway Company was taken in 1923 at a cost of £165,000. New construction included the Balranald, Oaklands, Stony Crossing, and Lette lines. Only the Deniliquin and Oaklands lines are still open for traffic. Balranald was closed in stages from 1986 to 2008. Stony Crossing line was closed beyond the Victorian border in 1943. The Lette line was never opened. Construction, which began in 1926, reached Koorakee before further work was abandoned in 1943.

== See also ==
- History of rail transport in Australia
- John Whitton (1820–1898), the engineer-in-charge for the New South Wales Government Railways, serving between 1856 and 1899, considered the father of New South Wales Railways
- Rail transport in Australia
- Railway accidents in New South Wales
