= Darnick railway station =

Railway station in New South Wales, Australia

Darnick
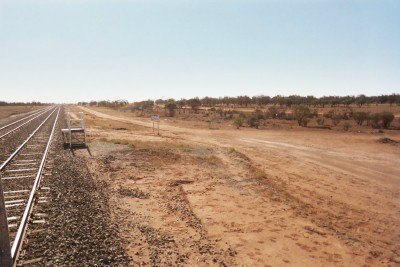
- The small platform next to the track in 2006.

General information
- Location: Ivanhoe-Menindee Road, Darnick; Australia
- Coordinates: 32°51′04″S 143°37′30″E
- Owner: Transport Asset Manager of New South Wales
- Operator: NSW TrainLink
- Line: Broken Hill
- Distance: 881.04 kilometres (547.45 mi) from Central
- Platforms: 1
- Tracks: 2

Construction
- Structure type: Ground

Other information
- Station code: DNK

History
- Opened: 7 November 1927

Services
Preceding station	NSW TrainLink	Following station
Menindee towards Broken Hill	NSW TrainLink Western Line Broken Hill Outback Xplorer	Ivanhoe towards Sydney
Former services
Preceding station	Former services	Following station
Manara towards Broken Hill	Broken Hill Line	Beilpajah towards Orange
Location

Darnick railway station is a very small train station located on the Broken Hill line in New South Wales, Australia. The station's platform is only long enough to facilitate one Xplorer train door, and is only serviced by the weekly Outback Xplorer.

== History ==
Darnick station opened on 7 November 1927 when the Broken Hill line was extended from Condobolin to Trida.

Originally, Darnick station had a full-sized platform.

== Services ==
Darnick is served by NSW TrainLink's weekly Outback Xplorer between Sydney and Broken Hill. This station is a request stop, so the train only stops here if passengers have booked to board or alight here. Journey Beyond's weekly Indian Pacific also passes through here; however, it does not stop.

Platform	Line	Stopping pattern	Notes
1	Western Region	services to Sydney and Broken Hill	request stop (booked passengers only)

== Description ==
The train station is not staffed, being unattended throughout every week. The station is along the dirt Ivanhoe-Menindee Road and the station is not accessible for disabled people.

According to the Transport for NSW website, there is wheelchair ramp boarding assistance and stairs at the station.
