= Euabalong West railway station =

Railway station in New South Wales, Australia

Euabalong West
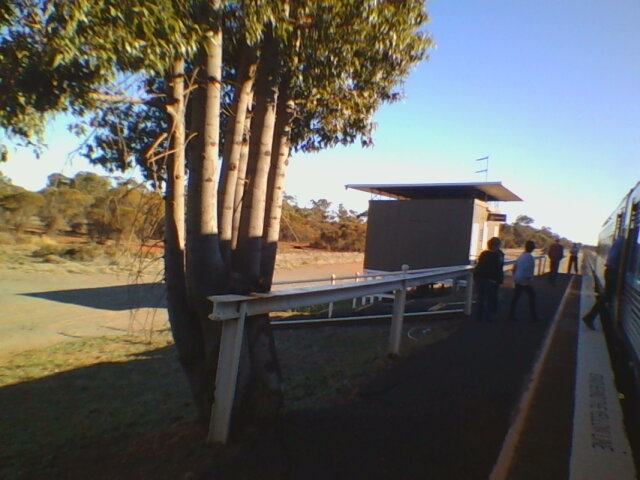
- The platform at Euabalong West with a train to Broken Hill in view

General information
- Location: Uabba Street, Euabalong West
- Coordinates: 33°03′17″S 146°23′35″E
- Owner: Transport Asset Manager of New South Wales
- Operator: NSW TrainLink
- Line: Broken Hill
- Distance: 619.2 km (384.8 mi) from Central
- Platforms: 1
- Tracks: 2

Construction
- Structure type: Ground

Other information
- Station code: EUB

History
- Opened: 10 February 1919

Services
Preceding station	NSW TrainLink	Following station
Ivanhoe towards Broken Hill	NSW TrainLink Western Line Broken Hill Outback Xplorer	Condobolin towards Sydney
Location
- Location within New South Wales

Euabalong West railway station is located on the Broken Hill line in New South Wales, Australia. It serves the town of Euabalong West.

== History ==
Euabalong station opened on 10 February 1919 when the Broken Hill line was extended from Condobolin to Trida.

== Services ==
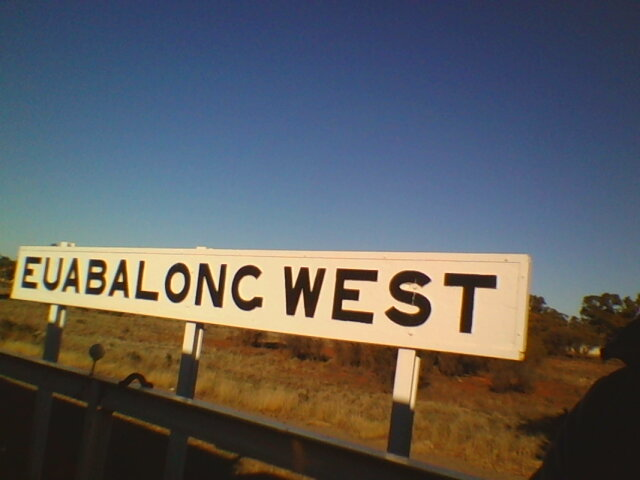
Euabalong West station sign viewed from within a Broken Hill-bound train.

Euabalong West is served by NSW TrainLink's weekly Outback Xplorer between Sydney and Broken Hill. It is also served by NSW TrainLink road coach services from Condobolin to Cootamundra.

Journey Beyond's weekly Indian Pacific passes Euabalong West but does not stop at the station.

Platform	Line	Stopping pattern	Notes
1	Western Region	services to Sydney Central & Broken Hill	
