= Ivanhoe railway station, New South Wales =

Railway station in New South Wales, Australia

Ivanhoe
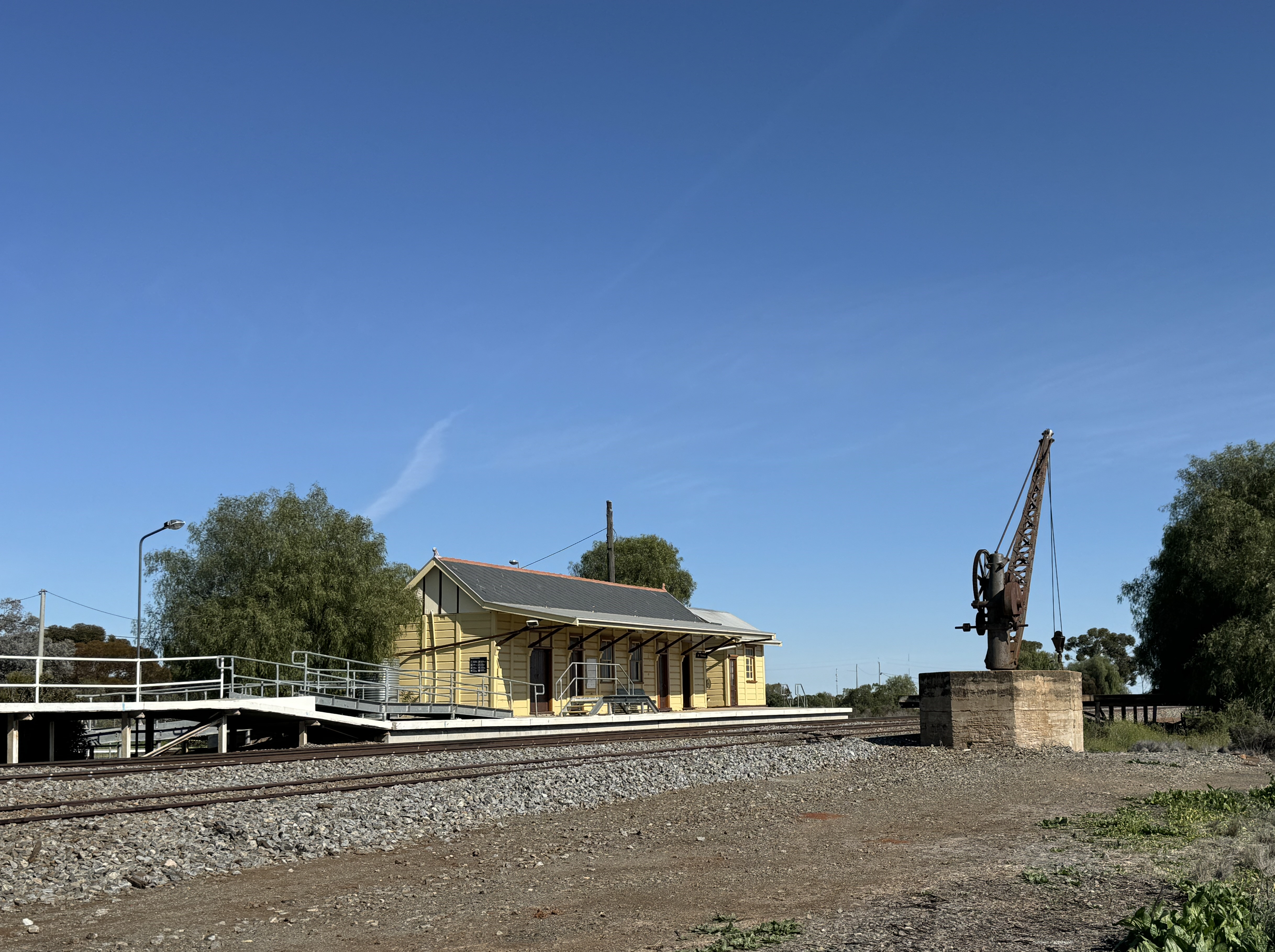
- Westbound view in August 2024

General information
- Location: Mitchell Street, Ivanhoe
- Coordinates: 32°54′51″S 144°18′42″E
- Owner: Transport Asset Manager of New South Wales
- Operator: NSW TrainLink
- Line: Broken Hill
- Distance: 816.40 km (507.29 mi) kilometres from Central
- Platforms: 1
- Tracks: 3

Construction
- Structure type: Ground
- Accessible: Yes

Other information
- Station code: IVN

History
- Opened: 19 August 1925

Services
Preceding station	NSW TrainLink	Following station
Darnick towards Broken Hill	NSW TrainLink Western Line Broken Hill Outback Xplorer	Euabalong West towards Sydney
Location

Ivanhoe railway station is located on the Broken Hill line in New South Wales, Australia. It serves the town of Ivanhoe.

== History ==
Ivanhoe station opened on 19 August 1925 when the line was extended from Trida. It served as the terminus of the line until 7 November 1927 when it was extended to join with the line from Broken Hill.

The main town is located approximately three kilometres north of the station and from the original opening of the line a separate railway town was constructed adjacent the station to service the railways needs. Workshops, worker houses, locomotive depots, track maintenance depot, crew barracks, fuelling point and the station were all built. The railway town has now largely been taken over by the Ivanhoe Gaol.

== Services ==
Ivanhoe is served by NSW TrainLink's weekly Outback Xplorer between Sydney and Broken Hill.

Journey Beyond's weekly Indian Pacific passes Ivanhoe but does not stop at the station.

Platform	Line	Stopping pattern	Notes
1	Western Region	services to Sydney Central & Broken Hill	
