= Ootha =

- Town
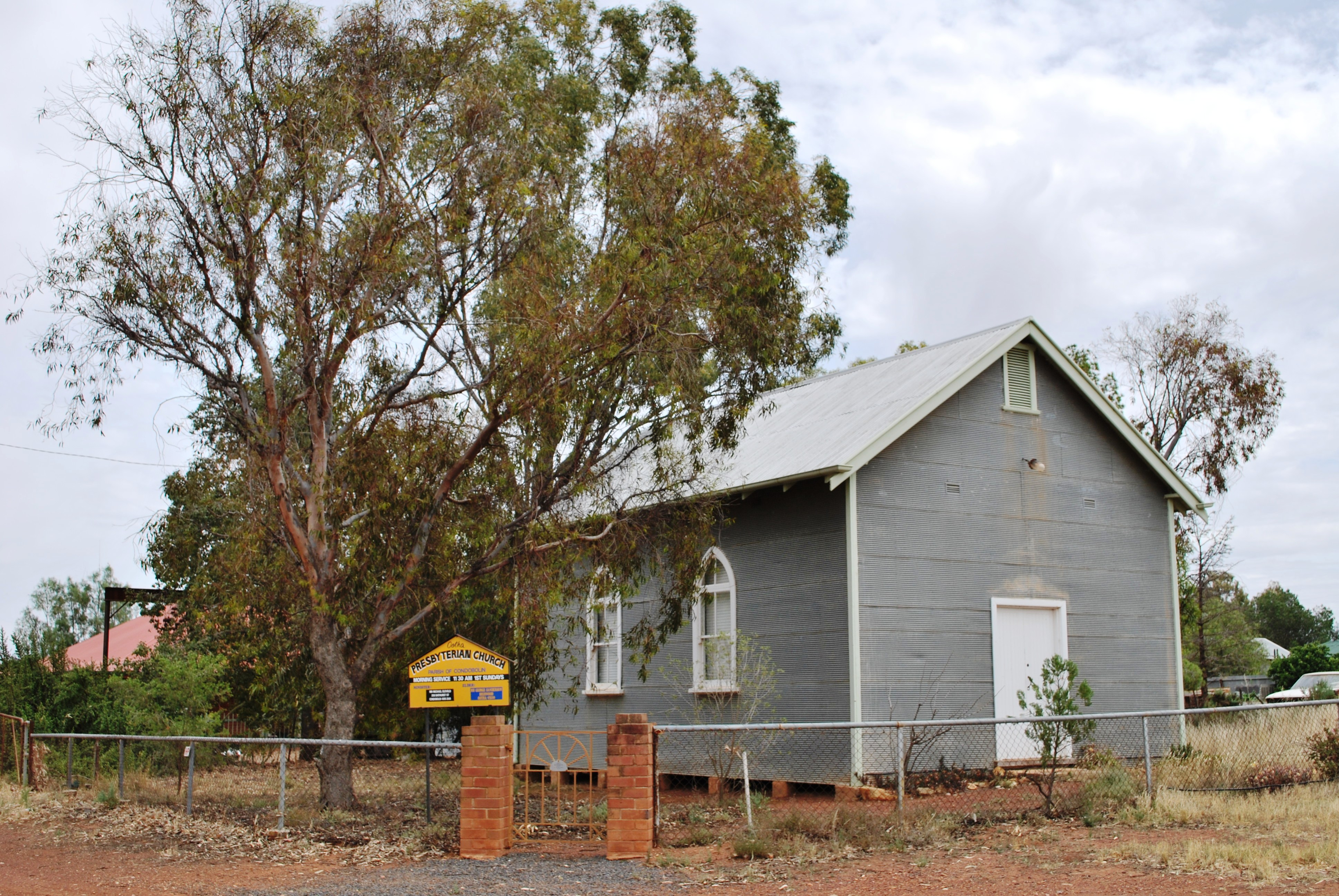
- Presbyterian church

- Coordinates: 33°07′0″S 147°27′0″E
- Country: Australia
- State: New South Wales
- LGA: Forbes Shire
- Location: 430 km (270 mi) W of Sydney; 73 km (45 mi) W of Parkes; 30 km (19 mi) E of Condobolin

Government
  - State electorate: Dubbo
  - Federal division: Calare

Population
  - Total: 94 (2006 census)
- Postcode: 2875

Ootha is a village in the Central West region of New South Wales, Australia. The village is in the Forbes Shire local government area, 430 kilometres (270 mi) west of the state capital, Sydney. At the 2006 census, Ootha and the surrounding area had a population of 94. The place name is derived from an aboriginal word for 'ear'. Ootha is situated approximately 10 km from Mount Derriwong, which is recognised by surveyors as sporting the central Trig Station for NSW.

== History ==
Ootha Post Office opened on 15 December 1914 and closed in 1980. The primary school opened in 1933 and drew attendances from single digit numbers to the high twenties over the course of its life. The school was a single-teacher school throughout its life. One of those teachers was Eric Woodward, who went on to become the Minister for Education in the NSW government. Many of the pupils who passed through the school were the children of a transient fettler population whose main purpose was the maintenance of the railway line.

The general store was taken over by Jonnie and Isabelle Hamer, who purchased the store from Clarrie Buckland in 1951. Jonnie died after three days of taking possession of the store and Jack Hamer and his wife and Molly came from Sydney to give his mother a hand and ultimately stayed on until 1975 when the store was subject to a fire that razed it to the ground. The goodwill for the business was purchased soon after by Barry Yetman from nearby Yarrabandai and he set up shop in the disused Ootha Motors premises.

In the 1950s and 60s the village prospered from the surrounding farming community with both the garage (Ootha Motors) and the General store drawing customers from a thirty to forty mile radius. The town had a cricket team and a tennis team, both of which were competitive in local district competitions. Competition from both Condobolin and ultimately Parkes and Forbes put paid to the viability of the Ootha businesses after the roads to Condobolin and then to Parkes were tarred, thus making it much easier for residents to shop in the larger towns. Large farming properties such as Burrawang West and Melgutherie were well known properties through the NSW farming. The garage met its demise with the passing of Roy Harvey, but mechanical repairs were offered by Alan Ross who opened a new garage soon after. During those years, much of the town and surrounding population were made up of people of the Plymouth Brethren faith and they had a meeting hall within the village which has subsequently been sold as a residence. The village also sported a Presbyterian church which still stands.

The railway was part of the Sydney to Broken Hill line. The Silver City Comet was a train service that operated from September 1937 until November 1989 between Parkes and Broken Hill. In 1970, the first run of the Indian Pacific between Sydney and Perth was completed, but not until after the railway siding having to be moved after one of the carriages collected the siding in the trial stage. Apart from the passenger services (including a daily Rail Motor service between Condobolin and Parkes) the rail provided for substantial freight movements west of Parkes. In particular, the movement of wheat from the silos situated on the western fringe of the village was substantial and each year saw wheat trucks lined up for up to one kilometre whilst waiting to dump their load. Shopkeeper and Stock and station agent Jack Hamer eased that issue by bringing the concept of mesh bins to farmers in the district in the early 1960s. This allowed farmers to temporarily store their wheat on their farms pending movement to the silos in a more orderly fashion.

Burrawang West was purchased by a Japanese consortium for the purpose of a "resort" to bring foreign visitors to the western districts of NSW. The resort has passed through a number of hands and has now reverted to a fully functioning farming property and is home to the Burrawang White Dorper Stud. The property also runs fat lambs and has retained the residential site as a private retreat which caters for leisure and business groups. Access roads from Ootha to Burrawang West also provide for an unusual tourist phenomenon locally known as the Utes in the Paddock" (http://www.visitnsw.com/destinations/country-nsw/parkes-area/condobolin/attractions/utes-in-the-paddock) . The village has suffered the small town symptoms that have been the bugbear of many similar villages in NSW and is now a minor residential dormitory in the centre of NSW and has no retail or other services available to its residents.
