= Horse Lake railway station =

Former railway station in New South Wales, Australia

Coordinates: 32.1321°S 142.0976°E

Horse Lake

General information
- Location: Australia
- Line: Broken Hill railway line, New South Wales

History
- Opened: 1923
- Closed: 1974

Services
| Preceding station | Former services | Following station |
|---|---|---|
| Kinalung towards Broken Hill | Broken Hill Line | Box Tank towards Orange |
Location
- Location within New South Wales Location within Australia

Horse Lake is a closed railway station on the Broken Hill railway line in New South Wales, Australia. The station opened in 1923 and closed in 1974.

The railway was also the filming location for the fictional “Tiboonda” township in the 1971 psychological thriller Wake In Fright, based on the Kenneth Cook novel by the same name.
