= Condobolin railway station =

Railway station in New South Wales, Australia

Condobolin
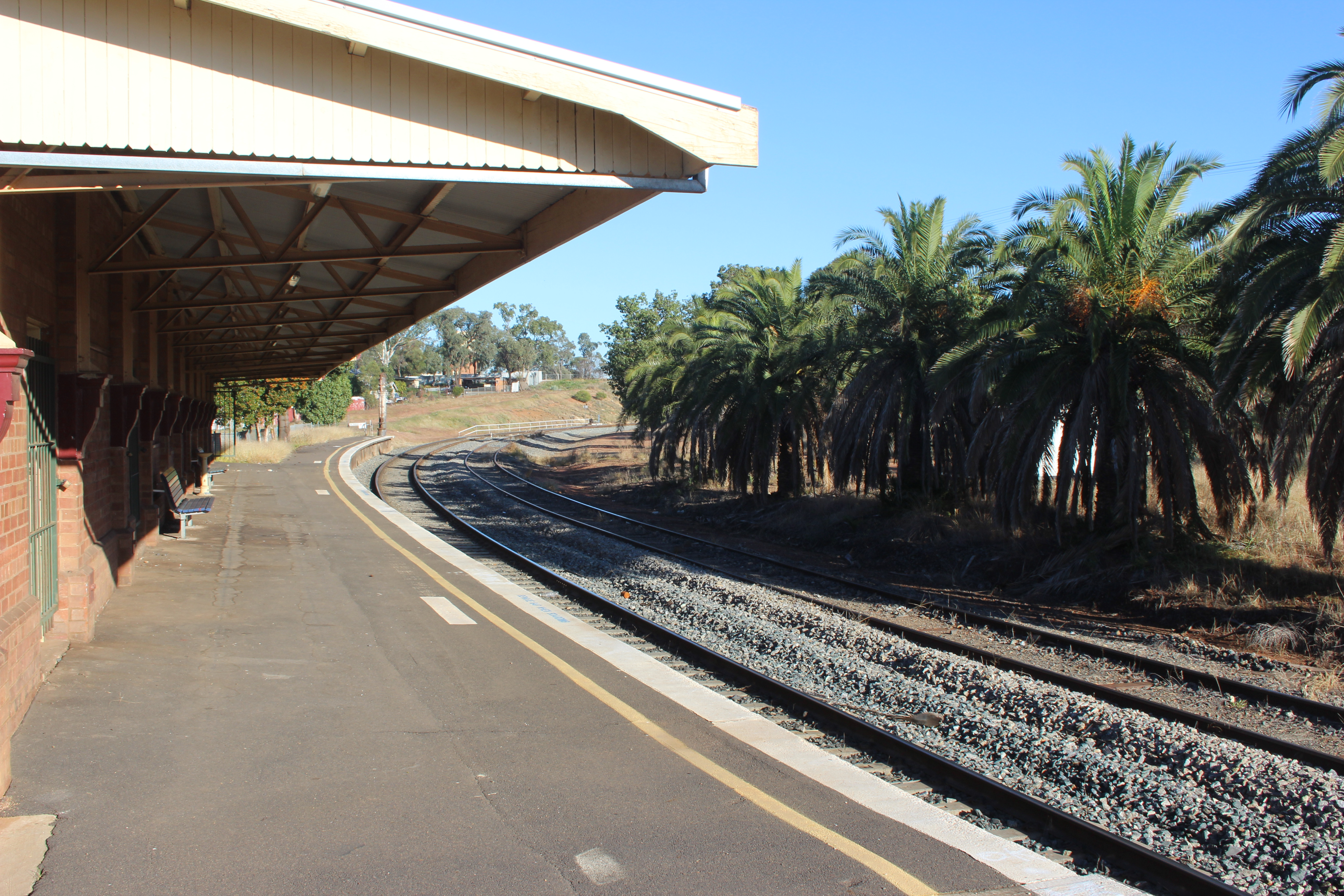
- Eastbound view in May 2014

General information
- Location: Station Street, Condobolin; Australia
- Coordinates: 33°05′03″S 147°09′11″E
- Owner: Transport Asset Manager of New South Wales
- Operator: NSW TrainLink
- Line: Broken Hill
- Distance: 546.30 kilometres (339.46 mi) from Central
- Platforms: 1
- Tracks: 2

Construction
- Structure type: Ground
- Accessible: Yes

Other information
- Station code: CBX

History
- Opened: 1 March 1898

Services
| Preceding station | NSW TrainLink | Following station |
|---|---|---|
| Euabalong West towards Broken Hill | NSW TrainLink Western Line Broken Hill Outback Xplorer | Parkes towards Sydney |
Location

Condobolin railway station is located on the Broken Hill line in New South Wales, Australia. It serves the town of Condobolin.

== History ==
Condobolin station opened on 18 December 1893. It served as the terminus of the Broken Hill line until it was extended to Trida in 1919. The present station building was erected in 1935.

== Services ==
Condobolin is served by NSW TrainLink's weekly Outback Xplorer between Sydney and Broken Hill. NSW TrainLink also operate road coach services to Parkes and Cootamundra.

Great Southern Rail's weekly Indian Pacific passes Condobolin but does not stop at the station.

| Platform | Line | Stopping pattern | Notes |
| 1 | Western Region | services to Sydney Central & Broken Hill | |
