= Transcontinental rail corridors =

Transcontinental rail corridors may refer to:

- Sydney–Perth rail corridor, the East–west rail corridor in Australia
- Adelaide–Darwin railway line, the North–south rail corridor in Australia
