= Federal City Express =

Former passenger railway service between Sydney and Canberra in Australia

Overview
- Service type: Passenger train
- Status: Ceased
- First service: 27 September 1936
- Last service: 8 May 1955
- Successor: Canberra Monaro Express
- Former operator: New South Wales Government Railways

Route
- Termini: Sydney; Canberra
- Distance travelled: 330 kilometres (210 mi)
- Service frequency: Once daily in each direction
- Lines used: Main South; Bombala

The Federal City Express was an Australian passenger train operated by New South Wales Government Railways between Sydney and Canberra from September 1936 until May 1955.

Initially hauled by steam locomotives, the Monday to Thursday service was taken over by Silver City Comet rolling stock from October 1939 for a few years when increasing demand necessitated it be steam hauled again.

It was replaced in May 1955 by the Canberra Monaro Express.
