= Menindee railway station =

Railway station in New South Wales, Australia

Menindee
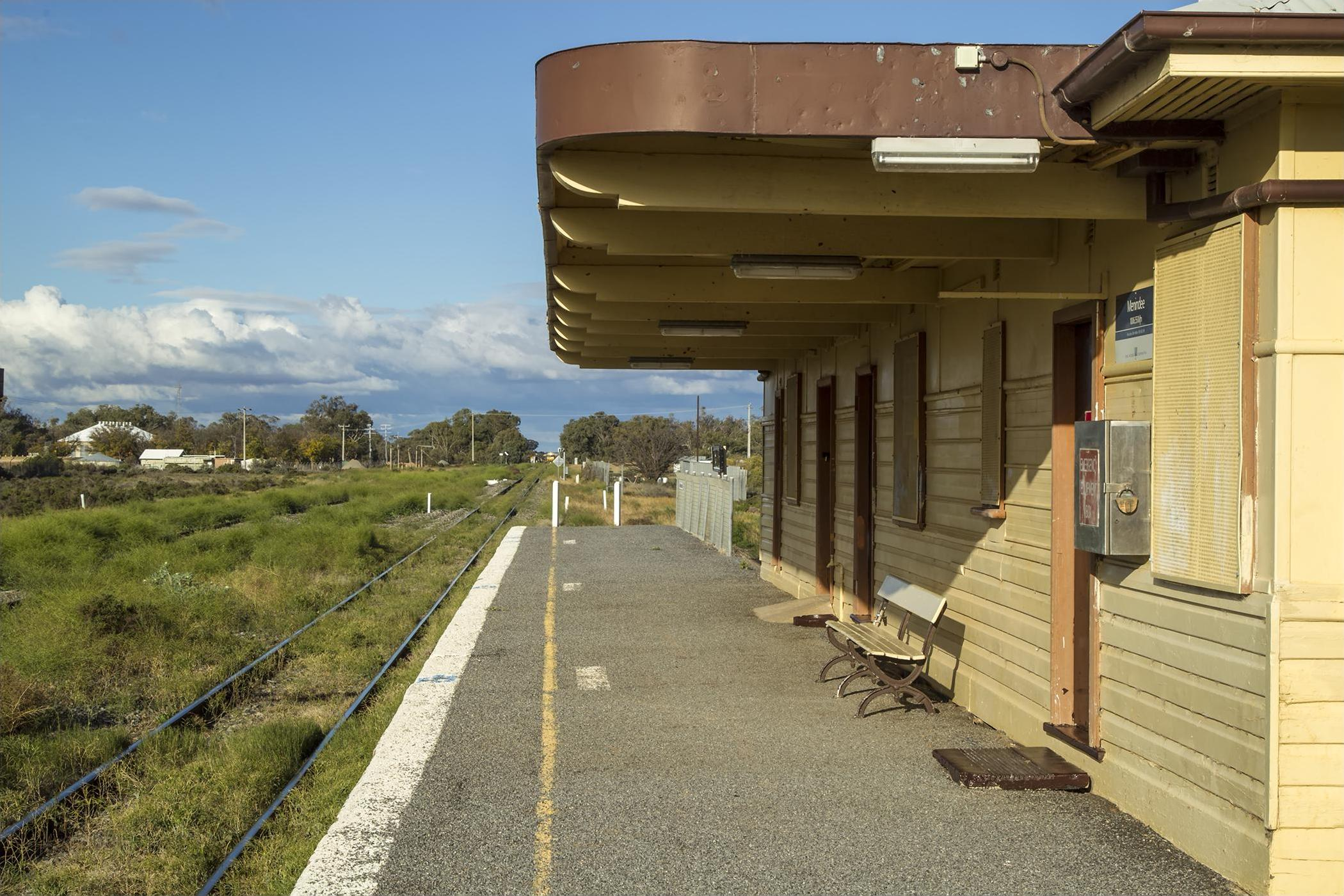

General information
- Location: Malden Street, Menindee; Australia
- Coordinates: 32°23′19″S 142°25′34″E
- Owner: Transport Asset Manager of New South Wales
- Operator: NSW TrainLink
- Line: Broken Hill
- Distance: 1,006.60 kilometres (625.47 mi) from Central
- Platforms: 1
- Tracks: 3

Construction
- Structure type: Ground

Other information
- Station code: MND

History
- Opened: 15 July 1919

Passengers
- 476 (2023)

Services
Preceding station	NSW TrainLink	Following station
Broken Hill Terminus	NSW TrainLink Western Line Broken Hill Outback Xplorer	Darnick towards Sydney
Former services
Preceding station	Former services	Following station
Box Tank towards Broken Hill	Broken Hill Line	Kaleentha towards Orange
Location

Menindee railway station is located on the Broken Hill line in New South Wales, Australia. It serves the town of Menindee.

== History ==
Menindee station opened on 15 July 1919 when the line opened from Broken Hill. It served as the terminus until the line was extended east in November 1927 to connect with the line from Sydney. Until this point, the line was isolated from the rest of the New South Wales Government Railways network.

== Services ==
Menindee is served by NSW TrainLink's weekly Outback Xplorer between Sydney and Broken Hill.

Journey Beyond's weekly Indian Pacific service passes Menindee but does not stop at the station.

Platform	Line	Stopping pattern	Notes
1	Western Region	services to Sydney Central & Broken Hill	
