= Silver City Comet =

Former passenger railway service in New South Wales

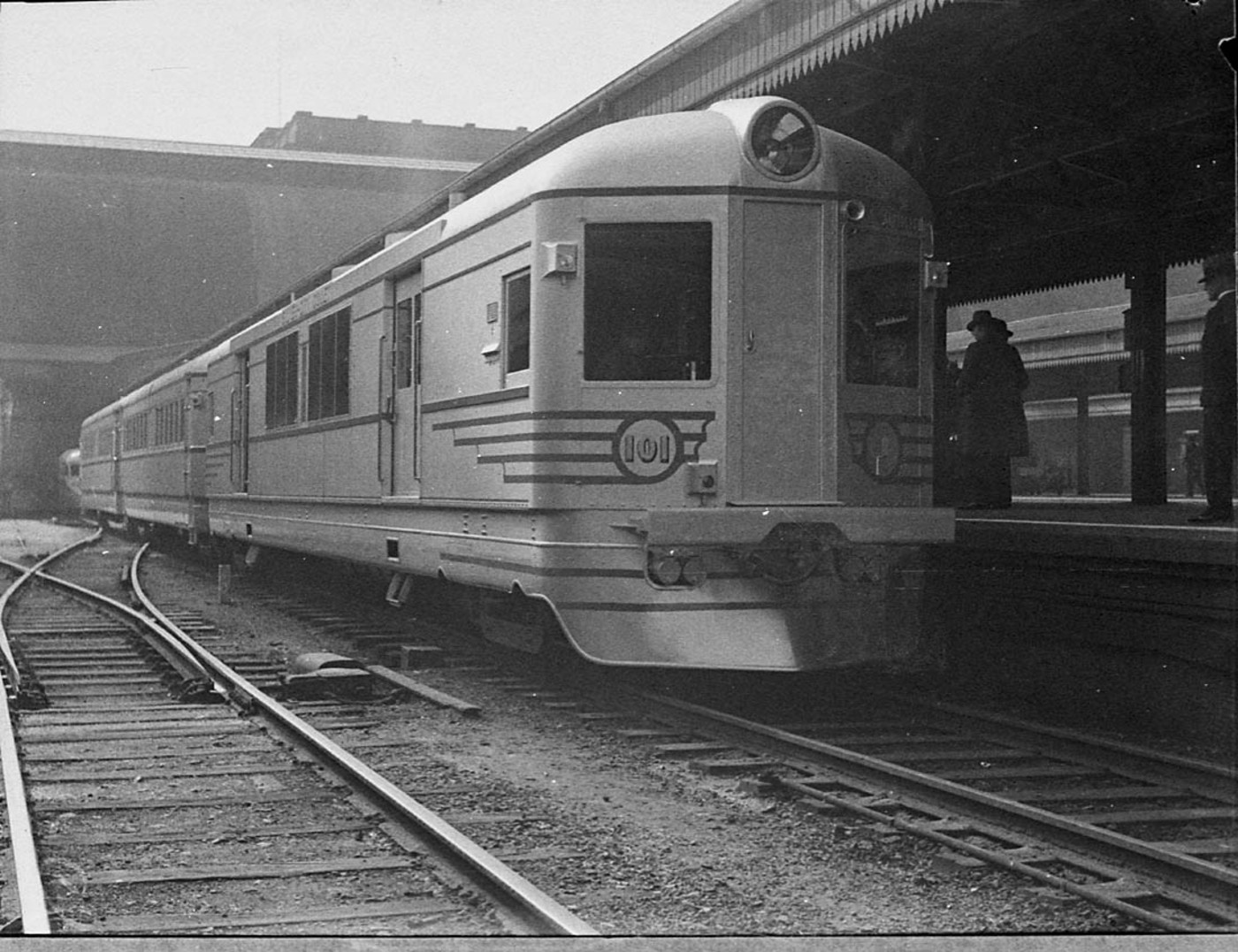
- Power van PH 101 at Sydney Central on a test run to Moss Vale in 1937

Overview
- Service type: Passenger train
- Status: Ceased
- First service: 27 September 1937
- Last service: 3 November 1989
- Former operator: State Rail Authority

Route
- Termini: Parkes; Broken Hill
- Distance travelled: 920 km (570 mi)
- Lines used: Main Western; Broken Hill

The Silver City Comet was a train service that operated from September 1937 until November 1989 between Parkes and Broken Hill in western New South Wales. It was the first air-conditioned train in Australia.

== Design ==
The original engines were built in Belfast by Harland & Wolff under licence from Burmeister & Wain known as the "Harlandic" type. An eight cylinder in line uniflow two-stroke engines with blower scavenging which developed 330 bhp (250 kW) at 1200 rpm. The transmission was a Voith-Sinclair torque converter design with two final drive gear ratios, geared for 130 km/h (81 mph) or 115 km/h (71 mph). Two "National" 22 kW (30 hp) diesel generator sets producing DC power for train lighting and air conditioning.

In 1953, spare parts supply difficulties and engine age prompted the NSWGR to re-engine the fleet with four 6–110 GM diesel engines rated at 250 bhp (190 kW) at 1800 rpm coupled in pairs driving Allison torque converters to the inner axle of each bogie. These are coupled in pairs through a GM Model TCLA 965 torque converter to gear boxes connected to each of the bogies. A Standard Waygood GM 120 volt, 50 kW (67 hp), generator set for power requirements including train lighting, cooking and air conditioning. The power van was re-classed 'DP', tare weight was 63 long tons (64 t; 71 short tons).

== Service ==
Broken Hill had a rail connection in 1887 to the South Australian Railways system at Cockburn (SA side) and Burns (NSW side) on the NSW/SA border. This line was narrow gauge and owned by the Silverton Tramway Company. Broken Hill itself had a standard gauge street steam tramway system (1902-1926). A tentative start was made toward Sydney with a standard gauge railway line to the Darling River at Menindee (1919), due to a critical water shortage in Broken Hill, with water trains bringing water to the city. The missing link was completed in 1927, with through running possible to Sydney. The redundant street trams were sent back to Sydney along the newly opened line.

When the rolling stock was ordered, it was planned that they would be utilised on both the Parkes to Broken Hill and Dubbo to Bourke services. In September 1937, the Silver City Comet commenced operating three times a week between Parkes and Broken Hill connecting with the Western Mail from Sydney. This was increased to daily from May 1938 before reverting to thrice weekly in October 1939. This released some stock for transfer to Sydney to operate Federal City Express services to Canberra from October 1939 until November 1945. In April 1940, the remaining stock was also transferred to Sydney to operate Newcastle Flyer services for a few months.

From January 1957, Silver City Comet stock operated a three times per week service from Parkes to Orange and Dubbo. Following the introduction of the Central West XPT service to Dubbo, in April 1982 this was cut back to Orange, but was extended to start at Forbes. By 1983, the Parkes - Forbes section was replaced by buses. By 1986, the Mail was withdrawn. The Silver City Comet was retimed to connect with Central West XPT, three days per week each way. The Orange - Forbes connection on the other four days was now by airconditioned bus.

== Rolling stock ==
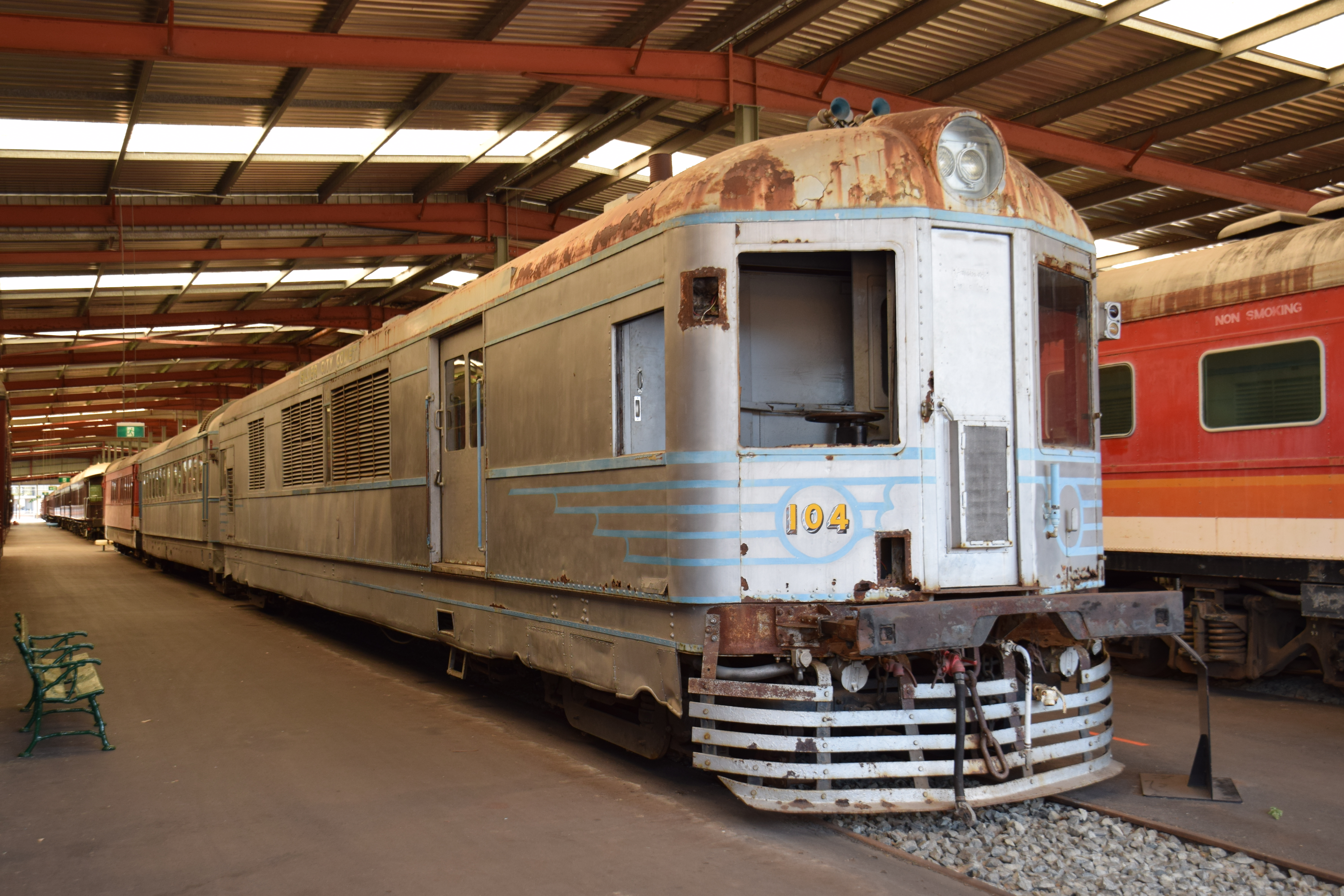
No.104 in silver livery at the New South Wales Railway Museum, Thirlmere

The New South Wales Government Railways placed orders for five diesel power vans with Eveleigh Carriage Workshops and 12 trailer cars with Ritchie Brothers, Auburn in the mid-1930s. The double ended power cars were each fitted with two Harland & Wolff Hardlandic diesel engines. PH 105 was destroyed by fire at Ivanhoe in January 1950 with the remaining four repowered with General Motors 6–110 engines between 1952 and 1957. DP 102 was withdrawn after being struck at a level crossing at Forbes in August 1982. The carriages were the first in Australia to feature air-conditioning.

Originally painted silver with blue lining, in the 1950s they were repainted in the standard tuscan and russet livery. By the 1970s they had returned to their original livery. In the 1980s they were repainted into the State Rail Authority's candy colours before once again being returned to their original livery in time for their 50th anniversary in 1987.

In its twilight years, the Silver City Comet became a popular train for enthusiast tours including operating to Melbourne (Vic.) in February 1983, up the North Coast line to Brisbane in April 1986 and the Main Northern line to Tenterfield in October 1989.

In September 1987, to celebrate the 50th anniversary of their entry into service, a set operated tours from Sydney to Canberra and Kiama.

== Trailer Cars ==
Along with the power cars, 12 air-conditioned passenger trailers were ordered from Ritchie Brothers of Auburn NSW. The trailers were built in three configurations – four First Class sitting cars (coded BT 201–204), four Second Class sitting cars with buffet (coded RFT 205–208) and four Second Class sitting cars (coded FT 209–212). Two additional parcel trailers (coded HT 301–302) were also constructed by NSWGR Carriage Works at Eveleigh, NSW.

The passenger trailers were each 55 feet long while the parcel trailers were 42 feet long. All cars featured a full-length side skirt below the floor level, partially covering the bogies and underfloor equipment. They were all painted in the same silver and blue livery as the power cars.

The trailers were constructed principally of aluminium alloy on a steel underframe. The cars were arranged internally with two saloons separated by male and female toilets. Entrance doors and vestibules were provided at each end.

The trailers were refurbished in the early 1950s to bring them up to the same standard as the new air-conditioned HUB and RUB daylight express carriages. The original First Class seating was retained and reclassified as Second Class, while new First Class seating was installed. Two buffet cars (DR 205 and 207) were also converted into full dining cars.

FT 212 was converted to a relief parcel trailer in 1953 and was condemned following a shunting accident in 1968. Following the demise of DEH 212 an Emergency Parcel Trailer (ETP 1475) was converted to operate with the Comet and renumbered EDH 320. This vehicle was condemned in 1981. To fulfil the luggage and parcel loading requirements on Comet services following the withdrawal of DH 301 and 302 and EDH 320, two surplus 500 Class trailer cars (HCT 504 and 508) were converted into Comet parcels trailers in 1985.

== Demise and Preservation ==
On 3 November 1989, the final Silver City Comet ran with road transport taking over the service.

Following their withdrawal in November 1989, the rolling stock was disposed of by auction at Parkes on 22 December 1989. The State Rail Authority donated a power van and four carriages to the City of Broken Hill that was placed on display at the Sulphide Street Railway Museum, and a carriage to the City of Parkes. The Dorrigo Steam Railway & Museum and New South Wales Rail Transport Museum (now the NSW Rail Museum) each purchased a power van and four carriages respectively. These latter two sets both moved to the Rail Motor Society, Paterson in April 1990. Dorrigo's stock was moved to Kooragang Island in May 1994 and subsequently to Dorrigo, while the Rail Transport Museum's stock moved to Thirlmere in April 1999.

== Power Car Roster ==
Power Vans
No	Entered service	Rebuild	Organisation	Location	Status
PH 101	September 1937	DP 101	Sulphide Street Railway & Historical Museum	Broken Hill	static exhibit
PH 102	August 1937	DP 102			condemned after accident August 1982, scrapped
PH 103	January 1938	DP 103	Dorrigo Steam Railway & Museum	Dorrigo	static exhibit
PH 104	May 1938	DP 104	NSW Rail Museum	Thirlmere	static exhibit
PH 105	September 1938				Destroyed by fire January 1950, scrapped

== Trailer Car Roster ==
Trailer Cars
No	Entered service	Rebuild	Organisation	Location	Status
BT 201	September 1937	DB 201	Dorrigo Steam Railway & Museum	Dorrigo	static exhibit
BT 202	September 1937	DC 202	Sulphide Street Railway & Historical Museum	Broken Hill	static exhibit
BT 203	January 1938	DC 203	Parkes City Council	Parkes	static exhibit
BT 204	September 1937	DF/DZF 204	Dorrigo Steam Railway & Museum	Dorrigo	static exhibit
RFT 205	September 1937	DR 205			scrapped
RFT 206	September 1937	DB 206	Dorrigo Steam Railway & Museum	Dorrigo	static exhibit
RFT 207	January 1938	DR 207	Sulphide Street Railway & Historical Museum	Broken Hill	static exhibit
RFT 208	September 1937	HFT 208	NSW Rail Museum	Thirlmere	static exhibit
FT 209	August 1941	HFT 209	Sulphide Street Railway & Historical Museum	Broken Hill	static exhibit
FT 210	October 1938	DB 210	NSW Rail Museum	Thirlmere	static exhibit
FT 211	May 1941	DF/DZF 211			scrapped
FT 212	July 1941	DEH 212			condemned after accident December 1968, scrapped
HT 301	September 1937	DH 301			condemned April 1983, scrapped
HT 302	March 1938	DH 302			condemned April 1983, scrapped
EDH 320	November 1970				condemned December 1981, scrapped
PT 504	September 1985		Sulphide Street Railway & Historical Museum	Broken Hill	static exhibit
PT 508	September 1985		Dorrigo Steam Railway & Museum	Dorrigo	static exhibit

== Gallery ==
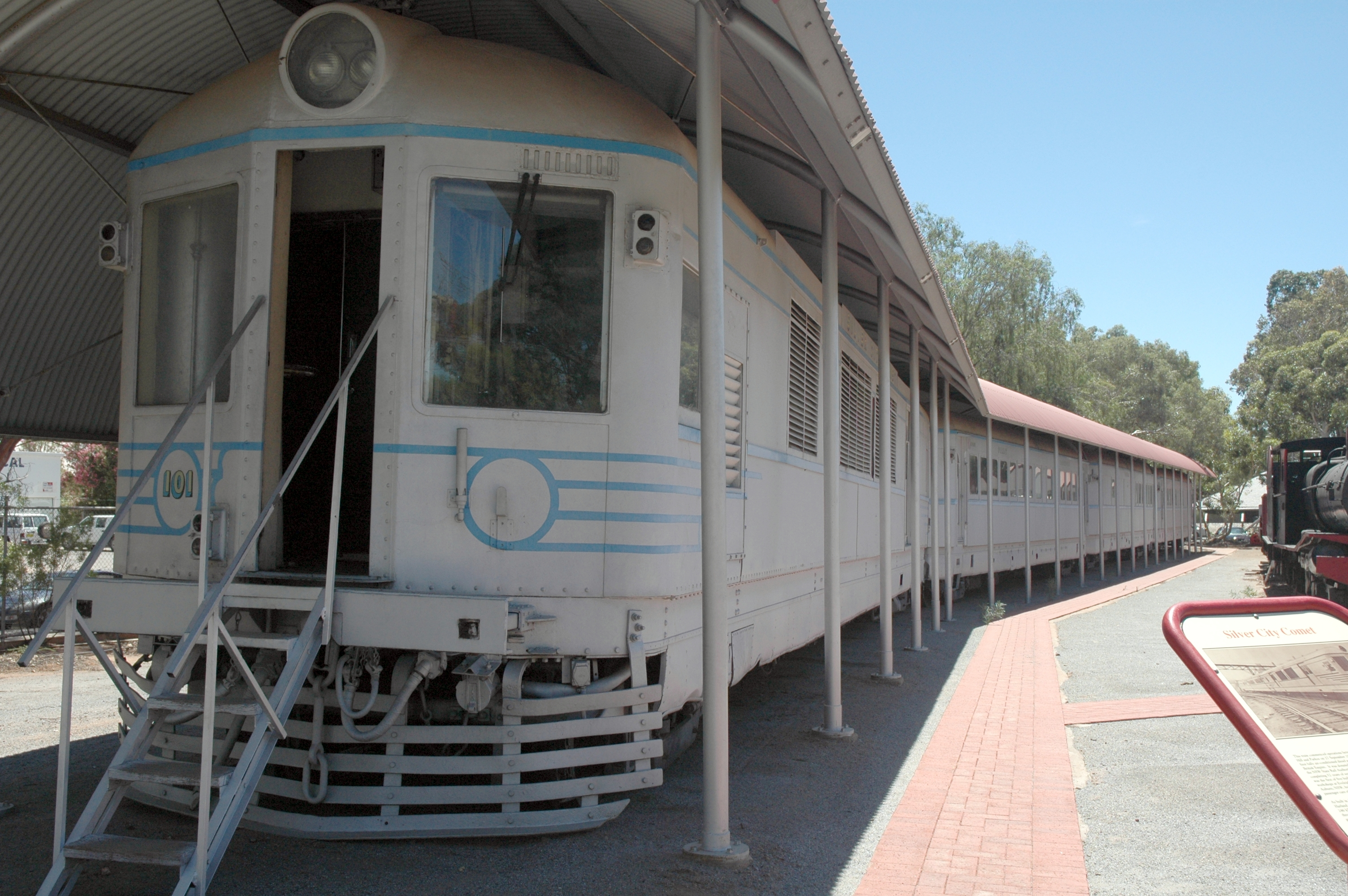
Power van DP 101

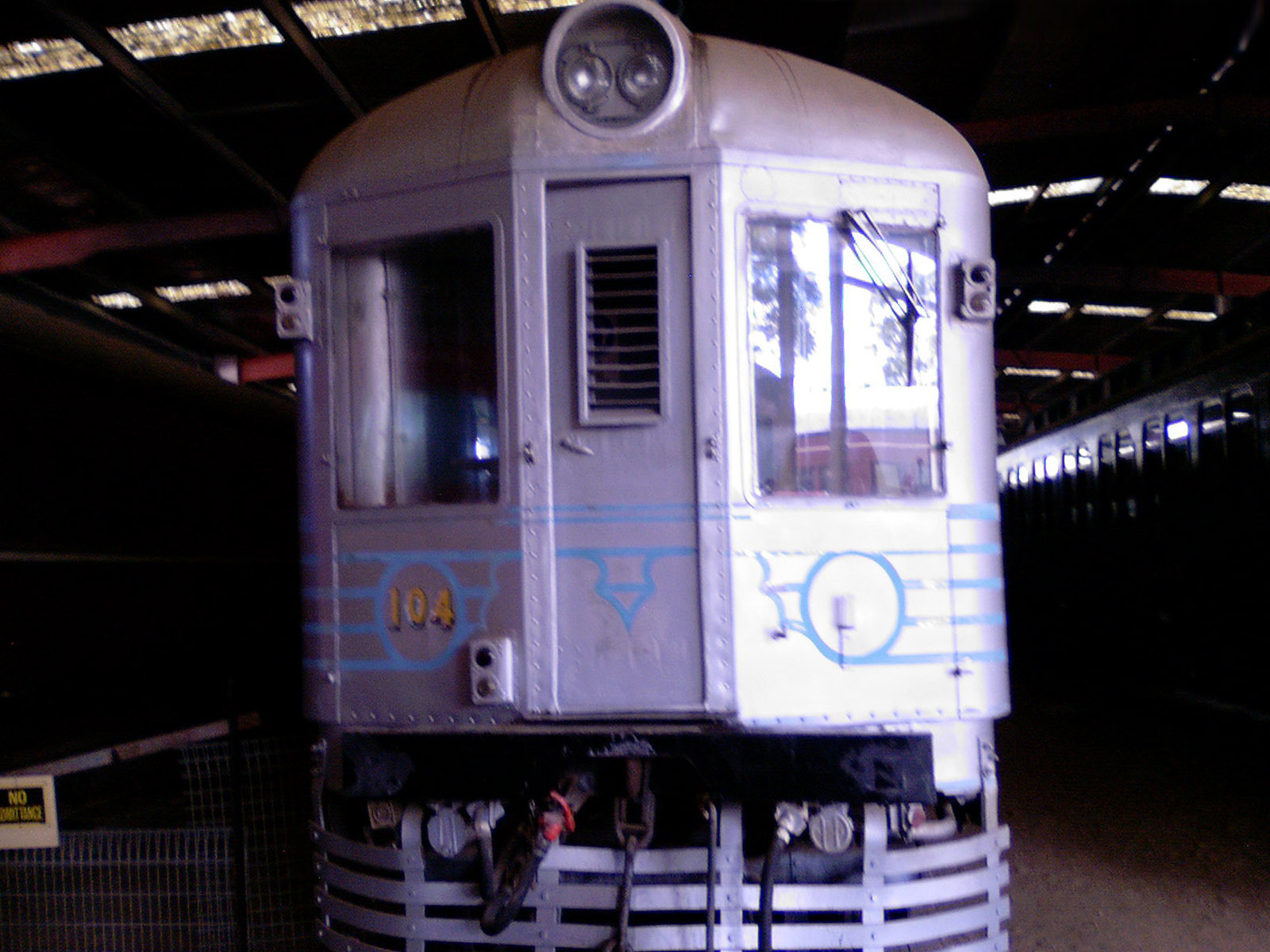
Power van DP 104

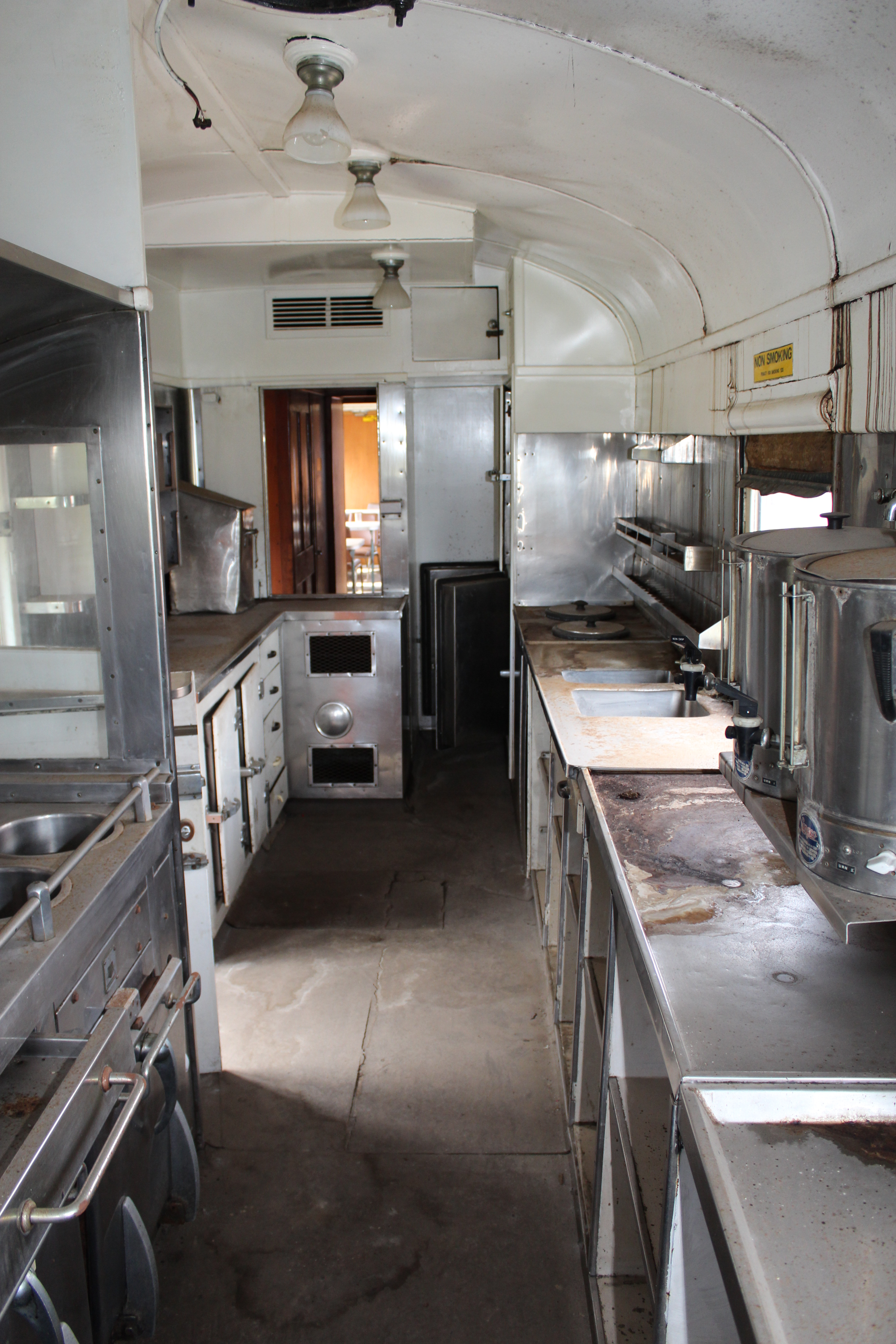
Buffet kitchen area trailer car DR 205

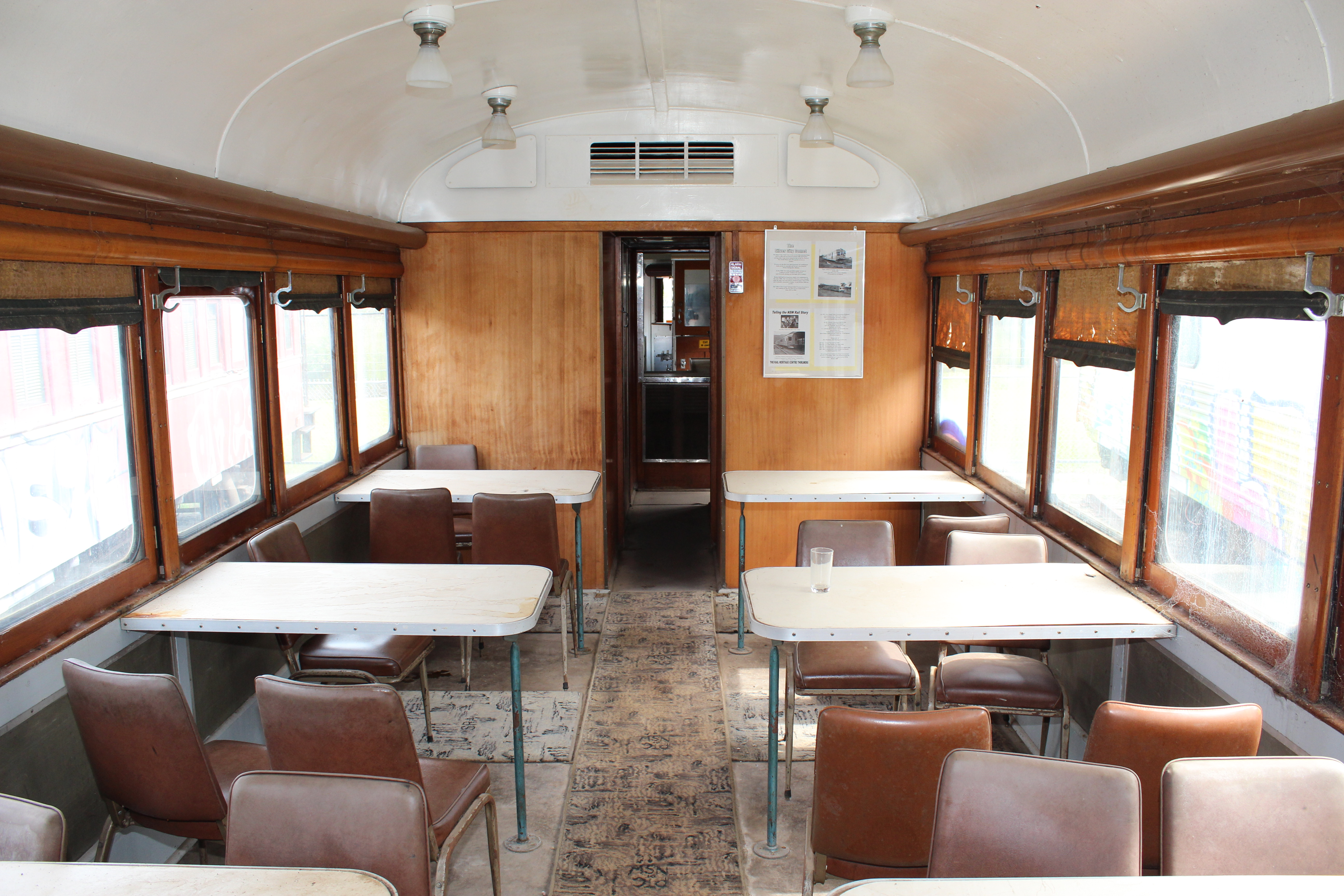
Dining Area trailer car DR 205
