= Sydney–Perth rail corridor =

Australia's east–west transcontinental railway route

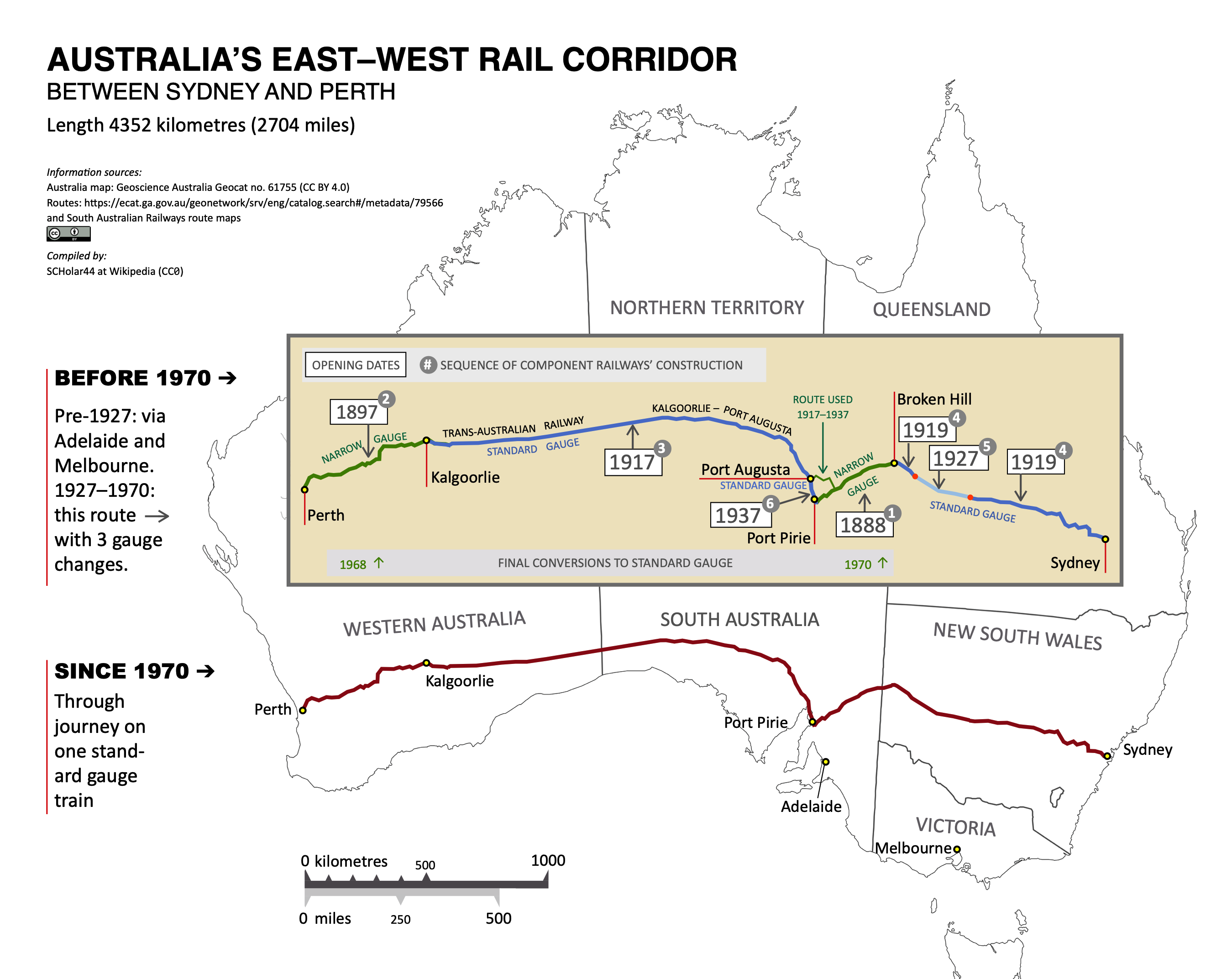
The 4352 kilometres (2704 mi) east–west rail corridor, before and after the gauge standardisation of 1970. It includes the 1691 kilometres (1051 mi) historically significant Trans-Australian Railway in the middle. (click to enlarge)

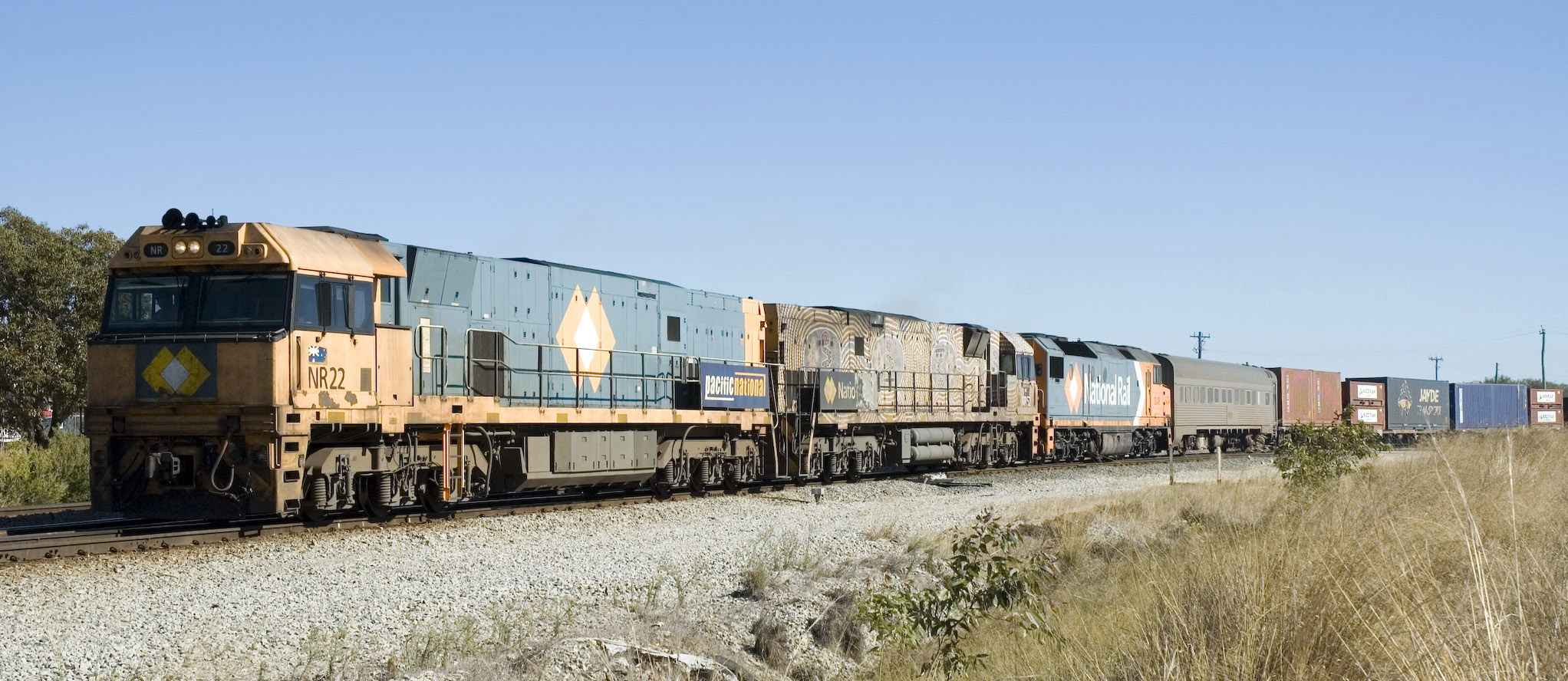
Leaving Kewdale Freight Terminal, Western Australia, is a typical freight train of the East–west rail corridor, with three locomotives totalling 9340 hp (10,490 kW) power output, a crew car, and a train of up to 1.8 km of container cars (many of them double-stacked)

The Sydney–Perth rail corridor, also known as the East–west rail corridor, is a 1435 mm (4 ft 8 1/2 in) standard gauge railway route that runs for 4352 kilometres (2704 mi) across Australia from Sydney, New South Wales, to Perth, Western Australia. Most of the route is under the control of the Australian Rail Track Corporation.

The corridor is heavily trafficked by long-distance freight trains. As of 2008, the rail corridor carried 81 per cent of land freight between the eastern states and Perth, up from 60 per cent in 1996–97; and in November 2007, 3.46 billion gross tonne-kilometres of freight was carried, a record at the time.

As of 2022, major freight operators on the corridor included Pacific National, Aurizon, and SCT Logistics.

The Indian Pacific, an experiential tourism passenger train, operates along the entire route, with the journey typically taking three days. Its sister train, The Ghan, travels over part of the corridor – from Adelaide to Tarcoola – before it proceeds north to Darwin. Some local passenger services operate at each end (in Western Australia and New South Wales) but not in the central part, in South Australia.

Until the route was converted to standard gauge in 1970, differing choices of track gauges by three state governments required passengers and freight to be trans-shipped at Broken Hill, Port Pirie, and Kalgoorlie. These stations were on the following lines (from east to west):

- the New South Wales government's standard-gauge Sydney–Broken Hill line, opened in 1927
- the Silverton Tramway Company's short narrow-gauge line from Broken Hill to Cockburn, opened in 1888
- the South Australian government's narrow-gauge Cockburn–Port Pirie line, completed in 1888
- the Australian federal government's standard-gauge Port Pirie–Port Augusta line, opened in 1937, and its contiguous standard-gauge Trans-Australian Railway, opened in 1917 as a major project following Australia's federation
- the Western Australian government's narrow-gauge Eastern Goldfields Railway from Kalgoorlie to Perth, opened in 1897.

== Bibliography ==
- Avery, Rod (2006). Freight Across the Nation: The Australian Superfreighter Experience. Brisbane: Copyright Publishing Co. ISBN 1876344474.
