= Broken Hill railway line =

Railway line in New South Wales, Australia

Broken Hill line
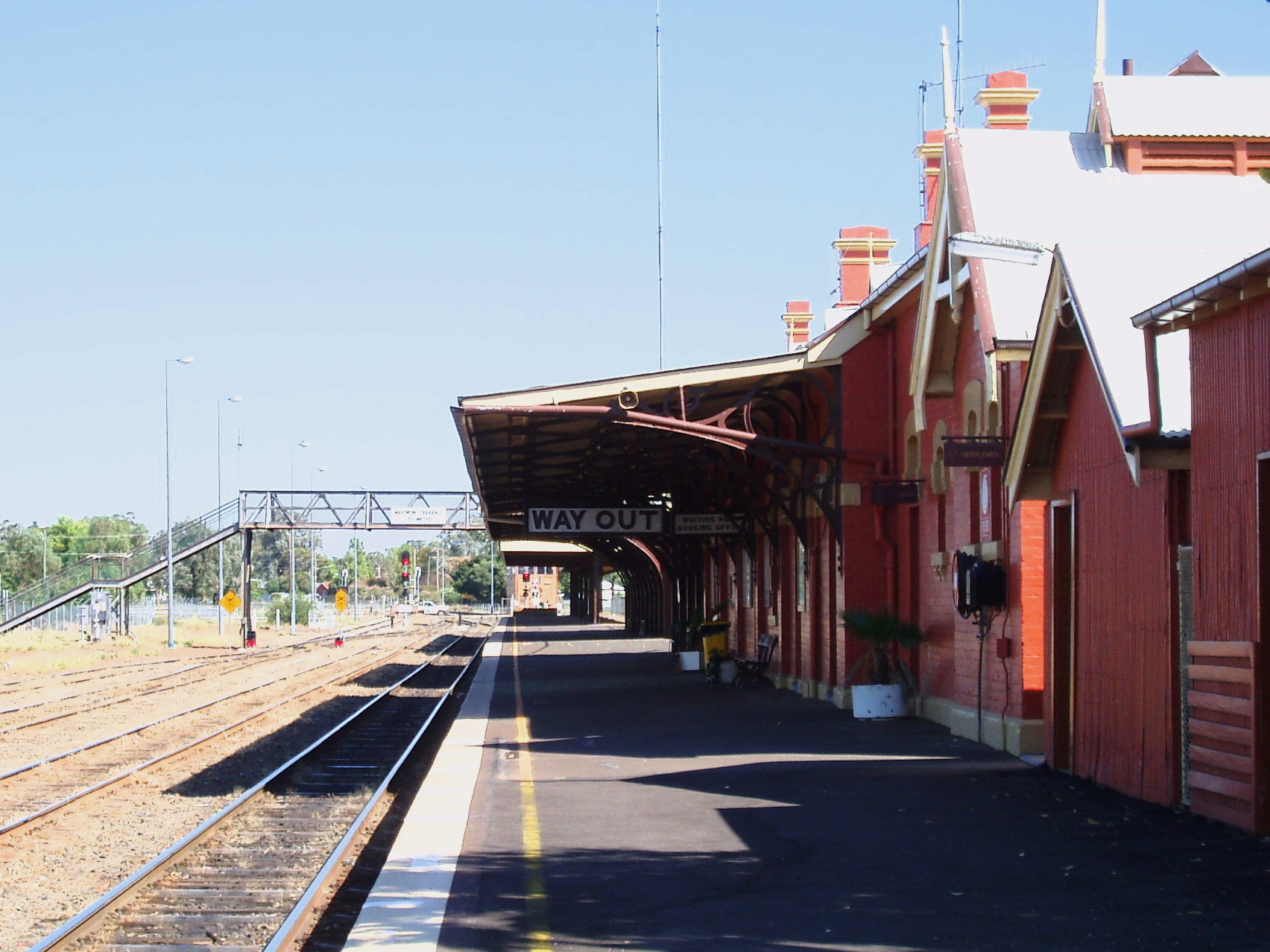
- Broken Hill line at Parkes railway station

Overview
- Status: Open
- Termini: Orange; Broken Hill

History
- Commenced: 1885
- Completed: 1919

Technical
- Track gauge: 1,435 mm (4 ft 8 1/2 in) standard gauge

The Broken Hill railway line, extending 801 kilometres (498 miles) from Orange, New South Wales to Broken Hill, is a railway line that is now part of the transcontinental rail corridor from Sydney to Perth.

The first railway line in New South Wales opened from Sydney to Parramatta Junction (near Granville station) in 1855 and was extended as the Main Western line in stages to Orange in 1877. The Broken Hill line branched off the Main Western line at Orange and was opened to Molong in 1885. It was extended to Parkes and Forbes in 1893, and extended from Parkes to Bogan Gate and Condobolin in 1898. Roto and Trida were reached in 1919.

A gap remained between Trida and Menindee after an isolated 1435 mm (4 ft 8 1/2 in) standard gauge standard-gauge line was opened from Menindee to the town of Broken Hill in 1919. At Broken Hill, the railway met the 1067 mm (3 ft 6 in) narrow-gauge Silverton Tramway at a break-of-gauge. At Cockburn, the Silverton Tramway connected with the South Australian Railways system to Port Pirie and via a break of gauge at Terowie to Adelaide. The final missing link between Trida and Menindee was completed in 1927. The Broken Hill Express, running from Sydney to Broken Hill, was introduced from November 1927. Included in its composition was Dining Car AB90, making it the first regularly scheduled Dining Car in that state. In 1970, the standardised Broken Hill – Port Pirie line was opened, completing the Sydney–Perth standard gauge link. Today, the line is utilised by the Outback Xplorer from Sydney Central to Broken Hill, as well as the transcontinental Indian Pacific from Sydney to Perth.

== Branch line ==
A branch line was opened from Molong to Dubbo as an alternative route with better grades in 1925. It closed in 1987. Another branch line was opened from Bogan Gate to Trundle in 1907, Tullamore in 1908 and Tottenham in 1916.

== Crossing loops ==
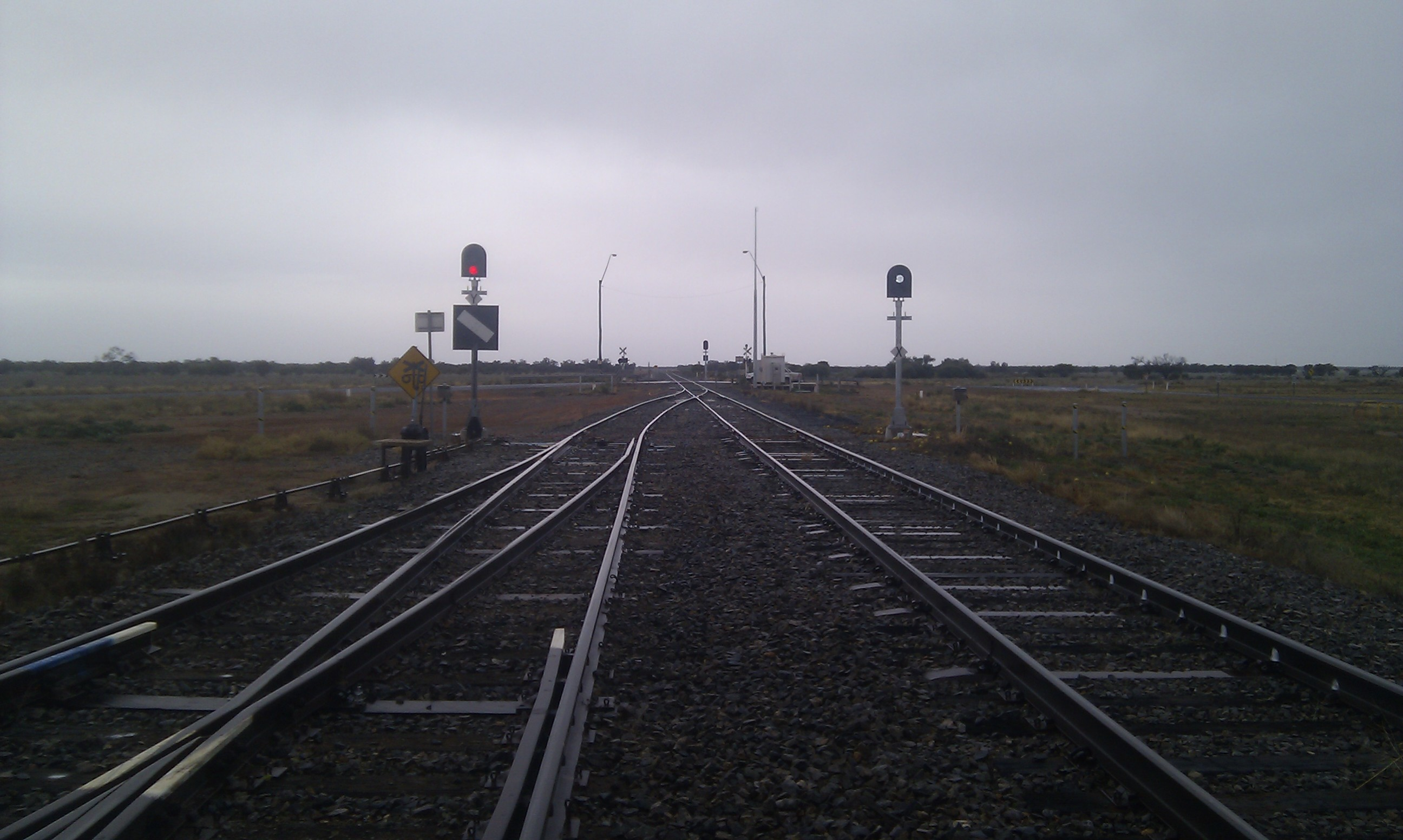
Ivanhoe crossing loop

The maximum length of trains on this line is 1,800 metres (5,900 ft), but only some of the crossing loops are of this length.

== See also ==
- Rail transport in New South Wales
