= Trida, New South Wales =

Place in Australia

Coordinates: 33°01′S 145°01′E

Trida is a locality in Central Darling Shire in the Far West region of New South Wales, Australia.

== Original inhabitants ==
Tride lay within the territory of the Wangaibon.

== Village ==
Records show that a Hotel existed at Trida with the licence being established in 1889 by an Alexander Pearce. The Hotel known simply as the Trida Hotel.

The remains of a small one room school were visible until recent times and a post office with telephone switchboard also once operated adjacent to the railway platform.

== Railway ==
Trida was the terminus of the Broken Hill line between 10 February 1919 and 19 August 1925, from 1925 the line was completed between Sydney and Broken Hill. The station platform at Trida was opened on 10 February 1919 and is now closed (date of closure unknown). Trida remains a train crossing location where two trains can meet and pass one another on a 1,800 metre long section of double railway track, 750 rail kilometres from Sydney. Trida crossing loop is between the adjacent crossing locations of Matakana and Ivanhoe.

== Road access ==
Two road pass through Trida, both are narrow unsealed dry weather only gravel roads. The Roto to Ivanhoe road passes parallel (east-west) to the adjacent railway mainline. The Trida to Hillston road intersects the previously mentioned Roto to Ivanhoe Road, crosses the railway line and travels south to Hillston.

== Climate ==
The Bureau of Meteorology classify this climatic zone as the Hot Dry Zone (with cooler winters). Places in this zone can be very hot in the summer months while in the winter, nights can be very cold.
