= Outback Xplorer =

Passenger rail service in New South Wales, Australia

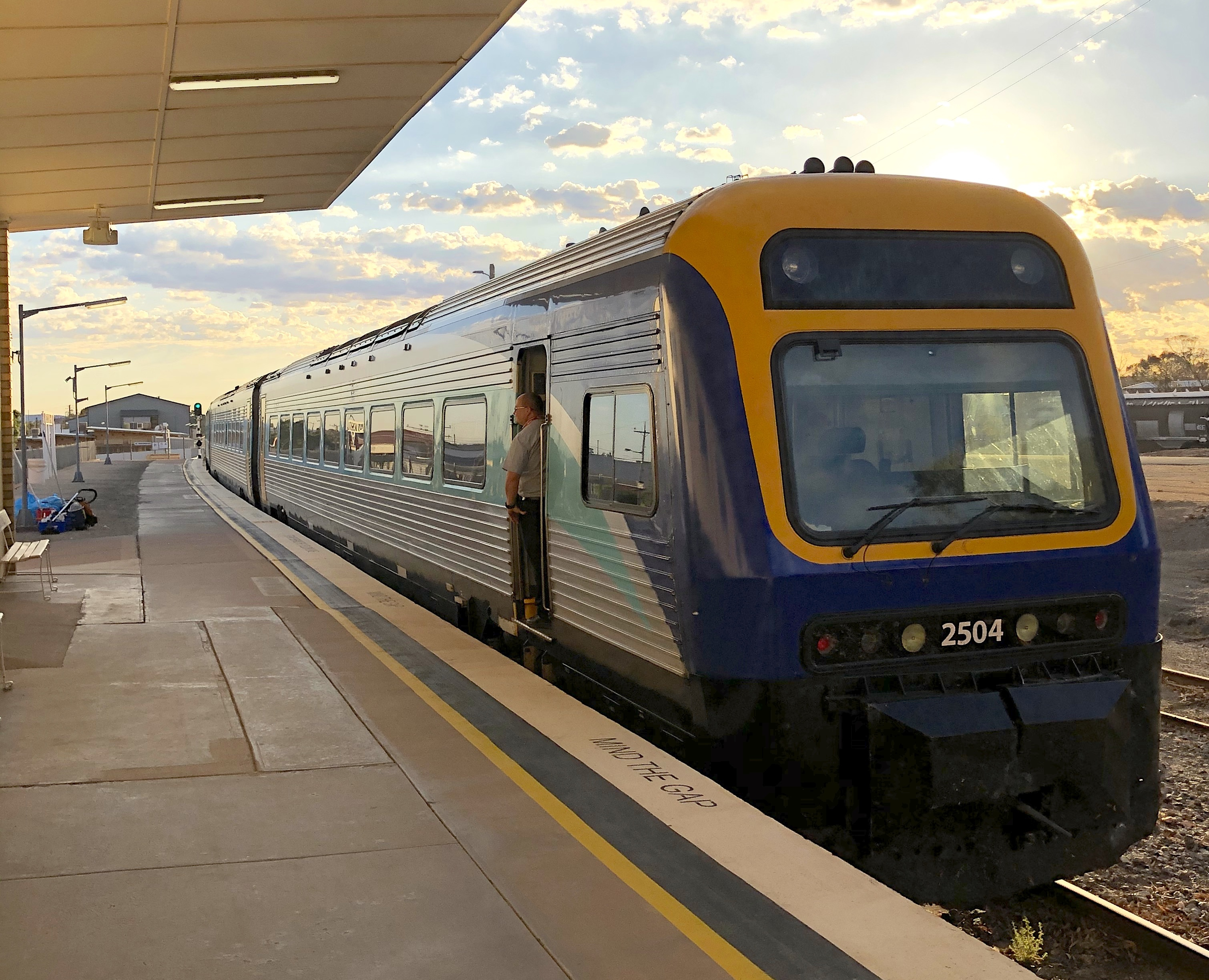
- The Outback Xplorer leaving Broken Hill on the morning of 10 March 2020. Note the special coupler covering used for protection against wildlife.

Overview
- Service type: Passenger train
- Status: Operational
- First service: March 1996
- Current operator: NSW TrainLink
- Former operator: State Rail Authority CountryLink

Route
- Termini: Sydney; Broken Hill
- Stops: 15
- Distance travelled: 1,125 kilometres
- Average journey time: 13 hours
- Service frequency: Weekly
- Lines used: Main Western; Broken Hill

On-board services
- Classes: First class & Economy
- Seating arrangements: 2x2 configuration
- Catering facilities: On-board buffet
- Baggage facilities: Overhead racks

Technical
- Rolling stock: Xplorer

The Outback Xplorer is an Australian passenger train service operated by NSW TrainLink between Sydney and Broken Hill that passes through the Main Western line. Commencing in March 1996, it was initially a locomotive-pulled service. It ceased in early 2000 due to the poor state of the passenger carriages, but resumed in May 2000 using Xplorer railcars.

== History ==
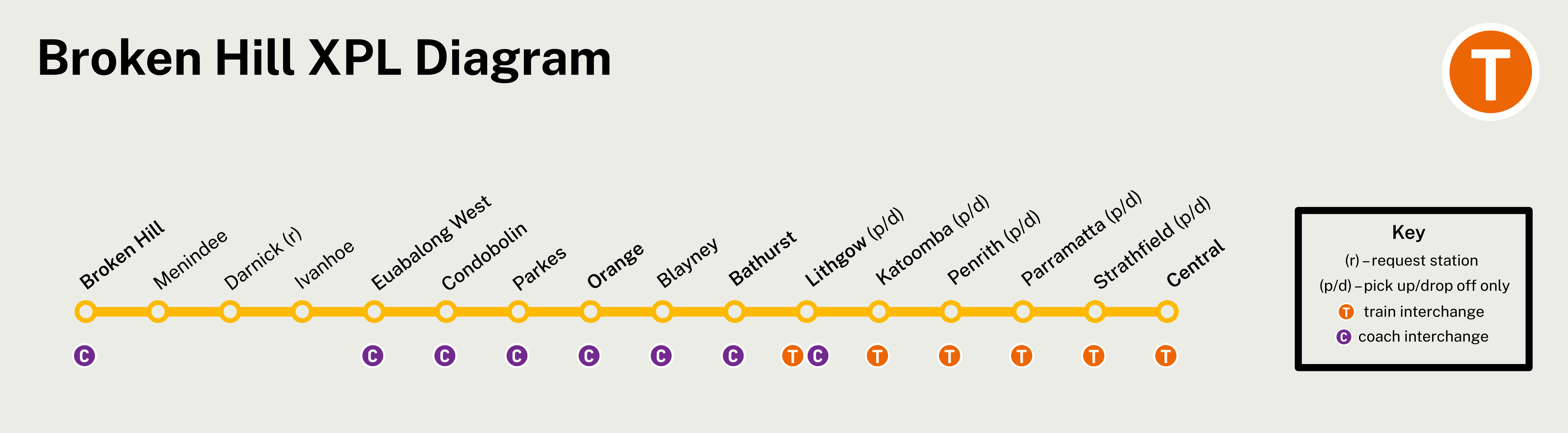
Diagram of the Broken Hill Xplorer.

CountryLink commenced operating the service in March 1996 honouring a commitment by the Carr State Government to reintroduce a rail service to Broken Hill which had lost its rail service when the Silver City Comet was replaced by a road coach service in November 1989.

Unofficially known as the Outback Express, it was initially formed of 1940s vintage locomotive-hauled HUB/RUB carriages, usually hauled by a Clyde Engineering built 81 class locomotive. In April 2000, the service ceased due to the condition of the carriages.

In May 2000, the service resumed with Xplorer railcars, operating as a set of three with carriage numbering A (first class and buffet car), B (economy) and D (economy with disability access seating area/toilet facilities). Since the introduction of Xplorer railcars, the service runs to Broken Hill on Mondays, returning to Sydney on Tuesdays.

== See also ==
- Broken Hill Xplorer travel guide from Wikivoyage
