= Broken Hill railway station =

Railway station in New South Wales, Australia

Broken Hill
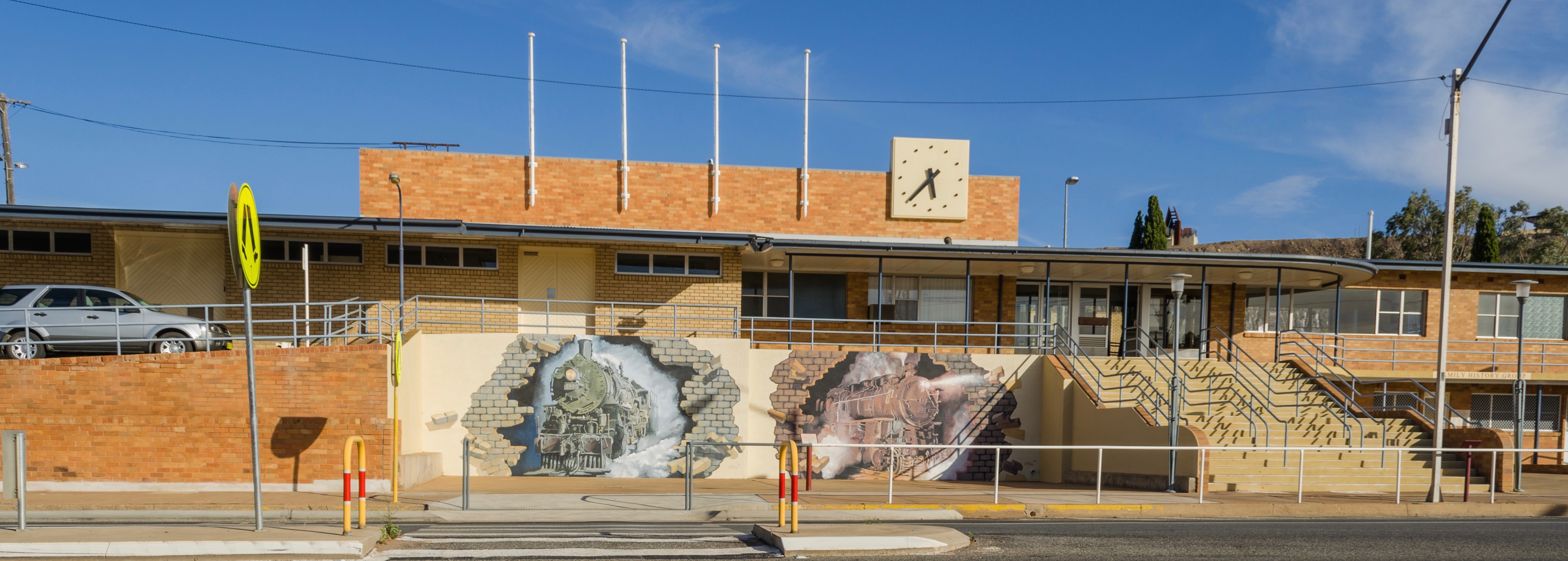
- Street frontage in October 2013

General information
- Location: Silver City Highway, Broken Hill; Australia
- Coordinates: 31°57′37″S 141°28′00″E
- Owner: Transport Asset Manager of New South Wales
- Operator: NSW TrainLink
- Lines: Western; Indian Pacific
- Distance: 1,124.80 kilometres from Central
- Platforms: 1
- Tracks: 2

Construction
- Structure type: Ground
- Accessible: Yes

Other information
- Station code: BHQ
- Website: www.transportnsw.info

History
- Opened: 4 June 1957

Passengers
- 2023: 6,578

Services
Preceding station	NSW TrainLink	Following station
Terminus	NSW TrainLink Western Line Outback Xplorer	Menindee towards Sydney
Preceding station	Journey Beyond	Following station
Adelaide towards Perth	Indian Pacific	Mount Victoria towards Sydney
Location

Broken Hill railway station is a heritage-listed railway station located on the Broken Hill line in the center of Broken Hill, New South Wales, Australia. Opened in 1957, the station is crucial as it is the only rail access to Broken Hill. It is serviced by the Outback Xplorer and the Indian Pacific.

== History ==
=== Broken Hill Crystal Street ===
Broken Hill Crystal Street railway station opened on 15 July 1919 when the line opened to Menindee. Until extended further east in 1927, the section was not connected to the rest of the New South Wales Government Railways network.

Broken Hill's first railway connection arrived in 1888, with the Silverton Tramway connecting the city to the South Australian Railways' narrow-gauge system at Cockburn and on to Adelaide via Sulphide Street station. Broken Hill developed into a lucrative location with the mines providing a regular source of traffic.

=== Current station ===
A new brick station opened on 4 June 1957, 560 metres west of the original station.

As part of the construction of the project to convert to standard gauge the Sydney to Perth railway line, in 1969 the station platform was extended to 370 metres accommodate the Indian Pacific with a new signal box constructed at the western end of the station building. With modern centralised train control, the signal box is no longer staffed.

Although some 50 kilometres from the border, Broken Hill was the border station between New South Wales and South Australia, with interstate trains changing locomotives up until the 1990s in the era of state-owned railway networks.

== Services ==
From September 1937 until November 1989, Broken Hill was the terminus for the Silver City Comet from Orange. It was also the terminus for Australian National's Silver City Limited from Adelaide from December 1986 until December 1990. It was served by The Alice from Sydney to Alice Springs from November 1983 until October 1987.

Since March 1996, Broken Hill has been served by NSW TrainLink's weekly Outback Express to and from Sydney. NSW TrainLink also operates road coach services to Adelaide, Dubbo and Mildura which leave from the city's Tourist Information Centre bus terminal.

Since it introduction in February 1970, Journey Beyond's weekly Indian Pacific has called at Broken Hill. Initially operating twice weekly, in July 1973 it was increased to three times weekly, and in July 1975 to four times per week. Today it operates weekly.

Platform	Line	Stopping pattern	Notes
1	Indian Pacific	to East Perth or Sydney Central	
1	Western Region	services to Sydney Central	
