= Borenore railway station =

Former railway station in New South Wales, Australia

Borenore
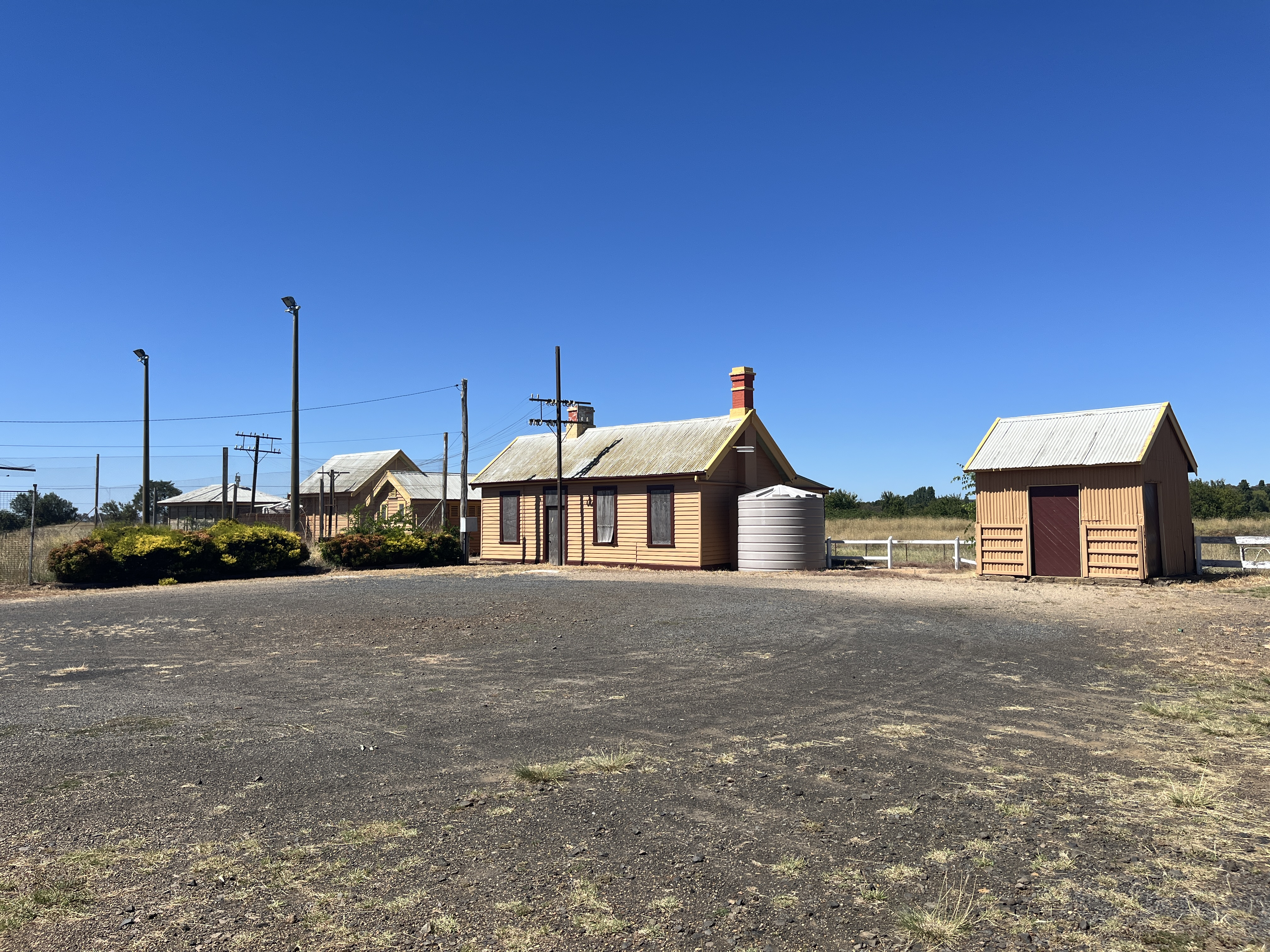
- The remaining station buildings viewed from the entrance in January 2026

General information
- Location: Borenore Road, Borenore; New South Wales; Australia
- Coordinates: 33°15′14″S 148°58′37″E
- Line: Broken Hill
- Distance: 338.160 km (210.123 mi) from Central
- Platforms: 1 (1 side)

Construction
- Structure type: Ground

Other information
- Status: Disused

History
- Opened: 21 December 1885 (140 years ago)

Services
| Preceding station | Former services | Following station |
|---|---|---|
| Amaroo towards Broken Hill | Broken Hill Line | Canobolas towards Orange |
Location

Borenore railway station is a former regional railway station located on the Broken Hill line, in the Central West town of Borenore. The station opened in 1885 and was closed at an unknown date.

== History ==
Borenore station was opened on 21 December 1885. It was closed at an unknown date, though the station buildings survive largely intact. They were in use by the local tennis club however, this is no longer the case and the station is disused and locked with the exception of the station bathrooms.

== Gallery ==
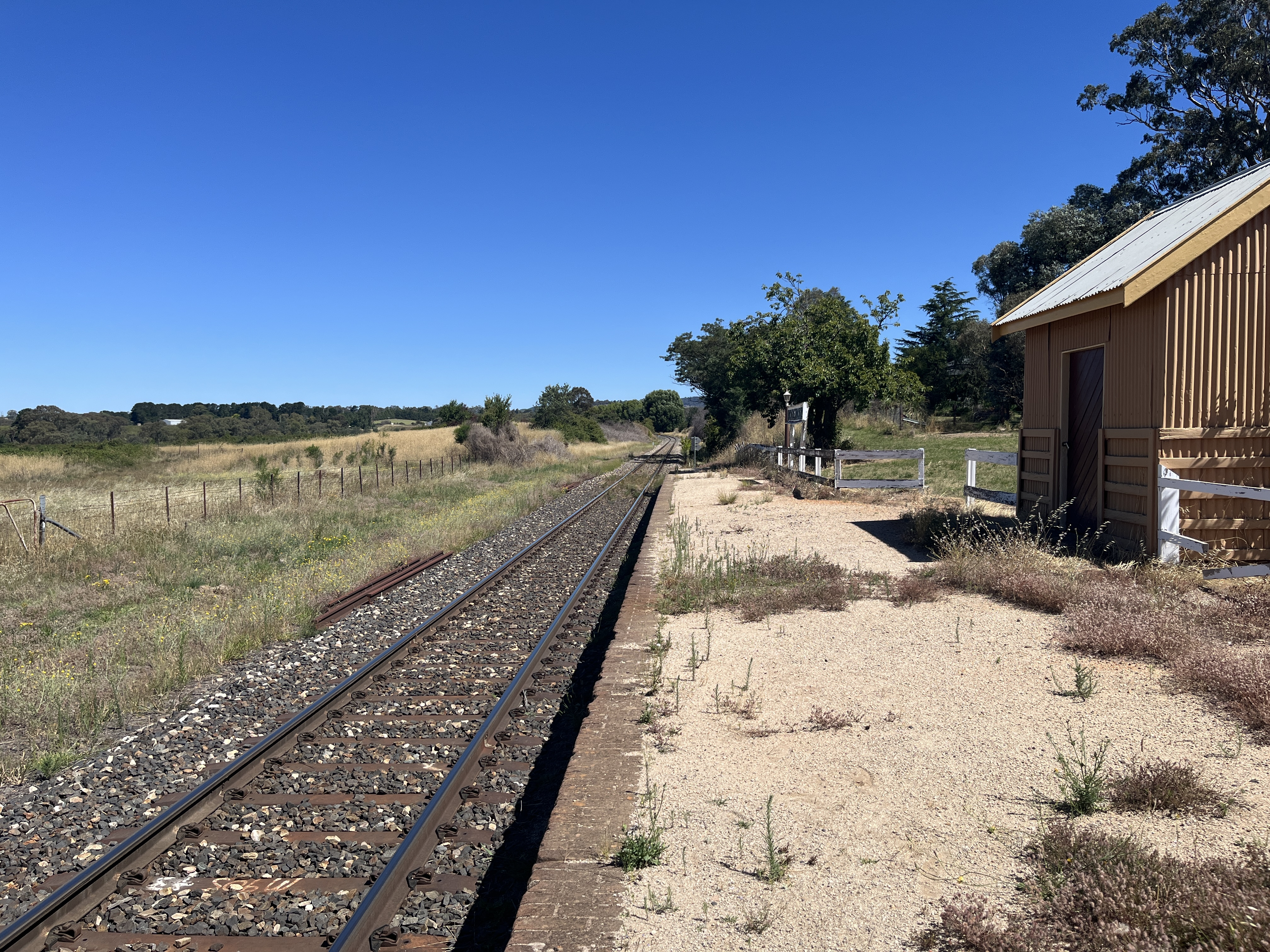
The station platform viewed eastbound towards Orange.

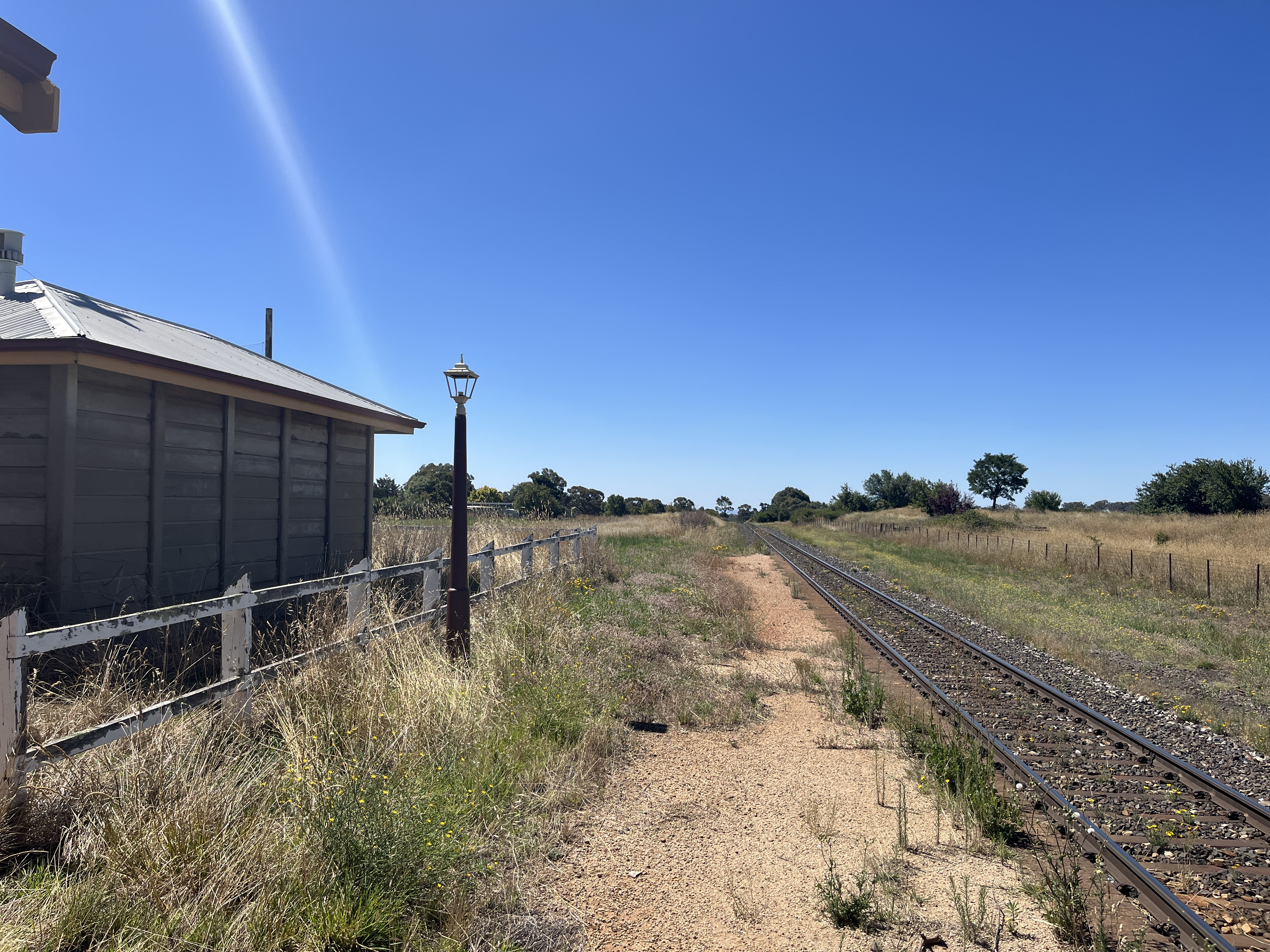
The station platform viewed westbound towards Broken Hill.

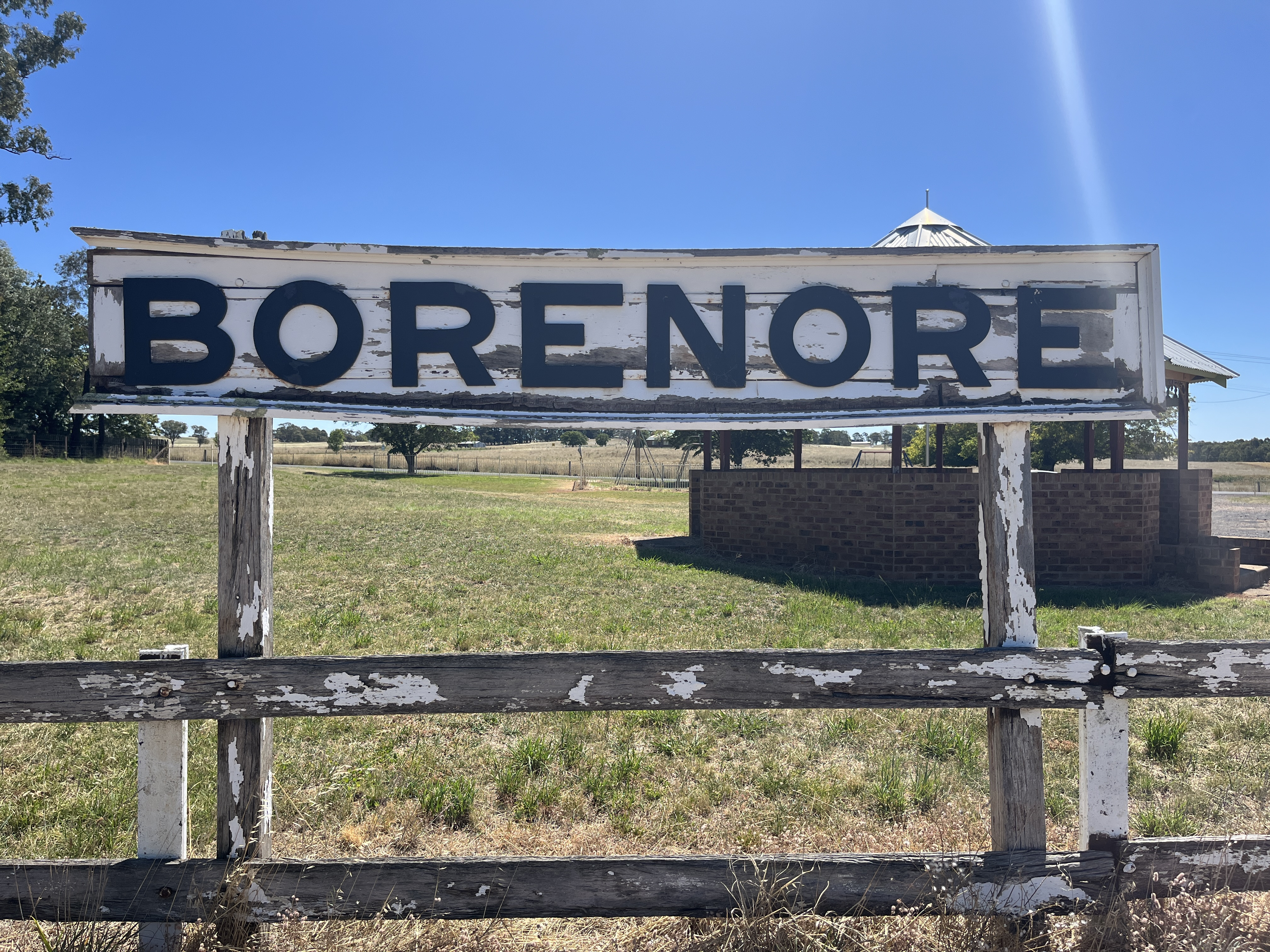
Remains of the station nameboard

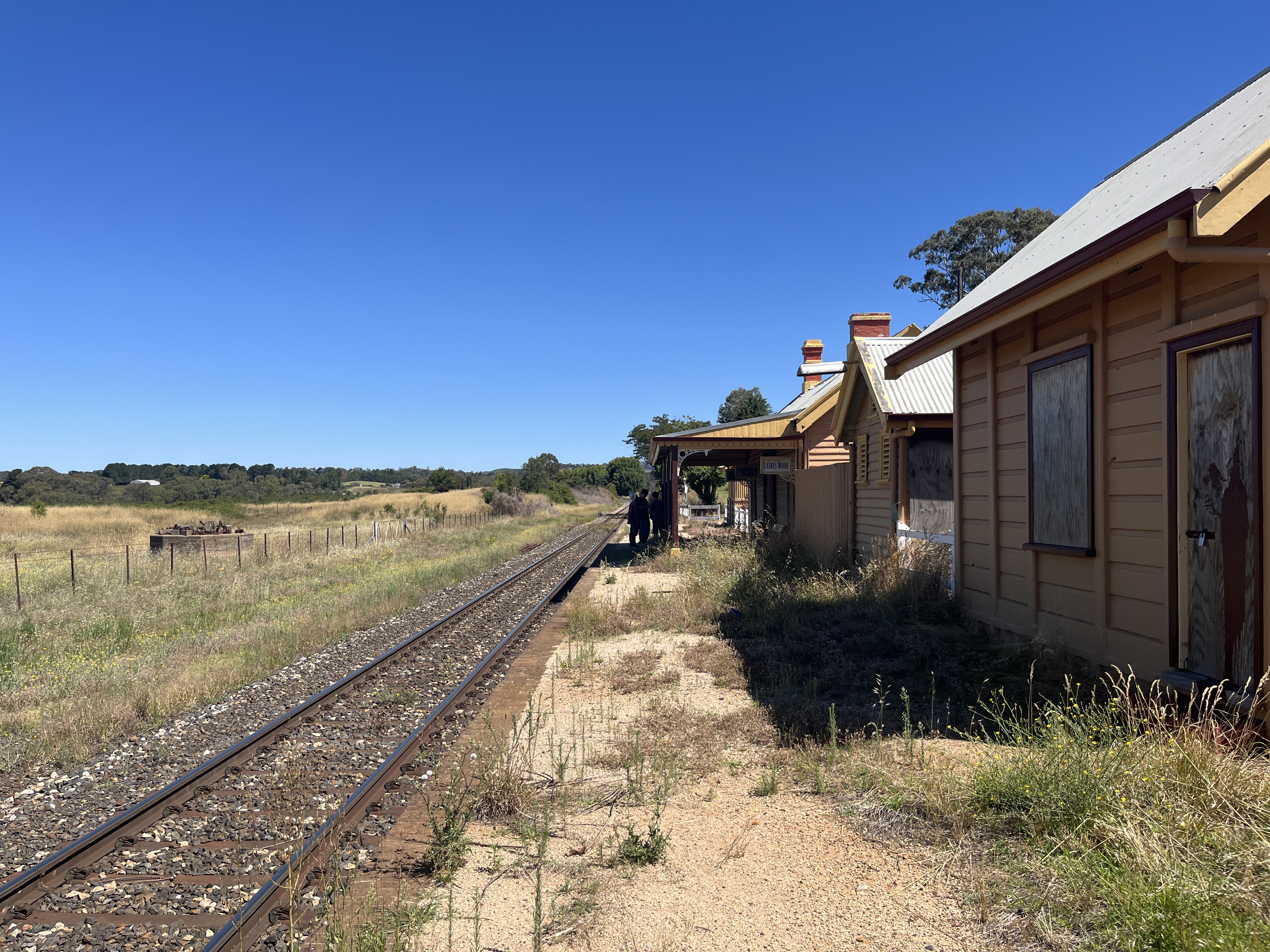
Eastbound view towards Orange past the station buildings
