= Borenore, New South Wales =

Coordinates: 33°15′S 148°58′E

Borenore New South Wales
- Population: 476 (SAL 2021)
- Postcode(s): 2800
- LGA(s): Cabonne Shire
- State electorate(s): Orange
- Federal division(s): Calare

Borenore is a small rural community located 14 kilometres (8.7 miles) west of Orange along The Escort Way, in the central western region of New South Wales. Borenore is situated in the Cabonne Shire local government area.

== History ==
The area now known as Borenore lies on the traditional lands of the Wiradjuri people.

The first settler homes in the Borenore district were built in the early 1860s. Borenore soon became a large settlement. The first European settlers adopted the aboriginal name of the area "Bora-Nora". A Bora is the name given both to an initiation ceremony of Indigenous Australians, and to the site on which the initiation is performed. At such a site, boys achieve the status of men. "Nora" refers to the overhanging rock near where such ceremonies were held, probably around the area of the Borenore Caves. The original spelling and pronunciation of Bora-Nora is said to have been altered on maps made in Sydney and became Borenore.

The first recorded settler in the area of what is now known as Borenore was William Wentworth. After his conquest of the Blue Mountains, Wentworth pushed further into the Central Western region. In 1820s Wentworth squatted at Boree. At that time what is now the County of Wellington was considered to be outside the bounds of civilised settlement. Wentworth held an area that extended from Boree to Mount Canobolas to Toogong to Borenore.

The first survey of the Orange district was done in 1828/29. This was followed by Major Mitchell's expedition to the Darling in 1835 during which he passed through the Borenore area. An entry in his journal dated 5 April 1835:

"Here I at length took leave of my friend, to pursue a long and dreary ride along the track which led to Buree. The wood consisted chiefly of those kinds of eucalyptus, termed box and apple-tree – forming a very open kind of forest, the hollows being in general quite clear of trees. The farther I proceeded westward, the more the country exhibited the withering effects of long drought. The mountain mass of the Canobolas, lay to the southward of my route; and on crossing the lofty range which here divides the counties of Bathurst and Wellington, the summit was distant only four miles. The country in the neighbourhood of that mass, consists of trap and limestone, and is, upon the whole, very favourable for sheep-farming. The region to the westward of the Canobolas is still unsurveyed, being beyond the limits of the county divisions."

The area would be used by Mitchell as the assembly location for his second, third and fourth expeditions. On his second expedition to the Darling and Bogan Rivers, Michell met the main party there; it had come from Parramatta, under the command of Mitchell's second-in-command, his Assistant Surveyor, James Larmer. The Borenore area was the homeland of a Wirajuri man, Yuranigh, who Mitchell described in his journal as his "guide, companion, counsellor and friend". Yuranigh's main contribution, to Mitchell's fourth expedition, lay in his ability to negotiate with other Aboriginal people, through whose territory they passed, and in his extensive bush lore and knowledge of country, with which he advised Mitchell.

In 1836, Mitchell visited the "Little Caves" at the Borenore Caves and collected some bones of extinct animals.

== Australian National Field Days ==
Borenore is home to the Australian National Field Days. The Australian National Field Days is an annual agricultural exhibition. Each year it attracts around 20,000 people and over 600 exhibitors over 3 days in October.

== Borenore School ==
Education in Borenore began with small part-time schools, one of the earliest being a family one at Stanley Farm where the Watts family settled. In 1875 an application was lodged to the Council of Education for the establishment of a public school at Borenore. The building was completed in May 1878.

== Borenore railway station ==
The first train to reach the Borenore Railway Station on the Broken Hill railway line arrived on 21 December 1885. The station is now closed. The station buildings were used by the local tennis club but this has since become defunct. All but the old station bathrooms are closed to the public and disused.
