= Parkes railway station =

Railway station in New South Wales, Australia

Parkes
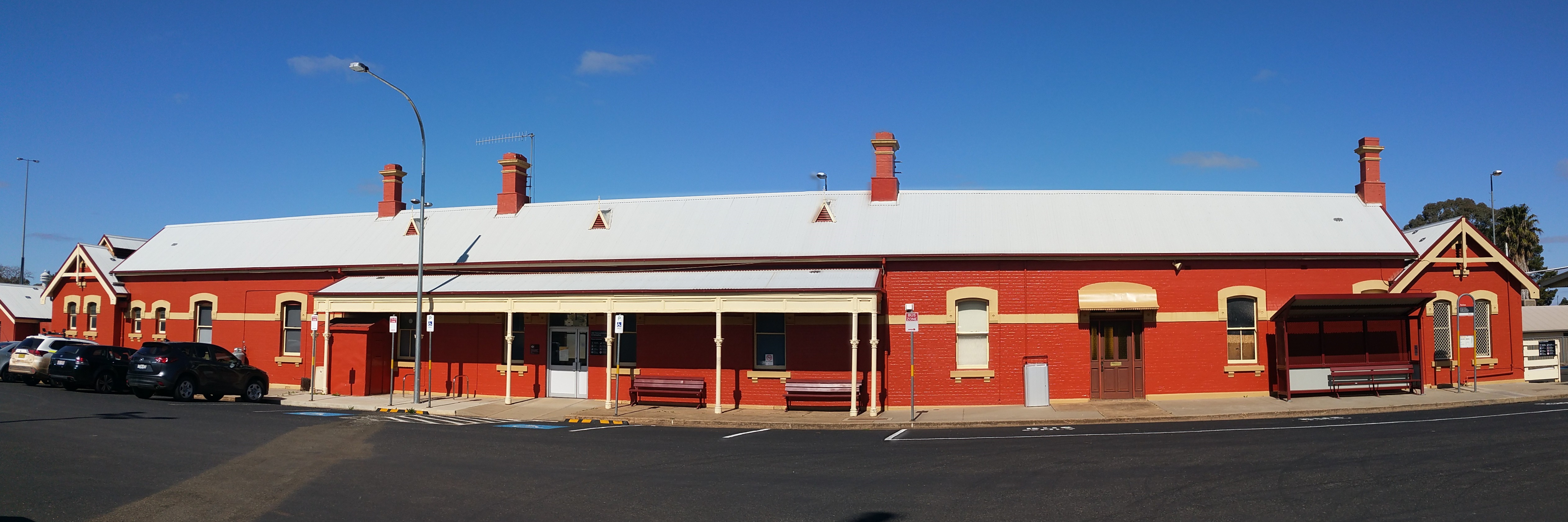
- Station building in August 2018

General information
- Location: Welcome Street, Parkes, New South Wales; Australia
- Coordinates: 33°08′32″S 148°10′24″E
- Owner: Transport Asset Manager of New South Wales
- Operator: NSW TrainLink
- Line: Broken Hill
- Distance: 445.5 km (276.8 mi) from Sydney Central
- Platforms: 1
- Tracks: 4

Construction
- Structure type: Ground
- Accessible: Yes

Other information
- Station code: PKE

History
- Opened: 18 December 1893

Services
Preceding station	NSW TrainLink	Following station
Condobolin towards Broken Hill	NSW TrainLink Western Line Broken Hill Outback Xplorer	Orange towards Sydney
Former services
Preceding station	Former services	Following station
Brolgan towards Broken Hill	Broken Hill Line	Mogincoble towards Orange
Tichborne towards Stockinbingal	Stockinbingal–Parkes Line	Terminus
Terminus	Parkes–Narromine Line	Nanardine towards Narromine

New South Wales Heritage Register
- Official name: Parkes Railway Station group
- Type: State heritage (complex / group)
- Designated: 2 April 1999
- Reference no.: 1220
- Type: Railway Platform / Station
- Category: Transport – Rail
Location
- Location within New South Wales

Parkes railway station is a heritage-listed former locomotive depot and railway station and now locomotive roundhouse and railway station located on the Broken Hill line in May Street, Parkes in New South Wales, Australia. The railway station serves the town of Parkes and was built from 1881 to 1893. It is also known as the Parkes Railway Station group. The property was added to the New South Wales State Heritage Register on 2 April 1999.

== History ==
A railway Shop Order was issued on 7 December 1912 for the construction of a 'permanent "Rest House" at Parkes (Enginemans or crew barracks). This reference indicates that a "temporary" Rest House or Barracks was provided there much earlier, more likely at or near the time of opening, in the 1898 period. The style of barracks usually provided in the 1890s, up until the early 1900s at many locations in the state, usually consisted of what was known as 'Engine Driver's' and "Guards Accommodation". These buildings were of a railway standards design and resembled a moderately -sized hip roofed cottage. They usually had two or three bedrooms at the front of the building, a kitchen and meal room toward the rear, with a bathroom and laundry at the rear. The toilet was usually a separate building out in the yard. In this situation, a train crew (driver, fireman and guard) would all sleep in the one room, three iron bedsteads being provided. These buildings were provided at many locations at the time, and it was quite likely that one was built at Parkes, and remained there until the 1911 period. No evidence of the location of any such temporary structure was found at or near the present barracks building.

The Parkes station opened on 18 December 1893.

Parkes is the junction point for the Broken Hill, Stockingbingal-Parkes and Parkes-Narromine lines, the latter two form a cross country route between Cootamundra on the Main South line, and Werris Creek on the Main North line. As such it has always been an important railway town, and still maintains a locomotive depot.

A railway station also served Parkes Racecourse between 1923 and 1937. In June 1999, a Y junction opened to the west of the station removing the need for trains from Broken Hill to Cootamundra to operate via the station.

== Services ==
Parkes is served by NSW TrainLink's weekly Outback Xplorer between Sydney and Broken Hill.

Journey Beyond's weekly Indian Pacific passes Parkes, but does not stop at the station.

NSW TrainLink also operate road coach services to Lithgow and Condobolin.

The station also serves as the terminus for the yearly "Elvis Express" train, in coordination with the Parkes Elvis Festival.

Platform	Line	Stopping pattern	Notes
1	Western Region	services to Sydney Central & Broken Hill	

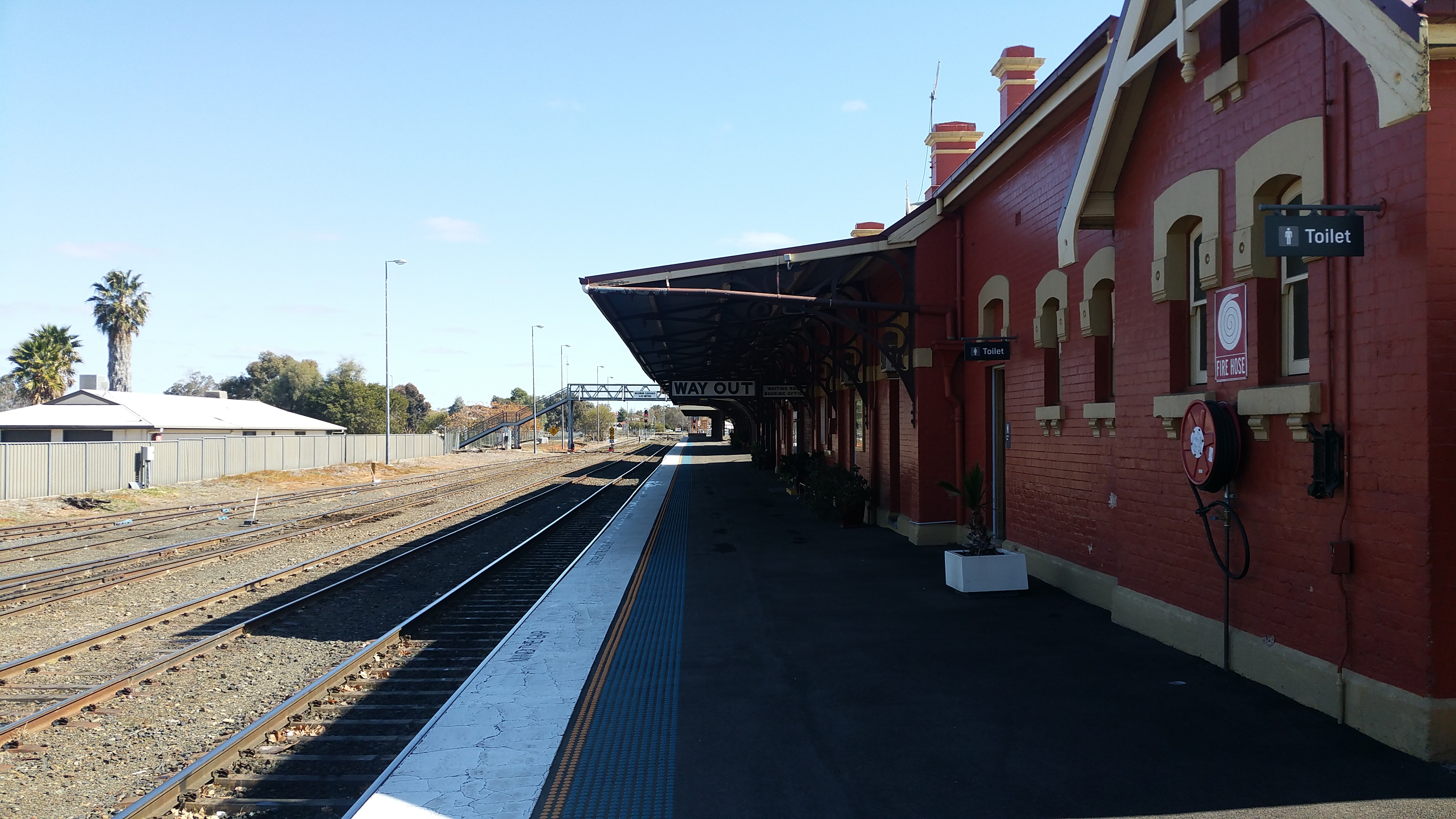
Northbound view

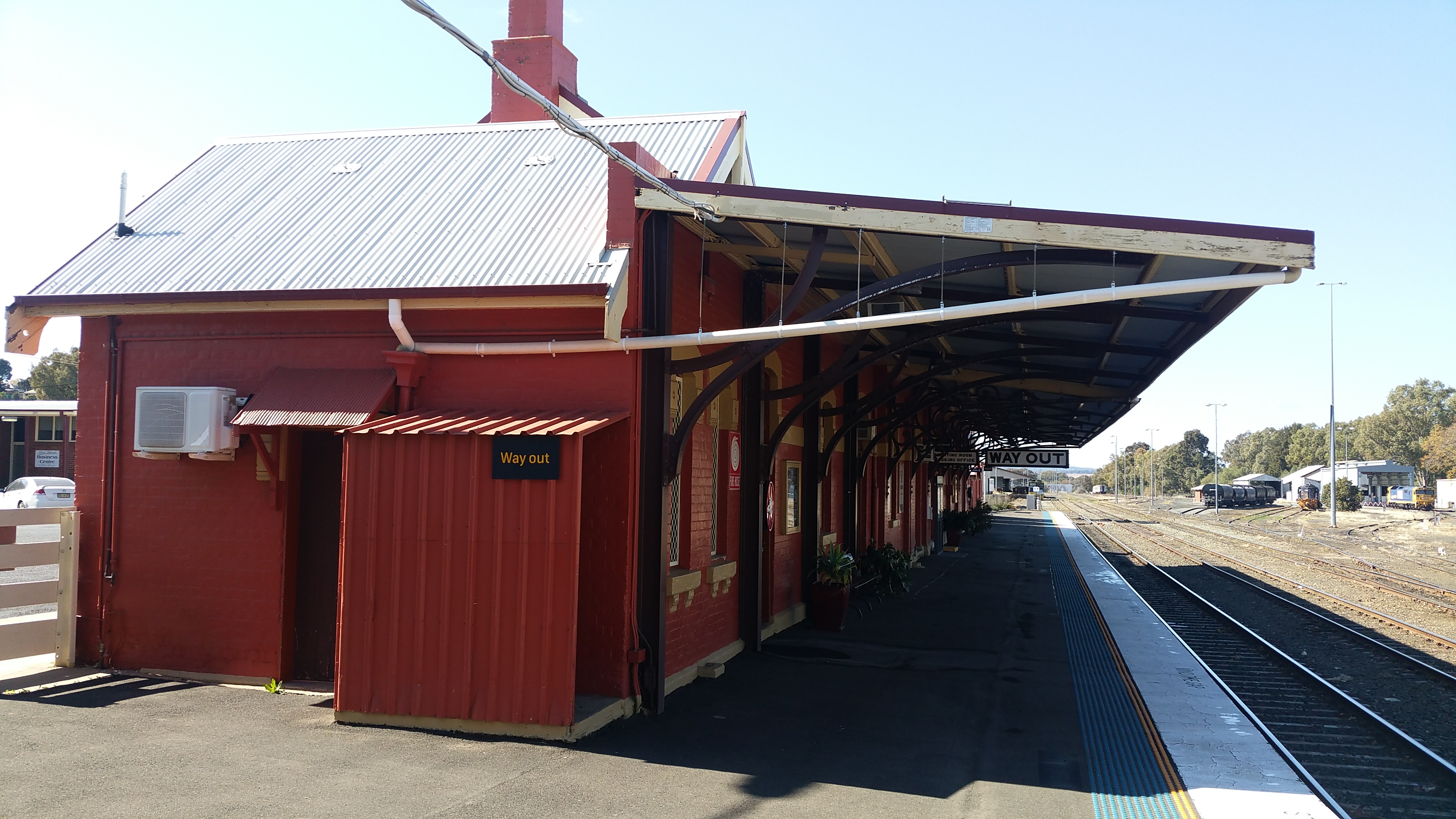
Southbound view

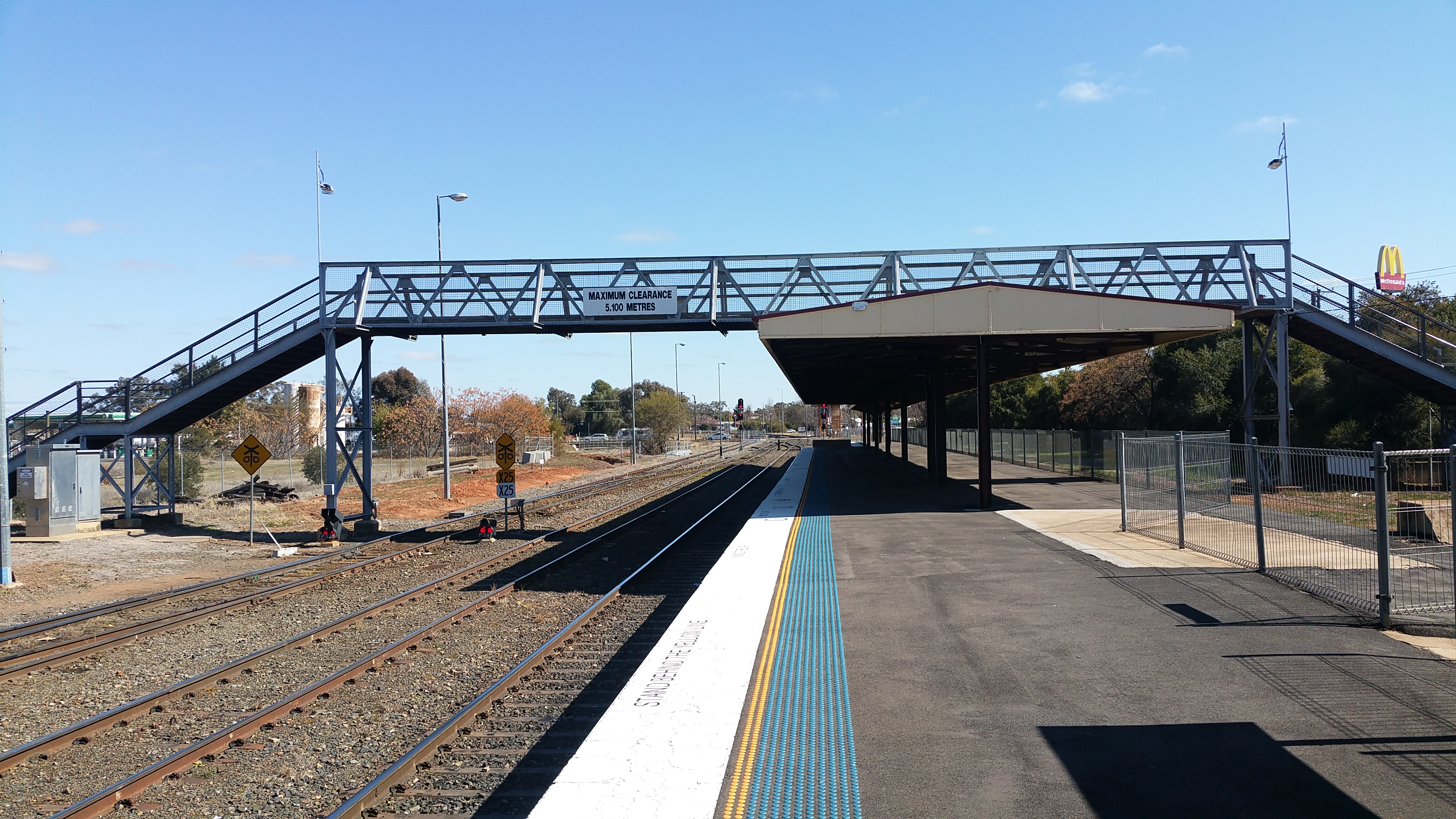
Footbridge and former terminating platform

== Description ==
The complex includes a type 4, brick standard roadside third class station building, completed in 1893, and brick platform; both managed by RailCorp. Other major structures includes a brick railway refreshment room, erected c. 1928; a type O, elevated fibro signal box, erected 1944; the 1942 railway precinct including locomotive servicing facilities including turntable; a goods shed; and the Silver City Comet Shed and associated structures; all managed by the Australian Rail Track Corporation (ARTC). The ARTC also manages a dock platform, a steel Warren truss footbridge, erected 1935; and a jib crane. The brick barracks building (c. 1912), former Railway Institute building (1962), and the repair siding shed are now owned and managed by Pacific National.

Station building and platform (1893)

The station building is an altered example of an 1893 standard roadside building. Originally the building was a five-room gabled building which featured a central waiting room with a Station Master's office and parcel office to the western side flanked by a shed and lamp room wing, with a ladies and gents waiting room to the east flanked by a bathroom wing. Historic plans show three brick chimneys and gablet vents and a front verandah to the entry which all still exist. Timber finials to gable ends still exist on the original detached wings.

The building underwent alterations in 1926 and further alterations in 1947 which extended the building to either end to incorporate the previous external wings in to the form of the main building and also altering the use of most rooms. The extensions were undertaken in a sympathetic manner including matching windows and an extended platform awning to match the existing. As such the building presents as a cohesive building that still retains its Victorian character. The brick platform dates from 1893 and was extended c. 1928 and features modern asphalt surfacing.

Railway refreshment rooms (c. 1928)

From historic plans it appears prior to the current building being erected on this site, that there were previously two small structures used as temporary Railway Refreshment rooms and accommodation for the staff. In 1923, a 12-by-6-metre (39 by 20 ft) marquee built of Birkmyre cloth with framing and flooring was erected as a refreshment room.

Plans from c. 1928 show the demolition of the previous structures and the erection of the existing brick building on the same site. Further historic plans show minor alterations in 1939 and a further extension to the west in 1943. The building is unusual in that it appears to be composed of two different buildings with a gabled part fronting on to the platform with a cantilevered awning, and a rear kitchen wing with a brick parapet with projecting string course.

Signal Box (1944)

Two-storey elevated fibro signal box with low hipped pyramid roof clad in concrete tiles. The signal box is no longer in use.

Footbridge (1935)

A steel riveted through Warren truss footbridge on steel trestles and channel iron stair stringers with Kembla markings on steel sections. The existing footbridge replaced an earlier footbridge which had been relocated from Liverpool in 1923. The bridge is noted as the last riveted truss footbridge constructed for the NSW network.

The station buildings including the 1920s and 1940s additions have a high level of integrity.

=== Modifications and dates ===
Numerous additions and changes occurred throughout the 20th century including erection of a rest house (1912), wheat silo (1920), Traffic District Headquarters located at Parkes (1920), purchase of existing residences for Station Master and Steam Shed Inspector, (1920 and 1922), conversion of existing Station Master's residence to railway refreshment room accommodation (1923), new footbridge relocated from Liverpool (1923), erection of temporary railway refreshment rooms (1923), alterations and additions to the station building (c. 1927) rail motor shed erected (1927), new railway refreshment rooms opened (1928), relocated footbridge and signal Box (1928) and a new roundhouse built (1928).

Later alterations to the site included a new footbridge (1935), an elevated coal bunker built (1941), roundhouse and facilities enlarged for defence works, including new 360 kilolitres (79×10^{3} imp gal; 95×10^{3} US gal) tank and stand, boiler plant, water columns, 75-foot (23 m) diameter turntable replacing 60-foot (18 m) (1944), new Institute Building opened (1962), and new goods shed built (1964).

== Heritage listing ==
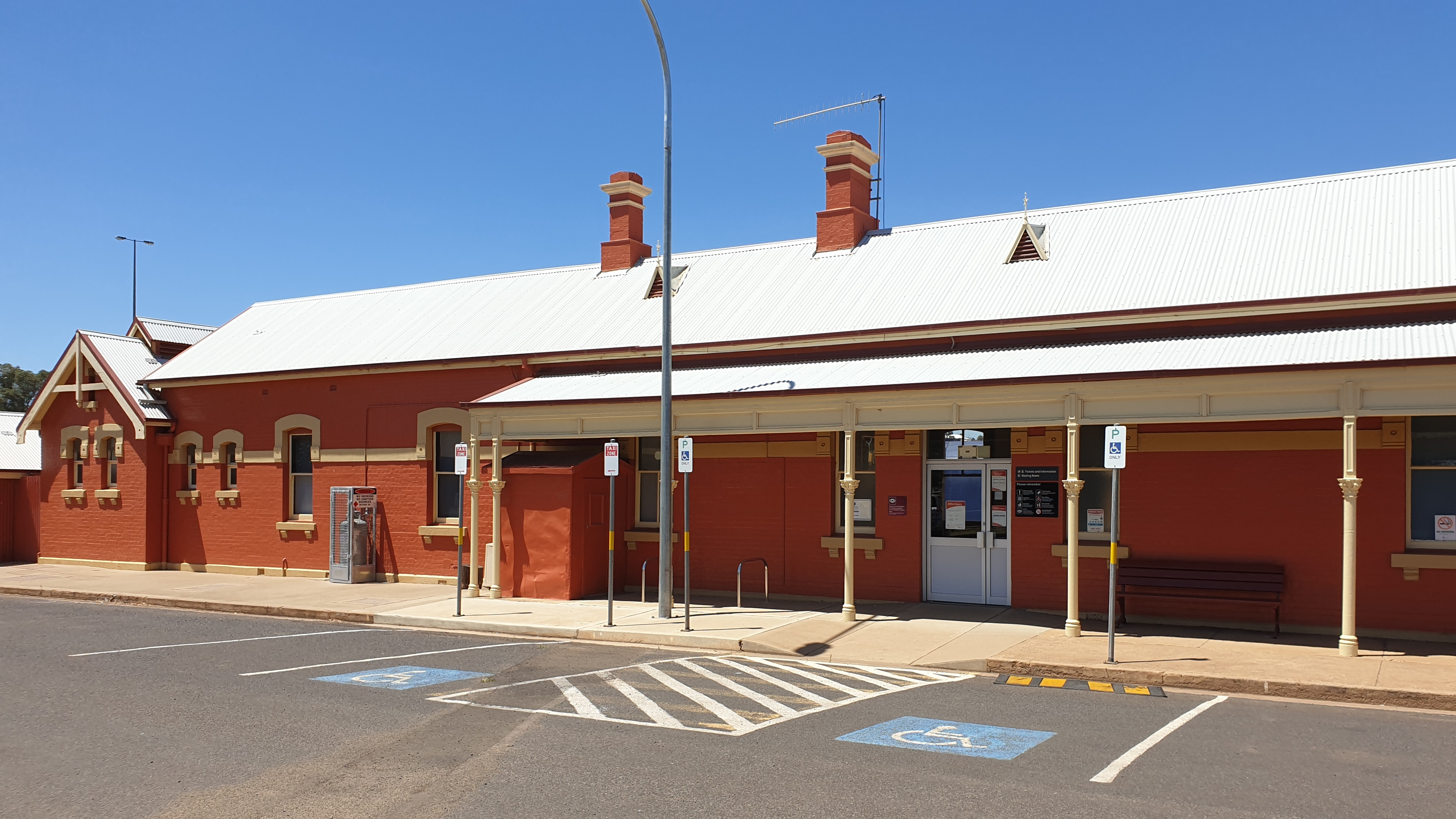
Exterior of Parkes railway station

As at 19 July 2013, Parkes Railway Precinct is of state significance as an important major railway junction that is associated with the earliest development of railway infrastructure in the west of NSW in the late 19th century. The precinct features a fine, albeit altered, example of a Victorian station building dating from the opening of the precinct in 1893. The precinct includes a locomotive depot with a partial roundhouse and remains of the former goods yard and a range of items typically found at many large railway complexes in NSW from the late 19th and 20th centuries including the footbridge, jib crane and dock platform, which all contribute to the significance of Parkes as a major railway junction. The Roundhouse is significant as only one of seven surviving structures. The footbridge is notable as the last riveted Warren truss footbridge constructed for the NSW network.

Parkes railway station was listed on the New South Wales State Heritage Register on 2 April 1999 having satisfied the following criteria.

The place is important in demonstrating the course, or pattern, of cultural or natural history in New South Wales.

The place has historic significance to demonstrate the late 19th and early 20th century development of the NSW railways as a major junction station that expanded in conjunction with the development of branch lines throughout western NSW. The station building dates from the opening of the line at Parkes in 1893, and along with other related structures has the ability to provide evidence of a late 19th century and early 20th century working railway precinct. The complex of related railway structures at Parkes are significant as evidence of a major junction station which continues to be a key station in the NSW network.

The place is important in demonstrating aesthetic characteristics and/or a high degree of creative or technical achievement in New South Wales.

The station building is a fine, albeit modified, example of a late Victorian station building with later sympathetic additions that retain the original Victorian character and detailing of the building. The adjoining railway refreshment room dating from 1928 is a good example of a large single storey refreshment room. The two buildings form a coherent group of related railway structures complemented by their large decorative platform awnings.

The place has a strong or special association with a particular community or cultural group in New South Wales for social, cultural or spiritual reasons.

The social significance of the place has not been formally assessed through community consultation but no specific strong or special social associations within the local community have been identified through the existing evidence.

The place has potential to yield information that will contribute to an understanding of the cultural or natural history of New South Wales.

No research values have been identified that are not readily found at other similar railway sites in NSW.

The place possesses uncommon, rare or endangered aspects of the cultural or natural history of New South Wales.

The site has rarity significance as the roundhouse is one of only seven similar structures in NSW, although better examples exist. The footbridge is notable as the last riveted Warren truss footbridge constructed on the NSW network.

The place is important in demonstrating the principal characteristics of a class of cultural or natural places/environments in New South Wales.

The site has representative significance for its collection of railway structures including the station building, railway refreshment rooms, signal box, footbridge, crane, locomotive depot and other related items that collectively demonstrate widespread 19th and early 20th century railway customs, activities and design in NSW, and are representative of similar items that are found at other railway sites in NSW.

== See also ==
List of regional railway stations in New South Wales
