= Amaroo railway station =

Former railway station in New South Wales, Australia

Coordinates: 33°10′54″S 148°55′04″E

Amaroo is a closed railway station on the Broken Hill railway line in New South Wales, Australia. The station opened in 1885 and closed in 1974. No trace now remains of the station.

Preceding station	Former services	Following station
Molong towards Broken Hill	Broken Hill Line	Borenore towards Orange
