= Borenore Caves =

Caves in New South Wales, Australia

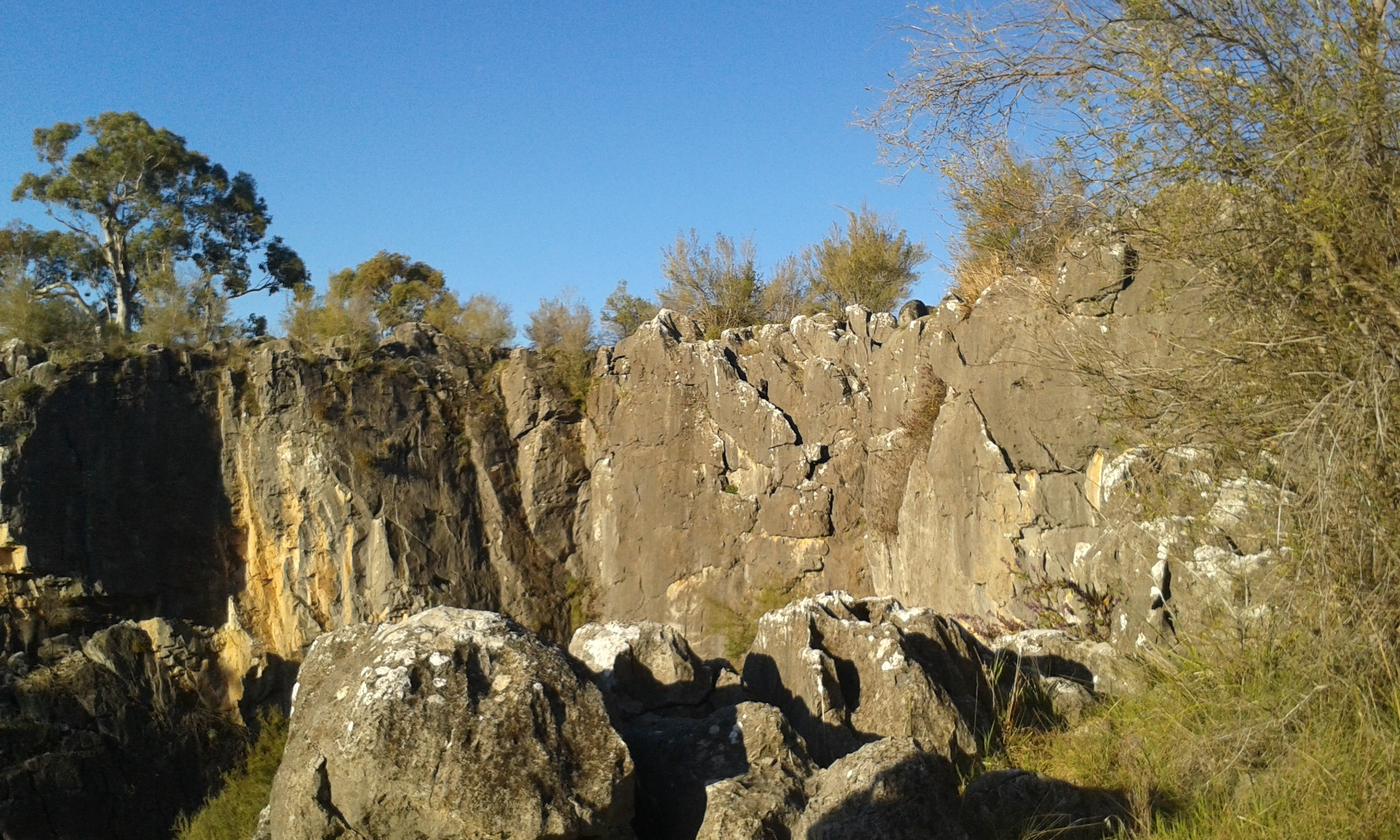
- Interactive map of Borenore Caves
- Location: Orange, New South Wales, Australia
- Discovery: 9,000 years ago – Wiradjuri; 1830 – John Henderson
- Geology: Limestone
- Access: Public; limited access May–October
- Lighting: Nil
- Features: Home to Eastern bent-winged bats

Borenore Karst Conservation Reserve
- IUCN category III (natural monument or feature)
- Location within New South Wales
- Location: New South Wales
- Nearest city: Orange
- Coordinates: 33°14′56″S 148°56′6″E
- Area: 1.36 km^{2} (0.53 sq mi)
- Established: December 1997
- Governing body: Jenolan Caves Reserve Trust; NSW National Parks & Wildlife Service
- Website: http://www.nationalparks.nsw.gov.au/Borenore-Karst-Conservation-Reserve

The Borenore Caves, contained within the Borenore Karst Conservation Reserve, are a series of limestone caves that are located in the Central West region of New South Wales, Australia. The caves are renowned for their karst qualities, namely the numerous fossils from a long-lived reef complex from the Silurian period. Fossils include corals, crinoids, brachiopods, gastropods, pentamerids, colonial tryplasmids and trilobites. Borenore's karst is surrounded by igneous rock that flowed from volcanic eruptions at nearby Mount Canobolas.

The 136-hectare (340-acre) reserve is situated 17 kilometres (11 mi) west of Orange, and is registered as a natural heritage site on the Register of the National Estate for its large diversity of karst morphological and sedimentological features. Camping in the reserve is not permitted.

== Features and location ==
Access is self-guided and suitable for casual visitors. Entry to the reserve is free.

The reserve contains over forty caves, including:

- Arch Cave
- Tunnel Cave – a long, dark passage, about 110 metres (360 ft) long, which emerges from the base of a large hill. The sink hole is about 30 metres (98 ft) higher than the entrance at the bottom of the hill. The Tunnel Cave is closed from May to October each year so that a colony of Eastern bent-winged bats, which hibernate there, are left undisturbed.
- Verandah Cave

== Mining ==
The caves are also notable as a source of Borenore Red marble early in the twentieth century, which was mined in the area until 1994. Borenore Red marble may be found in The Strand Arcade and in Buckingham Palace. Around 1898, while enjoying a picnic at Borenore, Peter Rusconi and his sons Joe and Frank Rusconi, monumental stonemasons from Italy, recognised the rich quality of the marble on the reserve. This marble was considered to be some of the best in the world and was mined for around thirty years. Examples of the famous Borenore red marble can be seen in Central Station, the Sydney GPO, the Commonwealth Trading Bank Building in Martin Place, and Jenolan Caves House as a mantelpiece.

== See also ==
- List of caves in New South Wales
- Protected areas of New South Wales
