= Stuart Town railway station =

Railway station in New South Wales, Australia

Stuart Town
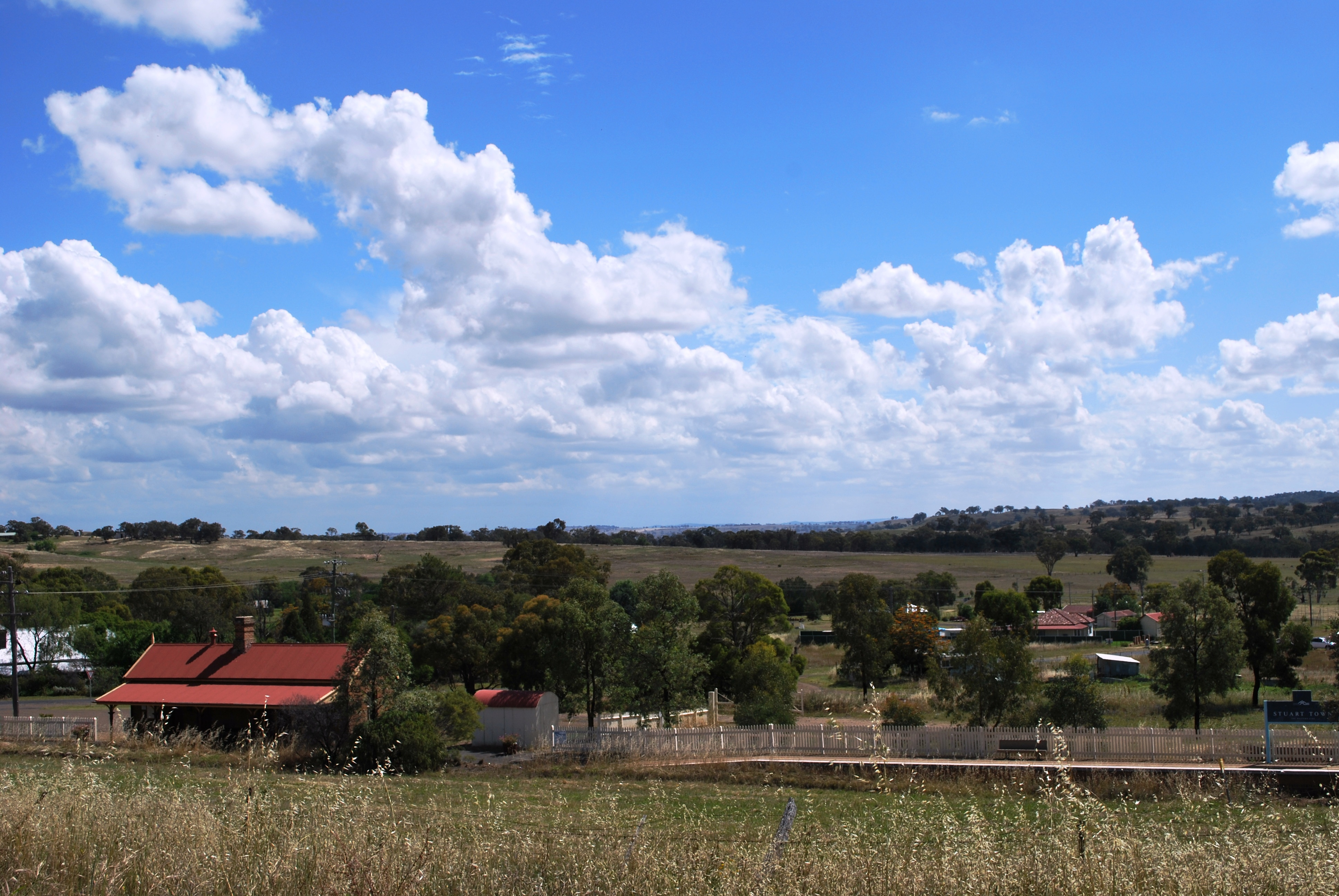
- Westbound view in November 2008

General information
- Location: Molong Street, Stuart Town; Australia
- Coordinates: 32°48′04″S 149°04′42″E
- Owner: Transport Asset Manager of New South Wales
- Operator: NSW TrainLink
- Line: Main Western
- Distance: 379.60 km (235.87 mi) from Central
- Platforms: 1
- Tracks: 2

Construction
- Structure type: Ground
- Accessible: Yes

Other information
- Status: Unstaffed
- Station code: SWN

History
- Opened: 1 June 1880

Services
| Preceding station | NSW TrainLink | Following station |
|---|---|---|
| Wellington towards Dubbo | NSW TrainLink Western Line Dubbo XPT | Orange towards Sydney |

New South Wales Heritage Register
- Official name: Stuart Town Railway Station group
- Type: State heritage (complex / group)
- Designated: 2 April 1999
- Reference no.: 1253
- Type: Railway Platform / Station
- Category: Transport – Rail
Location
- Location within New South Wales

Stuart Town railway station is a heritage-listed railway station located on the Main Western line in Stuart Town of New South Wales, Australia.

The station opened on 1 June 1880 when the line was extended from Orange to Wellington. It became unstaffed on 10 April 1976 and was made a request stop on 20 October 2024. It was added to the New South Wales State Heritage Register on 2 April 1999.

== Services ==
Stuart Town is served by NSW TrainLink's daily Central West XPT service operating between Sydney and Dubbo.

| Platform | Line | Stopping pattern | Notes |
| 1 | Western Region | services to Sydney Central & Dubbo | |

== Description ==
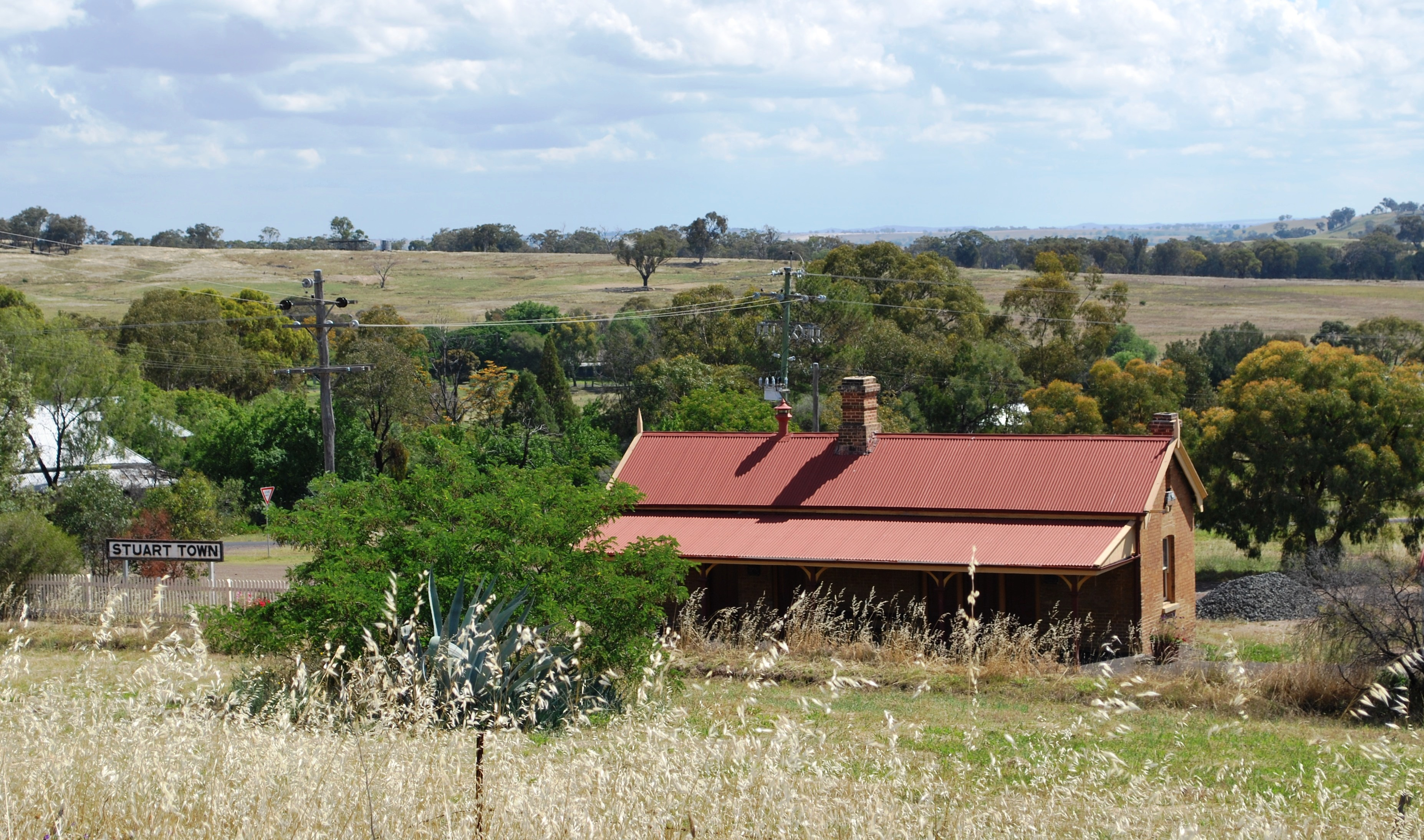
Stuart Town railway station, 2008

The station building is a type 4, brick third class building that was completed in 1880. A station master's residence is located adjacent to the station gatehouse, and is a type 5, brick building with a pyramid roof and central chimney, also completed in 1880. An out shed and lamp room/WC complete the complex.

The platform face is made of brick with a dock platform. A timber picket fence separates the platform from the adjacent car park.

== Heritage listing ==
Stuart Town is one of the best third class country stations on the NSW railway system. The station building is of high quality of an interesting entrance porch and the setting retains ancillary buildings, signs and platform seen throughout NSW. With Wellington, this station shows the early line through the area, which showed effort in railway construction by the substantial quality of the buildings.

Stuart Town railway station was listed on the New South Wales State Heritage Register on 2 April 1999. It satisfied the following criteria:

The place possesses uncommon, rare or endangered aspects of the cultural or natural history of New South Wales.

== See also ==
- Railway stations in New South Wales
