= Goonumbla =

- Town
- Coordinates: 32°56′0″S 148°14′32″E
- Country: Australia
- State: New South Wales
- LGA: Parkes Shire
- Location: 382 km (237 mi) WNW of Sydney; 97 km (60 mi) SW of Dubbo; 24 km (15 mi) N of Parkes

Government
  - State electorate: Dubbo
  - Federal division: Calare

Population
  - Total: 350 (2011 census)
- Postcode: 2870

Goonumbla is a bounded rural locality in Parkes Shire in the Central West region of New South Wales. Goonumbla is about 299km west-northwest of NSW's capital city of Sydney, and is on the Parkes–Narromine railway line. The population is about 320. The suburb of Alec town is to the east and Parkes township is 10 km to the south.

Goonumbla was first opened up during the Gold Rush, but has since become predominantly Agricultural in nature. The railway station has closed.
