= Stuart Town, New South Wales =

Stuart Town
- Town
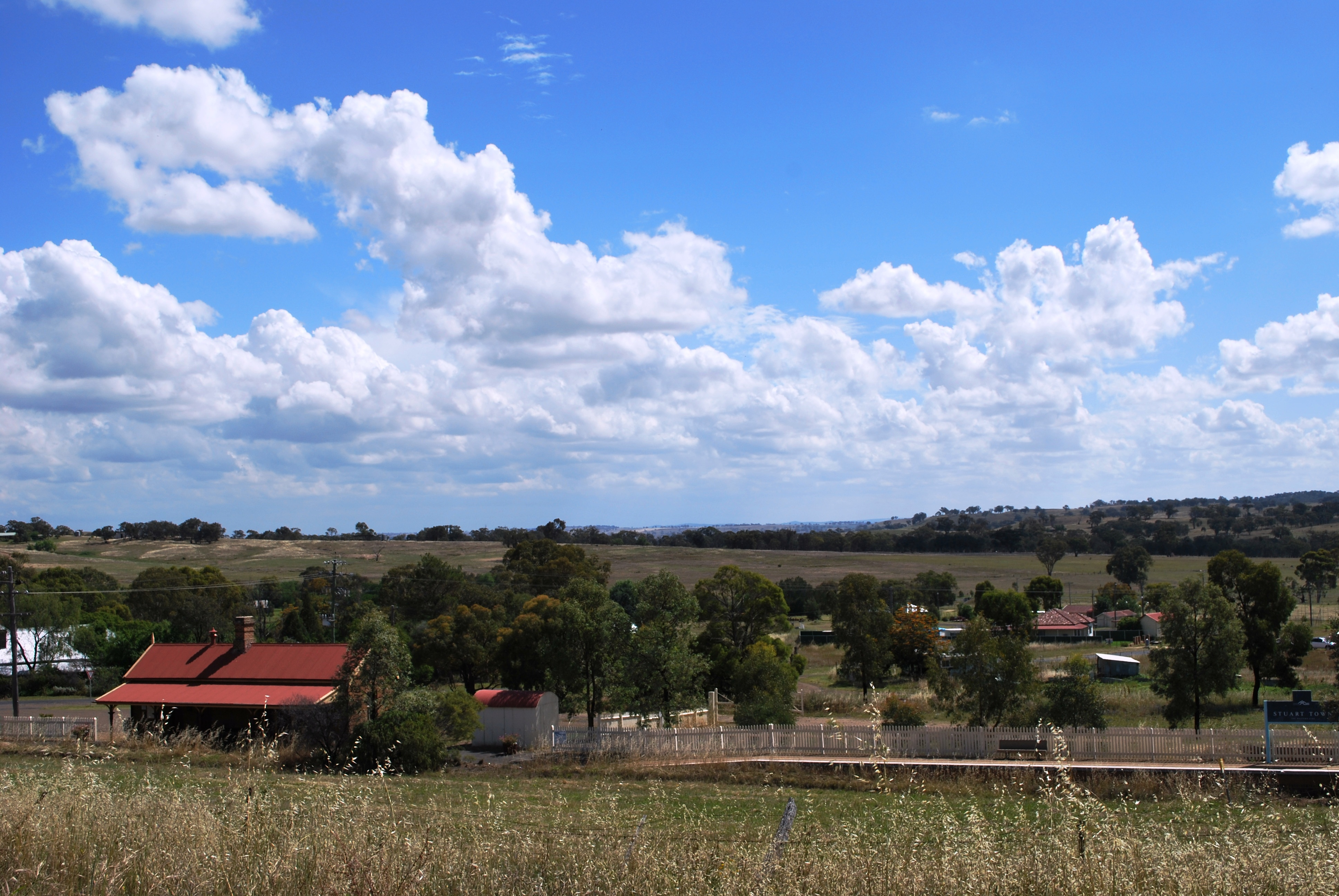
- Stuart Town, overlooking the railway station

- Coordinates: 32°48′0″S 149°05′0″E
- Country: Australia
- State: New South Wales
- LGA: Dubbo Regional Council
- Location: 317 km (197 mi) NW of Sydney; 60 km (37 mi) N of Orange; 35 km (22 mi) SE of Wellington; 84 km (52 mi) SE of Dubbo

Government
  - State electorate: Dubbo
  - Federal division: Parkes
- Elevation: 548 m (1,798 ft)

Population
  - Total: 487 (2011 census)
- Postcode: 2820

Stuart Town, formerly known as Ironbark, is a small town on the Central Western Slopes of New South Wales, Australia within Dubbo Regional Council. It is located 317 kilometres (197 mi) north-west of the state capital, Sydney. At the 2011 census, Stuart Town had a population of 487. The area around the town is rich in cattle farming and orchards, so the town serves as a service centre to that area.

It has a public school and Catholic and Anglican churches.

== History ==
The area now known as Stuart Town lies within the traditional lands of the Wiradjuri people.

The village was formerly called Ironbark and was established following the discovery of gold in the area in the early 1850s with the heyday of gold mining being in the late 1850s and 1860s, including numerous Chinese goldseekers. The gold attracted bushrangers to the area.

It was renamed Stuart Town in 1879—with the arrival of the Main Western railway from Sydney—after Sir Alexander Stuart.

Gold mining in the area was revived, from 1899 and during first decade of the 20th century, when gold dredge mining of the nearby Macquarie River bed and sediments was carried out.

It has benefitted from its proximity to Lake Burrendong.

Stuart Town is often claimed to be the birthplace of the former New South Wales Premier Sir Robert Askin. In fact, he was born at Glebe in Sydney, but he did spend much of his childhood at Stuart Town.

Its original name, Ironbark, is used in the Banjo Paterson poem "The Man from Ironbark". It conducts an annual Man from Ironbark Festival.

== Heritage listings ==
Stuart Town has a number of heritage-listed sites, including:

- Main Western railway: Stuart Town railway station

== Transport ==
Stuart Town station is served by a daily NSW TrainLink XPT service which runs between Sydney and Dubbo.
