= Nanardine railway station =

Railway station in New South Wales, Australia

Nanardine

General information
- Coordinates: 33.0616°S 148.1142°E
- Owner: Public Transport Commission
- Operator: Public Transport Commission
- Line: Parkes–Narromine
- Distance: 457.9 kilometres from Central
- Platforms: 1
- Tracks: 1

Construction
- Structure type: Ground

Other information
- Status: Demolished

History
- Opened: 30 September 1914
- Closed: 5 June 1976
Route map
Location

Nanardine railway station was a railway station on the Parkes–Narromine line. The station opened on 30 September 1914 and closed on 5 June 1976. It featured a goods loading bank. No trace of Nanardine station remains.

The line is owned by the Rail Infrastructure Corporation of New South Wales, but is managed and maintained by the Australian Rail Track Corporation under a 60-year lease signed in 2004.
