= Canobolas railway station =

Former railway station in New South Wales, Australia

Canobolas

General information
- Location: Canobolas Road, Orange; New South Wales; Australia
- Coordinates: 33°17′40″S 149°03′54″E
- Line: Broken Hill
- Distance: 327.290 km (203.369 mi) from Central
- Platforms: 1 (1 side)

Construction
- Structure type: Ground

Other information
- Status: Closed

History
- Former names: Orange Racecourse (unknown–1913)

Services
Preceding station	Former services	Following station
Borenore towards Broken Hill	Broken Hill Line	Orange East Fork towards Orange
Location

Canobolas railway station was a regional railway station on the Broken Hill railway line, located in the Central Tablelands city of Orange.

== History ==
Canobolas station was opened as Orange Racecourse as it served the Towac Park Racecourse. It was renamed Canobolas on 1 June 1913, and was closed at a later date. The station building survives as a private residence.
