= Jenolan Caves House =

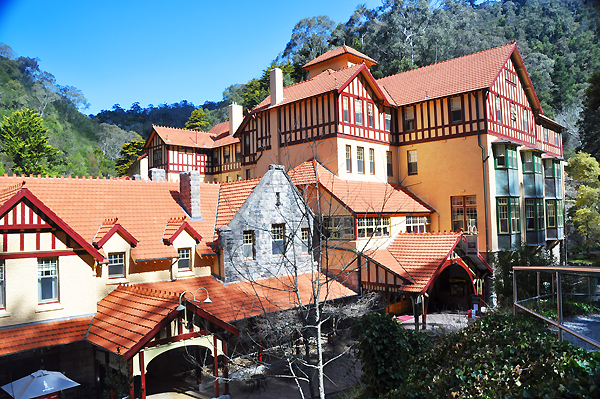
- The Caves House

- Location within New South Wales

General information
- Status: Completed
- Type: Hotel
- Architectural style: Federation Arts & Crafts
- Location: Caves Road, Jenolan, Oberon, New South Wales, Australia
- Coordinates: 33°49′10″S 150°01′16″E
- Construction started: 1879
- Completed: 1926

Technical details
- Floor count: 4

Design and construction
- Architects: Jeremiah Wilson (since rebuilt); Walter Liberty Vernon; George McRae
- Architecture firm: New South Wales Government Architect

New South Wales Heritage Register
- Official name: Jenolan Caves Reserve
- Type: Landscape
- Criteria: a., b., c., d., e., f.
- Designated: 25 June 2004
- Reference no.: 01698

The Jenolan Caves House is a large, heritage-listed hotel, built in stages between 1879 and 1926. It is located in the remote Jenolan Caves Karst Conservation Reserve, Blue Mountains National Park, on the western edge of the Blue Mountains UNESCO World Heritage Area, in New South Wales, Australia.

The building was designed in the Government Architect's Branch of the New South Wales Public Works Department, under the supervision of Colonel Walter Liberty Vernon (1846–1914). The four-storey complex was designed in the Federation Arts & Crafts style, of which Vernon was an advocate. Parts of the building show the influence of the 'Sussex Wealdon' style, in particular the half timbered upper facades of the later sections. The building is characterized by gables, tile roof and deep recessed openings with multi-paned windows. The building was constructed to provide accommodation for visitors to Jenolan Caves (previously known as Binda Caves or Fish River Caves), one of Australia's most extensive limestone cave systems (karsts) that is open to the public.

== Early development by Jeremiah Wilson ==
Although long known to local Aboriginal people, Jenolan Caves was not discovered by European settlers until the early 1800s. The area was declared a protected reserve for tourist purposes in 1866. A local farmer, Jeremiah Wilson, was appointed 'Keeper of the Caves' in 1867. Visitors would write to Wilson advising him of their intention to view the caves. Meeting them at Tarana railway station, he would convey them by horse-drawn vehicle, 54 kilometres (34 mi), through Oberon, and then walk them down the last five kilometres (three point one miles) into the Jenolan Valley, because the descent was too steep for a vehicle. In an early Jenolan Caves guide book, the difficulties posed by the remote location were summed up as follows:

"The want of good roads, and the dangers of these perpendicular mountains, also the great want of an accommodation house, mitigated for years against this district becoming a popular place for tourists, or a holiday resort. At the time, all provisions had to be carried there by the visitors, and it was necessary to camp and sleep on the rocks under the Grand Arch."

— J. J. Foster, 1890.

In 1879, Wilson built a small kitchen building. The following years, he was able to erect a single-storey, wooden building, roofed with corrugated iron. This first 'Caves House' contained 5 bedrooms and a large dining room. The kitchen remained separate, in case of fire - a common risk at the time. In 1886, the fee for an overnight stay was only 2 shillings ('1st Class') or 1 shilling ('2nd Class'). A horse could be stabled for 6 to 8 shillings per day. Or it could graze in the adjacent paddock for sixpence per day.

In 1887, Wilson erected a two-storey wooden building, catering for 30 visitors, and characterised by deep verandahs around three sides of both levels. That year, New South Wales Governor Charles Wynn-Carington, 1st Marquess of Lincolnshire, and his wife, rode 45 kilometres (28 mi) on the new Six Foot Track from Katoomba, staying two nights in this early Caves House building.

During 1888, there were 1,829 visitors, making further accommodation necessary. In 1890 Wilson demolished the original small kitchen. In its place, he erected a two-storey wooden building, alongside the original main building, in the same style as the 1887 building, with deep verandahs on both levels. By then, reflecting the more comfortable accommodation, tariffs had risen considerably to 10 shillings per day for adults and 5 shillings per day for children and servants, with 'cave costumes' available for hire.

A new road from Katoomba, via Hartley, offered a more direct route, with travelers alighting at Mount Victoria railway station. The horse-drawn coach cost 30 shillings one way or 40 shillings return; meaning that a visit to the caves and a stay in Caves House was still out of the economic reach of the ordinary person. In February 1895 Prince Francis Joseph of Battenberg stayed the night at Jenolan Caves House and inspected the caves.

The following month a fire destroyed the 1888 building, as well as the earliest accommodation house, kitchen, billiard room and two dining rooms.

== Subsequent developments ==
In 1896 Walter Liberty Vernon was engaged to design a new Caves House, adjoining the 1887 building (which had survived the fire) on the footprint of the original building that was destroyed in the fire. Joseph Henry Maiden, the Director of the Royal Botanic Gardens, remodeled and terraced the slopes around Caves House, providing a setting of park-like gardens. The improvements cost the NSW Government A£30,000. The new two-storey building held a dining room for 60 guests, a billiard room, accommodation for 50 and the latest kitchen and bathroom innovations. It was built from the 430 million years old Silurian limestone quarried on site at Jenolan. This building is now known as the 'Vernon Wing'.

In 1906, the two-storey, verandah-wrapped, wooden building, which Wilson had built in 1887, was demolished. In its place, in 1907, a second wing was added, perpendicular to the 'Vernon Wing'. This new two-storey wing was also designed by Vernon, but supervised by his successor, George McRae. It contained sitting rooms, dining rooms and 26 guestrooms. It was also made of local limestone and roofed with red, French tiles.

In 1916, a massive four-storey (41-metre-long (133 ft)) wing was completed by McRae, from plans designed by Vernon before his death. This wing provided 60 extra guestrooms, lift, dining room and large kitchen. In 1926, the four-storey wing was further extended, adding further guestrooms and, in particular, expanding the dining room. This extension cost £6,937 and was built by W. J. Bailey of Oberon.

== Historical points of interest ==
Newspaper articles from 1917 to 1947 describe the popularity of Jenolan Caves House after The Great War, producing meat and vegetables from its own farms nearby. Australia's youngest recipient of the Victoria Cross medal, Private John Jackson, spent Christmas 1918 there. In 1919, a deluge completely submerged the ground floor. During the Spanish Influenza pandemic of 1919, Caves House was closed for several weeks and used as a convalescent home for nurses who had become infected. In January 1926, highly decorated British Field Marshal Edmund Henry Hynman Allenby, 1st Viscount Allenby and his wife stayed overnight at Jenolan Caves House. In 1927, England's Prince Albert Duke of York and his wife, Lady Elizabeth Bowes Lyon, Duchess of York (later King George VI and Queen Elizabeth The Queen Mother) stayed overnight at Caves House. In 1942, Caves House was nearly forced to close, due to war time transport problems. However, 1946 saw a travel boom, during which the facility accommodated 32,500 guests.

== Heritage listing ==
On 25 June 2004 Jenolan Caves House (along with the caves) was listed on the NSW State Heritage Register, having been identified as meeting a range of standards - historical, associative, aesthetic, social, research potential and rarity - which make it significant for past, present or future generations.

Aesthetically, the appearance of Caves House, with its roots in English provincial building practice, is a contrast to the mountainous landscape of the remote Jenolan Valley, its massive limestone arches and craggy cliffs. As the building is the work of a prominent colonial architect, who was influential in the development of Australian architecture, Caves House attains significance by association. Historically, Caves House illustrates the considerable human activity and ingenuity necessary to provide accommodation in the early days of Australian tourism, in buildings especially designed for this purpose. Vernon had to employ innovative methods to address problems posed by a major building project in a remote setting. Also, Caves House was built to service one of the earliest protected sites of natural environmental heritage in the world, declared a protected area by the New South Wales government in 1866. Lighting and sewage developments dating from the late 1880s are of significant historical importance, as they were crucial to the development of the remote area as a tourist destination. Caves House has the research potential to provide archaeological evidence about the early development of New South Wales tourism. Along with the caves, it is a rare example of the development of mountain and cave tourism in New South Wales. Also, of historical significance is the fact that in 1889, to provide electricity for the caves (and later, Caves House) Australia's first hydro-electricity plant was built nearby.

Socially, it is significant that, initially built for the wealthy, Caves House became much more accessible over the years, especially after public motor transport became widely available, exemplifying the growth of social homogeneity in Australia.

Today, Caves House still operates as a hotel, with café, bar, function rooms and restaurant. Members of the public can stay there or wander through the large public rooms, which retain much of their Edwardian ambiance.

== Gallery ==
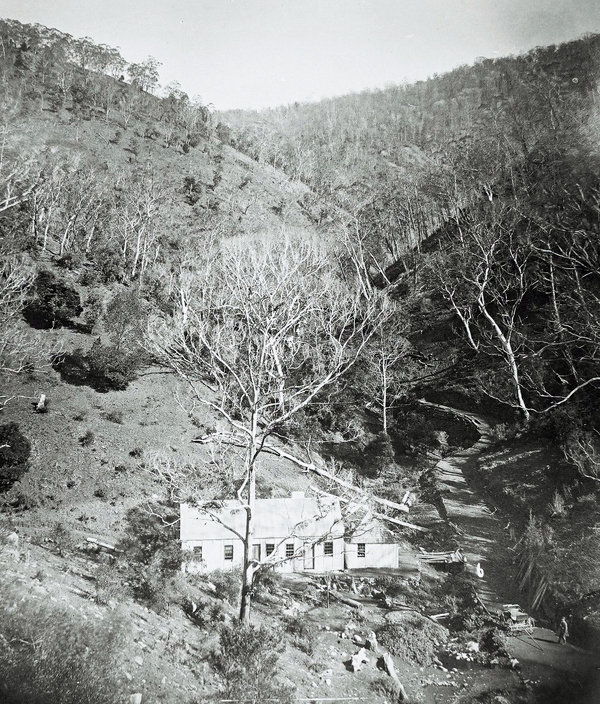
Jenolan Caves' earliest accommodation was begun by Jeremiah Wilson in 1879.

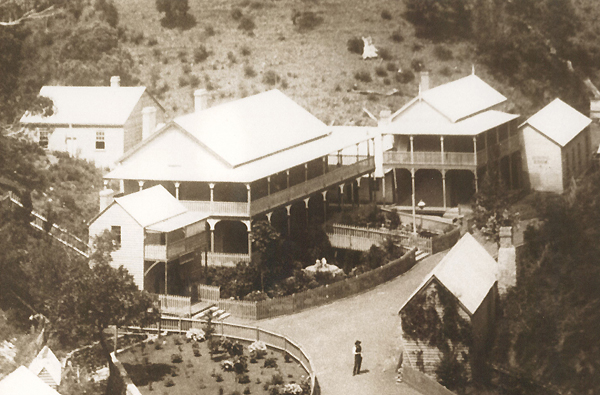
Wilson built the large 2-storey building with verandah in 1887 and the smaller 2-storey building, on its right, in 1890.

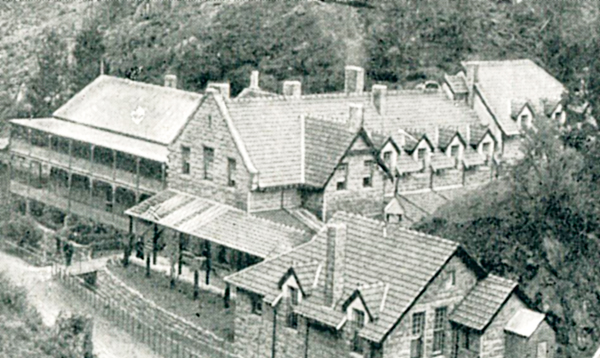
In 1897, Walter Vernon built a 2-storey limestone building next to Wilson's 1887 wooden building.

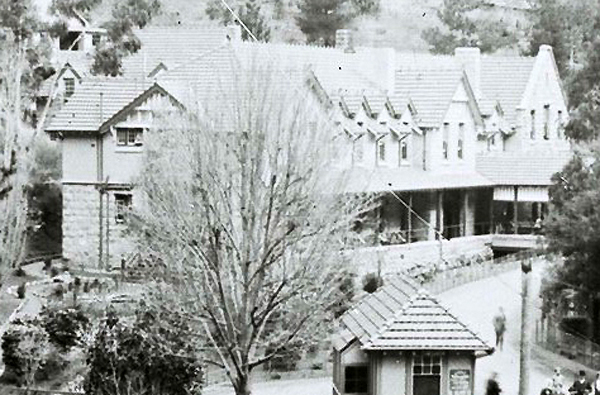
In 1906, McRae replaced Wilson's building, joining it to Vernon's.

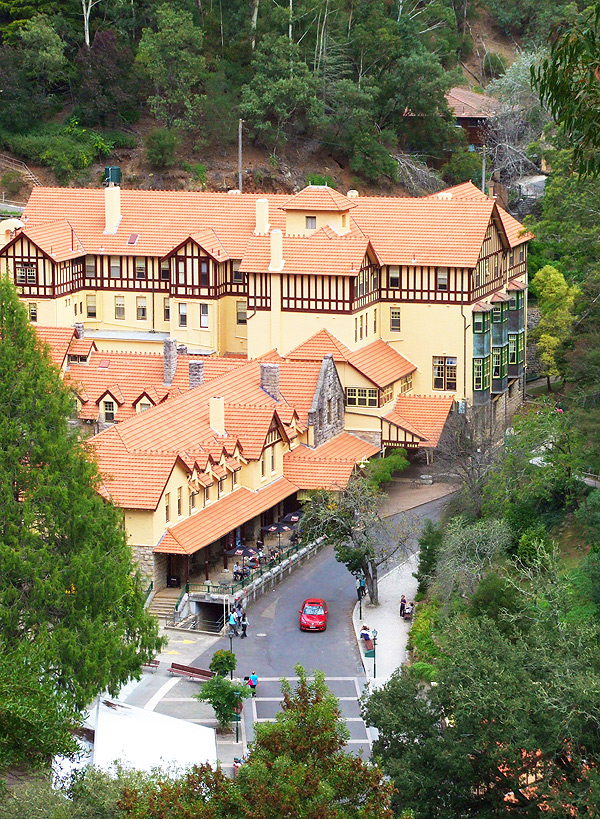
In 1916, a massive four-storey extension was built.

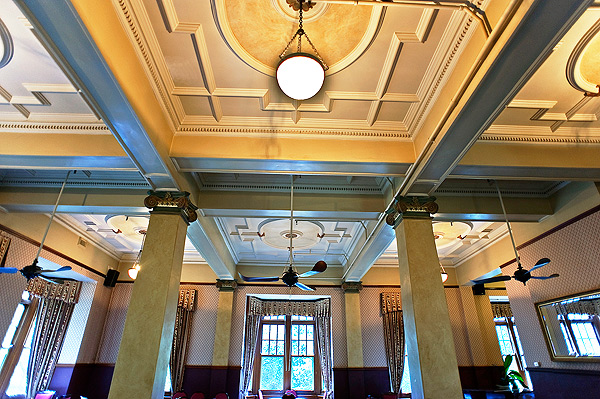
Decorative ceilings, columns and bay windows have been preserved in the grand dining room, finished in 1926.

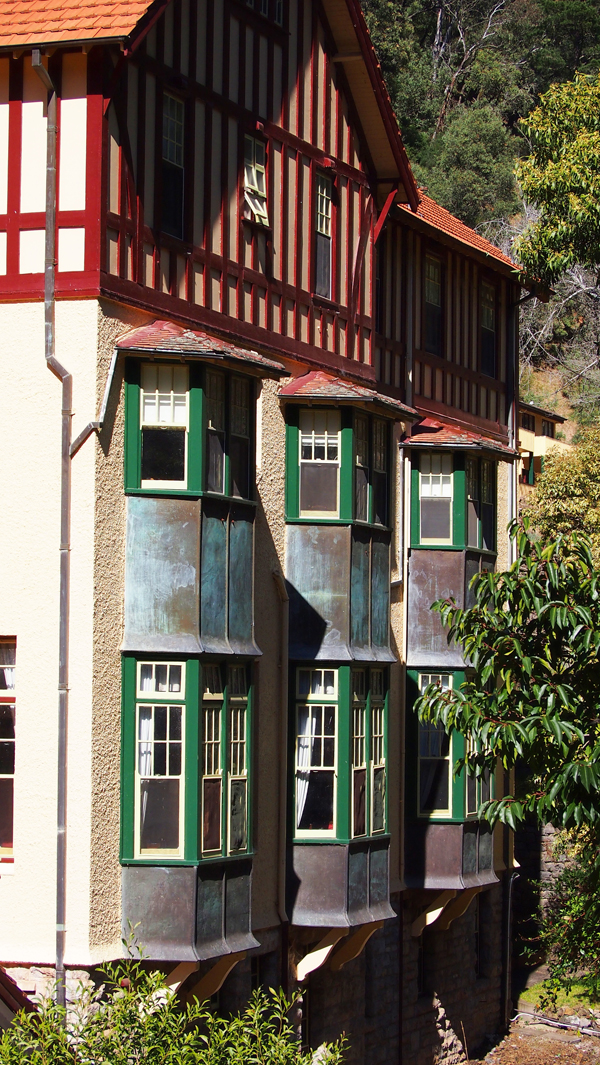
Copper bay windows are a main feature of the 1916 and 1926 extensions.
