= Parkes–Narromine railway line =

Railway line New South Wales, Australia

Overview
- Status: Operational
- Owner: Rail Infrastructure Corporation
- Termini: Parkes; Narromine

Service
- Type: Heavy rail (freight)
- Operator(s): Australian Rail Track Corporation

Technical
- Line length: 106 km (66 mi)
- Number of tracks: 1
- Track gauge: 1,435 mm (4 ft 8 1/2 in) standard gauge

The Parkes–Narromine railway line is a railway line in New South Wales, Australia. The line forms part of a cross-country route between Cootamundra on the Main South line and Werris Creek on the Main North line. It is owned by the Rail Infrastructure Corporation of New South Wales, but is managed and maintained by the Australian Rail Track Corporation under a 60-year lease signed in 2004. The line is used mainly for grain haulage, with several silo facilities located along the line. Passenger services ceased in the mid-1970s and there are no surviving passenger stations on the line. The station building at Peak Hill has been relocated to a nearby sportsground.

As part of the Inland Rail project, between December 2018 and September 2020 the line was closed for upgrade works. Three new crossing loops were installed at Goonumbla, Peak Hill and Timjelly, along with a new connection to the Broken Hill railway line near Parkes to allow trains accessing Adelaide and Perth.

== See also ==
- Rail transport in New South Wales
