= Orange railway station, New South Wales =

Railway station in New South Wales, Australia

Orange
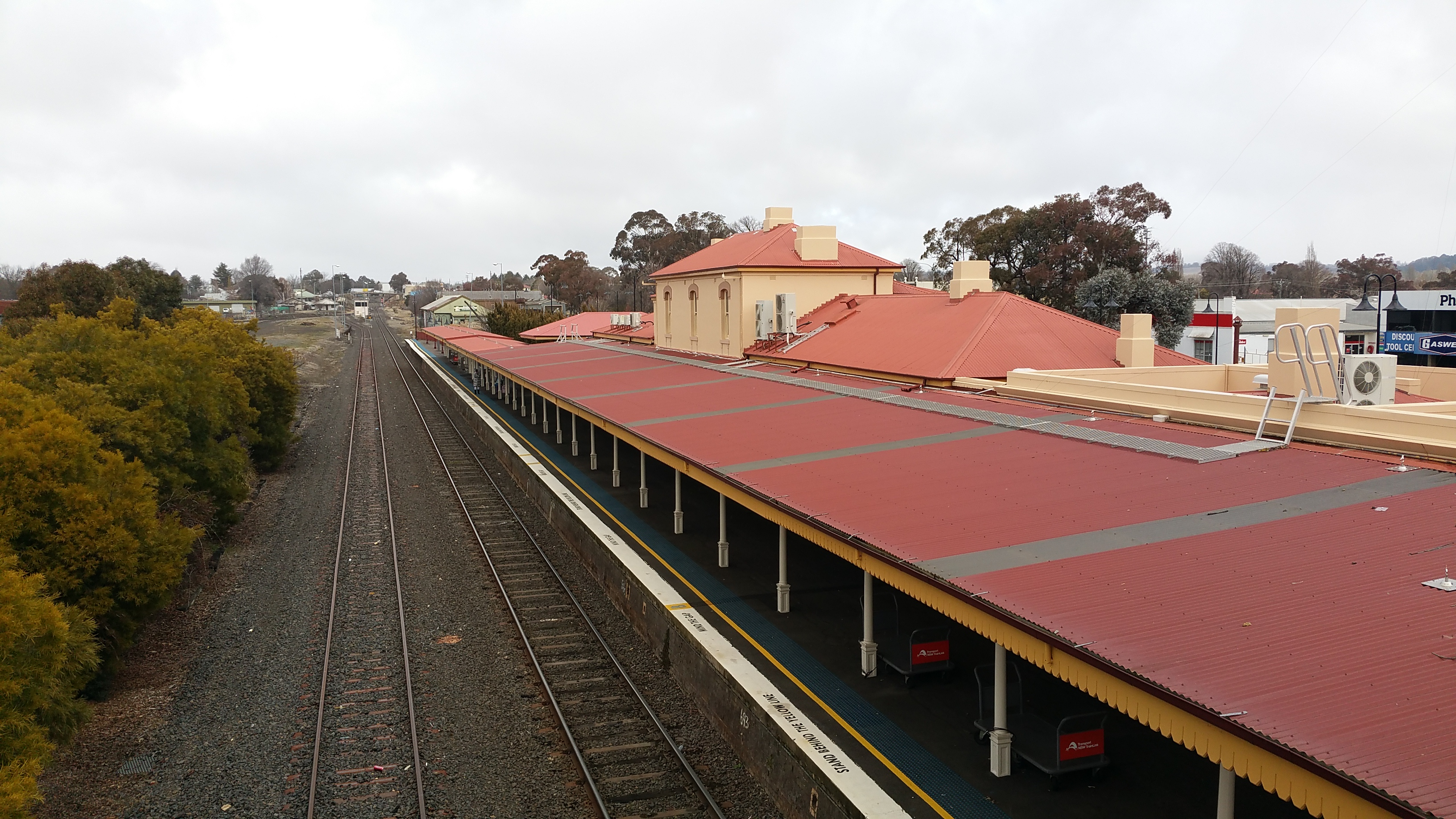
- View from the footbridge in August 2018

General information
- Location: Peisley Street, Orange, New South Wales; Australia
- Coordinates: 33°17′12″S 149°06′13″E
- Owner: Transport Asset Manager of New South Wales
- Operator: NSW TrainLink
- Line: Main Western
- Distance: 322.6 km (200.5 mi) from Sydney Central
- Platforms: 1
- Tracks: 3

Construction
- Structure type: Ground
- Accessible: Yes

Other information
- Station code: OAG

History
- Opened: 19 April 1877

Services
Preceding station	NSW TrainLink	Following station
Parkes towards Broken Hill	NSW TrainLink Western Line Broken Hill Outback Xplorer	Blayney towards Sydney
Stuart Town towards Dubbo	NSW TrainLink Western Line Dubbo XPT	Millthorpe towards Sydney
Former services
Preceding station	Former services	Following station
Orange Showground towards Bourke	Main Western Line	Bloomfield towards Sydney
Canobolas towards Broken Hill	Broken Hill Line	Terminus

New South Wales Heritage Register
- Official name: Orange Railway Station and yard group
- Type: State heritage (complex / group)
- Designated: 2 April 1999
- Reference no.: 1218
- Type: Railway Platform / Station
- Category: Transport – Rail
Location

Orange railway station is a heritage-listed former railway bridge and now railway station located on the Main Western line on Paisley Street, Orange in New South Wales, Australia. It was built from 1877 to 1950. It is also known as Orange Railway Station and yard group. The property was added to the New South Wales State Heritage Register on 2 April 1999.

The station serves the city of Orange and opened on 19 April 1877 when the line was extended from Blayney. It served as the terminus of the line until it was extended to Wellington on 1 June 1880. A disused bay platform is located at the southern end.

== History ==
Orange is located on the Main Western line. The single line railway from Blayney to Orange was opened on 19 April 1877. The line was duplicated from Spring Hill to Orange on 5 November 1916.

In 1874, a contract was awarded for construction of the line from Bathurst to Orange and in 1876 a contract let for construction of a combined station/ residence building, goods shed and station verandah at Orange. The design for the new station building/residence was finalised in 1876 and the building completed the following year, being officially opened on 19 April 1877. A Guards' rest house was also provided in 1877, and in 1885 a branch line was opened from Orange East Fork to Molong.

In the year of the railways' arrival to Orange, 8,160 hectares (20,170 acres) of land was under cultivation, wheat being the primary crop. It was the wheat farmer, therefore, that stood to benefit most from the opening of the line. Accordingly, the initial planning of the precinct included a goods shed, which still stands today, for the loading of Orange grown grains onto rail trucks destined for Sydney markets. The original goods shed was much longer than it is today, extending northward almost to the end of the railway station platform, where the carpark is now, and utilizing the jib crane.

The original 1875 plans for the station arrangement for Orange show that the Orange precinct was intended to service more than just passenger trains. The precinct included a depot and carriage shed with a turntable opposite the railway station and goods shed. The depot was subsequently moved in 1937 to East Fork and the area was converted for use as a marshalling yard.

The 1930s saw significant developments to the rail infrastructure at Orange. With the Railway Institute already established, it was announced in 1936 that the new headquarters for the District Superintendent of Railways was to be constructed next to the station on the north-western side. As the town of Orange grew, the rail activities at Orange were being divided between the station in town and the depot at East Fork and accordingly the coal shed (perhaps only a coal dump or an elevated loading facility) and engine shed were relocated from an area opposite the station to East Fork in 1937.

In 1938, a signal box was added to the precinct, south of the goods shed and in-between the bifurcated main line and the lines of the marshalling area. The construction of the signal box represented the modernization of the 19th century railway station and yard and a new mechanized system of signalling to better cope with the increased number of trains travelling through Orange.

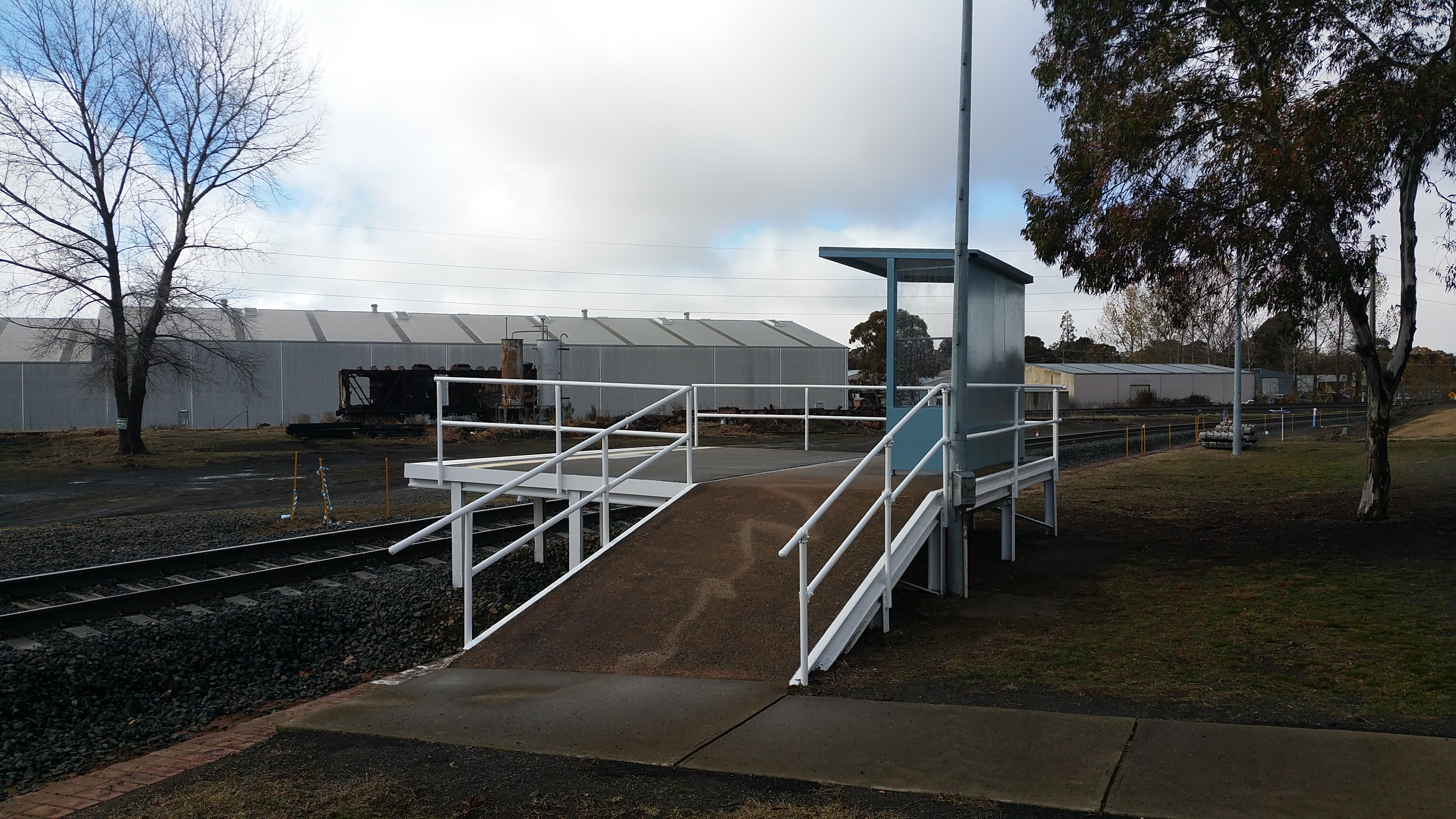
Orange East Fork Station

Over time, the arrangement of the rail precinct at Orange has changed as a result of the development of Orange as a major regional centre, and due to changes in railway technology and practices. Once the rail head moved on from Orange in 1880 and the railways continued into far western NSW, Orange turned to the production of fruit, finding it increasingly difficult to compete with the wheat production in the drier climate wheat districts. The production of grain in the Orange district in the 19th century was replaced to a large extent with fruit by the 1950s. A reflection of this change was the construction of the Orange Producers Rural Association (OPR) transhipment shed (c. 1959) within the Orange railway precinct.

Other additions and alterations within the Orange railway station and yard included the installation of a gantry crane (1896), erection of a carriage shed (1897), extension of the awning over the station platform (1898), alterations to station buildings (1918), provision of a wheat stacking site in the triangle (1918), construction of institute building (1921), new stockyards (1935), and at least one new rest house for Loco staff (1939).

== Services ==
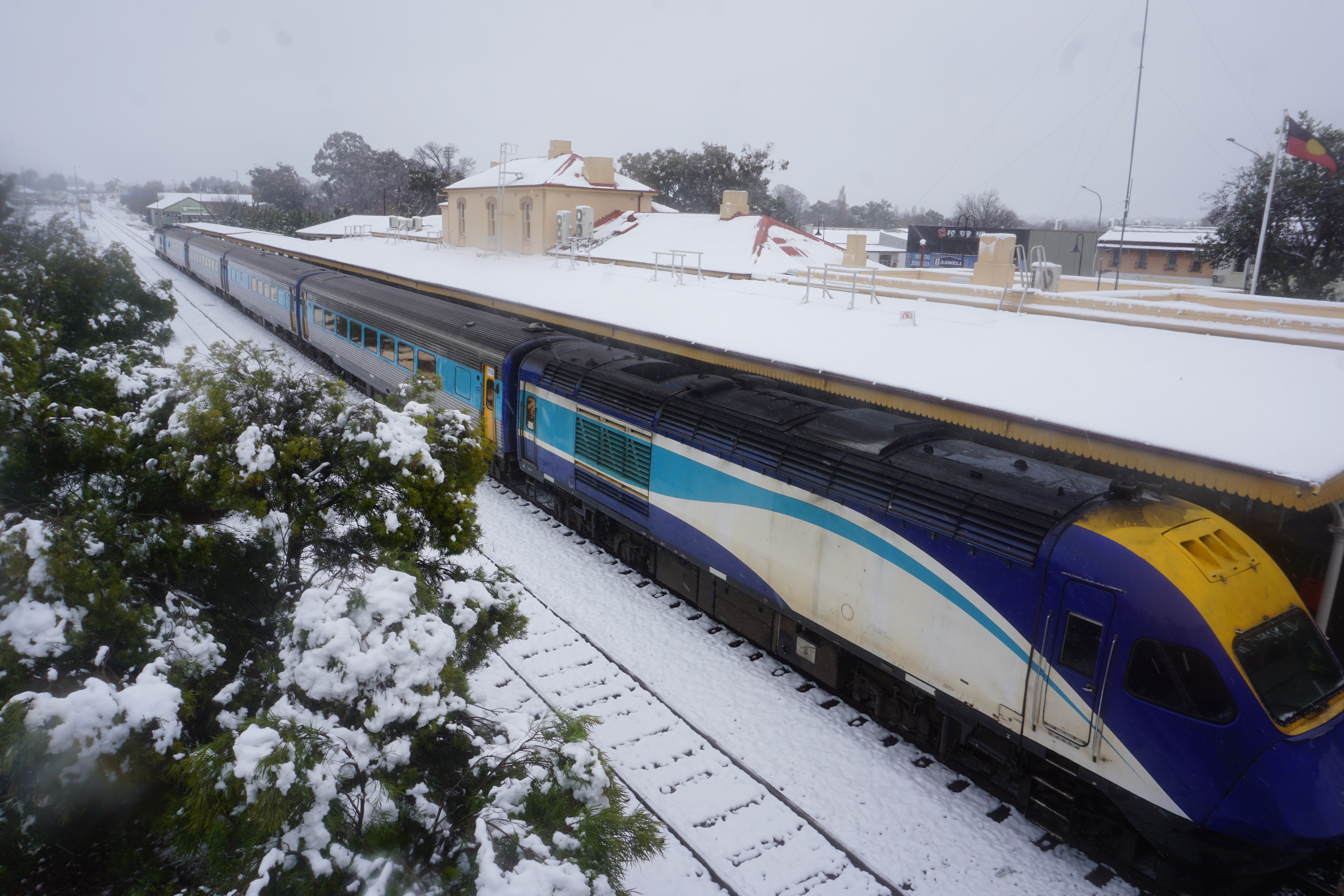
An XPT service towards Dubbo

Orange is served by NSW TrainLink's daily Central West XPT service operating between Sydney and Dubbo and the weekly Outback Xplorer between Sydney and Broken Hill.

NSW TrainLink road coach services operating between Lithgow, Dubbo and Nyngan also serve the station.

About two kilometres (one point two miles) south of the station, the Broken Hill line branches off. A platform known as Orange East Fork lies at the rail junction and was served by the Indian Pacific until 2017. The Outback Xplorer uses Orange station and reverses back to the junction before continuing to its destination.

Platform	Line	Stopping pattern	Notes
1	Western Region	services to Sydney Central, Dubbo, Broken Hill	

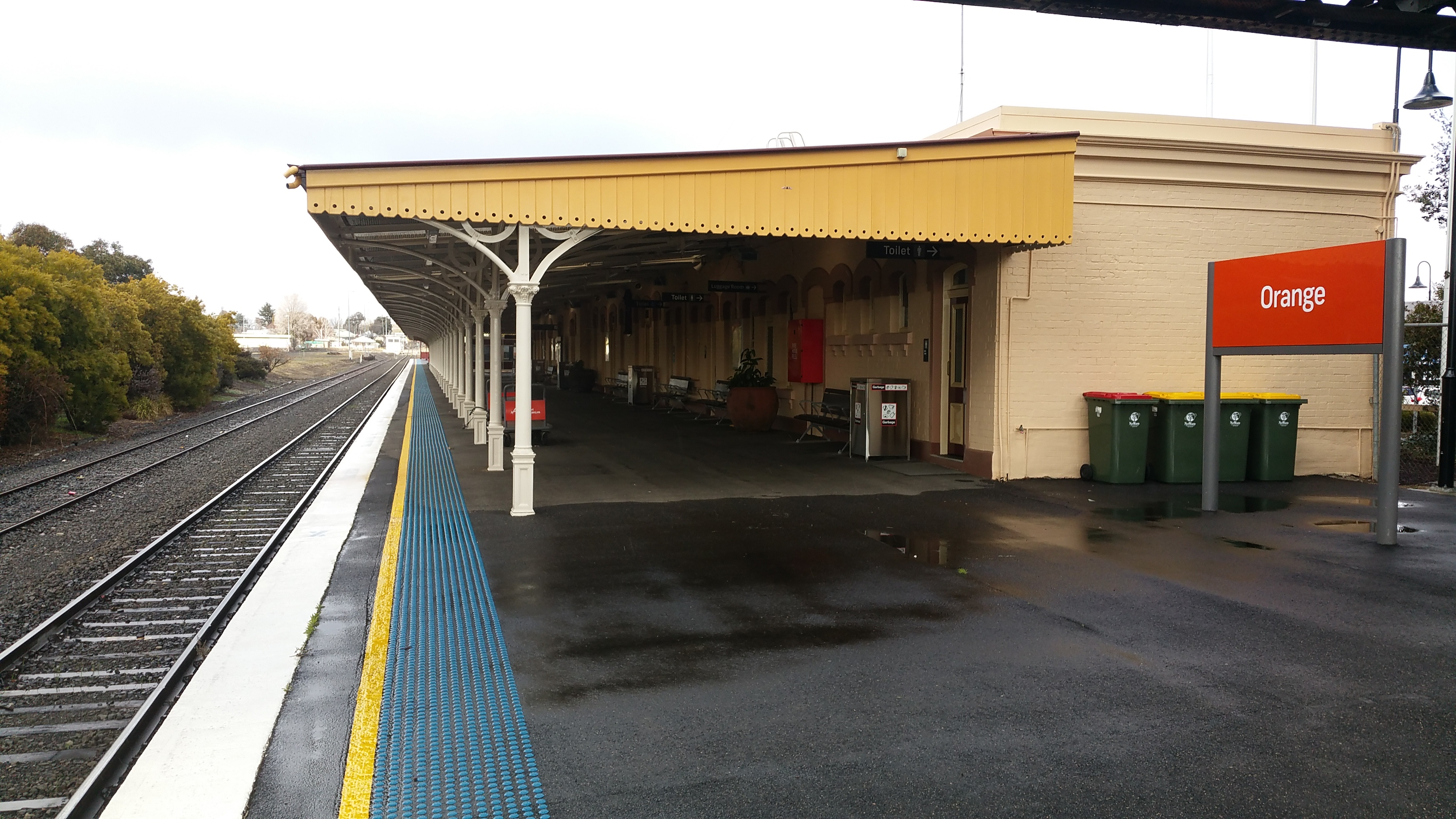
Southbound view on platform

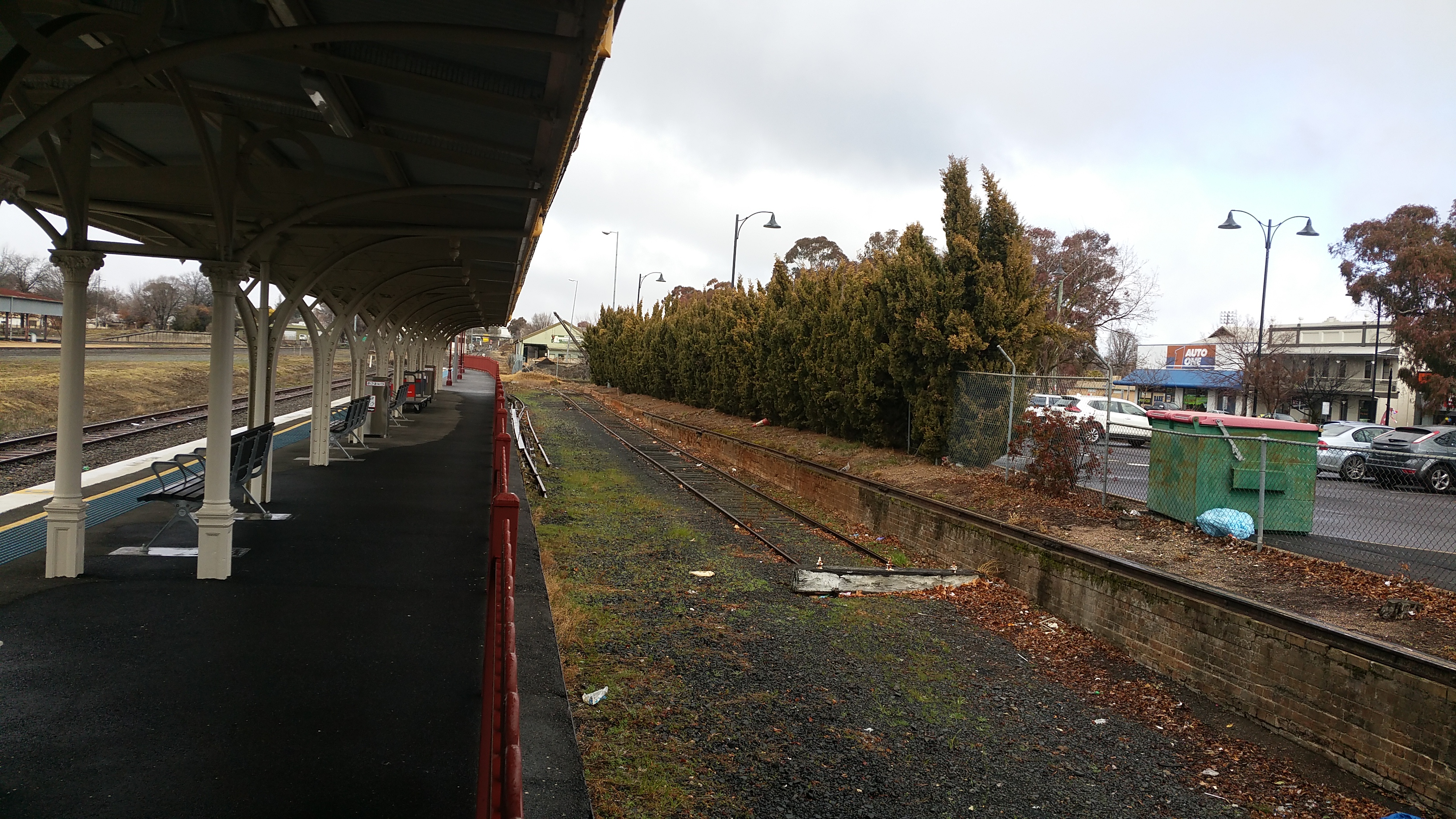
The former terminating platform

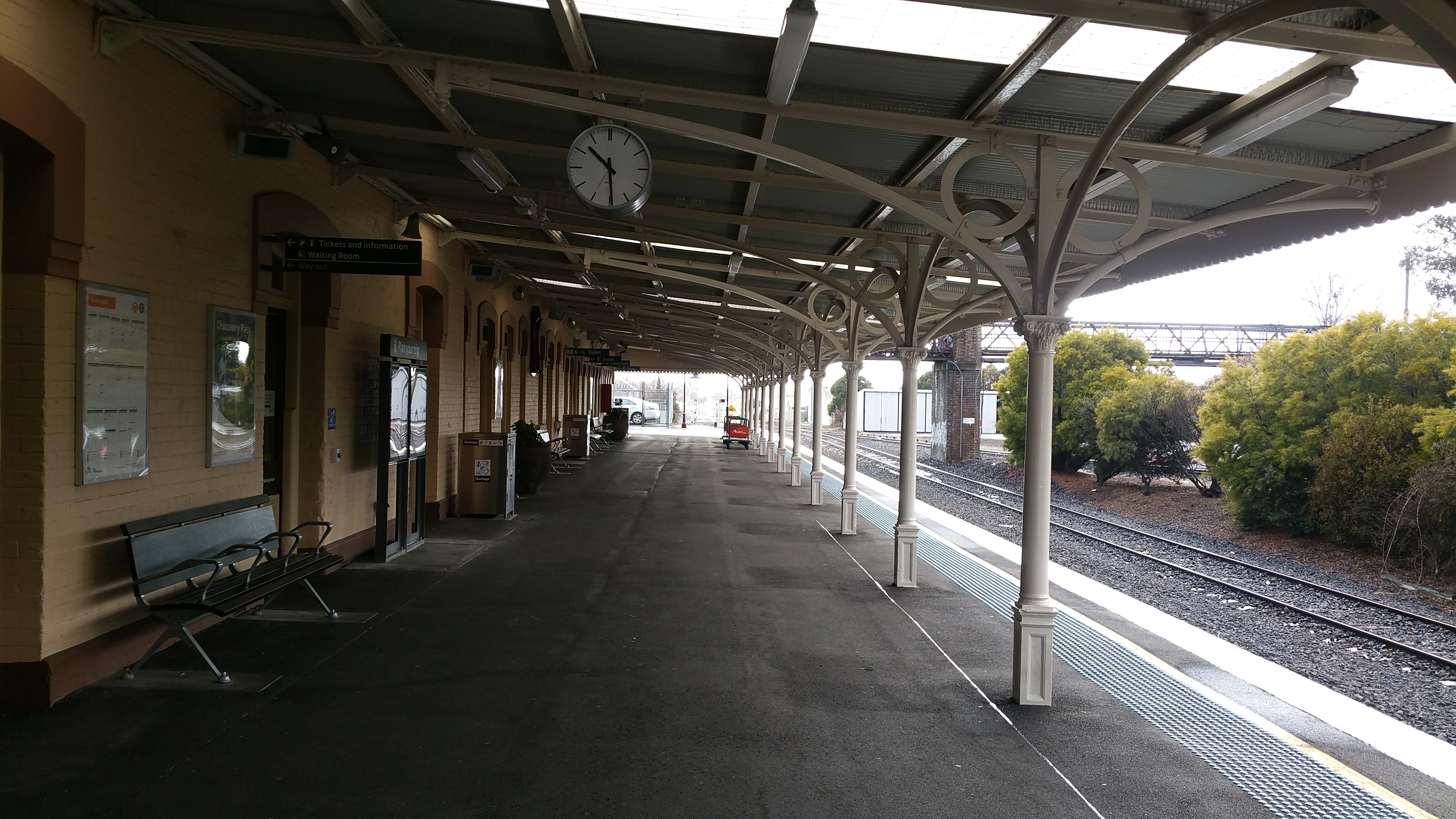
Covered area on platform

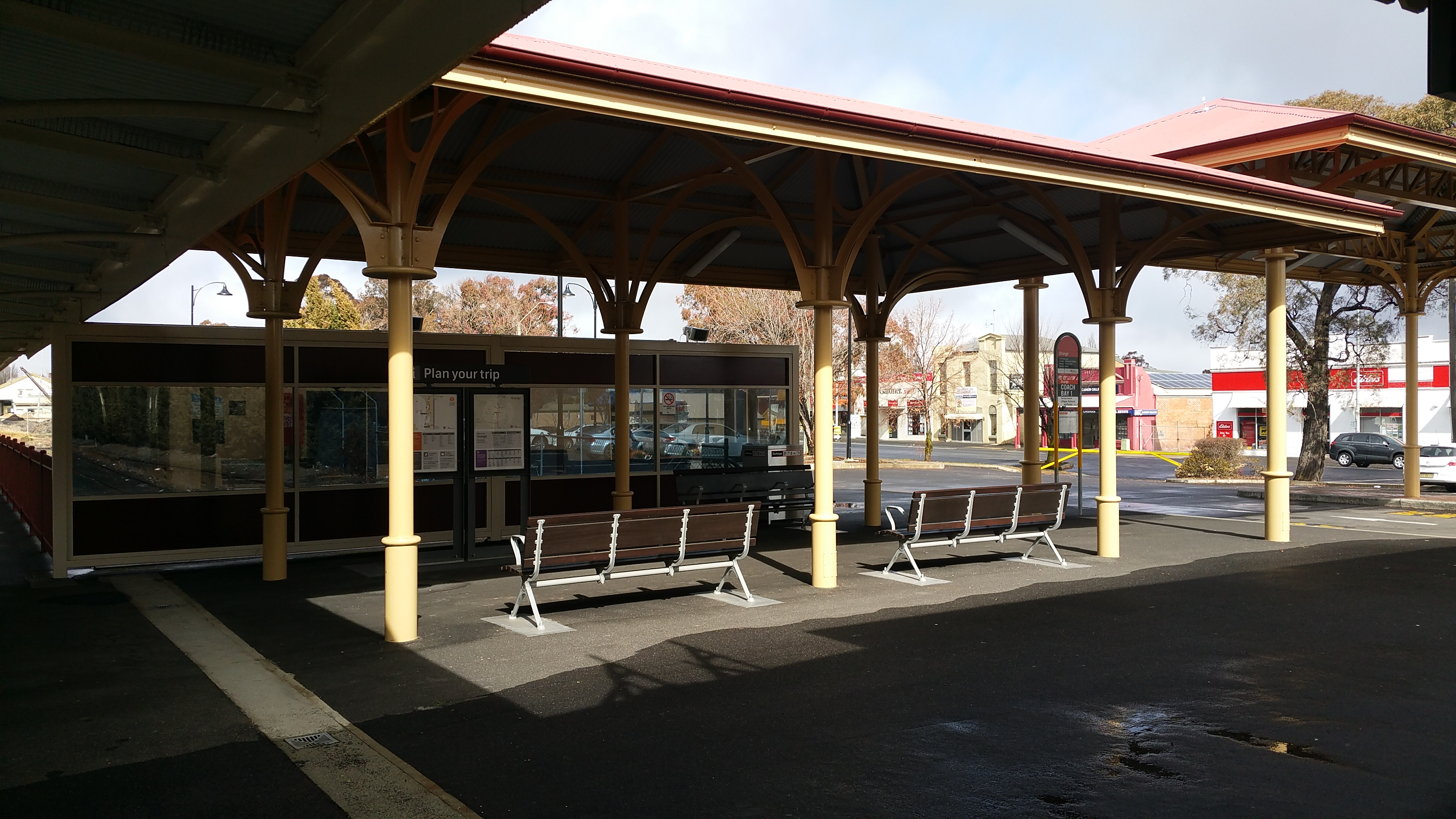
Outdoor Waiting area

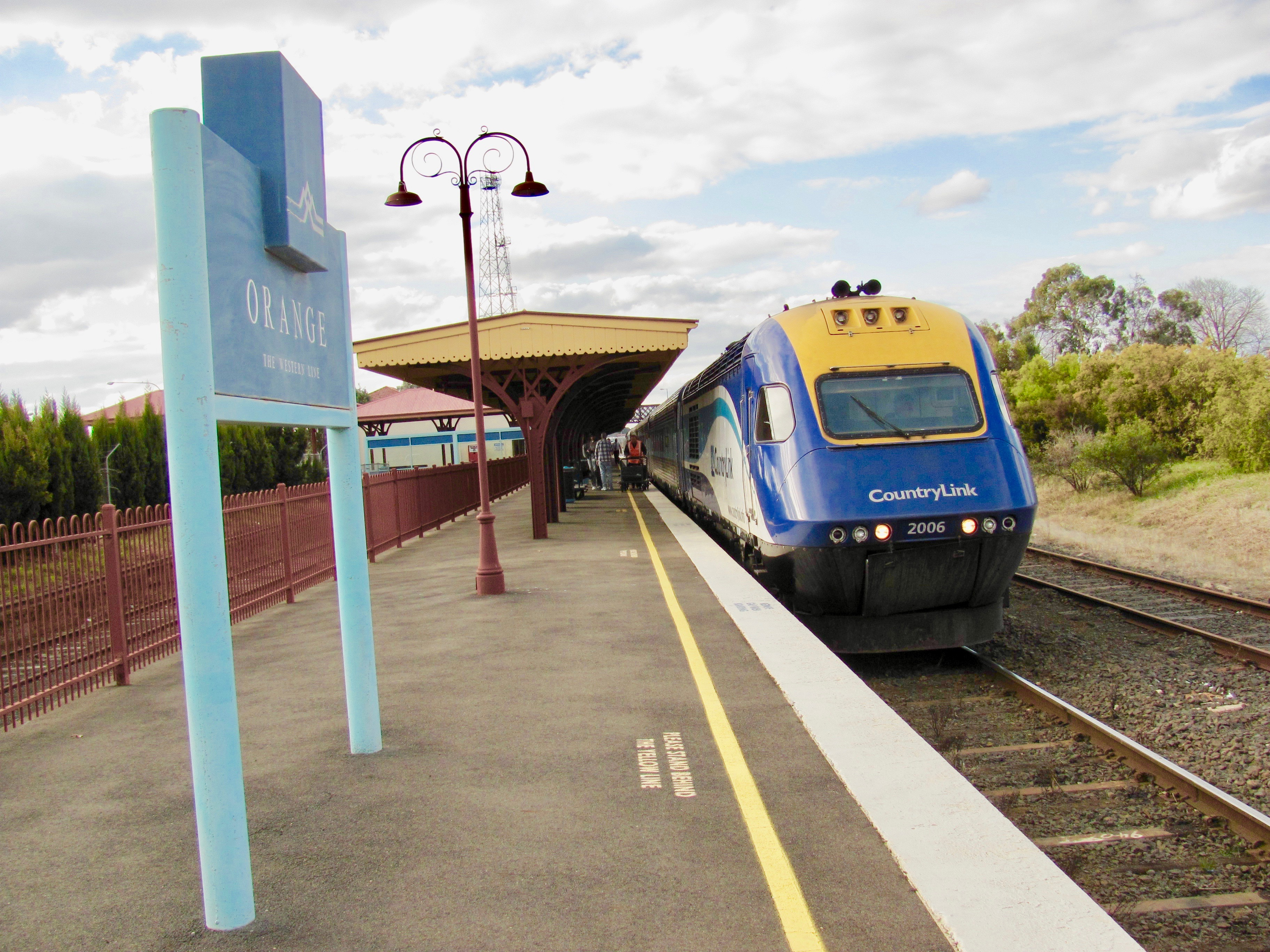
XPT arrives on the platform

== Description ==
Major structures at the complex include a type 1, sub-type 3, brick station buildings with combined office and station, completed in 1877, with additions completed in 1902, 1907, and 1915; and associated platform; both managed by RailCorp. Other structures, managed by the Australian Rail Track Corporation (ARTC) include a type ll Station Master's Residence located at 158 Peisley Street, completed in 1885; a timber Railway Institute Building located at 156 Peisley Street, completed c. 1921; an administration building located at 154 Peisley Street, completed c. 1950, a through goods shed located in Piesley Street, completed in 1877; a rail motor shed located in Piesley Street, completed c. 1950; a signal box, completed in 1938, identified for removal as part of a statewide strategy to manage redundant signal boxes; a transhipment shed located in Endsleigh Street, completed c. 1959; and a Perway Inspector's Office and Depot, also located in Endsleigh Street. Other items include an iron footbridge with concrete deck, completed in c. 1910 and extended in 1938; and a 4.5-tonne (5-short-ton) jib crane.

Station building, 1877, modified 1902, 1907, 1915

The brick station building was built with a combined two-storey residence for the Station Master with upstairs bedrooms. The building has since undergone a series of modifications but retains its Victorian form and character.

The building houses the central booking office, with extended wings along the platform for parcels, refreshments, waiting rooms and toilets. The building is constructed of brick in Flemish bond with label moulded rendered heads for openings, and corbelled and moulded render sills to double hung sash arched windows. The verandah is long and low to the platform and is supported on cast iron composite Corinthian style columns with cast iron angle brackets supporting roof in four directions.

Station Master's Residence, 1885

The former Station Master's residence is located at 158 Peisley St. It was built c.1885, is late Victorian and includes the following features: gabled front end and octagonal bay with pitched slate roof; main roof of hipped and gable form; four panel glazed entrance door; glazed French verandah doors; sloping iron verandah roof supported on square stop chamfered timber posts, and fine moulded rendered chimneys.

Railway institute building, c. 1921 Federation style weatherboard house with pitched corrugated iron roof and brick chimney. The verandah extends over the front porch only supported by timber posts and brick columns.

Administration building, c. 1950

The Administration Building is a symmetrical three storey polychromatic, brick building with a pitched tiled roof. It has evenly spaced windows around all sides of both levels, and the entrance way is marked with a neo-classical portico. Internally there have been some modifications, particularly to the first floor where offices and equipment relating to train controls have been installed. Security grates have been fitted to some windows and air-conditioning installed, unsympathetically in some instances. Window frames have been replaced with aluminium frames. The building has all new floor coverings and toilets have been installed. A glass panel and door has been added inside the entrance arch. The general internal layout is likely to be similar to as built, as are ceilings, some skirting, doors and stair banisters.

Goods shed, 1877

The goods shed consists of an internal frame of long Oregon hardwood timber beams clad in corrugated iron with a pitched roof. The roof has skylights along the enclosed section. The original shed was almost twice as long as it is today having extended northward to the end of the Orange railway station platform to where the jib crane still stands. The current dimensions are approximately 42m x 11.4m. The building has also been modified through the introduction of aluminium windows, roller doors and an awning extending from the northern end of the western side of the structure, along with landscaping. During its time of operation, a rail line passed through the eastern side of the building. The line is now covered over, and has possibly been removed. A wooden platform remains through the centre of the shed. The goods shed is being leased to Australian Native Landscapes as a storage and display centre for the retail of landscaping supplies. The tenants have constructed an office at the northern end of the building and a sales point in the centre.

Rail motor shed, c. 1950

Located in the goods yard adjacent to the goods shed. The shed is constructed using iron beams and trusses and corrugated iron cladding. Disused railway tracks run into the shed and there is a diesel tank sitting aloft iron stilts to the southern end of the eastern side of the structure. The type and condition of the materials used in the rail motor shed would suggest the provenance of the rail motor shed to be mid 20th century. Currently, the shed is part of the Australian Native Landscapes lease but is not being used for any function.

Signal box, 1938

The signal box is a two-storey timber board building located between the crossing loop track and the Main line south of the Orange railway station. The majority of the signals have been disconnected and decommissioned. Some levers have been removed. Air-conditioning has been installed.

Transhipment shed

The transhipment (OPR) shed was constructed c. 1959 by the Orange Producers Rural Association and is located on the eastern side of the rail precinct opposite the Orange railway station and goods shed. The building is an open style shed consisting of an iron support structure covered over with corrugated iron. The OPR shed spans over track that was previously the eighth line of 8 marshalling sidings at Orange. The shed is in a good condition though its integrity is diminished.

Perway office and depot

The Permanent Way Depot is located opposite the Administration Building on the eastern side of the Orange rail precinct to the north of the station. The buildings include an office and various sheds. The office area roof is constructed using corrugated iron and has an uneven pitched roof and verandah covering the entrance on the western side of the building.

Footbridge, 1910, extended 1938

The footbridge is a pedestrian overbridge that provides pedestrian access over the tracks. The original bridge was constructed c. 1910, of composite plain cast iron posts and brown brick piers, riveted iron beams and cast iron railing. It was then extended with the new section being obviously distinct from the original. The 1938 section of the bridge is noted as being the first welded truss bridge in the rail system. The original component of the bridge is recorded as the oldest surviving footbridge in NSW and the only example of its type.

Jib crane

Class No. 1, 5-tonne (5.5-short-ton), hand-operated jib crane. The crane was used to load and unload goods to and from rail wagons and road vehicles. Previously, the goods shed extended right up to where the jib crane still stands.

=== Condition ===
As at 18 July 2013, All structures appear generally to be in good condition. The station buildings have a high level of integrity.

== Heritage listing ==
As at 18 July 2013, Orange Railway Precinct is of state significance for its historic, aesthetic and rarity values. The 1877 two-storey Victorian station building is a fine and rare combined residence/station building, one of only four similar buildings in the state. The site is significant as a major railway complex comprising several rare, representative, and/or otherwise significant railway buildings and other structures including the goods shed (1877), Station Master's residence (1885), Railway Institute building (c. 1921), administration building (c. 1950) signal box (1938) and the transhipment shed (c. 1959). The cast iron footbridge is a rare structure reflecting a style of construction once similar to other pedestrian bridges and related structures built during the Whitton era in the late nineteenth century.

Orange railway station was listed on the New South Wales State Heritage Register on 2 April 1999 having satisfied the following criteria.

The place is important in demonstrating the course, or pattern, of cultural or natural history in New South Wales.

The site has historic significance, demonstrating the late 19th and early 20th Century development of the NSW railways. The station building dates from the opening of the line at Orange in 1877, and along with other structures within the yard precinct, has the ability to provide evidence of a late 19th century railway precinct. The scale and detailing of the station buildings reflect the importance and size of Orange as an important country location in NSW. As the Orange agricultural economy developed and railway technology progressed, so too did the use and layout of Orange Railway station, and the precinct demonstrates this historical growth.

The place is important in demonstrating aesthetic characteristics and/or a high degree of creative or technical achievement in New South Wales.

The station building has aesthetic significance as a fine Victorian railway station building that demonstrates railway design in the 1870s.

The place has a strong or special association with a particular community or cultural group in New South Wales for social, cultural or spiritual reasons.

The site is of social significance to the local community on account of its lengthy association for providing an important source of employment, trade and social interaction for the local area. The site is significant for its ability to contribute to the local community's sense of place, is a distinctive feature of the daily life of many community members, and provides a connection to the local community's past.

The place possesses uncommon, rare or endangered aspects of the cultural or natural history of New South Wales.

The 1877 two-storey, brick station building is a rare combined residence/station building, with only four other similar buildings in the state, the others being Bowning, Emu Plains, Wallerawang and Yass junction. The cast iron footbridge is a surviving rare structure reflecting a style of construction similar to Whitton's river bridges and pedestrian bridges from the late 19th century.

The place is important in demonstrating the principal characteristics of a class of cultural or natural places/environments in New South Wales.

The site has representative significance for its collection of railway structures, including the goods shed (1877), Station Master's residence (1885), Railway Institute building (c. 1921), administration building (c. 1950), signal box (1938) and the transhipment shed (c. 1959) and other related items that collectively demonstrate widespread 19th and early 20th century railway customs, activities and design in NSW, and are representative of similar items that are found in other railway sites across the state.

== See also ==
- List of regional railway stations in New South Wales
