= List of airports by IATA code: N =

IATA	ICAO	Airport name	Location served	Time	DST
-NA-
NAA	YNBR	Narrabri Airport	Narrabri, New South Wales, Australia	UTC+10:00	
NAC	YNRC	Naracoorte Airport	Naracoorte, South Australia, Australia	UTC+09:30	
NAD		Macanal Airport	Macanal, Colombia	UTC−05:00	
NAE	DBBN	Boundétingou Airport	Natitingou, Benin	UTC+01:00	
NAF		Banaina Airport	Banaina, Indonesia		
NAG	VANP	Dr. Babasaheb Ambedkar International Airport	Nagpur, Maharashtra, India	UTC+05:30	
NAH	WAMH	Naha Airport	Tahuna, Indonesia	UTC+08:00	
NAI	SYAN	Annai Airport	Annai, Guyana	UTC−04:00	
NAJ	UBBN	Nakhchivan International Airport	Nakhchivan, Azerbaijan	UTC+04:00	
NAK	VTUQ	Nakhon Ratchasima Airport	Nakhon Ratchasima, Thailand	UTC+07:00	
NAL	URMN	Nalchik Airport	Nalchik, Kabardino-Balkaria, Russia	UTC+03:00	
NAM	WAPR	Namlea Airport	Namlea, Indonesia		
NAN	NFFN	Nadi International Airport	Nadi, Fiji	UTC+12:00	
NAO	ZUNC	Nanchong Gaoping Airport	Nanchong, Sichuan, China	UTC+08:00	
NAP	LIRN	Naples International Airport	Naples, Campania, Italy	UTC+02:00	Mar-Oct
NAQ	BGQQ	Qaanaaq Airport	Qaanaaq, Greenland	UTC−04:00	
NAR	SKPN	Puerto Nare Airport	Puerto Nare, Colombia	UTC−05:00	
NAS	MYNN	Lynden Pindling International Airport	Nassau, New Providence, Bahamas	UTC−04:00	
NAT	SBNT	São Gonçalo do Amarante–Governador Aluízio Alves International Airport	Natal, Rio Grande do Norte, Brazil	UTC−03:00	
NAU	NTGN	Napuka Airport	Napuka, Tuamotus, French Polynesia	UTC−10:00	
NAV	LTAZ	Nevşehir Kapadokya Airport	Nevşehir, Turkey	UTC+03:00	
NAW	VTSC	Narathiwat Airport	Narathiwat, Thailand	UTC+07:00	
NAY	ZBNY	Beijing Nanyuan Airport	Beijing, China	UTC+08:00	
NAZ	AGNA	Nana Airport	Star Harbour, Solomon Islands	UTC+11:00	
-NB-
NBA		Nambaiyufa Airport	Nambaiyufa, Papua New Guinea	UTC+10:00	
NBB	SKBM	Barranco Minas Airport	Barranco Minas, Colombia	UTC−05:00	
NBC	UWKE	Begishevo Airport	Nizhnekamsk / Naberezhnye Chelny, Tatarstan, Russia	UTC+03:00	
NBD		Ningbo South Bus Station	Ningbo, Zhejiang, China	UTC+08:00	
NBE	DTNH	Enfidha-Hammamet International Airport	Enfidha, Tunisia	UTC+01:00	
NBG	KNBG	NAS JRB New Orleans (Alvin Callender Field)	New Orleans, Louisiana, United States	UTC−05:00	
NBH	YNHS	Nambucca Heads Airport	Nambucca Heads, New South Wales, Australia		
NBL	MPWN	Wannukandi Airport	San Blas, Panama	UTC−05:00	
NBN	FGAB	Annobón Airport	Annobón, Equatorial Guinea	UTC+01:00	
NBO	HKJK	Jomo Kenyatta International Airport	Nairobi, Kenya	UTC+03:00	
NBS	ZYBS	Changbaishan Airport	Baishan, Jilin, China	UTC+08:00	
NBW	KNBW	Leeward Point Field	Guantánamo Bay, Cuba	UTC−04:00	
NBX	WABI	Nabire Airport	Nabire, Indonesia	UTC+09:00	
-NC-
NCA	MBNC	North Caicos Airport	North Caicos, British Overseas Territory of Turks and Caicos Islands		
NCE	LFMN	Nice Côte d'Azur Airport	Nice, Provence-Alpes-Côte d'Azur, France	UTC+02:00	Mar-Oct
NCG	MMCG	Nuevo Casas Grandes Municipal Airport	Nuevo Casas Grandes, Chihuahua, Mexico		
NCH	HTNA	Nachingwea Airport	Nachingwea, Tanzania		
NCI	SKNC	Antioquia Airport	Necoclí, Colombia		
NCJ	SAFS	Sunchales Aeroclub Airport	Sunchales, Santa Fe, Argentina		
NCL	EGNT	Newcastle Airport	Newcastle upon Tyne, England, United Kingdom	UTC+01:00	Mar-Oct
NCN	PFCB	Chenega Bay Airport (FAA: C05)	Chenega, Alaska, United States		
NCO	KOQU	Quonset State Airport (FAA: OQU)	North Kingstown, Rhode Island, United States		
NCR	MNSC	San Carlos Airport	San Carlos, Nicaragua		
NCS	FANC	Newcastle Airport	Newcastle, South Africa		
NCT	MRNC	Nicoya Guanacaste Airport	Nicoya, Costa Rica		
NCU	UTNN	Nukus Airport	Nukus, Uzbekistan		
NCY	LFLP	Annecy – Haute-Savoie – Mont Blanc Airport	Annecy, Rhône-Alpes, France	UTC+02:00	Mar-Oct
-ND-
NDA	WAPC	Bandanaira Airport	Banda Islands, Indonesia		
NDB	GQPP	Nouadhibou International Airport	Nouadhibou, Mauritania		
NDC	VAND	Shri Guru Gobind Singh Ji Airport	Nanded, Maharashtra, India	UTC+05:30	
NDD	FNSU	Sumbe Airport	Sumbe, Angola		
NDE	HKMA	Mandera Airport	Mandera, Kenya		
NDF		N'dalatando Airport	N'dalatando, Angola		
NDG	ZYQQ	Qiqihar Sanjiazi Airport	Qiqihar, Heilongjiang, China	UTC+08:00	
NDI		Namudi Airport	Namudi, Papua New Guinea		
NDJ	FTTJ	N'Djamena International Airport	N'Djamena, Chad		
NDK		Namorik Airport (Namdrik Airport) (FAA: 3N0)	Namdrik Atoll, Marshall Islands		
NDL	FEFN	N'Délé Airport	N'Délé (Ndele), Central African Republic		
NDM	HAMN	Mendi Airport	Mendi, Ethiopia		
NDN		Nadunumu Airport	Nadunumu, Papua New Guinea		
NDP		Naval Air Station Ellyson Field (now retired)	Pensacola, Florida, United States		
NDR	GMMW	Nador International Airport	Nador, Morocco		
NDS	YSAN	Sandstone Airport	Sandstone, Western Australia, Australia		
NDU	FYRU	Rundu Airport	Rundu, Namibia		
NDY	EGES	Sanday Airport	Sanday, Scotland, United Kingdom	UTC+01:00	Mar-Oct
-NE-
NEC	SAZO	Necochea Airport	Necochea, Buenos Aires, Argentina		
NEF	UWUF	Neftekamsk Airport	Neftekamsk, Bashkortostan, Russia		
NEG	MKNG	Negril Aerodrome	Negril, Jamaica		
NEJ	HANJ	Nejjo Airport	Nejo, Ethiopia		
NEK	HANK	Nekemte Airport	Nekemte, Ethiopia		
NEL	KNEL	NAES Lakehurst (Maxfield Field)	Lakehurst, New Jersey, United States		
NEN	KNEN	NOLF Whitehouse	Jacksonville, Florida, United States		
NER	UELL	Chulman Neryungri Airport	Neryungri, Yakutia, Russia		
NEU	VLSN	Nong Khang Airport	Xam Neua, Laos		
NEV	TKPN	Vance W. Amory International Airport	Nevis, Saint Kitts and Nevis		
NEW	KNEW	Lakefront Airport	New Orleans, Louisiana, United States		
-NF-
NFG	USRN	Nefteyugansk Airport	Nefteyugansk, Khanty-Mansi Autonomous Okrug, Russia		
NFL	KNFL	NAS Fallon (Van Voorhis Field)	Fallon, Nevada, United States		
NFO	NFTO	Niuafo'ou Airport	Niuafo'ou, Tonga		
NFR	HLNR	Nafoora Airport	Nafoora, Libya		
-NG-
NGA	YYNG	Young Airport	Young, New South Wales, Australia		
NGB	ZSNB	Ningbo Lishe International Airport	Ningbo, Zhejiang, China	UTC+08:00	
NGD	TUPA	Auguste George Airport	Anegada, British Overseas Territory of Virgin Islands		
NGE	FKKN	Ngaoundéré Airport	Ngaoundéré, Cameroon		
NGF	PHNG	MCAS Kaneohe Bay	Kaneohe, Hawaii, United States		
NGI	NFNG	Gau Airport	Gau Island, Fiji		
NGK	UHSN	Nogliki Airport	Nogliki, Sakhalin Oblast, Russia		
NGL	FANG	Ngala Airfield	Ngala, South Africa		
NGN		Narganá Airport	Narganá, Panama		
NGO	RJGG	Chūbu Centrair International Airport	Nagoya, Honshu, Japan	UTC+09:00	
NGP	KNGP	NAS Corpus Christi (Truax Field)	Corpus Christi, Texas, United States		
NGQ	ZUAL	Ngari Gunsa Airport	Shiquanhe, Tibet Autonomous Region, China	UTC+08:00	
NGR		Ningerum Airport	Ningerum, Papua New Guinea		
NGS	RJFU	Nagasaki Airport	Nagasaki, Kyushu, Japan	UTC+09:00	
NGU	KNGU	NS Norfolk (Chambers Field)	Norfolk, Virginia, United States		
NGW	KNGW	NOLF Cabaniss Field	Corpus Christi, Texas, United States		
NGX	VNMA	Manang Airport	Manang, Nepal		
-NH-
NHA	VVNT	Nha Trang Air Base	Nha Trang, Vietnam		
NHD	OMDM	Al Minhad Air Base	Dubai, United Arab Emirates		
NHF	HSNW	New Halfa Airport	New Halfa, Sudan		
NHK	KNHK	NAS Patuxent River (Trapnell Field)	Patuxent River, Maryland, United States		
NHS		Nushki Airport	Nushki, Pakistan		
NHT	EGWU	RAF Northolt	Northolt, England, United Kingdom	UTC+01:00	Mar-Oct
NHV	NTMD	Nuku Hiva Airport	Nuku Hiva, Marquesas Islands, French Polynesia		
NHX	KNBJ	NOLF Barin (FAA: NBJ)	Foley, Alabama, United States		
NHZ	KBXM	Brunswick Executive Airport	Brunswick, Maine, United States		
-NI-
NIA	GLNA	Nimba Airport	Nimba, Liberia		
NIB	PAFS	Nikolai Airport (FAA: FSP)	Nikolai, Alaska, United States		
NIC	LCNC	Nicosia International Airport^{1}	Nicosia, Cyprus		
NIF	YCNF	Nifty Airport	Nifty Copper Mine, Telfer, Western Australia, Australia		
NIG	NGNU	Nikunau Airport	Nikunau, Kiribati		
NIK		Niokolo-Koba Airport	Niokolo-Koba, Senegal		
NIM	DRRN	Diori Hamani International Airport	Niamey, Niger		
NIN		Ninilchik Airport	Ninilchik, Alaska, United States		
NIO	FZBI	Nioki Airport	Nioki, Democratic Republic of the Congo		
NIP	KNIP	NAS Jacksonville (Towers Field)	Jacksonville, Florida, United States		
NIR		Chase Field Industrial Complex (FAA: 1XA2)	Beeville, Texas, United States		
NIS		Simberi Airport	Simberi Island, Papua New Guinea		
NIT	LFBN	Niort - Souché Airport	Niort, Poitou-Charentes, France	UTC+02:00	Mar-Oct
NIU	NTKN	Niau Airport	Niau, Tuamotus, French Polynesia		
NIX	GANR	Nioro Airport	Nioro du Sahel, Mali		
-NJ-
NJA	RJTA	Naval Air Facility Atsugi	Atsugi, Honshu, Japan	UTC+09:00	
NJC	USNN	Nizhnevartovsk Airport	Nizhnevartovsk, Khanty-Mansi Autonomous Okrug, Russia		
NJF	ORNI	Al Najaf International Airport	Al Najaf, Iraq		
NJK	KNJK	NAF El Centro	El Centro, California, United States		
-NK-
NKA		Nkan Airport	Ntoum (Nkan), Gabon		
NKB		Noonkanbah Airport	Noonkanbah Station, Western Australia, Australia		
NKC	GQNO	Nouakchott–Oumtounsy International Airport	Nouakchott, Mauritania		
NKD		Sinak Airport	Sinak, Indonesia		
NKG	ZSNJ	Nanjing Lukou International Airport	Nanjing, Jiangsu, China	UTC+08:00	
NKI		Naukati Bay Seaplane Base (FAA: AK62)	Naukati Bay, Alaska, United States		
NKJ		Nanjing South Railway Station	Nanjing, Jiangsu, China	UTC+08:00	
NKL	FZAR	Nkolo-Fuma Airport	Kolo Fuma, Democratic Republic of the Congo		
NKM	RJNA	Nagoya Airfield (Komaki Airport)	Nagoya, Honshu, Japan	UTC+09:00	
NKN		Nankina Airport	Nankina, Papua New Guinea		
NKO		Ankokoambo Airport	Ankokoambo, Madagascar		
NKP		Nukutepipi Airport	Nukutepipi, Tuamotus, French Polynesia		
NKS	FKAN	Nkongsamba Airport	Nkongsamba, Cameroon		
NKT	LTCV	Şırnak Airport	Şırnak / Cizre, Turkey		
NKU	FXNK	Nkaus Airport	Nkau, Lesotho		
NKX	KNKX	MCAS Miramar	San Diego, California, United States		
NKY	FCBY	Yokangassi Airport	Nkayi (N'kayi), Republic of the Congo		
-NL-
NLA	FLND	Simon Mwansa Kapwepwe International Airport	Ndola, Zambia		
NLC	KNLC	NAS Lemoore (Reeves Field)	Lemoore, California, United States		
NLD	MMNL	Quetzalcóatl International Airport	Nuevo Laredo, Tamaulipas, Mexico		
NLE		Jerry Tyler Memorial Airport (FAA: 3TR)	Niles, Michigan, United States		
NLF	YDNI	Darnley Island Airport	Darnley Island, Queensland, Australia		
NLG	PAOU	Nelson Lagoon Airport (FAA: OUL)	Nelson Lagoon, Alaska, United States		
NLH		Ninglang Luguhu Airport	Ninglang, Yunnan, China	UTC+08:00	
NLI	UHNN	Nikolayevsk-on-Amur Airport	Nikolayevsk-on-Amur, Khabarovsk Krai, Russia		
NLK	YSNF	Norfolk Island Airport	Norfolk Island, Australia		
NLL	YNUL	Nullagine Airport	Nullagine, Western Australia, Australia		
NLN		Kneeland Airport (FAA: O19)	Arcata / Eureka, California, United States		
NLO	FZAB	N'Dolo Airport	Kinshasa, Democratic Republic of the Congo		
NLP	FANS	Nelspruit Airport	Mbombela, South Africa		
NLS		Nicholson Airport	Nicholson, Western Australia, Australia		
NLT	ZWNL	Xinyuan Nalati Airport	Xinyuan, Xinjiang, China	UTC+08:00	
NLU	MMSM	Santa Lucía Air Force Base Num 1, Felipe Ángeles International Airport	Zumpango, State of Mexico, Mexico		
NLV	UKON	Mykolaiv International Airport	Mykolaiv, Ukraine		Mar-Oct
-NM-
NMA	UTFN	Namangan Airport	Namangan, Uzbekistan		
NMB	VADN	Daman Airport	Daman, Daman and Diu, India	UTC+05:30	
NMC	MYEN	Norman's Cay Airport	Norman's Cay, Exuma Islands, Bahamas		
NME	PAGT	Nightmute Airport (FAA: IGT)	Nightmute, Alaska, United States		
NMF	VRDA	Maafaru International Airport	Maafaru, Noonu, Maldives		
NMG		San Miguel Airport	San Miguel, Panama		
NMI	VANM	Navi Mumbai International Airport	Navi Mumbai, India	UTC+05:30	
NML		Fort McMurray/Mildred Lake Airport (TC: CAJ3)	Fort McMurray, Alberta, Canada		
NMN		Nomane Airport	Nomane, Papua New Guinea		
NMP		New Moon Airport	New Moon, Queensland, Australia		
NMR	YNAP	Nappa Merrie Airport	Nappa Merrie, Queensland, Australia		
NMS	VYNS	Nansang Airport	Nansang (Namsang), Myanmar		
NMT	VYNU	Namtu Airport	Namtu, Myanmar		
-NN-
NNA	GMMY	Kenitra Air Base	Kenitra, Morocco		
NNB	AGGT	Santa Ana Airport	Santa Ana Island (Owaraha), Solomon Islands		
NND		Nangade Airport	Nangade, Mozambique		
NNG	ZGNN	Nanning Wuxu International Airport	Nanning, Guangxi, China	UTC+08:00	
NNI	FYNA	Namutoni Airport	Namutoni, Namibia		
NNK		Naknek Airport (FAA: 5NK)	Naknek, Alaska, United States		
NNL	PANO	Nondalton Airport (FAA: 5NN)	Nondalton, Alaska, United States		
NNM	ULAM	Naryan-Mar Airport	Naryan-Mar, Nenets Autonomous Okrug, Russia		
NNR	EICA	Connemara Airport	Spiddal, Ireland		
NNS	VIPG	Naini-Saini Airport	Pithoragarh, Uttarakhand, India	UTC+05:30	
NNT	VTCN	Nan Nakhon Airport	Nan, Thailand		
NNU	SNNU	Nanuque Airport	Nanuque, Minas Gerais, Brazil		
NNX	WRLF	Nunukan Airport	Nunukan, Indonesia		
NNY	ZHNY	Nanyang Jiangying Airport	Nanyang, Henan, China	UTC+08:00	
-NO-
NOA	YSNW	NAS Nowra	Nowra, New South Wales, Australia		
NOB	MRNS	Nosara Airport	Nosara, Costa Rica		
NOC	EIKN	Ireland West Airport	Knock, Ireland		
NOD	EDWS	Norddeich Airport	Norden, Lower Saxony, Germany	UTC+02:00	Mar-Oct
NOG	MMNG	Nogales International Airport	Nogales, Sonora, Mexico		
NOI		Novorossiysk Airport	Novorossiysk, Krasnodar Krai, Russia		
NOJ	USRO	Noyabrsk Airport	Noyabrsk, Yamalo-Nenets Autonomous Okrug, Russia		
NOK	SWXV	Nova Xavantina Airport	Nova Xavantina, Mato Grosso, Brazil		
NOM	ATNR	Nomad River Airport	Nomad River, Papua New Guinea		
NON	NGTO	Nonouti Airport	Nonouti, Kiribati		
NOO		Naoro Airport	Naoro, Papua New Guinea		
NOP	LTCM	Sinop Airport	Sinop, Turkey		
NOR	BINF	Norðfjörður Airport	Nordfjordur, Iceland		
NOS	FMNN	Fascene Airport	Nosy Be, Madagascar		
NOT	KDVO	Marin County Airport (Gnoss Field) (FAA: DVO)	Novato, California, United States		
NOU	NWWW	La Tontouta International Airport	Nouméa, New Caledonia		
NOV	FNHU	Albano Machado Airport	Huambo, Angola		
NOZ	UNWW	Spichenkovo Airport	Novokuznetsk, Kemerovo Oblast, Russia		
-NP-
NPA	KNPA	NAS Pensacola (Forrest Sherman Field)	Pensacola, Florida, United States		
NPE	NZNR	Hawke's Bay Airport	Napier / Hastings, New Zealand		
NPG		Nipa Airport	Nipa, Papua New Guinea		
NPH		Nephi Municipal Airport (FAA: U14)	Nephi, Utah, United States		
NPL	NZNP	New Plymouth Airport	New Plymouth, New Zealand		
NPO	WIOG	Nanga Pinoh Airport	Nanga Pinoh, Indonesia		
NPP		Napperby Airport	Napperby Station, Northern Territory, Australia		
NPR	SJNP	Novo Progresso Airport	Novo Progresso, Pará, Brazil		
NPT	KUUU	Newport State Airport (FAA: UUU)	Newport, Rhode Island, United States		
NPU		San Pedro de Urabá Airport	San Pedro de Urabá, Colombia		
NPY	HTMP	Mpanda Airport	Mpanda, Katavi Region, Tanzania		
-NQ-
NQA	KNQA	Millington Regional Jetport	Millington, Tennessee, United States		
NQI	KNQI	NAS Kingsville	Kingsville, Texas, United States		
NQL	SWNQ	Niquelândia Airport	Niquelândia, Goiás, Brazil		
NQN	SAZN	Presidente Perón International Airport	Neuquén, Neuquén, Argentina		
NQT	EGBN	Nottingham Airport	Nottingham, England, United Kingdom	UTC+01:00	Mar-Oct
NQU	SKNQ	Reyes Murillo Airport	Nuquí, Colombia		
NQX	KNQX	NAS Key West (Boca Chica Field)	Key West, Florida, United States		
NQY	EGHQ	Newquay Airport	Newquay, England, United Kingdom	UTC+01:00	Mar-Oct
NQZ	UACC	Nursultan Nazarbayev International Airport (since June 8, 2020)	Astana, Kazakhstan		
-NR-
NRA	YNAR	Narrandera Airport	Narrandera, New South Wales, Australia		
NRB	KNRB	NS Mayport (Admiral David L. McDonald Field)	Mayport, Florida, United States		
NRC	KNRC	NASA Crows Landing Airport	Crows Landing, California, United States		
NRD	EDWY	Norderney Airfield	Norderney, Lower Saxony, Germany	UTC+02:00	Mar-Oct
NRE	WAPG	Namrole Airport	Namrole, Indonesia		
NRG	YNRG	Narrogin Airport	Narrogin, Western Australia, Australia		
NRI		Grand Lake Regional Airport (FAA: 3O9)	Afton, Oklahoma, United States		
NRK	ESSP	Norrköping Airport	Norrköping, Sweden	UTC+02:00	
NRL	EGEN	North Ronaldsay Airport	North Ronaldsay, Scotland, United Kingdom	UTC+01:00	Mar-Oct
NRM	GANK	Keibane Airport	Nara, Mali		
NRN	EDLV	Weeze Airport (Niederrhein Airport)	Weeze, North Rhine-Westphalia, Germany	UTC+02:00	Mar-Oct
NRR	TJRV	José Aponte de la Torre Airport (FAA: RVR)	Ceiba, Puerto Rico, United States		
NRS	KNRS	NOLF Imperial Beach (Ream Field)	Imperial Beach, California, United States		
NRT	RJAA	Narita International Airport	Chiba, Honshu, Japan	UTC+09:00	
NRY		Newry Airport	Newry Station, Northern Territory, Australia		
-NS-
NSB		North Seaplane Base	Bimini, Bahamas		
NSE	KNSE	NAS Whiting Field – North	Milton, Florida, United States		
NSH	OINN	Noshahr Airport	Nowshahr, Iran		
NSI	FKYS	Yaoundé Nsimalen International Airport	Yaoundé, Cameroon		
NSK	UOOO	Alykel Airport	Norilsk, Krasnoyarsk Krai, Russia		
NSL	KDVP	Slayton Municipal Airport (FAA: DVP)	Slayton, Minnesota, United States		
NSM	YNSM	Norseman Airport	Norseman, Western Australia, Australia		
NSN	NZNS	Nelson Airport	Nelson, New Zealand		
NSO	YSCO	Scone Airport	Scone, New South Wales, Australia		
NSR	SWKQ	São Raimundo Nonato Airport	São Raimundo Nonato, Brazil		
NST	VTSF	Nakhon Si Thammarat Airport	Nakhon Si Thammarat, Thailand		
NSV	YNSH	Noosa Airport	Noosaville, Queensland, Australia		
NSY	LICZ	Naval Air Station Sigonella	Catania, Sicily, Italy	UTC+02:00	Mar-Oct
-NT-
NTA		Natadola Seaplane Base	Natadola Bay, Fiji		
NTB	ENNO	Notodden Airport, Tuven	Notodden, Norway	UTC+02:00	Mar-Oct
NTC		Santa Carolina Airport	Santa Carolina, Mozambique		
NTD	KNTD	NAS Point Mugu (Naval Base Ventura County)	Point Mugu, California, United States		
NTE	LFRS	Nantes Atlantique Airport	Nantes, Pays de la Loire, France	UTC+02:00	Mar-Oct
NTG	ZSNT	Nantong Xingdong Airport	Nantong, Jiangsu, China	UTC+08:00	
NTI		Stenkool Airport	Bintuni, Indonesia		
NTJ		Manti-Ephraim Airport (FAA: 41U)	Manti, Utah, United States		
NTL	YWLM	Newcastle Airport / RAAF Base Williamtown	Newcastle, New South Wales, Australia		
NTM	SNRW	Miracema do Tocantins Airport	Miracema do Tocantins, Tocantins, Brazil		
NTN	YNTN	Normanton Airport	Normanton, Queensland, Australia		
NTO	GVAN	Agostinho Neto Airport	Santo Antão, Cape Verde		
NTQ	RJNW	Noto Airport	Wajima, Honshu, Japan	UTC+09:00	
NTR	MMAN	Del Norte International Airport	Monterrey, Nuevo León, Mexico		
NTT	NFTP	Niuatoputapu Airport	Niuatoputapu, Tonga		
NTU	KNTU	NAS Oceana (Apollo Soucek Field)	Virginia Beach, Virginia, United States		
NTX	WION	Ranai Airport	Natuna Islands, Indonesia		
NTY	FAPN	Pilanesberg International Airport	Sun City, South Africa		
-NU-
NUA		Gregory Lake Seaplane Base	Nuwara Eliya, Sri Lanka		
NUB	YNUM	Numbulwar Airport	Numbulwar, Northern Territory, Australia		
NUD	HSNH	En Nahud Airport	En Nahud, Sudan		
NUE	EDDN	Nuremberg Airport	Nuremberg, Bavaria, Germany	UTC+02:00	Mar-Oct
NUF		Castlereigh Reservoir Seaplane Base	Hatton, Sri Lanka		
NUG		Nuguria Airstrip	Nuguria, Papua New Guinea		
NUH		Nunchía Airport	Nunchía, Colombia		
NUI	PAQT	Nuiqsut Airport (FAA: AQT)	Nuiqsut, Alaska, United States		
NUJ	OIHS	Hamedan Air Base (Nogeh Airport)	Hamadan, Iran		
NUK	NTGW	Nukutavake Airport	Nukutavake, Tuamotus, French Polynesia		
NUL	PANU	Nulato Airport	Nulato, Alaska, United States		
NUM	OENN	Neom Bay Airport	Neom, Saudi Arabia		
NUN	KNUN	NOLF Saufley Field	Pensacola, Florida, United States		
NUP		Nunapitchuk Airport (FAA: 16A)	Nunapitchuk, Alaska, United States		
NUQ	KNUQ	Moffett Federal Airfield	Mountain View, California, United States		
NUR	YNUB	Nullarbor Motel Airport	Nullarbor, South Australia, Australia		
NUS	NVSP	Norsup Airport	Norsup, Malakula, Vanuatu		
NUT		Nutuve Airport	Nutuve, Papua New Guinea		
NUU	HKNK	Nakuru Airport	Nakuru, Kenya		
NUW	KNUW	NAS Whidbey Island (Ault Field)	Oak Harbor, Washington, United States		
NUX	USMU	Novy Urengoy Airport	Novy Urengoy, Yamalo-Nenets Autonomous Okrug, Russia		
-NV-
NVA	SKNV	Benito Salas Airport	Neiva, Colombia		
NVD	KNVD	Nevada Municipal Airport	Nevada, Missouri, United States		
NVG	MNNG	Nueva Guinea Airport	Nueva Guinea, Nicaragua		
NVI	UTSA	Navoiy International Airport	Navoiy, Uzbekistan		
NVK	ENNK	Narvik Airport, Framnes	Narvik, Norway		
NVN		Nervino Airport (FAA: O02)	Beckwourth, California, United States		
NVP		Novo Aripuanã Airport	Novo Aripuanã, Amazonas, Brazil		
NVR	ULNN	Novgorod Airport	Veliky Novgorod, Novgorod Oblast, Russia		
NVS	LFQG	Nevers - Fourchambault Airport	Nevers, Burgundy, France		Mar-Oct
NVT	SBNF	Navegantes–Ministro Victor Konder International Airport	Navegantes, Santa Catarina, Brazil		
NVY	VONV	Neyveli Airport	Neyveli, Tamil Nadu, India	UTC+05:30	
-NW-
NWA	FMCI	Mohéli Bandar Es Eslam Airport	Mohéli, Comoros		
NWH		Parlin Field (FAA: 2B3)	Newport, New Hampshire, United States		
NWI	EGSH	Norwich International Airport	Norwich, England, United Kingdom	UTC+01:00	Mar-Oct
NWT		Nowata Airport	Nowata, Papua New Guinea		
-NX-
NXA		Xiongan City Air Terminal	Xiong'an, Hebei, China	UTC+08:00	
-NY-
NYA	USHN	Nyagan Airport	Nyagan, Khanty-Mansi Autonomous Okrug, Russia		
NYC		metropolitan area^{2}	New York City, New York, United States		
NYE	HKNI	Nyeri Airport	Nyeri, Kenya		
NYG	KNYG	MCAF Quantico (Turner Field)	Quantico, Virginia, United States		
NYI	DGSN	Sunyani Airport	Sunyani, Ghana		
NYK	HKNY	Nanyuki Airport	Nanyuki, Kenya		
NYM	USMM	Nadym Airport	Nadym, Yamalo-Nenets Autonomous Okrug, Russia		
NYN	YNYN	Nyngan Airport	Nyngan, New South Wales, Australia		
NYO	ESKN	Stockholm Skavsta Airport	Stockholm / Nyköping, Sweden		
NYR	UENN	Nyurba Airport	Nyurba, Yakutia, Russia		
NYS		New York Skyports Seaplane Base	New York City, United States		
NYT	VYNT	Naypyidaw Airport	Naypyidaw (Naypyitaw), Myanmar		
NYU	VYBG	Nyaung U Airport	Bagan / Nyaung-U, Myanmar		
NYW	VYMY	Monywa Airport	Monywa, Myanmar		
-NZ-
NZA	FNZG	Nzagi Airport	Nzagi, Angola		
NZC	SPZA	Maria Reiche Neuman Airport	Nazca, Peru		
NZE	GUNZ	Nzérékoré Airport	Nzérékoré, Guinea		
NZH	ZBMZ	Manzhouli Xijiao Airport	Manzhouli, Inner Mongolia, China	UTC+08:00	
NZL	ZBZL	Zhalantun Chengjisihan Airport	Zhalantun, Inner Mongolia, China	UTC+08:00	
NZY	KNZY	NAS North Island (Halsey Field)	San Diego, California, United States		

== Notes ==
- ^1 Nicosia International Airport (IATA: NIC, ICAO: LCNC) has been inoperative since 1974 but retains its airport codes.
- ^2 NYC collectively refers to John F. Kennedy International Airport (IATA: JFK), LaGuardia Airport (IATA: LGA), Newark Liberty International Airport (IATA: EWR), and Stewart International Airport (IATA: SWF).
