= 139th meridian west =

Line of longitude

139th meridian west

The meridian 139° west of Greenwich is a line of longitude that extends from the North Pole across the Arctic Ocean, North America, the Pacific Ocean, the Southern Ocean, and Antarctica to the South Pole.

The 139th meridian west forms a great circle with the 41st meridian east.

== From Pole to Pole ==
Starting at the North Pole and heading south to the South Pole, the 139th meridian west passes through:

Co-ordinates	Country, territory or sea	Notes
90°0′N 139°0′W	Arctic Ocean	
73°57′N 139°0′W	Beaufort Sea	
69°38′N 139°0′W	Canada	Yukon — Herschel Island
69°34′N 139°0′W	Beaufort Sea	Mackenzie Bay
69°26′N 139°0′W	Canada	Yukon; British Columbia — for about 2 km from 60°0′N 139°0′W
59°59′N 139°0′W	United States	Alaska
59°16′N 139°0′W	Pacific Ocean	Passing just west of Fatu Huku island, French Polynesia (at 9°26′S 138°56′W)
9°42′S 139°0′W	French Polynesia	Hiva Oa island
9°49′S 139°0′W	Pacific Ocean	Passing just east of Tahuata island, French Polynesia (at 9°56′S 139°2′W); Passing just west of Mohotani island, French Polynesia (at 9°58′S 138°51′W); Passing just west of Puka-Puka atoll, French Polynesia (at 14°48′S 138°51′W); Passing just east of Akiaki atoll, French Polynesia (at 18°34′S 138°51′W); Passing just west of Vahitahi atoll, French Polynesia (at 18°47′S 138°52′W); Passing just west of Nukutavake island, French Polynesia (at 19°17′S 138°49′W); Passing just east of Vairaatea atoll, French Polynesia (at 19°20′S 139°11′W); Passing just east of Vanavana atoll, French Polynesia (at 20°46′S 139°7′W)
21°51′S 139°0′W	French Polynesia	Moruroa atoll
21°53′S 139°0′W	Pacific Ocean	Passing just west of Fangataufa atoll, French Polynesia (at 22°13′S 138°48′W)
60°0′S 139°0′W	Southern Ocean	
75°12′S 139°0′W	Antarctica	Unclaimed territory

== See also ==
- 138th meridian west
- 140th meridian west
