= FUMA =

Fuma may refer to:

== People ==
- Fuma (wrestler) (ふうま; Born 1986), Japanese professional wrestler
- Fūma Kotarō (風魔 小太郎; Died 1603), Japanese leader of the ninja Fūma clan
- Fuma Kikuchi (菊池 風磨; Born 1995), Japanese singer, actor and performer and is a member of timelesz
- Fuma Shirasaka (白坂 楓馬; Born 1996), Japanese footballer
- Fuma Marata (村田 風雅; Born 1998), Japanese singer, dancer and performer and is a member of &TEAM

== Characters ==
- Fuma Monou character in the manga X (manga)
- Yatogami Fuma Japanese Virtual YouTuber associated with Hololive Production

== Place ==
- Kolo Fuma a community in Bas-Congo Province
- Nkolo-Fuma Airport an airport serving the village of Kolo Fuma

== Series ==
- Fūma no Kojirō Japanese manga series
- Getsu Fūma Den Japanese action role-playing game
- Getsu Fūma Den: Undying Moon Japanese hack-and-slash roguevania platformer video game
- The Fuma Conspiracy Japanese animated action adventure comedy film

== Other uses ==
- Flinders University Museum of Art
- Fork Union Military Academy
- Functional mapping and annotation of genetic associations
