= NYN =

NYN may refer to:

- The IATA code for Nyngan Airport
- The ISO-639 code for the Nkore language
- The train station code for Naini, Prayagraj, India
- The geocode for Ningyuan County, Yongzhou Prefecture, Hunan Province, China; see List of administrative divisions of Hunan
- New York Nets ABA/NBA basketball team
