= Nukutavake Airport =

Nukutavake Airport Aérodrome de Nukutavake
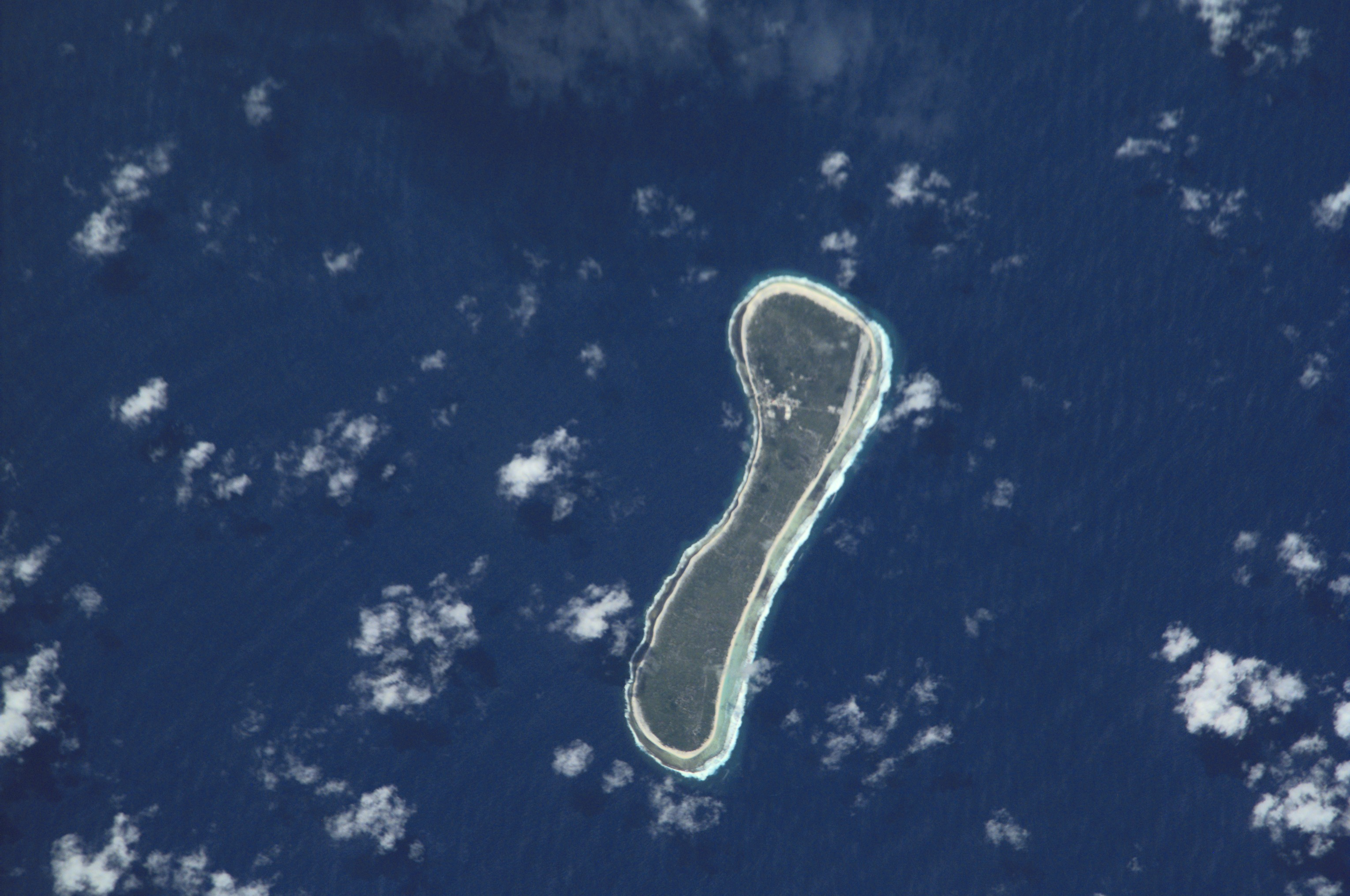
- NASA satellite image of Nukutavake
- IATA: NUK; ICAO: NTGW

Summary
- Airport type: Public
- Operator: DSEAC Polynésie Française
- Serves: Nukutavake
- Location: Nukutavake, Tuamotu, French Polynesia
- Elevation AMSL: 17 ft / 5 m
- Coordinates: 19°17′06″S 138°46′19″W

Map
- Location of the airport in French Polynesia

Runways
Direction	Length		Surface
Direction	m	ft	Surface
07L/25R	1,030	3,379	Paved
- Source: French AIP.

Nukutavake Airport (IATA: NUK, ICAO: NTGW) is an airport serving the village of Tavananui, located on the Nukutavake island, in the Tuamotu group of atolls in French Polynesia, 1,125 kilometres (699 mi) from Tahiti. The closest land is small Pinaki Atoll, located 15 kilometres (9.3 mi) to the southeast. Vairaatea Atoll Atoll lies 38 kilometres (24 mi) to the west of Nukutavake.

The airport was inaugurated in 1981.

== Airlines and destinations ==
=== Passenger ===
No scheduled flights as of May 2019.

== See also ==
- List of airports in French Polynesia
