= 139th meridian =

139th meridian may refer to:

- 139th meridian east, a line of longitude east of the Greenwich Meridian
- 139th meridian west, a line of longitude west of the Greenwich Meridian

139th meridian west	139th meridian east
