= NLE =

NLE is an acronym. It can refer to:

== In education ==
- National Latin Exam, a test given to Latin students
- National Library of Education (United States) – U.S. national library
- Philippine Nursing Licensure Exam, a basic level nursing exam given in public schools in the Philippines

== In science, medicine, and technology ==
- Non-linear editing system, a form of audio, video, and image editing
- N.L.E. Tractors, a codename for Cultivator No. 6

== In transportation ==
- North Luzon Expressway, an expressway located in the Philippines
- The Northern line extension to Battersea, an underground extension project in London
- IATA code for Jerry Tyler Memorial Airport, Niles, Michigan

== People ==
- NLE Choppa, an American rapper and his label No Love Entertainment

== Sports ==
- National League East, a division of Major League Baseball
