= Pinaki (French Polynesia) =

Atoll in French Polynesia

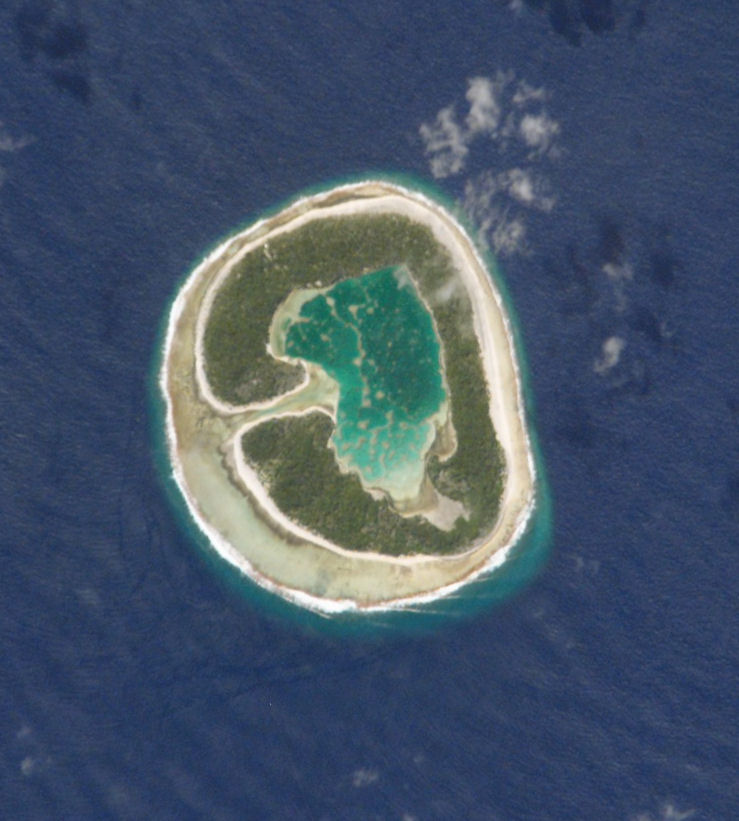
- NASA satellite image of Pinaki atoll

- Location within French Polynesia

Geography
- Location: Pacific Ocean
- Coordinates: 19°25′S 138°42′W
- Archipelago: Tuamotus
- Area: 0.7 km^{2} (0.27 sq mi) (lagoon); 1.3 km^{2} (1 sq mi) (above water)
- Length: 3 km (1.9 mi)
- Width: 2 km (1.2 mi)

Administration
- France
- Overseas collectivity: French Polynesia
- Administrative subdivision: Îles Tuamotu-Gambier
- Commune: Nukutavake

Demographics
- Population: Uninhabited (2012)

Pinaki (also referred to as Te Kiekie or Artomix) is a small atoll of the Tuamotu group in French Polynesia. Geographically Pinaki Atoll is part of the East-central subgroup of the Tuamotus, which includes Ahunui, Amanu, Fangatau, Hao and Nukutavake.

== Geography ==
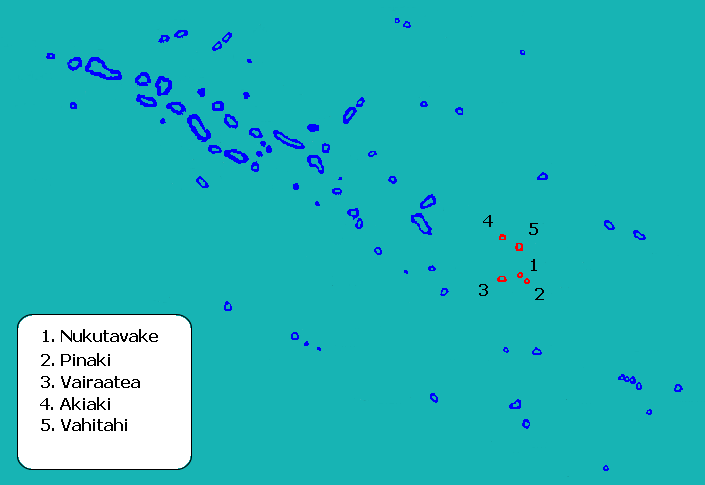
Location of Pinaki within the Tuamotu archipelago.

The island on its reef forms a broken ring almost enclosing a lagoon which has a shallow tidal spillway facing west. Pinaki lies 14 km southeast of Nukutavake, which is the closest land. Vairaatea Atoll lies 51 km to the west of Pinaki. Pinaki Atoll measures 3 km in length and its width is less than 2 km. It has a land area of 1.3 km^{2} and a lagoon area of 0.7 km^{2}. Pinaki is uninhabited, but it is visited on occasions by villagers from neighboring Nukutavake.

== History ==
The Englishman Samuel Wallis was the first recorded European to visit Pinaki Atoll on June 6, 1767, while searching for the "Southern Continent". Wallis named the atoll "Whitsunday". Frederick Beechey found Pinaki uninhabited in 1826, but he observed that there were huts on the island as well as small reservoirs for the collection and preservation of fresh water cut in the coral rock.

== Administration ==
Pinaki belongs to the commune of Nukutavake, which includes three other atolls apart from Pinaki, Vahitahi, Vairaatea and uninhabited Akiaki.
