= 140th meridian west =

Line of longitude

140th meridian west

The meridian 140° west of Greenwich is a line of longitude that extends from the North Pole across the Arctic Ocean, North America, the Pacific Ocean, the Southern Ocean, and Antarctica to the South Pole.

The line is the divider in the area of warning responsibility between the National Hurricane Center and the Central Pacific Hurricane Center in the north Pacific Ocean.

The 140th meridian west forms a great circle with the 40th meridian east.

== From Pole to Pole ==
Starting at the North Pole and heading south to the South Pole, the 140th meridian west passes through:

Co-ordinates	Country, territory or sea	Notes
90°0′N 140°0′W	Arctic Ocean	
73°48′N 140°0′W	Beaufort Sea	
69°37′N 140°0′W	Canada	Yukon
60°11′N 140°0′W	United States	Alaska
59°46′N 140°0′W	Pacific Ocean	Yakutat Bay
8°49′S 140°0′W	French Polynesia	Island of Nuku Hiva
8°57′S 140°0′W	Pacific Ocean	Passing just east of Ua Pou island, French Polynesia (at 9°22′S 140°1′W); Passing just east of Fakahina atoll, French Polynesia (at 15°58′S 140°5′W)
60°0′S 140°0′W	Southern Ocean	
75°13′S 140°0′W	Antarctica	Unclaimed territory

== See also ==
- 139th meridian west
- 141st meridian west
