= Akiaki =

Atoll in French Polynesia

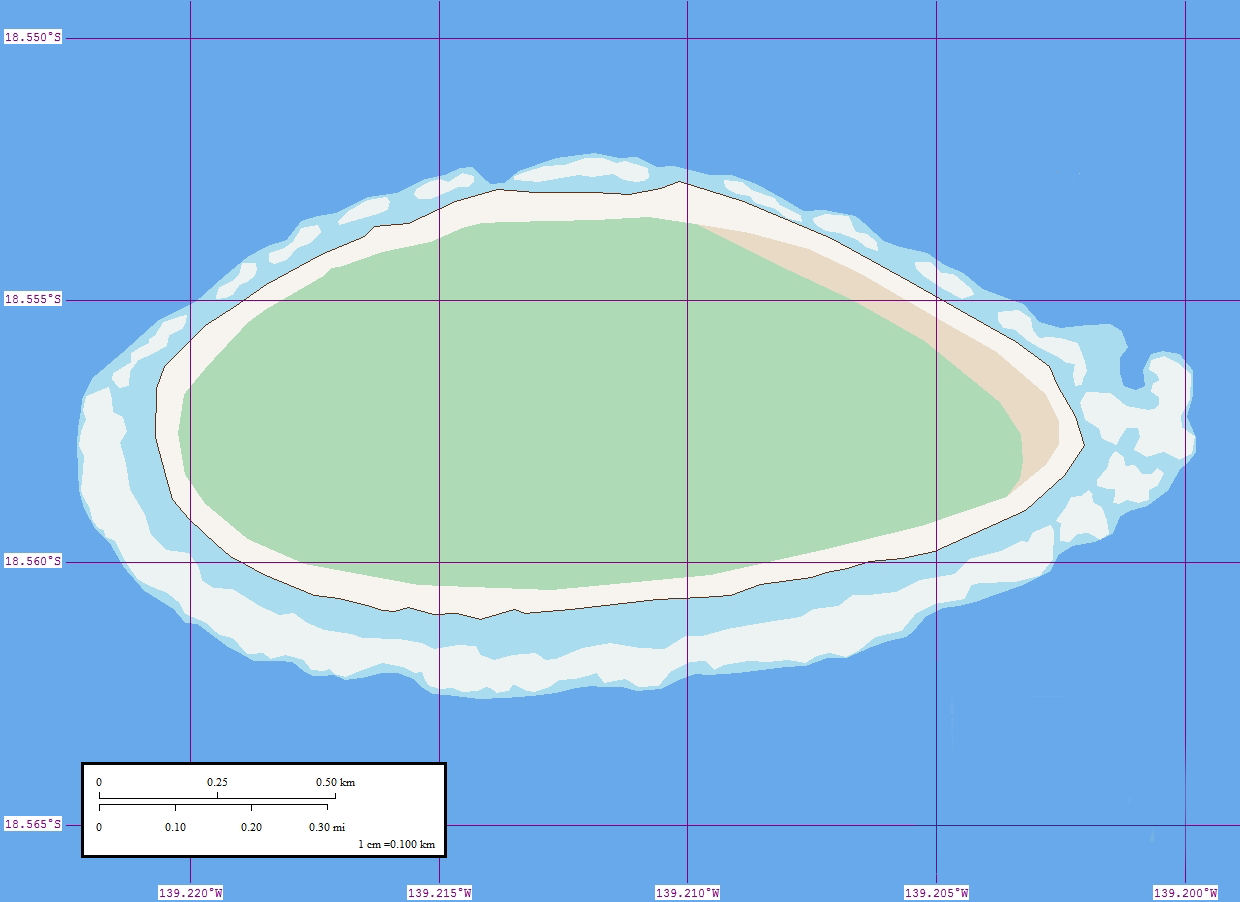
- Map of Akiaki Atoll

- Location within French Polynesia

Geography
- Location: Pacific Ocean
- Coordinates: 18°33′S 139°13′W
- Archipelago: Tuamotus
- Area: 1.3 km^{2} (0.50 sq mi)
- Length: 2 km (1.2 mi)
- Width: 0.9 km (0.56 mi)

Administration
- France
- Overseas collectivity: French Polynesia
- Administrative subdivision: Îles Tuamotu-Gambier
- Commune: Nukutavake

Demographics
- Population: 13 (2020)

Akiaki is a low coral atoll in the eastern area of the Tuamotu Archipelago, French Polynesia. Akiaki's nearest neighbor is Vahitahi, which is located 41 km to the southeast.

Akiaki is a small atoll rising barely above sea level. The total land surface is only 1.3 km^{2}. Its reef is occupied by a single flat island covered with coconut trees and other vegetation. There is no lagoon and it has only a difficult landing located on its northwestern side.

Akiaki is barely inhabited with a rough total of 13 residents, its occasionally visited by tourists for its coconut plantations. Akiaki maintains a small fishing port used by the residents as their source of revenue.

== History ==
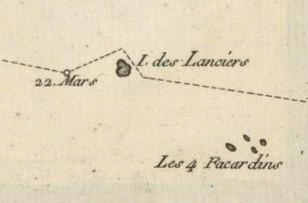
The first map of Akiaki (île des Lanciers) published in 1768 by Bougainville during his voyage on March 22, 1768. "Les 4 Facardins" refer to Vahitahi.

The first recorded European that arrived to Akiaki Atoll was Louis Antoine de Bougainville on 22 March 1768. He called this atoll Ile des Lanciers. James Cook reached Akiaki the following year, during his first voyage, and named it Thrum Island.

== Geology ==
Akiaki lies on top of a small seamount which is part of the Tuamotu Seamount Trail on the Pacific Plate. Akiaki's seamount is 3420 m high.

== Administration ==
Administratively Akiaki Atoll belongs to the commune of Nukutavake, which includes Nukutavake, as well as the atolls of Vahitahi, Vairaatea, Pinaki and Akiaki.

== See also ==
- Desert island
- List of islands
