= Chinese Graves and Burner at Nyngan Cemetery =

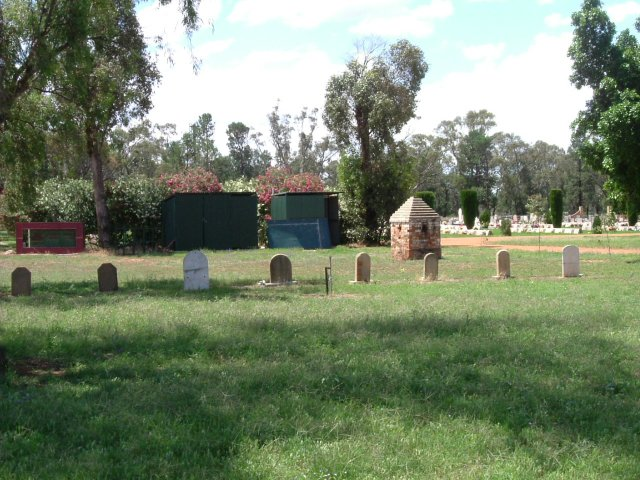
- Graves and Burner at Nyngan Cemetery

- Location within New South Wales Location within Australia
- 31°34′26″S 147°12′21″E
- Location: Nyngan, Bogan Shire, New South Wales, Australia

History
- Built: 1913–1924

Site notes
- Owner: NSW Land Registry Services

New South Wales Heritage Register
- Official name: Chinese Graves and Burner at Nyngan Cemetery
- Type: State heritage (complex / group)
- Designated: 13 March 2009
- Reference no.: 1783
- Type: Isolated Grave/Burial Site
- Category: Cemeteries and Burial Sites

The Chinese Graves and Burner at Nyngan Cemetery is a heritage-listed burial site located at Cemetery Road, Nyngan, in the Orana region of New South Wales, Australia. They were created from 1913 to 1924. The property is owned by NSW Land Registry Services, a privatised agency of the New South Wales Government. The site was added to the New South Wales State Heritage Register on 13 March 2009.

== History ==
=== Indigenous occupation ===
The Bogan River running through Bogan Shire forms the boundary between the Wongaibon to the east and the Nyaampiyaa to the west. Thomas Mitchell's favourable report led to the expansion of settlers into the area. The Wongaibon and Nyaampiyaa were hostile to the invasion and after the substantial loss of European life the Government ordered the settlers out of the area. European occupation in the adjacent districts reached sufficient density in 1850 to protect the return of settlers and suppress the traditional owners.

=== European history ===
The area around Nyngan was first explored by John Oxley in 1818. Further explorations were made by John Sturt in 1827–1829 and Thomas Mitchell in 1831. Squatters, with both cattle and sheep, had taken up the land by this time. During the early period there were many absentee owners and cattle were more profitable than sheep, requiring less men to keep them. Markets were also better for cattle, with the goldfields of Victoria desperate for supplies of meat. After 1860, as permanent land rights were given and the price of wool rose, more owners came to live on the land and sheep began to outnumber cattle. The area around Nyngan remained within large pastoral holdings until the 1880s that were only broken up with the event of the railway.

Nyngan, until 1883, had been a water reserve, which was the attraction that made it a stop for the new train line. Canonbar, a town 30 kilometres (19 mi) to the north of Nyngan, relocated to the site of the Nyngan railway station. The railway allowed the town to grow quickly and by 1891 it was a municipality and in 1901 it had all necessities of a town.

Even before the advent of the railway it seems settlers were increasing in the area. Long discussion on the placement of a cemetery culminated in the establishment of the Nyngan cemetery some time in the 1850s. The exact date is unclear as records for this early period are scarce. The first recorded burial was in 1878, which may indicate that records were not kept or no longer exist for the earlier period.

=== Chinese in Nyngan ===
Many Chinese left China in the hope of earning a good living and supporting their families left behind. By 1861 there were 13,000 Chinese on New South Wales goldfields. At the end of the gold rush many Chinese stayed on in Australia, finding employment in other industries. The Chinese were attracted to the Tamworth region by the discovery of gold in the 1850s. The deposits did not last long, but many Chinese remained in the area, migrating north in search of work. It is not clear when the Chinese community in Nyngan was established, but the oldest surviving grave marker dates to 1913. The main occupation for Chinese in Nyngan was timber-felling and ring-barking, especially mulga (Acacia aneura) and bimble box (Eucalyptus populnea), or clearing the land for farming and grazing. As in the other towns in western New South Wales market gardening was probably important too. Oral history suggests Chinese remained in the area until the 1950s as market gardeners; however, there is no longer a Chinese community in Nyngan.

=== Chinese burial practices ===
The Chinese saying "'upon the roots of the tree rest falling leaves" expresses a desire to be buried near their home village and relatives. The proximity to relatives would allow them to burn offerings to the deceased's soul and complete the rites that could bring the family fortune. Conversely, if they were not performed correctly, the family fortune could be damaged. Chinese living outside of China tried to followed similar burial rituals. As it was mainly single men who came to Australia, it was often not the family who managed the interment of the deceased. This caused variations to occur from place to place; however, basic core ritual and practice applied. When a Chinese person died overseas, the ritual required steps be taken to restore the deceased to their home village in China.

The rituals aimed to familiarise the soul of the deceased with the underworld and to do this the body was buried for around seven years. At this time the body was exhumed, the bones placed in an urn and then either returned to China or the bones reburied. As the bones of deceased Chinese were usually exhumed, burials in Australia were usually shallow, approximately 500mm. Family name or village associations took on the responsibility of returning the deceased's bones to their home village for re-interment.

Chinese funerary rituals include presenting offerings to the deceased's spirit by descendants and burners were frequently constructed in cemeteries to enable this. They are often brick or masonry structures and usually around 2,100 millimetres (83 in) tall. They serve as a safe place for the ritualised burning of spiritual tributes, such as paper facsimiles of money, clothing, possessions and houses. Burning these items passes them to the spirit realm, and they are to serve the deceased in the after life. Burners range from the modest to elaborate. Many Chinese burners in Victoria are quite lavish in comparison to those in other localities.

There are other burners associated with Chinese cemeteries in Australia and overseas. The brick burner at Nyngan is, by Australian standards, at the functional and modest end of the spectrum. In New South Wales, examples of modest burners can be found in Tumut, Albury and Deniliquin, although these three burners display more complex brick work around the opening and vents than the Nyngan burner. The burner in closest geographical proximity to Nyngan is at Condobolin. Modest burners are also characteristic of Chinese cemeteries on the west coast of the United States of America and the Nyngan example bears a striking resemblance to those constructed in the Auburn Cemetery, California. There are grander examples of Chinese burners in Ballarat, Beechworth and Maldon in Victoria and Wagga Wagga in New South Wales, although the Wagga Wagga example pales in comparison with those in Victoria. The burner at Beechworth has two towers capped with high metal spires. The burner at Maldon cemetery is a triple domed burner in brick. In all, five burners have been officially identified in New South Wales (Tumut, Albury, Deniliquin, Condobolin and Wagga Wagga). They are relatively rare, as many communities constructed burners from wood, covered in tar. Such structures are not durable, being susceptible to fire and rot.

According to local anecdotal evidence the burners at Nyngan and Condobolin were used for cooked (or cooking) food offerings. In the Condobolin High School report (1988), wine, rice, pork and cakes were named. This corresponds to Chinese grave practices reported in Hong Kong.

Altars and bone houses are other structures commonly found in Chinese cemeteries, although neither are present at Nyngan and no examples have been formally identified in New South Wales to date (Wagga Wagga Chinese cemetery does contain an altar, but it is of more recent construction, perhaps 1970s). Altars are predominantly in larger cemeteries and may be a generic marker for unmarked graves. Bone houses were constructed to store bones before transportation back to China in urns. Such structures may also provide an enclosed space for cleaning the bones.

Grave markers, as in European cemeteries, were important features of Chinese cemeteries to identify the deceased for those who came to disinter the bones and as a marker for the descendants practising ritual observances. The text on the marker has, as a minimum, the name of the individual, date of death and the name of the deceased's home village. The name is usually in the middle with the other details on either side. Women's graves were often unmarked, and in overseas communities some female remains were not exhumed.

Stone is the most common material for grave markers in Australia in the nineteenth century, but concrete becomes increasingly common in the twentieth century. Wooden markers existed at some cemeteries in Australia, such as Rookwood Cemetery, however they are vulnerable to fire and decay. Some Chinese graves in Australia have iron railings, such as Gladstone in Tasmania; however this was a rare luxury. Date and location play a role in the design of grave markers. Rectangular markers are the most common type in Australia, but there are variants such as curved or Norman tops. The collection of graves at Nyngan is rare as all the extant markers are of a traditional shape and style. Other Chinese cemeteries identified by the Chinese Australian Cultural Heritage Project (2005) either contained fewer markers or contained markers of a more European style.

Many overseas Chinese cemeteries exhibit feng shui characteristics, influencing their location and orientation. The layout of cemeteries implies order and purpose; however this may be obscured by neglect or vandalism. The markers at Beechworth and the old and new cemeteries at Ballarat in Victoria are all arranged in very neat rows. The nine Chinese grave markers at Nyngan Cemetery were not initially lined up in a row, but were randomly placed around the eastern area of the cemetery, north of the Presbyterian Section and west of the Catholic Section. Bogan Shire Council relocated the markers to their current location in the early 1990s and placed them in a row near the burner, similar to other Chinese cemeteries. The relocation of the markers may have been to create space for a new lawn cemetery to the east of the extant Chinese section.

Bogan Shire Council recorded the names and dates the ten extant grave markers in 1994. Carbon rubbings were taken and reduced to an A4 size sheet. They were then scanned and sent for translation by colleagues in Singapore (c/- Dr Kenson Kwok, Museum of Asian Civilization). Chen Jiazi and Regine Aw rendered the translations in "Hanyu Pinyin" romanisation. Nine markers date from 1914 to 1918. The final marker commemorates the death of No Wood on 23/6/1924. The "tributes", such as poetry, were only in English. Since the recording of the markers it has been reported that one has gone missing, although it is not clear which one.

The Bogan Shire Council, as administrators of the Cemetery, hold a card system registry of burials, which has been computerised. The registry lists 13 names in the Chinese section: Al Chung (4 September 1920, 50 years), Wung Chung (10 October 1941, 65 years), Fang Dong (2 April 1928, years 61), Hay Kee (19 July 1923, years 67), Lui Key (19 July 1923, years 83), Ah Lui (27 May 1929, years 65), Ma Mong (22 September 1945, years 81), Day Ping (27 February 1921, years 69), Wong Quay (28 August 1929, years 61), Yee War (4 November 1952, years 100), Ah Wood (23 June 1924, years 68), Say Yee (1 July 1928, years 73) and Honb You (25 February 1945, years 76).

The burial of No Wood is the only marker that also occurs in the burial registry, under the name Ah Wood. The lack of correspondence between the English and Chinese name is probably due to the imperfect understanding of Chinese tones by the person devising the English version. There is also a strong possibility that the people concerned used the dialect versions of their Mandarin names (same character but different pronunciation).

Although the first recorded burial in the Nyngan Cemetery (in the Church of England Section) was in 1878, it appears that Chinese burials were not recorded until the death of Wood in 1924. Another possibility is that the markers that remain have had the bones exhumed and the card relating to the burial was removed from the registry at this time, although this raises the question of why the markers were left behind. The names listed in the registry, for which there are no markers, could have one of two explanations. The first is that the graves were unmarked or were marked with wood, which has rotten away. The second explanation is that these bodies were exhumed, but the record not deleted from the registry. A ground penetrating radar survey would be able to clarify the status of these burials. It seems likely, however, that the record keeping for the Chinese section of the Cemetery was not fastidious.

== Description ==
Nyngan Cemetery is located at the eastern end of the town of Nyngan, on Cemetery Road, off Pangee Street. The Chinese section is on the far western side, away from the other sections (Methodist, Church of England, Catholic, Presbyterian, two lawned areas) of the cemetery and beside Cemetery Road. Bogan Shire Council relocated the Chinese grave markers in the early 1990s, removing them from their original context. The graves have been relocated in an orderly manner near the burner.

The burner is of brick construction with a square footprint of 2,100 millimetres (83 in), it stands 2,150 millimetres (85 in) high and has a stepped roof of nine brick courses. On the north side an opening has been created by leaving out six horizontally arranged bricks. The opening allows access to a metal grated area where offerings can be placed for incineration. The grate is raised off the ground to allow air to flow underneath. Vents in the remaining three sides have been formed by leaving out two half and one whole brick. The burner tapers to a single brick size hole (flue) at the top.

In the twenty-first century the existing Chinese grave markers are lined up in a single row facing north. Each stone is roughly 700 millimetres (28 in) high. They are evenly spaced and extend approximately 14 metres (46 ft) from the burner, the opening of which also faces north. Behind the row of markers are three indentations in the ground, indicating where three additional grave markers may have once stood. Bogan Shire Council recorded the names and dates on each gravestone in 1994; 10 names were recorded. Since then one marker has been lost.

Of the stones, six are sandstone or limestone, with the balance made up of two marble and one red granite. All the stones are roughly rectangular, however, one has a flat round top, five are evenly rounded, and the remaining three have bevelled or tapered shaped tops. The markers are inscribed in Mandarin and English – the names being in Mandarin and the poetry or tributes (where included) in English. The translated inscriptions are as follows: one of the stones has gone missing since the survey was undertaken in 1994, it is unclear which one:

"Kime Moon In Loving Memory We never knew what pain he bore. We never saw him die. We only know he passed away and never said goodbye."

Grave of Mr. Tan Qi Wen 10/10/1915 "aged 61 years from Tiau he Boa Ping Village."

"Man Foon" (no English) Grave of Mr. Wu Wau Kuan 14/01/1915 78 years

"Yee You Chung Grave of Mr Yu Yao Wen Yu village second month early spring 1914 Lunar date."

"No Wood Grave of Mr Wu Ya Huo Born in Yao County. Lived in Mei Village, Liang City. 23/06/1924 aged 68 years."

"Wong Han Soy" (none -illegible -) 21/07/1916

(Possibly "Lee How") (-illegible-) 22/07/1916? Aged 84 years "He was a loving godfather and we loved him ardently. Through his life above all things in the world, He desired love."

"Young Yee" (none) "Grave of Mr Young Xiang Country, Long City Shen Ming Ting (village) 12/11/1918 aged 33 years"

"Sung Jim" (none) (not translated) 11/05/1918 78 years

"Jung Sing" (none)

"Grave of Mr Zhang Gui County 03/01/1913 aged 60 years".

=== Condition ===
Since Bogan Shire Council recorded the details of the Chinese grave markers in 1994 there has been some deterioration. One stone is now broken in half, two are cracked across the middle and two have fallen. One is missing altogether. The three stones that appear to be in the best condition also happen to be the three tapered stones on the western end. They are mounted on what appear to be original shaped stone bases. Some of the stones appear to have repairs carried out.

As at 31 March 2004, the site has high archaeological potential, particularly as it is unknown if the bodies associated with the Chinese grave markers were exhumed, as was normal practice.

Glass and ceramic fragments are frequently found on or near non-grassy ground surfaces at relatively undisturbed Chinese cemetery sites as evidence of ritual offering practices. Archaeological excavation could reveal similar artefactual evidence.

Nine of the original ten grave markers remain. Although they were moved to their present location in the early 1990s, they are relatively intact and are arranged in a similar fashion to other Chinese grave markers (in a neat row).

=== Modifications and dates ===
Bogan Shire Council moved the Chinese grave markers to their current location during the early 1990s.

== Heritage listing ==
As at 17 July 2007, the Chinese section of the Nyngan General Cemetery is of State significance as one of the largest collections of Chinese grave stones in association with a burner in the State. Consisting of nine grave stones (formerly ten), the Nyngan graves are located near a brick burner used to burn food and money offerings to the souls of the dead. The burner itself is of State significance. While not being a lavish example, it is of an unusual design, also found in California and is indicative of adaptations made by Chinese to life outside their country. The burner and markers are evidence of Chinese funerary practices as carried out in New South Wales and provide research potential regarding the number of burials exhumed and returned to China.

Chinese Graves and Burner at Nyngan Cemetery was listed on the New South Wales State Heritage Register on 13 March 2009 having satisfied the following criteria:

The place is important in demonstrating the course, or pattern, of cultural or natural history in New South Wales.

The Nyngan Chinese graves and burner are of State significance as reminder of Chinese occupation in the central west and the contribution they made to the establishment of this area. The Chinese in Nyngan provided an important labour pool to the early township as tree clearers, ring-barkers and local market gardeners. In these capacities the Chinese made land available for pastoralists and experiments in wheat cropping, which took place early in the twentieth century. The Bogan Shire remains heavily reliant on agriculture and pastoralism, made possible through the clearing of the land.

The Nyngan Chinese graves and burner are of State significance as evidence of Chinese burial practices as they were carried out in Australia and the adaptations made to the new conditions. The Chinese saying "upon the roots of the tree rest falling leaves" expresses a desire to be buried with their ancestors, allowing their relatives to look after their spirit with burnt offerings. Burial is an important ritual, and if it is done well it can bring great fortune, but if performed incorrectly can lead to bad fortune for the family. It was important to acclimatise the decease's spirit to the Underworld and to achieve this the body would be buried for around seven years. At the end of this time it could be exhumed, the bones placed in an urn and transported back to their home village, where they are re-interred. Chinese burials were, as a result, shallow, approximately 0.5 metres (1 ft 8 in) deep.

The place is important in demonstrating aesthetic characteristics and/or a high degree of creative or technical achievement in New South Wales.

The burner is of some significance as it is of an unusually simple design, by Australian standards. Many Australian Chinese communities were affluent as a result of success on the goldfields or in commerce and therefore built elaborate burners. The Nyngan example reflects the economic status of the community and is aesthetically distinctive as a functional and modest burner.

The graves at Nyngan are of some aesthetic significance as rare a collection of markers in a traditional shape and style.

The place has strong or special association with a particular community or cultural group in New South Wales for social, cultural or spiritual reasons.

The graves are of State significance to the Chinese community of New South Wales for the reminder they provide of the far reaching and wide contribution Chinese made to the State, not just in towns and cities, but also in opening up land for future uses, in this case through the clearing of land for agricultural and pastoral purposes. The Chinese in these small, and probably isolated, communities continued to practice the traditional rites associated with death. The grave markers and burner in Nyngan Cemetery have a special associations with the Chinese community and the families of the deceased, as the resting place for those individuals who lived and worked in the area. It is not known if the bodies buried with the grave markers were exhumed, therefore they may still be buried in this area.

The graves are of local cultural significance for the residents of Nyngan, who still remember the Chinese and their activities in the town.

The place has potential to yield information that will contribute to an understanding of the cultural or natural history of New South Wales.

The Chinese burner is of State significance for its potential to yield further information on the practices associated with Chinese cemeteries, such as burning items for offerings. Although there are several examples of Chinese burners throughout Australia and overseas, each is slightly different in appearance, due to available materials, community resources and the person(s) who constructed it. It is unclear how many of the bodies have been exhumed and returned to China, where the graves were originally located and whether additional persons (beyond the ten known grave markers and those in the cemetery records) were buried in the cemetery.

The place possesses uncommon, rare or endangered aspects of the cultural or natural history of New South Wales.

The Nyngan graves and burner are of State significance as a rare physical reminder of the presence of Chinese in Central West and Western New South Wales. With many Chinese communities no longer living in these areas more ephemeral forms of evidence no longer exist. The burner is rare in its own right. Currently five others have been identified in New South Wales, but none in association with such a large number of grave markers, the markers at other cemeteries having been removed or destroyed over time.

The place is important in demonstrating the principal characteristics of a class of cultural or natural places/environments in New South Wales.

The Nyngan graves and burner are of State significance as representative of Chinese burial practices in Australia. It is the largest and most traditional collection of markers in association with a burner in NSW. The markers are traditional in their shape and their use of Mandarin, although some also have English text, and their use of stone rather than concrete as a material. The burner is representative of the simple style of burner erected by smaller Chinese communities. Comparisons with Wagga and Deniliquin suggest the Nyngan burner is typical of the style built by Chinese communities primarily engaged in agricultural or labouring employment. The Nyngan example is not as elaborate as those on the rich goldfields of Ballarat and Bendigo, where incomes were potentially higher and the community larger, subsequently they were able to afford the construction of more elaborate burners.

The Chinese section of the Nyngan Cemetery is of State significance as a representative example of the common practice of designating specific section of cemeteries for the burial of Chinese. In many towns the Chinese section was separated from the Christian sections on the request of the European community and are lingering evidence of the racial vilification suffered by Chinese immigrants.
