= 40th meridian east =

Line of longitude

40th meridian east

The meridian 40° east of Greenwich is a line of longitude that extends from the North Pole across the Arctic Ocean, Europe, Asia, Africa, the Indian Ocean, the Southern Ocean, and Antarctica to the South Pole. The meridian is used in some contexts to delineate Europe or what is associated with the continent of Europe as an easternmost limit, e.g. to qualify for membership of the European Broadcasting Union.

The 40th meridian east forms a great circle with the 140th meridian west.

== From Pole to Pole ==
Starting at the North Pole and heading south to the South Pole, the 40th meridian east passes through:

Co-ordinates	Country, territory or sea	Notes
90°0′N 40°0′E	Arctic Ocean	
80°27′N 40°0′E	Barents Sea	
67°49′N 40°0′E	Russia	Island of Ostrov Lumbovskiy and the Kola Peninsula
66°25′N 40°0′E	White Sea	
65°49′N 40°0′E	Russia	
65°10′N 40°0′E	White Sea	Dvina Bay
64°45′N 40°0′E	Russia	
49°36′N 40°0′E	Ukraine	
49°9′N 40°0′E	Russia	
48°53′N 40°0′E	Ukraine	For about 10km
48°48′N 40°0′E	Russia	
48°17′N 40°0′E	Ukraine	For about 6km
48°13′N 40°0′E	Russia	Passing east of Adler, less than a kilometer west of the border with Georgia (at 43°24′N 40°0′E)
43°23′N 40°0′E	Black Sea	
40°57′N 40°0′E	Turkey	
36°49′N 40°0′E	Syria	
33°57′N 40°0′E	Iraq	
32°1′N 40°0′E	Saudi Arabia	
20°15′N 40°0′E	Red Sea	
16°3′N 40°0′E	Eritrea	Dahlak Archipelago and the mainland
14°27′N 40°0′E	Ethiopia	
3°56′N 40°0′E	Kenya	
3°22′S 40°0′E	Indian Ocean	Passing just east of the islands of Pemba, Latham and Mafia, Tanzania
10°8′S 40°0′E	Tanzania	
10°49′S 40°0′E	Mozambique	
16°12′S 40°0′E	Indian Ocean	Passing between the atoll of Bassas da India and Europa Island, French Southern and Antarctic Lands
60°0′S 40°0′E	Southern Ocean	
68°52′S 40°0′E	Antarctica	Queen Maud Land, claimed by Norway

== See also ==
- 39th meridian east
- 41st meridian east
