= Nyngan Court House =

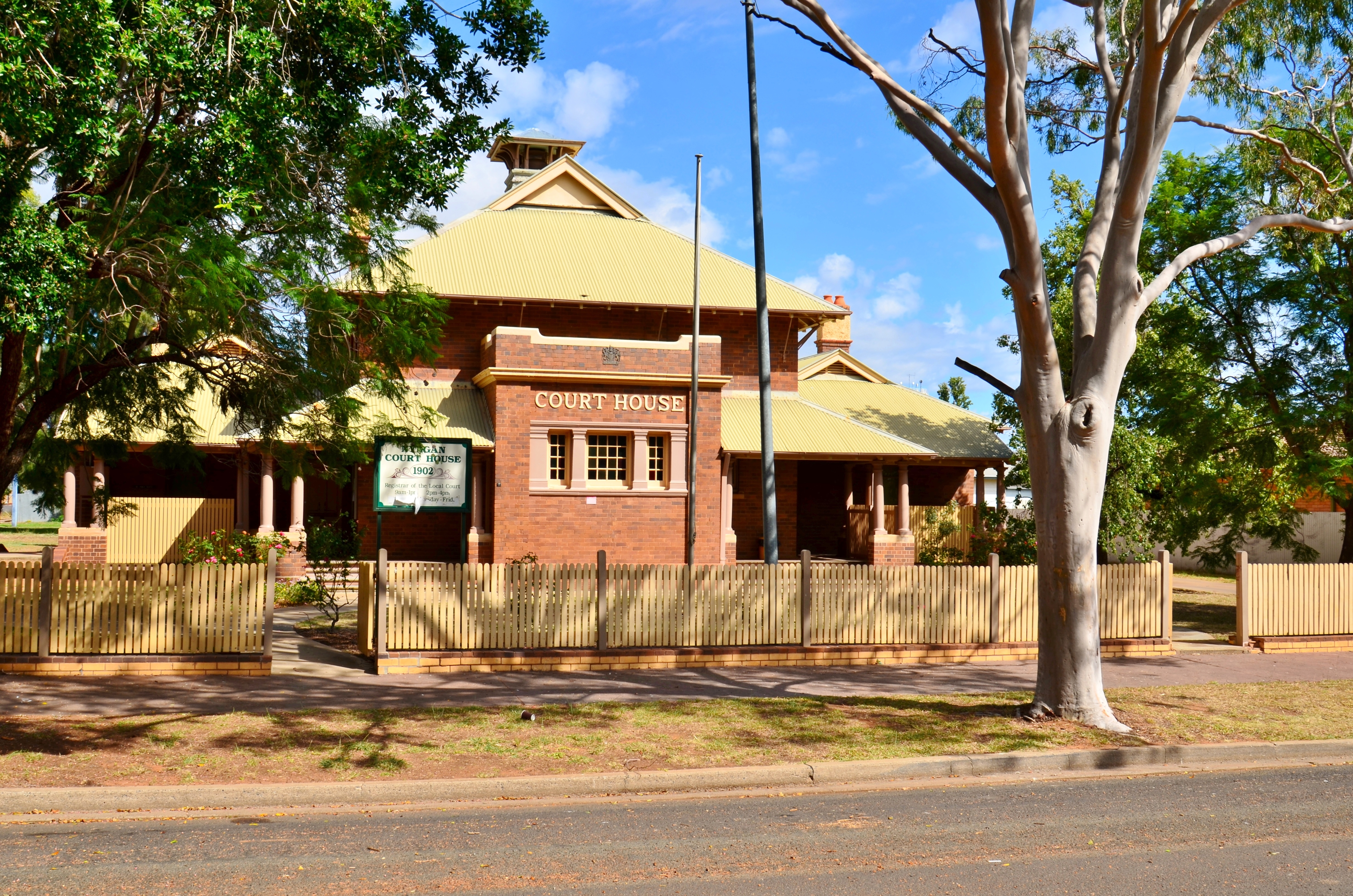
- The Nyngan Court House, pictured in 2017

- Location within New South Wales Location within Australia
- 31°33′49″S 147°11′38″E
- Location: 77–79 Cobar Street, Nyngan, Bogan Shire, New South Wales, Australia

History
- Built: 1902

Site notes
- Architect: Walter Liberty Vernon
- Architectural style: Federation Arts and Crafts
- Owner: Department of Communities and Justice

New South Wales Heritage Register
- Official name: Nyngan Court House
- Type: State heritage (built)
- Designated: 2 April 1999
- Reference no.: 797
- Type: Law court
- Category: Law enforcement

Nyngan Court House is a heritage-listed courthouse located at 77–79 Cobar Street, Nyngan, in the Bogan Shire, New South Wales, Australia. It was designed by Walter Liberty Vernon and built in 1902. The property is owned by NSW Department of Justice. It was added to the New South Wales State Heritage Register on 2 April 1999.

== History ==
The Nyngan Court House was designed by the Government Architect Walter Libery Vernon in 1902.

== Description ==
The Nyngan Court House is an attractive public building. Designed in the Federation Arts and Crafts style using the established Court House plan layout, the building incorporates wide overhanging eaves and surrounding verandahs to suit the hot and dry outback climate. The central double-height court room and adjoining wings have hipped roofs and surrounding verendahs supported on columns with half-height brick piers. An enclosed central entrance has a raised parapet and multipanelled glazing. The Nyngan Court House is constructed in face brick with rendered brick details. The hipped roofs are clad in corrugated iron.

Other accommodation includes general office, library, two jury rooms, judge/magistrates chambers, Crown prosecutors room, legal room, and witness room.

== Heritage listing ==
As at 27 May 2016, the Nyngan Court House was an attractive Federation Free Style civic building which makes a considerable contribution to the heritage fabric of the town. The building has a lengthy association with the provision of justice in the district.

Nyngan Court House was listed on the New South Wales State Heritage Register on 2 April 1999.

== See also ==
- Courthouses in New South Wales
