= Rod Wright (rugby league) =

Australian rugby league footballer

Personal information
- Full name: Rodney Wright
- Born: Nyngan, New South Wales, Australia

Playing information
- Position: Lock, Loose forward
Club
Years	Team	Pld	T	G	FG	P
1981–83	Penrith	45	15	0	0	47
- As of 13 Jul 2021

Rodney Wright (born in Nyngan, New South Wales) is an Australian former professional rugby league footballer, a lock forward with the Penrith Panthers in the National Rugby League competition.

== Sources ==
- Whiticker, Alan & Hudson, Glen (2006) The Encyclopedia of Rugby League Players, Gavin Allen Publishing, Sydney
