= Nioki Airport =

Nioki Airport Aéroport de Nioki
- IATA: NIO; ICAO: FZBI

Summary
- Airport type: Public
- Location: Nioki, Democratic Republic of the Congo
- Elevation AMSL: 1,043 ft / 318 m
- Coordinates: 02°43′03″S 17°41′05″E

Map
- Location within DRC

Runways
Direction	Length		Surface
Direction	m	ft	Surface
11/29	1,430	4,692	Gravel
- Sources: GCM Google Maps

Nioki Airport (IATA: NIO, ICAO: FZBI) is an airport in Nioki, Democratic Republic of the Congo.

== Airlines and destinations ==
Airlines	Destinations
Kin Avia	Kinshasa–N'Dolo

== See also ==
- Transport in the Democratic Republic of the Congo
- List of airports in the Democratic Republic of the Congo
