= 41st meridian east =

Line of longitude

41st meridian east (interactive map)

The meridian 41° east of Greenwich is a line of longitude that extends from the North Pole across the Arctic Ocean, Europe, Asia, Africa, the Indian Ocean, the Southern Ocean, and Antarctica to the South Pole.

Part of the border between Kenya and Somalia runs about 1 km west of the meridian, parallel to it.

The 41st meridian east forms a great circle with the 139th meridian west.

== From Pole to Pole ==
Starting at the North Pole and heading south to the South Pole, the 41st meridian east passes through:

Co-ordinates	Country, territory or sea	Notes
90°0′N 41°0′E	Arctic Ocean	
80°29′N 41°0′E	Barents Sea	
67°40′N 41°0′E	Russia	Kola Peninsula
66°43′N 41°0′E	White Sea	
66°0′N 41°0′E	Russia	
43°26′N 41°0′E	Abkhazia or Georgia	Abkhazia is a partially recognised state. Most nations consider its territory to be part of Georgia. Passing through Sukhumi.
43°0′N 41°0′E	Black Sea	
41°12′N 41°0′E	Turkey	
37°7′N 41°0′E	Syria	
34°25′N 41°0′E	Iraq	
31°37′N 41°0′E	Saudi Arabia	
19°20′N 41°0′E	Red Sea	
15°34′N 41°0′E	Eritrea	Dahlak Archipelago
15°33′N 41°0′E	Red Sea	
14°40′N 41°0′E	Eritrea	
13°57′N 41°0′E	Ethiopia	
4°6′N 41°0′E	Kenya	
2°50′N 41°0′E	Somalia	The meridian runs parallel to the border with Kenya, which is about 1 km to the west
0°50′S 41°0′E	Kenya	Mainland and Pate Island
2°12′S 41°0′E	Indian Ocean	Passing just east of the Mozambique coast
60°0′S 41°0′E	Southern Ocean	
68°38′S 41°0′E	Antarctica	Queen Maud Land, claimed by Norway

== See also ==
- 40th meridian east
- 42nd meridian east
