= Numbulwar Airport =

- IATA: NUB; ICAO: YNUM

Summary
- Airport type: Public
- Operator: Numbulwar Numburindi Community Government Council
- Location: Numbulwar, Northern Territory
- Elevation AMSL: 31 ft / 9 m
- Coordinates: 14°16′18″S 135°43′00″E

Map
- Location in Northern Territory

Runways
Direction	Length		Surface
Direction	m	ft	Surface
15/33	1,320	4,331	Asphalt
- Sources: Australian AIP

Numbulwar Airport (IATA: NUB, ICAO: YNUM) is located 1.5 nautical miles (2.8 km; 1.7 mi) west of Numbulwar, Northern Territory, Australia
