= Boundétingou Airport =

Airport in Atakora, Benin

- IATA: NAE; ICAO: DBBN

Summary
- Airport type: Public
- Serves: Natitingou
- Location: Benin
- Elevation AMSL: 1,512 ft (461 m)
- Coordinates: 10°22′37.1″N 1°21′37.8″E

Map
- Location of Boundétingou Airport in Benin

Runways
| Direction | Length | | Surface |
| Direction | m | ft | Surface |
|---|---|---|---|
| 04/22 | 1,189 | 3,900 | DIRT |
- Source: Landings.com

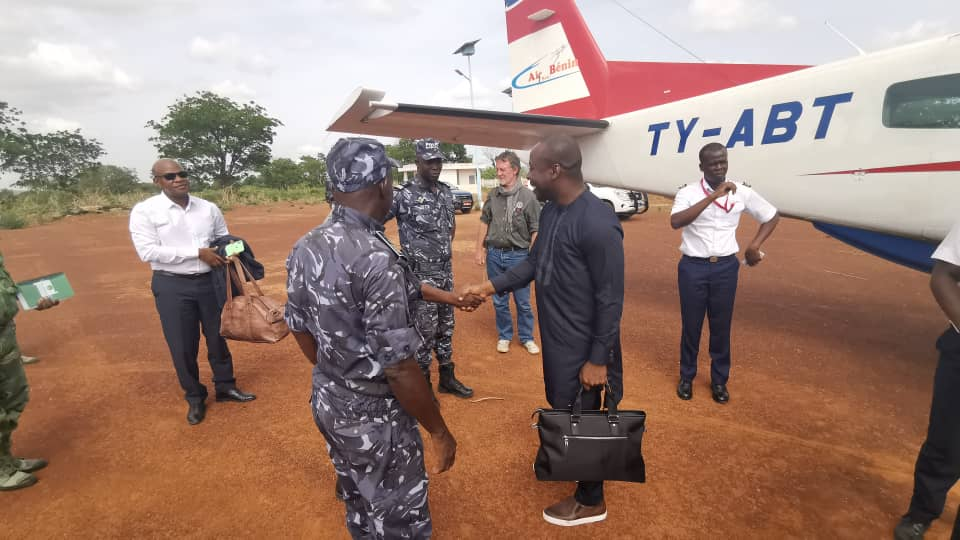

Boundétingou Airport (IATA: NAE, ICAO: DBBN) is a public use airport located near Natitingou, Atakora, Benin.
