= Nkongsamba Airport =

Airport in Cameroon

- IATA: NKS; ICAO: FKAN

Summary
- Airport type: Public
- Serves: Nkongsamba, Cameroon
- Elevation AMSL: 2,641 ft / 805 m
- Coordinates: 04°57′00″N 009°56′00″E

Map
- Location of N'Kongsamba Airport in Cameroon

Runways
Direction	Length		Surface
Direction	m	ft	Surface
	730	2,395
- Source: Great Circle Mapper

Nkongsamba Airport (IATA: NKS, ICAO: FKAN) is an airport serving Nkongsamba, a city in the Moungo department of the Littoral region in Cameroon.

== Facilities ==
The airport resides at an elevation of 2,641 feet (805 m) above mean sea level. It has a runway that is 730 metres (2,395 ft) in length.
