= Nyngan =

- Town
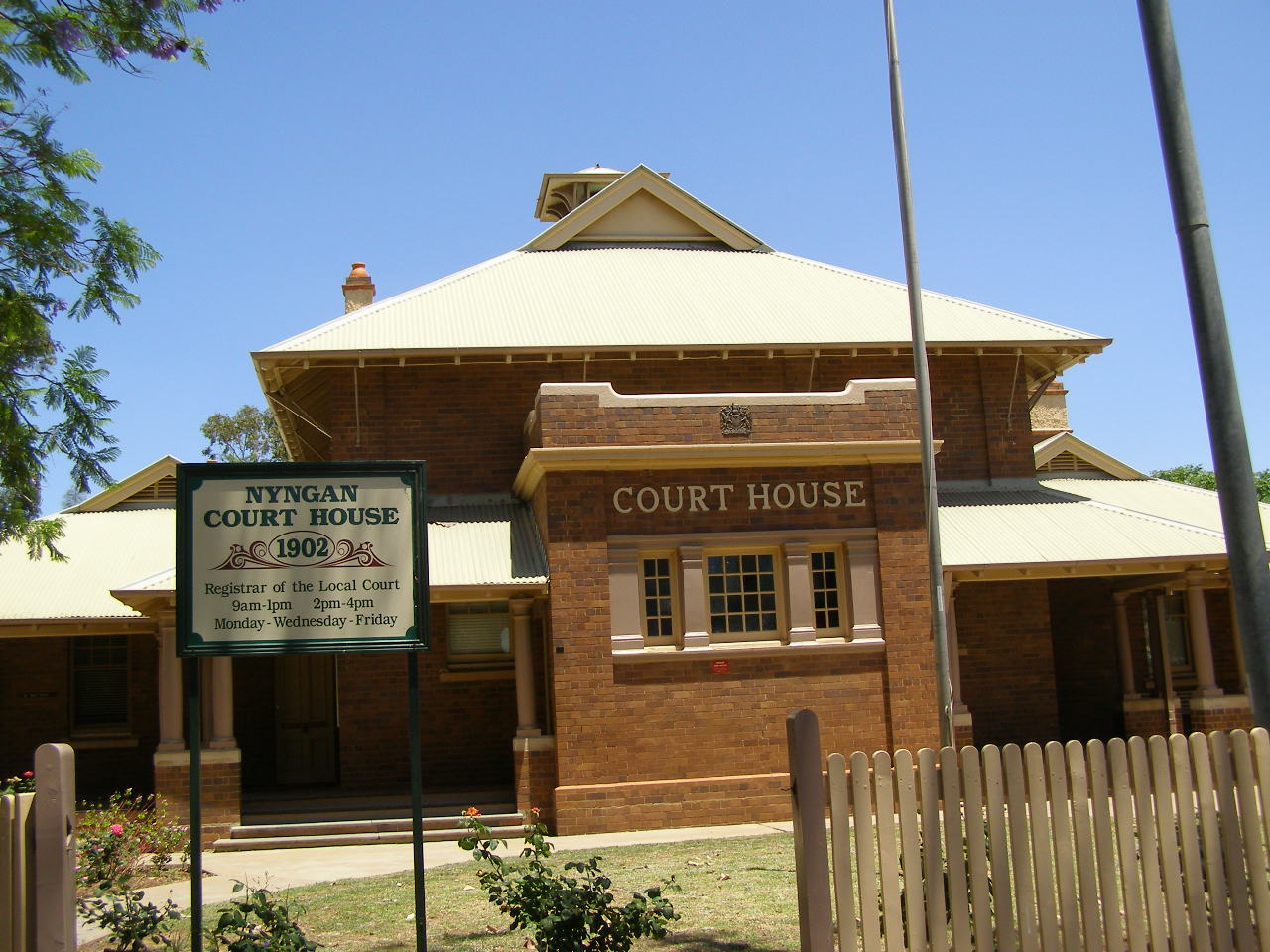
- Court house, Nyngan

- Coordinates: 31°34′0″S 147°12′0″E
- Country: Australia
- State: New South Wales
- LGA: Bogan Shire
- Location: 576 km (358 mi) NW of Sydney; 167 km (104 mi) NW of Dubbo; 133 km (83 mi) E of Cobar; 656 km (408 mi) S of Charleville

Government
  - Mayor: Glen Neill
  - State electorate: Barwon
  - Federal division: Parkes
- Elevation: 173 m (568 ft)

Population
  - Total: 1,953 (2021 census)
- Postcode: 2825
- County: Oxley
- Mean max temp: 25.7 °C (78.3 °F)
- Mean min temp: 11.6 °C (52.9 °F)
- Annual rainfall: 438.9 mm (17.28 in)

Nyngan (/ˈnɪŋɡən/) is a town in the centre of New South Wales, Australia, in the Bogan Shire local government area within the Orana Region of central New South Wales. At the 2016 census, Nyngan had a population of 1,988 people. Nyngan is situated on the Bogan River between Narromine and Bourke, on the junction of the Mitchell Highway and Barrier Highway, 656 km (408 mi) south of Charleville and 576 km (358 mi) north-west of Sydney by road. The Barrier Highway starts at Nyngan, and runs west to Cobar and on through Wilcannia and Broken Hill into South Australia.

Nyngan Airport is a small airport just north of the town centre. Nyngan also lies on the Main Western railway line of New South Wales but is no longer served by passenger trains. The line remains open to freight traffic.

About 70 km (43 mi) south of the town, a cairn was erected in 1988 marking the centre of NSW.

== History ==
The district was originally inhabited by the Wangaibon Peoples. Thomas Mitchell explored the Bogan River in 1835, camping on the future townsite. He recorded the local Aboriginal word nyingan, said to mean 'long pond of water', though other meanings have been put forward, such as mussel or crayfish. Squatters had settled in Mitchell's wake before he had begun his return journey. The town flourished after completion of the railway line in 1883.

The little town of Canonba, 25 kilometres to the north-east on Duck Creek, is part of the history of Nyngan. From the early 1840s until the middle 'eighties, it grew and flourished, servicing Canonba Station and other properties, and Cobb and Co. travellers. In the early 1880s there were about four hotels, three or four banks, various stores and tradesmen, a police station, a telegraph and money-order office, and representatives of churches. The Western Railway by-passed Canonba, and where it crossed the Bogan was Nyngan. The Canonba populace, goods and public institutions then all moved to Nyngan. By 1890 it was practically empty.

The Municipality of Nyngan was proclaimed on 17 February 1891 with Nyngan having a population of 1355.

=== The 1990 Nyngan flood ===
In April 1990, unusually heavy rains (which had caused flooding in Charleville, Queensland with total damages of up to $300 million) caused major flooding in the town, despite a massive effort by local people to raise the levee walls using sandbags. With the town almost completely flooded, all the residents had to be evacuated by helicopter from the railway station, the highest point of the town, which was not flooded. Air Force helicopters, TV news helicopters and private helicopters all co-operated in the airlift. The total damage amounted to $50 million. The airlift is commemorated by an Army helicopter placed outside of the Nyngan Railway Station. The railway station now houses a museum which includes exhibits relating to the 1990 flood. (The station had not been regularly used for train passengers since about 1980; the railway line to Bourke has been out of use since 17 May 1989 but the Cobar line remains open to carry ore and wheat).

== Climate ==
Nyngan experiences a hot semi-arid climate (Köppen: BSh), with long, very hot summers and short, cool winters, with a slight summer peak in rainfall mainly owed to severe thunderstorms. Seasonal range is considerable in both maximum and minimum temperatures.

Climate data for Nyngan Airport (31º33'S, 147º12'E, 173 m AMSL) (1920−2024, rainfall 1879−2024)
Month	Jan	Feb	Mar	Apr	May	Jun	Jul	Aug	Sep	Oct	Nov	Dec	Year
Record high °C (°F)	47.0 (116.6)	47.4 (117.3)	42.2 (108.0)	38.9 (102.0)	31.0 (87.8)	27.2 (81.0)	27.3 (81.1)	33.5 (92.3)	37.5 (99.5)	41.1 (106.0)	45.0 (113.0)	46.0 (114.8)	47.4 (117.3)
Mean daily maximum °C (°F)	34.4 (93.9)	33.4 (92.1)	30.5 (86.9)	25.7 (78.3)	20.7 (69.3)	17.0 (62.6)	16.5 (61.7)	18.6 (65.5)	22.7 (72.9)	26.6 (79.9)	30.1 (86.2)	33.0 (91.4)	25.8 (78.4)
Mean daily minimum °C (°F)	19.7 (67.5)	19.3 (66.7)	16.5 (61.7)	12.0 (53.6)	7.8 (46.0)	5.0 (41.0)	3.8 (38.8)	4.8 (40.6)	7.8 (46.0)	11.5 (52.7)	15.1 (59.2)	17.9 (64.2)	11.8 (53.2)
Record low °C (°F)	8.4 (47.1)	9.4 (48.9)	6.4 (43.5)	1.7 (35.1)	−1.7 (28.9)	−3.9 (25.0)	−4.0 (24.8)	−1.8 (28.8)	−0.5 (31.1)	1.7 (35.1)	4.4 (39.9)	7.8 (46.0)	−4.0 (24.8)
Average rainfall mm (inches)	51.1 (2.01)	46.7 (1.84)	41.9 (1.65)	34.2 (1.35)	35.6 (1.40)	33.7 (1.33)	28.8 (1.13)	29.3 (1.15)	27.4 (1.08)	34.0 (1.34)	36.8 (1.45)	43.0 (1.69)	442.2 (17.41)
Average rainy days (≥ 1.0 mm)	3.9	3.4	3.5	2.8	3.5	4.0	3.8	3.8	3.4	3.9	3.9	3.8	43.7
Average afternoon relative humidity (%)	31	36	37	40	49	55	52	44	38	34	30	29	40
Average dew point °C (°F)	12.8 (55.0)	13.1 (55.6)	11.0 (51.8)	9.4 (48.9)	7.9 (46.2)	6.9 (44.4)	5.4 (41.7)	4.4 (39.9)	5.5 (41.9)	6.4 (43.5)	8.2 (46.8)	9.8 (49.6)	8.4 (47.1)
Source: Bureau of Meteorology (1920–2024 normals and extremes, rainfall 1879–2024)

Historical population
Year	Pop.	±%
1921	1,374	—
1933	1,545	+12.4%
1947	1,802	+16.6%
1954	2,257	+25.2%
1961	2,414	+7.0%
1966	2,591	+7.3%
1971	2,487	−4.0%
1976	2,359	−5.1%
1981	2,485	+5.3%
1986	2,502	+0.7%
1991	2,311	−7.6%
1996	2,240	−3.1%
2001	2,065	−7.8%
2006	1,975	−4.4%
2011	2,073	+5.0%
2016	1,988	−4.1%
2021	1,761	−11.4%
Source: Australian Bureau of Statistics data.

== Heritage listings ==
Nyngan has a number of heritage-listed sites, including:

- Cemetery Road: Chinese Graves and Burner at Nyngan Cemetery
- 77–79 Cobar Street: Nyngan Court House

== Solar power ==
Approximately 10 kilometres (6.2 mi) west of the town is one of Australia's largest photovoltaic power stations, with 1.36 million solar panels. It was the largest solar PV plant in Australia when launched in July 2016. It complements another plant at Broken Hill, which was expected to be fully operational by the end of 2015, for a combined capacity of 155 megawatts (208,000 hp).

== Media ==
The town is serviced by Outback Radio 2WEB on 100.7 MHz.

== Gallery ==
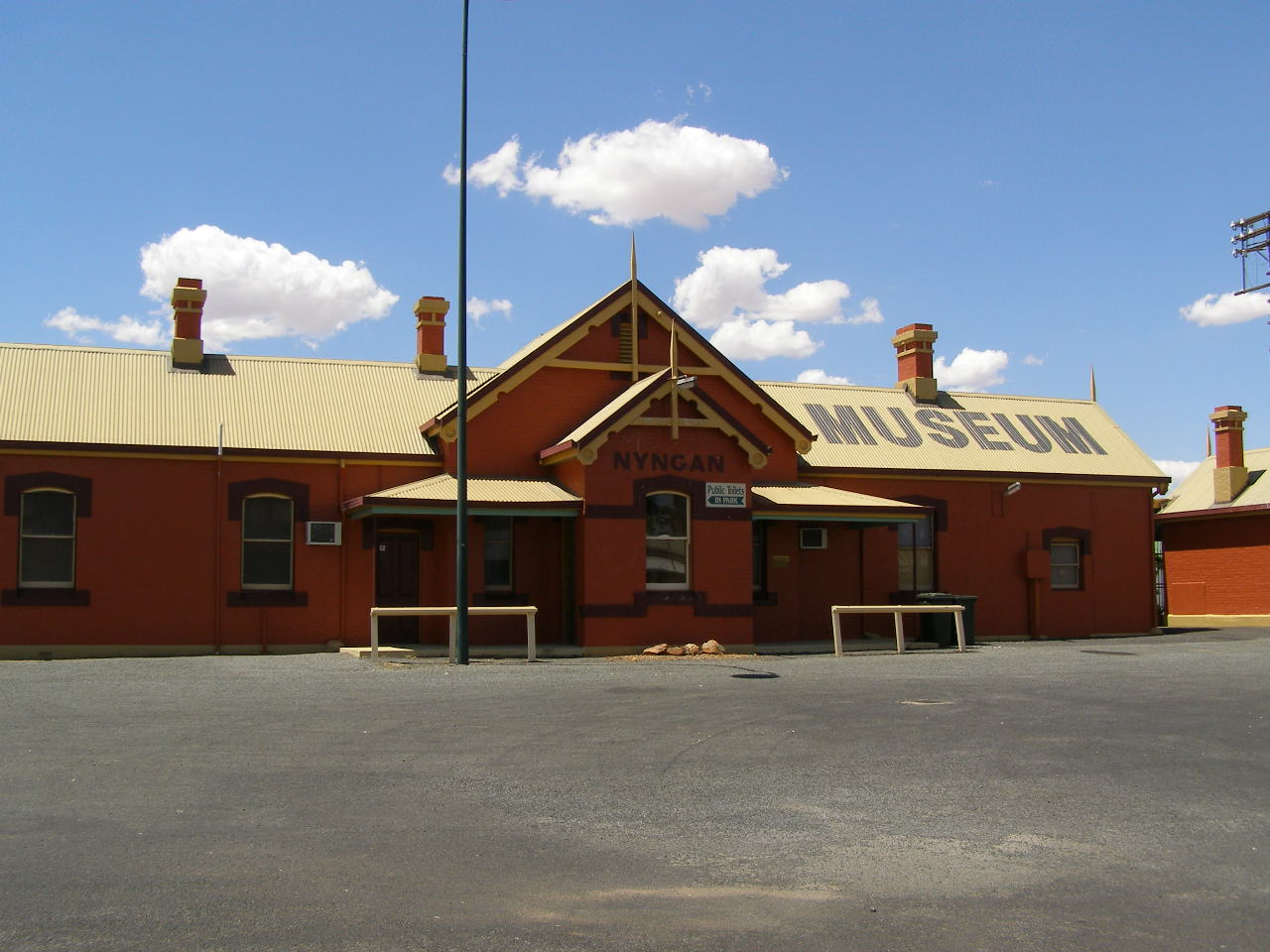
Railway station (now museum), Nyngan

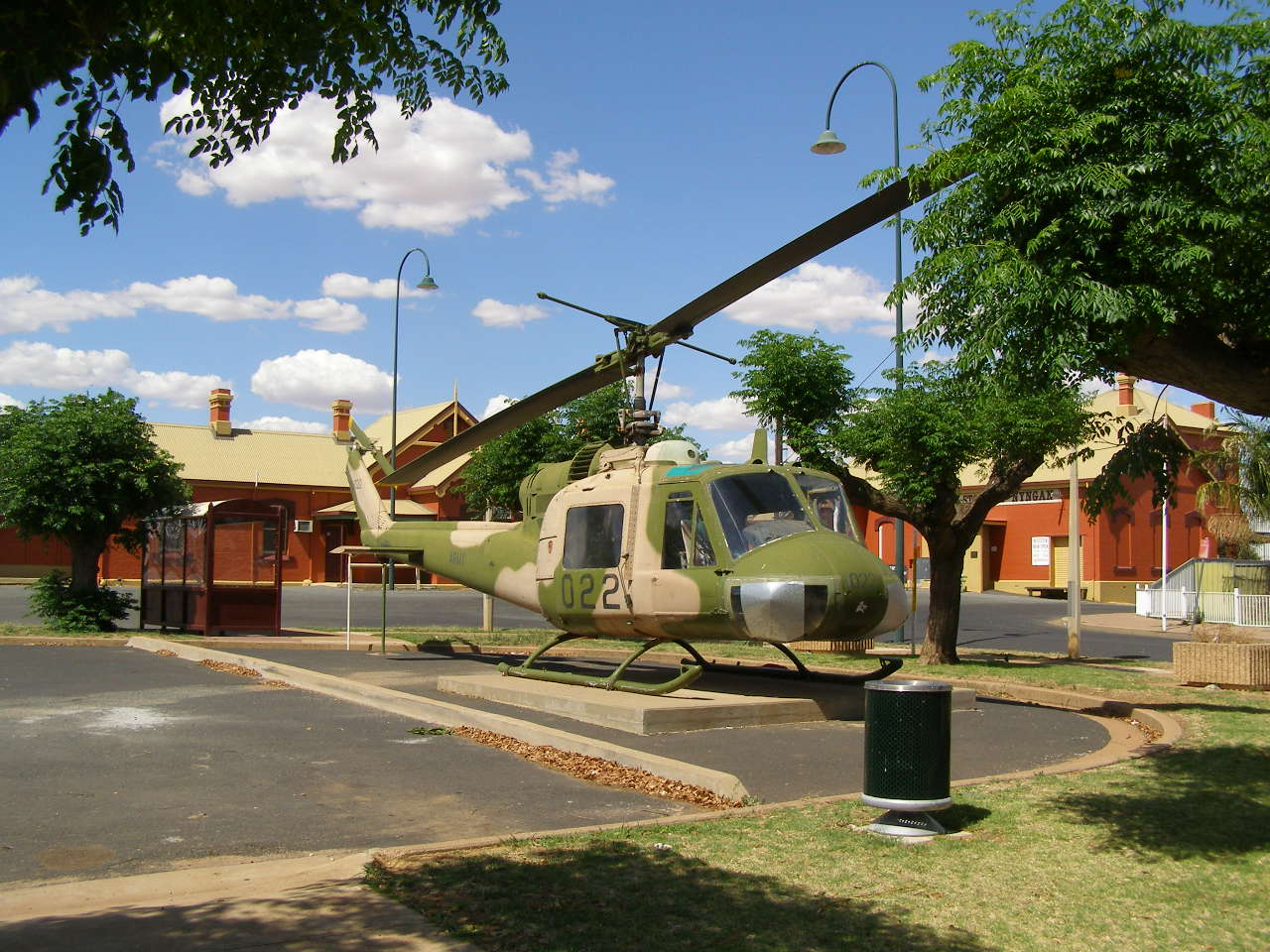
Helicopter commemorating the airlift during the 1990 floods

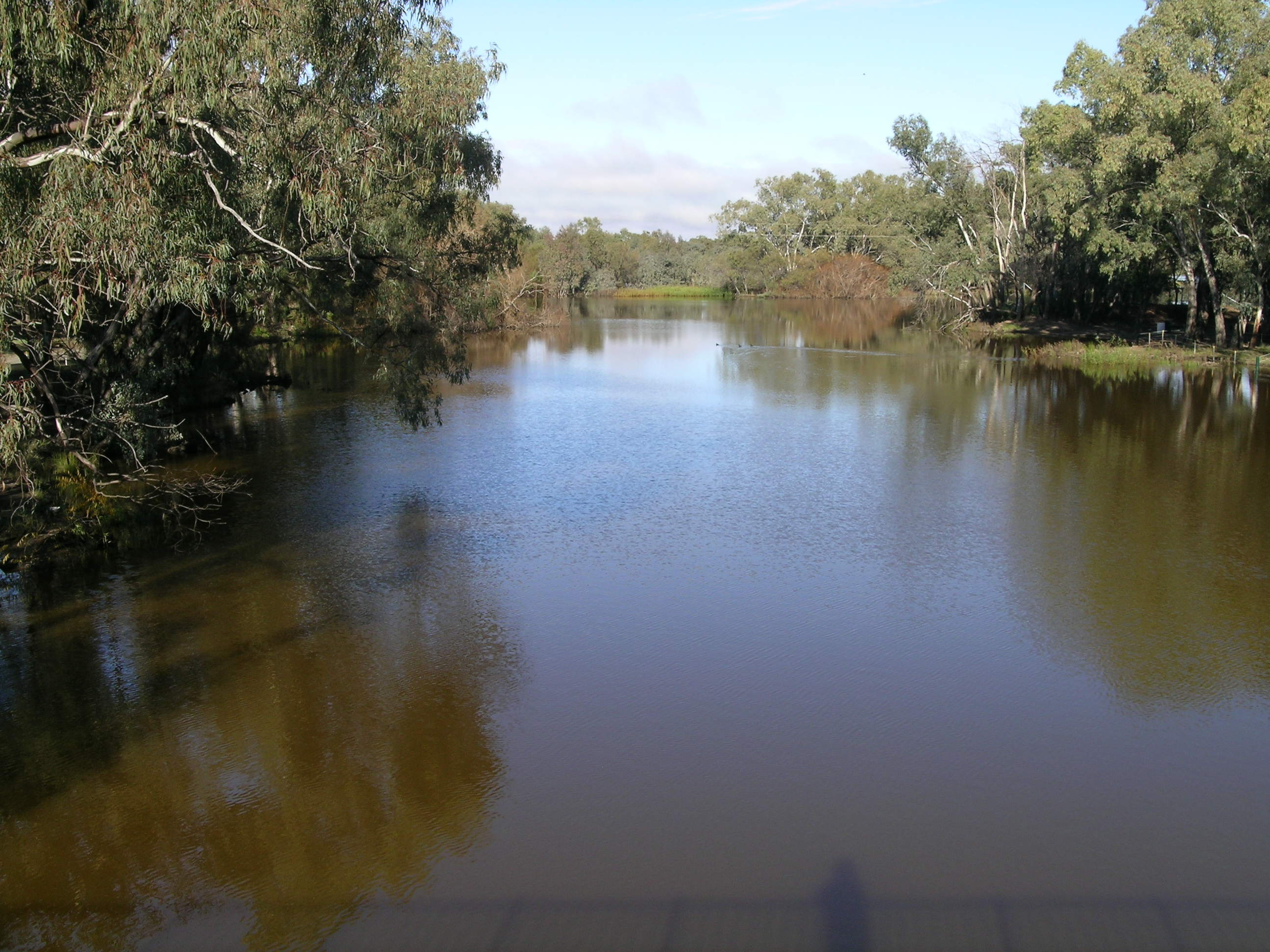
The Bogan River at Nyngan

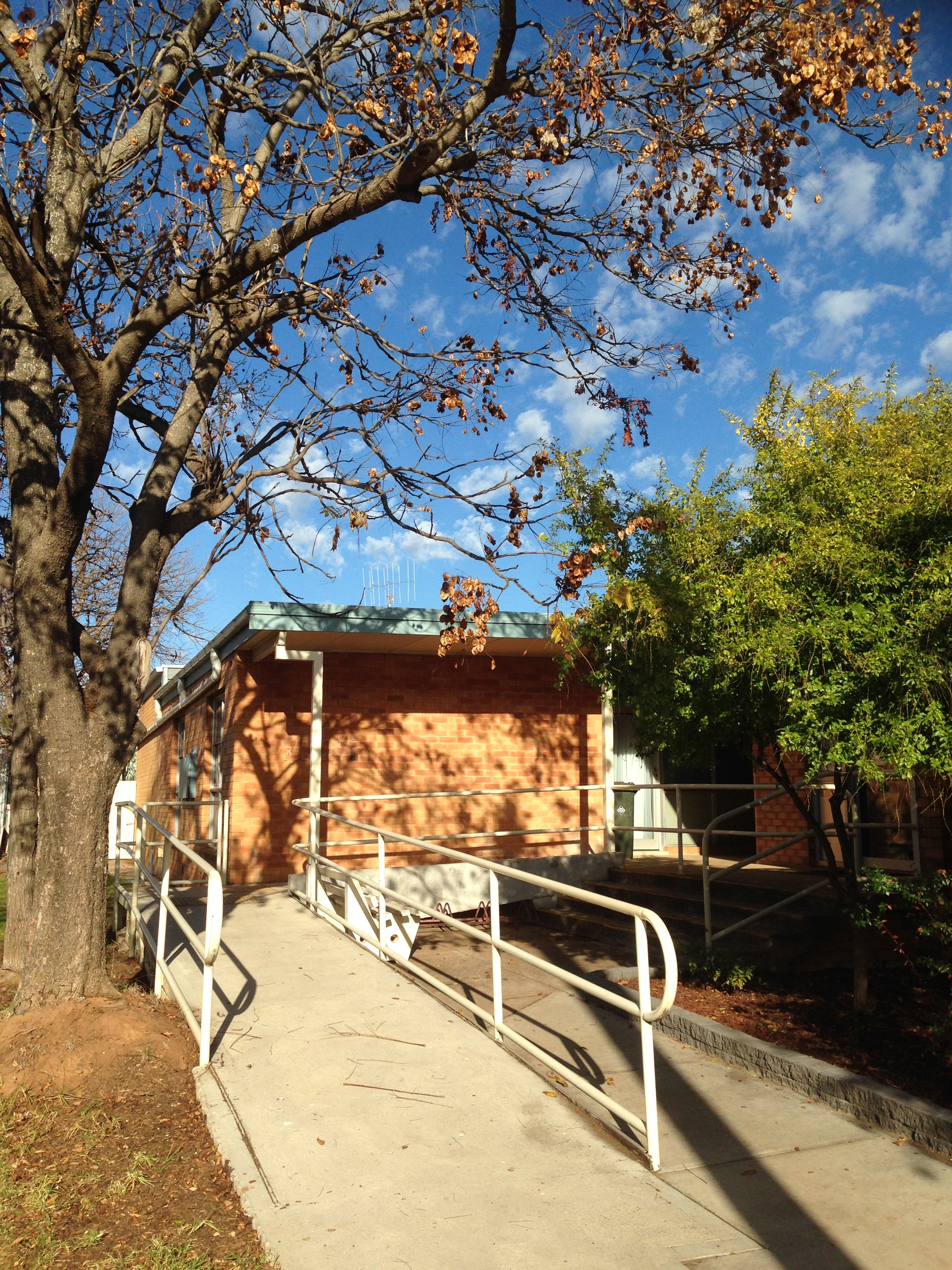
Bogan Shire Library, 73 Cobar Street Nyngan, New South Wales

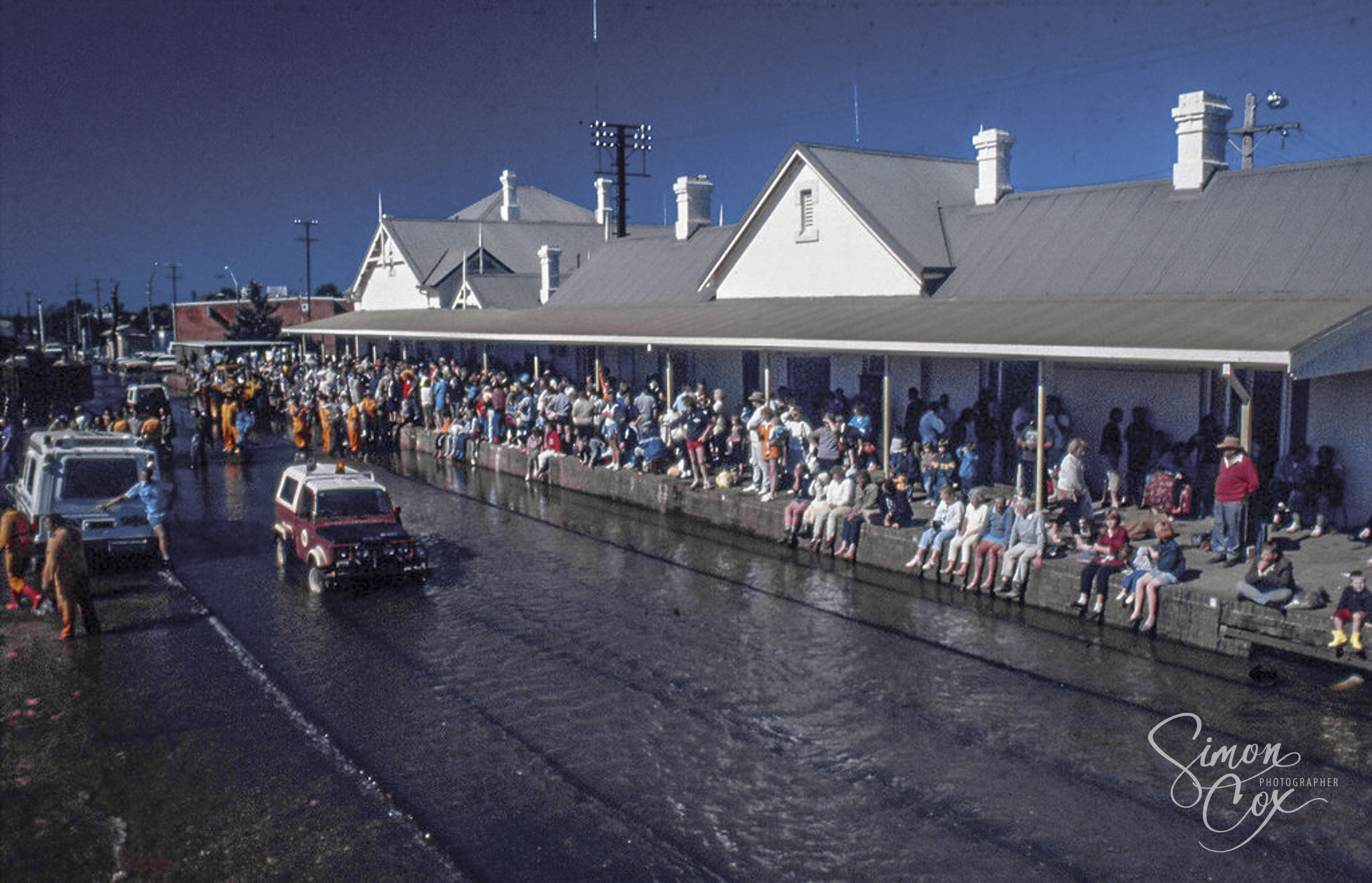
Nyngan railway station during the 1990 evacuation

== Notable people ==
- Bill Lamb – politician – Speaker of the NSW Legislative Assembly
- Rod Wright – rugby league player – played for Penrith Panthers
- Tony McGrane – politician – Independent MP for Dubbo, former mayor of Nyngan
- Austin Enright (known professionally as Austo From The 37) – Rapper – Features on Lil Muz' and blades hit song "The Industrial Rapolution"

Preceding station	Former services	Following station
Girilambone towards Bourke	Main Western Line	Warren towards Sydney
Tikkara towards Cobar	Cobar Line	Terminus
