= Jerry Tyler Memorial Airport =

- IATA: NLE; ICAO: none; FAA LID: 3TR

Summary
- Airport type: Public use
- Operator: City of Niles, Michigan
- Serves: City of Niles, Michigan
- Location: 2018 Lake Street, Niles, Michigan 49120-1241
- Elevation AMSL: 750 ft / 228.6 m
- Coordinates: 41.8407°N 86.2259°W
- Website: City of Niles website

Map
- Location of airport in Michigan 3TR (the United States)

Runways
Direction	Length		Surface
Direction	ft	m	Surface
(15/33)	4,100	1,250	Concrete
(4/22)	3,315	1,010	Concrete

Statistics (2015)
- Aircraft Operations: 20,805
- Based Aircraft: 31
- Source: AirNav

Jerry Tyler Memorial Airport (IATA: NLE, FAA LID: 3TR) is a privately owned airport in Niles, Michigan, United States. It is included in the Federal Aviation Administration (FAA) National Plan of Integrated Airport Systems for 2017–2021, in which it is categorized as a local general aviation facility. It is used primarily by general aviation (GA) traffic.

== Activities ==
The airport is home to regular airshows and special events that showcase rare and vintage aircraft like the Ford Trimotor. Events often allow participants to ride in such aircraft.

The airport is home to a chapter of the Experimental Aircraft Association, which hosts regular events at the airport.

== Facilities and aircraft ==
The airport has two paved runways. Runway 15/33 is 4100 x 75 ft (1250 x 23 m), and runway 4/22 is 3316 x 55 ft (1011 x 17 m).

The airport has a fixed-base operator that offers fuel as well as amenities such as a lounge, snooze rooms, courtesy transportation, and more.

Based on the 12-month period ending December 31, 2015, Jerry Tyler Memorial Airport has 20,805 operations per year, an average of 57 per week. It is composed entirely of general aviation. For the same time period, there were 31 aircraft based at the field: 26 single-engine and 4 multi-engine airplanes and 1 helicopter.

== Accidents and incidents ==
- On March 7, 2002, a Piper PA-28 crashed in instrument conditions after takeoff from Jerry Tyler Memorial. The pilot was not instrument rated and was not operating on an instrument flight plan. The probable cause of the accident was found to be flight into known adverse weather conditions by the pilot and the spatial disorientation of pilot.
- On June 18, 2002, a Hulle Horizon 1 sustained substantial damage when it nosed over after a bounced landing at the Jerry Tyler Memorial Airport. The pilot reported he was flying left-hand traffic patterns for runway 4 and the aircraft bounced on his second landing. He neutralized the controls immediately, but aircraft settled back on grass and nosed over. The probable cause was found to be the pilot's improper recovery from a bounced landing.
- On January 26, 2013, an ultra light aircraft crashed near the airport, killing the pilot.

== See also ==
- List of airports in Michigan
