= Nyngan Airport =

- IATA: NYN; ICAO: YNYN

Summary
- Airport type: Public
- Operator: Bogan Shire Council
- Location: Nyngan, New South Wales
- Elevation AMSL: 569 ft / 173 m
- Coordinates: 31°33′06″S 147°12′12″E

Map
- Location in New South Wales

Runways
| Direction | Length | | Surface |
| Direction | m | ft | Surface |
|---|---|---|---|
| 05/23 | 1,643 | 5,390 | Asphalt |
| 18/36 | 1,062 | 3,484 | Grass |
- Sources: Australian AIP and aerodrome chart

Nyngan Airport (IATA: NYN, ICAO: YNYN) is a small airport in Nyngan, New South Wales, Australia.

== See also ==
- List of airports in New South Wales
