= Nioki =

- Commune
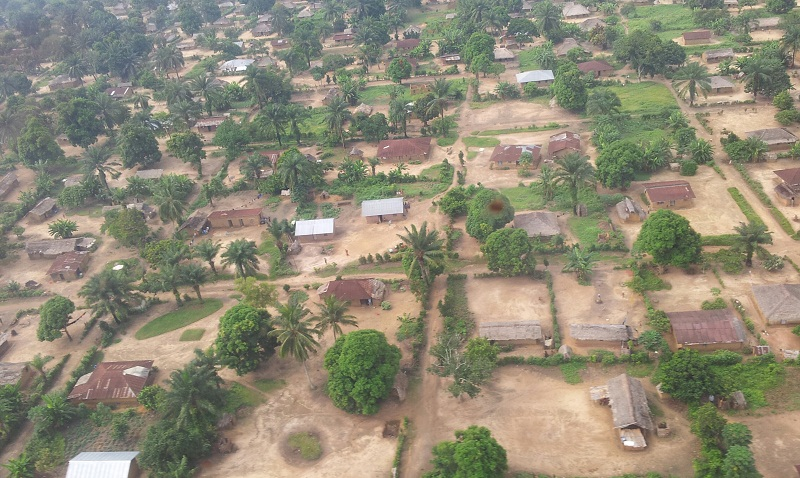
- Nioki

- Location in Democratic Republic of the Congo
- Coordinates: 2°42′59.7″S 17°40′59.9″E
- Country: DR Congo
- Province: Mai-Ndombe
- Territory: Kutu
- Time zone: UTC+1 (West Africa Time)

Nioki is a town and community in Mai-Ndombe province of the Democratic Republic of the Congo, on the Fimi River. It was founded as a colonial post by Alexandre Delcommune around 1887.
