= Nukutavake =

Atoll in French Polynesia

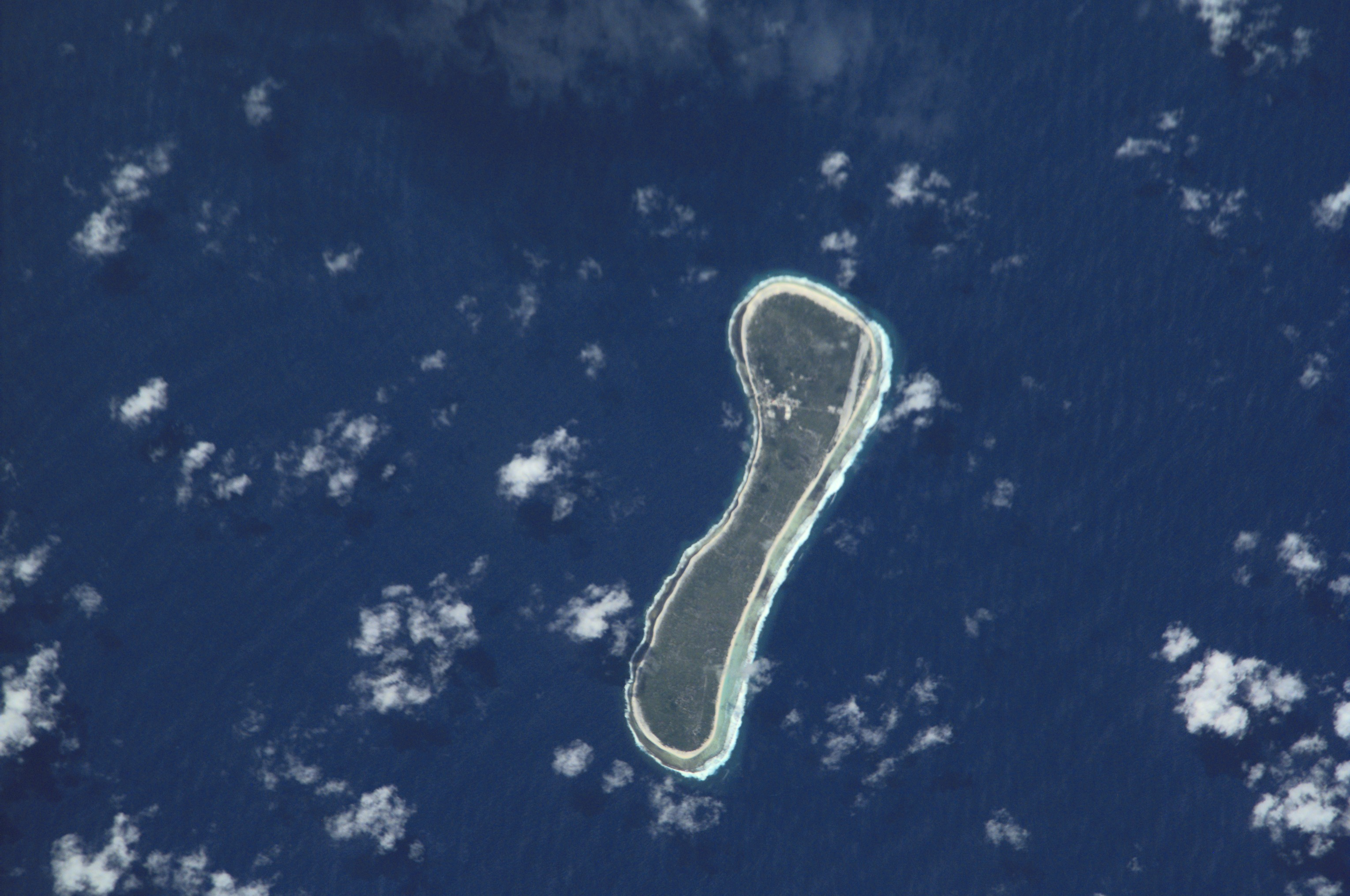
- NASA picture of Nukutavake

- Location within French Polynesia

Geography
- Location: Pacific Ocean
- Coordinates: 19°16′S 138°46′W
- Archipelago: Tuamotus
- Area: 5.5 km^{2} (2.1 sq mi)
- Length: 5 km (3.1 mi)
- Width: 1.3 km (0.81 mi)

Administration
- France
- Overseas collectivity: French Polynesia
- Administrative subdivision: Îles Tuamotu-Gambier
- Commune: Nukutavake
- Largest settlement: Tavananui

Demographics
- Population: 119 (2022)

Nukutavake
- Commune
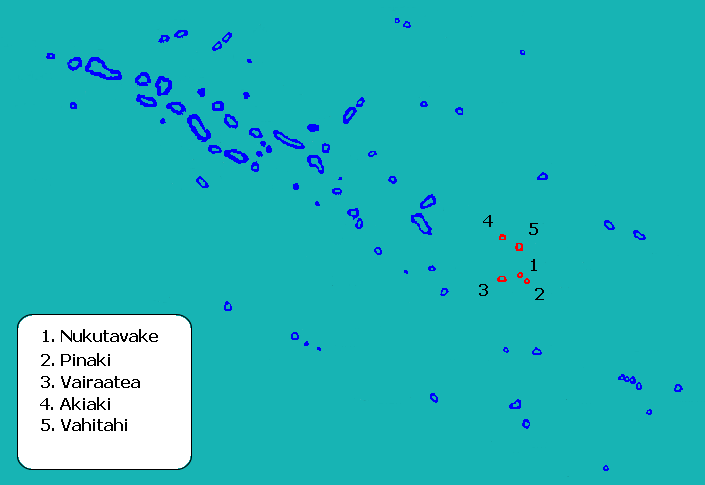
- Location of Nukutavake
- Coordinates: 19°17′11″S 138°47′49″W
- Country: France
- Overseas collectivity: French Polynesia
- Subdivision: Îles Tuamotu-Gambier
- Area^{1}: 13 km^{2} (5.0 sq mi)
- Elevation: 0 m (0 ft)
- Population (2022): 287
  - Density: 22/km^{2} (57/sq mi)
- Time zone: UTC−10:00
- INSEE/Postal code: 98732 /
- ^{1} French Land Register data, which excludes lakes, ponds, glaciers > 1 km^{2} (0.386 sq mi or 247 acres) and river estuaries.

Nukutavake or Nukutuvake is an island in the Tuamotu group in French Polynesia. It lies 1125 km from Tahiti. The closest land is small Pinaki Atoll, located 15 km to the southeast. Vairaatea Atoll lies 38 km to the west of Nukutavake.

Nukutavake's length is 5 km and its width between 0.45 km and 1.3 km. Nukutuvake is not a typical Tuamotu atoll, but a single island. It was formed when its lagoon filled up with silt, in a similar manner as Fuvahmulah in the Maldives, which has a similar size and shape. There are shallow remains of the lagoon filled with marshy vegetation. The higher ground has many coconut palms.

Nukutavake has 119 inhabitants (2022 census); Tavananui is the largest town. Many islanders have left the island in recent years, mainly to Tahiti, in search for work. There are a number of abandoned houses on the island. The people who remain live primarily on fish and copra production. There is a cyclone shelter on Nukutavake.

== History ==
The first recorded European to arrive at Nukutavake was Englishman Samuel Wallis in 1767. He named it "Queen Charlotte Island" (Reine Charlotte). Wallis observed that the island was inhabited and well-stocked with coconut trees, but Captain Frederick Beechey, who visited Nukutavake in 1826, found it with no population and without the trees.

== Administration ==
The commune of Nukutavake consists of the associated communes Nukutavake (which also includes the uninhabited island Pinaki), Vahitahi (which also includes the uninhabited island Akiaki) and Vairaatea. Geographically these islands are part of the East-central subgroup of the Tuamotus, which includes Ahunui, Amanu, Fangatau, Hao and Nukutavake.

| Island | Population (2022 census) | Area (km^{2}) | Area of lagoon (km^{2}) | Postcode |
|---|---|---|---|---|
| Nukutavake | 119 | 5.5 | 0 | 98773 |
| Vahitahi | 103 | 2.5 | 7.4 | 98788 |
| Vairaatea | 65 | 3 | 13 | 98791 |
| Pinaki | 0 | 1.3 | 0.7 | - |
| Akiaki | 0 | 1.2 | 0 | - |
| TOTAL | 287 | 13 | - | - |

== Transport ==
The island is served by the Nukutavake Airport (IATA: NUK, ICAO: NTGW).
