= Vahitahi =

Atoll in French Polynesia

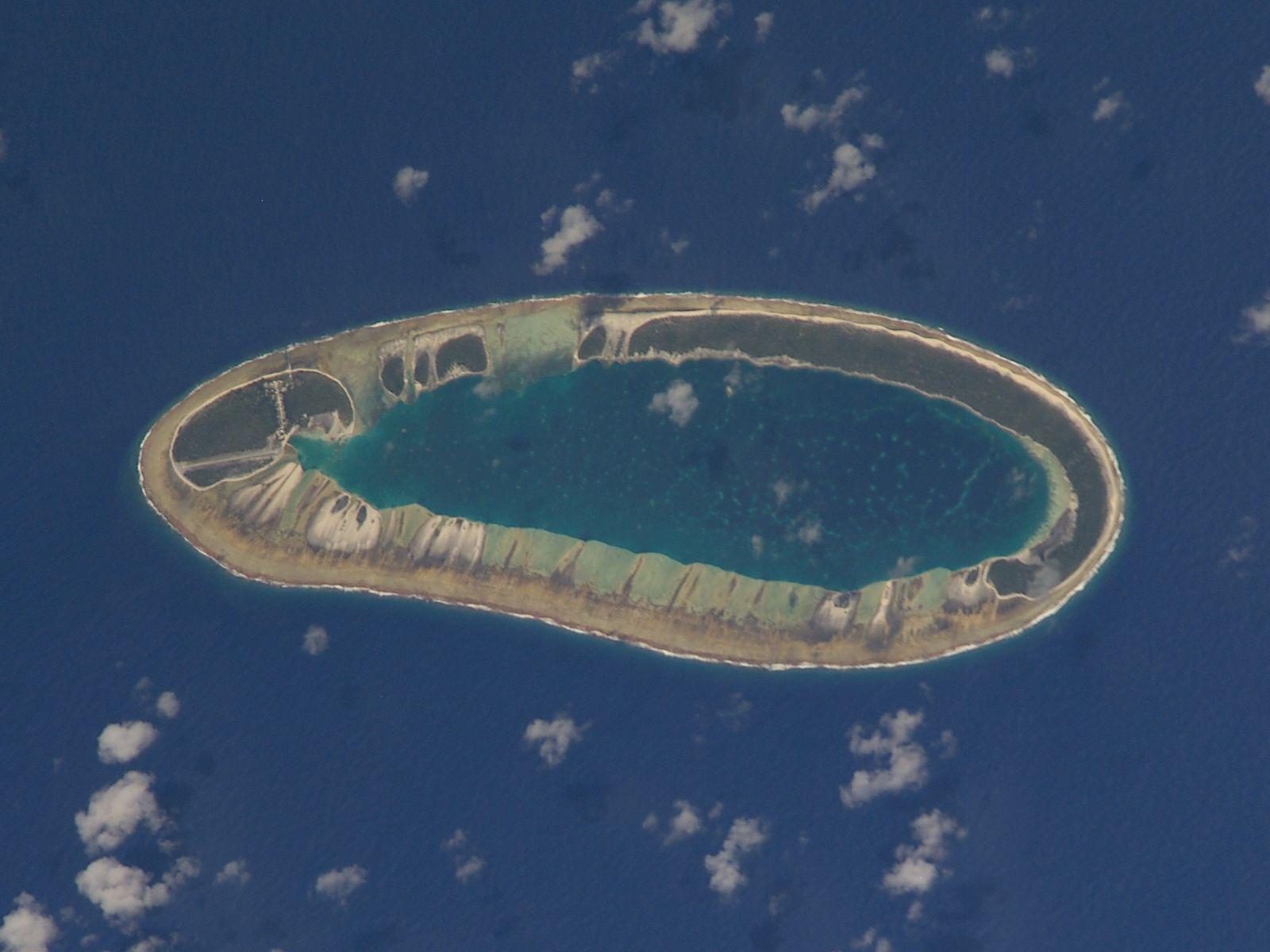
- NASA picture of Vahitahi Atoll

- Location within French Polynesia

Geography
- Location: Pacific Ocean
- Coordinates: 18°47′S 138°50′W
- Archipelago: Tuamotus
- Area: 13 km^{2} (5.0 sq mi) (lagoon); 2.5 km^{2} (1 sq mi) (above water)
- Length: 10 km (6 mi)
- Width: 4.5 km (2.8 mi)

Administration
- France
- Overseas collectivity: French Polynesia
- Administrative subdivision: Îles Tuamotu-Gambier
- Commune: Nukutavake

Demographics
- Population: 105 (2012)

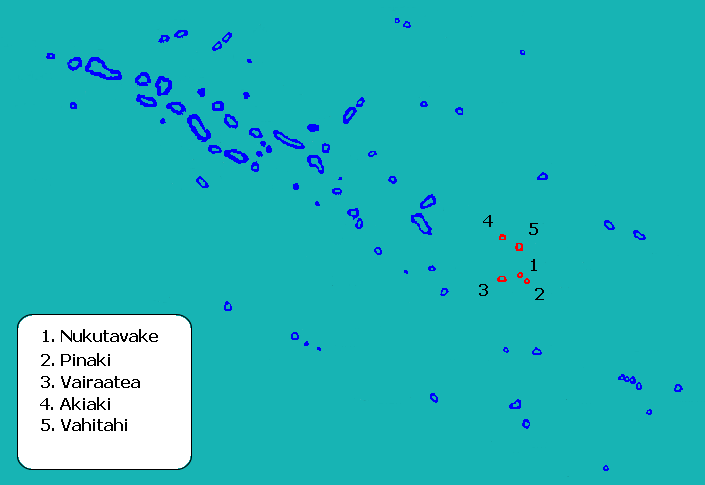
Location of Vahitahi within the Tuamotu archipelago

Vahitahi, or Vaitake, is an atoll in the eastern area of the Tuamotu Archipelago, French Polynesia. Vahitahi's nearest neighbour is Akiaki, which is located 41 kilometres (25 miles) to the northwest.

Vahitahi is a small atoll with an elongated oval shape. It measures approximately 41 kilometres (25 miles) in length and has a maximum width of 4.5 kilometres (2.8 miles). Its reef encloses completely the lagoon. The total land area of the islands on its reef is 2.5 square kilometres (1.0 square mile).

The main village is called Mohitu (formerly Temanufaara). There were 105 inhabitants according to the 2012 census. Vahitahi is the least populous atoll in French Polynesia to see a regular air service.

== History ==
Vahitahi Atoll was the first land that Louis Antoine de Bougainville found in the Pacific in 1768. He called the atoll Les Quatre Facardins, after a novel of the time. James Cook reached Vahitahi the following year and named it Lagoon Island.

Vahitahi has a territorial airport. It was inaugurated in 1986.

== Administration ==
Administratively Vahitahi Atoll belongs to the commune of Nukutavake.
