= Nkolo-Fuma Airport =

Nkolo Fuma Airport
- IATA: NKL; ICAO: FZAR

Summary
- Airport type: Public
- Serves: Kolo Fuma
- Elevation AMSL: 1,476 ft / 450 m
- Coordinates: 5°25′15″S 14°49′00″E

Map
- Location of the airport in Democratic Republic of the Congo

Runways
Direction	Length		Surface
Direction	m	ft	Surface
07/25	1,130	3,707	Grass
- Sources: GCM Google Maps

Nkolo Fuma Airport (IATA: NKL, ICAO: FZAR) is an airport serving the village of Kolo Fuma in Kongo Central Province, Democratic Republic of the Congo.

== See also ==
- Transport in the Democratic Republic of the Congo
- List of airports in the Democratic Republic of the Congo
