= Kolo Fuma =

- Location in Democratic Republic of the Congo
- Coordinates: 5°25′28″S 14°48′56″E
- Country: Democratic Republic of the Congo
- Province: Bas-Congo

Kolo Fuma is a community in Bas-Congo Province, Democratic Republic of the Congo. It is served by Nkolo-Fuma Airport.
