= Vairaatea =

Atoll in French Polynesia

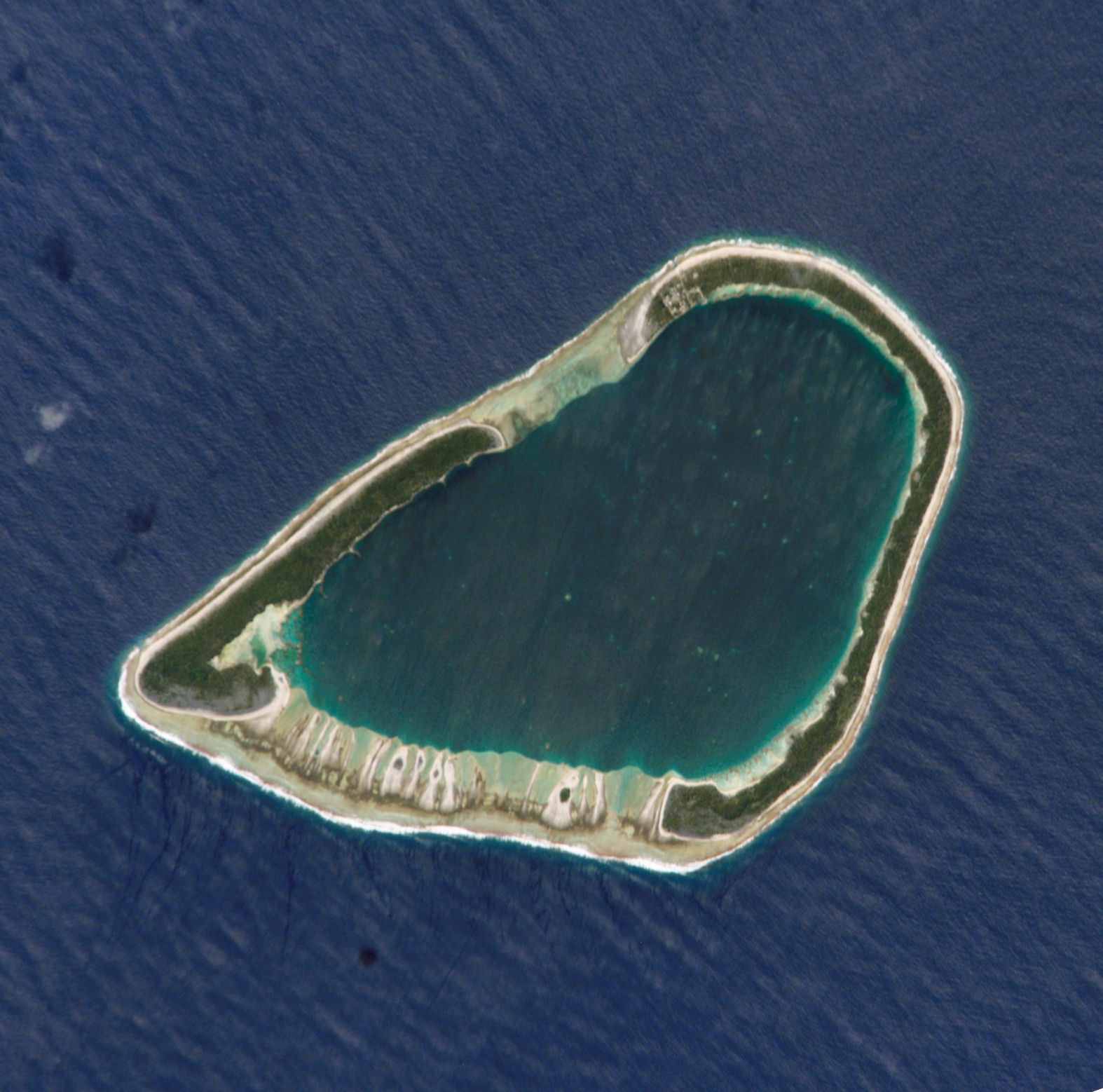
- NASA picture of Vairaatea Atoll

- Location within French Polynesia

Geography
- Location: Pacific Ocean
- Coordinates: 19°21′S 139°13′W
- Archipelago: Tuamotus
- Area: 13 km^{2} (5.0 sq mi) (lagoon); 3 km^{2} (1 sq mi) (above water)
- Length: 8 km (5 mi)
- Width: 4 km (2.5 mi)

Administration
- France
- Overseas collectivity: French Polynesia
- Administrative subdivision: Îles Tuamotu-Gambier
- Commune: Nukutavake

Demographics
- Population: 57 (2012)

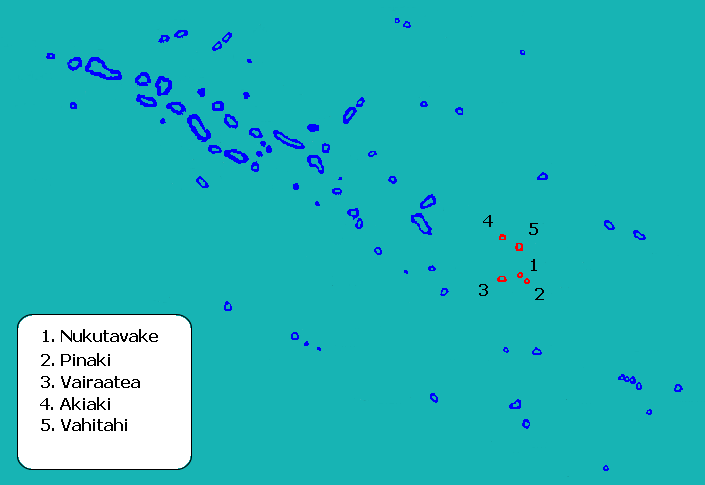
Location of Vairaatea within the Tuamotu archipelago

Vairaatea is a small atoll of the Tuamotu group in French Polynesia. Geographically Vairaatea Atoll is part of the East-central subgroup of the Tuamotus, which includes Ahunui, Amanu, Fangatau, Hao and Nukutavake. Nukutavake, the closest land, lies 41 kilometres (25 miles) to the east.

Vairaatea Atoll measures 8 kilometres (5 miles) in length and its width is about 4 kilometres (2 miles). Its reef has a roughly triangular shape. There are two long islands on it. The reef completely encloses a 13-square-kilometre (5-square-mile) lagoon. Landing on this atoll is difficult on account of the surf and the lack of a safe anchorage.

In 1989, Vairaatea was inhabited by eight families living in a village at the northern end of Puka Runga, the only inhabited island. According to the 2012 census, 57 people were living in Vairaatea, a drop from 70 in 1996.

== History ==
The first recorded European to arrive at Vairaatea was the Spanish explorer Pedro Fernández de Quirós on the 9 February 1606. He named this atoll San Miguel Arcángel. However his captains Prado y Tovar and Vaéz de Torres refer to it as Santa Polonia as it was sighted on the day of this Christian martyr.

Englishman Samuel Wallis visited Vairaatea in 1767. He named it "Lord Egmont". In some maps, it also appears as "Industriel".

== Administration ==
Administratively Vairaatea is part of the commune of Nukutavake.
