= Mount Drysdale, New South Wales =

Ghost town in New South Wales, Australia

Coordinates: 31°10′11.7″S 145°52′19.4″E

Mount Drysdale is a ghost town in the Orana region of New South Wales, Australia. It was once a village associated with gold mining. It lies within the locality of Tindarey, named after the original pastoral holding from which the village site was excised.

== Location ==
The site of the former village lies within the County of Robinson, Parish of Moquilamba. It lay approximately 4 km west of Kidman Way, north of Cobar. The nearest settlement is Cobar, approximately 40 km distant by road. The site lies west of Yanda Creek, an ephemeral tributary of the Darling River.

== History ==
=== Aboriginal and early settler history ===
The area that would become Mount Drysdale lies on the traditional lands of Wangaaypuwan dialect speakers (also known as Wangaibon) of Ngiyampaa people, referred to in their own language as Ngiyampaa Wangaaypuwan. There is significant evidence of Aboriginal occupation at Mount Drysdale and it has been declared as an Aboriginal place. It lies 40 km east-north-east of the Mount Grenfell rock art site, an important Ngiyampaa Wangaaypuwan Aboriginal place.

Settlers took over the area now known as Mount Drysdale, as part of the 'Tindarey' (or 'Tindeyrey') pastoral leasehold that was notified in July 1885. It was, at best, marginal country for sheep grazing, even more so after the spread of feral rabbits to the area.

Settler records show that there were Aboriginal people still living on the 'Tindarey' sheep station in late 1885. It seems that there was frontier violence—probably including a massacre of local people by settlers in the Mount Drysdale area—either during the 1880s or in 1899, the earlier period seems more likely. Whatever it was that occurred is not well documented. However, by 1907, official records showed no Aboriginal people as living at Mount Drysdale.

=== Mining village ===
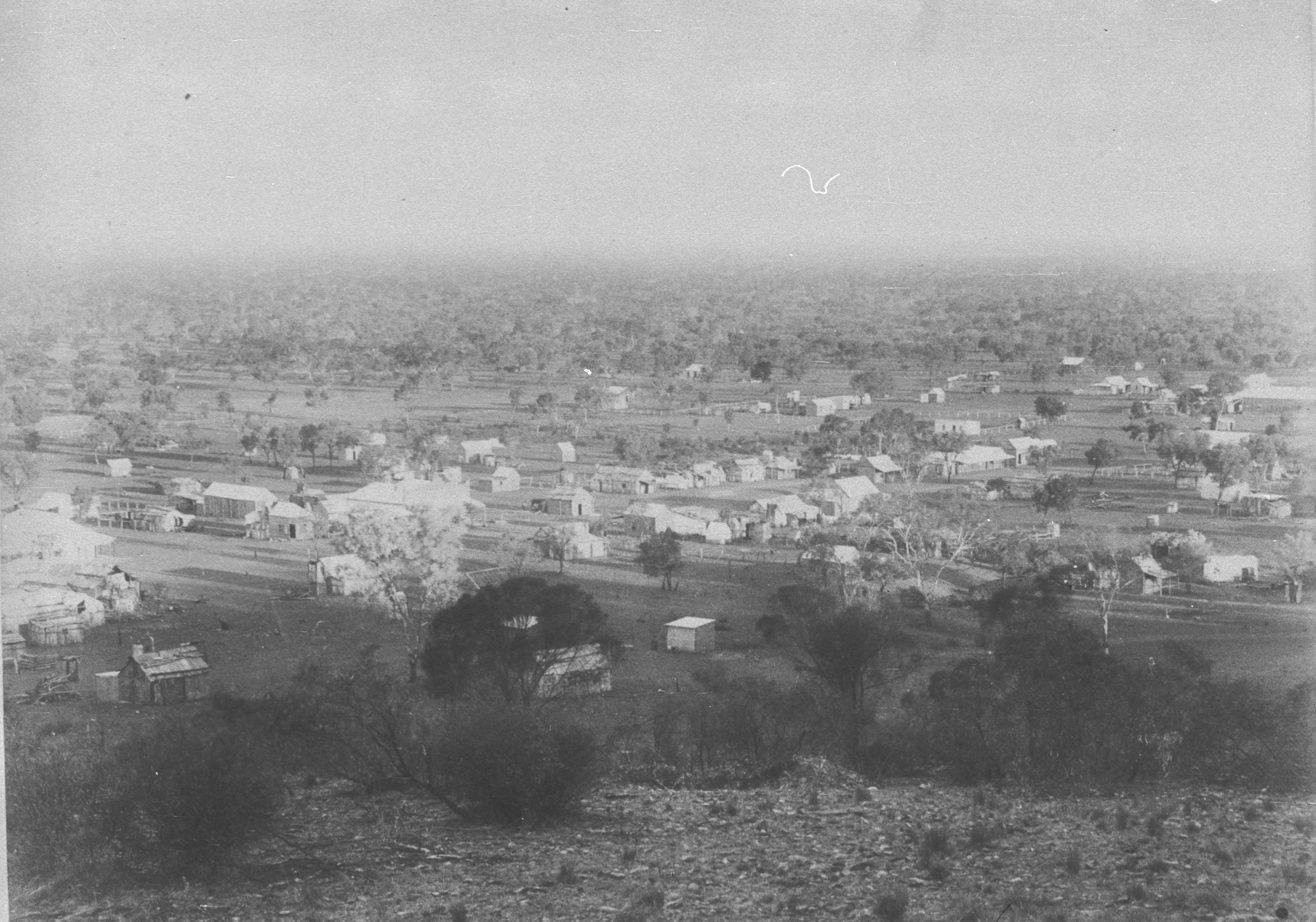
View of the mining village of Mount Drysdale, c.1895. (Collection of Mitchell Library, State Library of NSW). This view is looking east from the landform known as Mount Drysdale.

In 1887, gold had been found at Mount Billagoe. In 1892, payable alluvial gold was found on the western side of a hill at the northern end of the same range of hills. That caused a rush to the field and prospectors soon started to search for a reef. In October 1892, David Drysdale found the gold reef on that hill and it was named, Mount Drysdale, after him. In August 1893, there were 120 men working on the field.

The site for a village—on the eastern side of the base of Mount Drysdale, downhill from the Mount Drysdale claim—was selected in August 1893 and the village of Mount Dysdale was proclaimed on 18 October 1893.

In late 1894, there were around 400 miners working on the field and land was reserved for the village's public buildings. By mid-1895, the village had three hotels, a large store, a post office and a school with 90 pupils. Around May 1901, the village's population was around 223.

Although there were many claims and mines on the field, two mines would come to dominate the field, the Mount Drysdale mine and the Eldorado mine. These two mines were adjacent and, in time, would come be operated conjointly. The Mount Drysdale mine was operated by a listed mining company, the Mount Drysdale Gold Mining Company Limited. The lode was a rich one and the goldfield was prosperous for many years.

In 1910, the Mt Drysdale mine had reached a depth of over 500 feet, and had also struck water. Later in the same year, the main shaft of the mine reached 572 feet, reportedly making it the deepest gold mine in the Cobar mining region at the time. Once the shaft had been timbered, it was planned to remove ore from areas that previously could not be mined profitably, above the 460 foot level, and make new drives to the north and south, at the 560 foot level. The work on the shaft had been expensive, but the company's directors were optimistic, and raised more capital. Work on the new drives was well underway by early 1911. The two companies were working to amalgamate their interests, into a single company, in 1911.

By mid 1912, both the Mt Drysdale and Eldorado companies were in financial difficulty. Mining was suspended, probably as early as mid 1911, and, in March 1913, it was resolved to wind up the Mt Drysdale company. In 1916, a syndicate was formed to dewater the Mt Drysdale mine and restart operations, Work reportedly did commenced, in mid 1916, and dewatering was underway in August 1916. The efforts seem to have failed, because the mine's surface equipment was sold to the CSA mine, in mid 1917, and the syndicate was wound up in May 1918. The machinery and buildings at the Eldorado mine were up for sale in August 1918. The buildings from the Eldorado went to the C.S.A. mine at Elouera and the machinery to the Gladstone Mine at Wrightville. Subsequent attempts to reopen the two mines by others seem to have failed too. After the deep shaft had been sunk, it seems that the miners had 'lost the lode'.

Mining and exploration continued on a smaller scale, during the 1920s and 1930s but the heyday of the gold field had been over, once the two dominant mines closed. The police station closed in October 1914. The school closed in 1913 and its building was relocated to another mining settlement, Elouera, in 1919. The Mount Drysdale hotel closed in 1917, and its licence was transferred to the new Royal Hotel at Elouera.

There was a smaller, neighbouring village known as Drysdale West—proclaimed in November 1894—but it seems to have not lasted long and its design was cancelled in 1922. There was a market garden, run by ethnic-Chinese, near West Drysdale.

The village could still raise a cricket team in the late 1920s. By 1932, all that was left of the village was a store, a post office, a hall and about four houses "distantly situated". In late 1934, voting took place at a private residence, suggesting that the post office had closed by then. The old school site was resumed in 1946, and the reserves of land for public buildings were revoked in 1951. There were only seven voters there at the 1950 election. In 1962, it ceased to be a polling place. The old village faded away. Its last residents were known as 'Dot and Joe', whose deserted cottage was still standing in 2006.

Cobar Shire advertised for sale 20 allotments in the old village, to recover rates that had not been paid by their long-absent or deceased owners, in 2006. At least notionally, the village of Mount Drysdale still exists.

== Remnants ==
McKell Street still appears on maps, now at the locality of Tindarey, as do many allotments of the former Mount Drysdale village. Other now lost streets of the former village included Kelly, Cotton, Waddlell, Gould, Macpherson, Cobar and Carter streets. The village has a cemetery. The 'Mine Tank', an in-ground water storage once used by the mines, still exists, as do remnants of the market garden; all lie to the north of the village on the far side of the hill close to the site of West Drysdale. There is a surviving government caretaker's cottage. Otherwise, apart from its worked out mines, rusting equipment and some ruins, there is nothing left of Mount Drysdale.

In February 2022, Mount Drysdale was added to the N.S.W. Heritage Register as the Billagoe (Mount Drysdale) Cultural Landscape, noted for both its Aboriginal and settler heritage significance.
