= Kandos, New South Wales =

Kandos
- Town
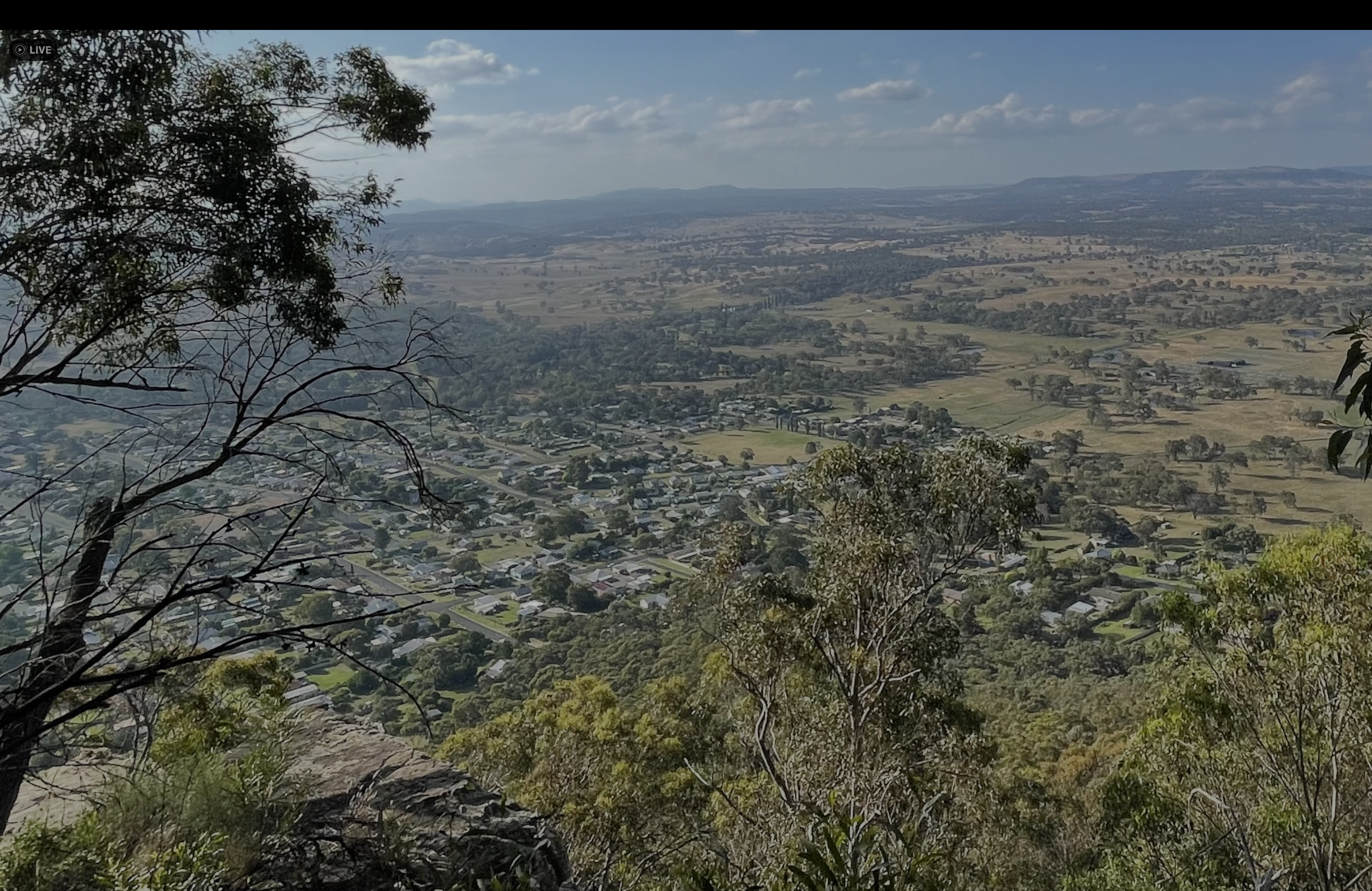
- Kandos from the perspective of a nearby mountain.

- Coordinates: 32°51′33″S 149°58′25″E
- Country: Australia
- State: New South Wales
- LGA: Mid-Western Regional Council
- Location: 235 km (146 mi) NW of Sydney; 93 km (58 mi) NE of Bathurst; 91 km (57 mi) N of Lithgow; 61 km (38 mi) SE of Mudgee; 7 km (4.3 mi) S of Rylstone

Government
  - State electorate: Bathurst
  - Federal division: Calare
- Elevation: 650 m (2,130 ft)

Population
  - Total: 1,263 (2021 census)
- Postcode: 2848

Kandos is a rural town located within the Mid-Western Region in New South Wales, Australia. The area is the traditional home of the Dabee tribe of the Wiradjuri people. Kandos and neighboring town Rylstone (located 7 kilometres away) have a shared community that is connected through farming, events, the arts and Aboriginal culture. Kandos is within an hours drive of Mudgee, and within two of Lithgow and Bathurst. It is a three hour drive from Sydney (via the Blue Mountains and Castlereagh Highway); and Newcastle (via Bylong Valley Way). In the 2021 census, Kandos had a population of 1263.

== Local events ==
=== Cementa ===
Cementa is a biennial 4-day International Contemporary Arts Festival which brings together more than 60 urban and regional artists who exhibit video, installation, sound, performance and 2D and 3D artworks in venues and locations across the town and its surrounds. The festival began in 2013, and returned in 2015, 2017, 2019, 2022 and 2024. The next festival is currently set to take place in September 2026. Cementa has continually grown and has been covered by outlets including the Australian Broadcasting Corporation on their Back Roads television program.

=== Kandos Street Machine and Hot Rod Show ===
Street Machine is held annually on a weekend on or near Australia Day. Their stated aim is 'to put on one of the most laid back and family friendly car shows around'. Many have criticised Street Machine for polluting the town for days following the event, though others have praised it for bringing people together.

=== CWA Kandos Gardens Fair ===
CWA Kandos Gardens Fair is a biennial weekend open gardens event, which showcases up to 12 town and country gardens in Kandos Rylstone and surrounds. Entertainment, demonstrations, talks, stalls and food are scattered throughout the gardens.

=== The Rylstone Kandos Show ===
The Rylstone Kandos Show is held annually in February at the Rylstone Showground. The show hosts many rides, food trucks and vans with toys to purchase. There are arts and crafts made by the schoolchildren on display, as well as a section for showcasing animals. Each show ends with a fireworks display.

=== Streetfeast ===
Streetfeast is an annual lunch held on the main street of Rylstone in early November. Stalls, shops and eateries also feature local produce, wines, art and craft.

== Amenities ==
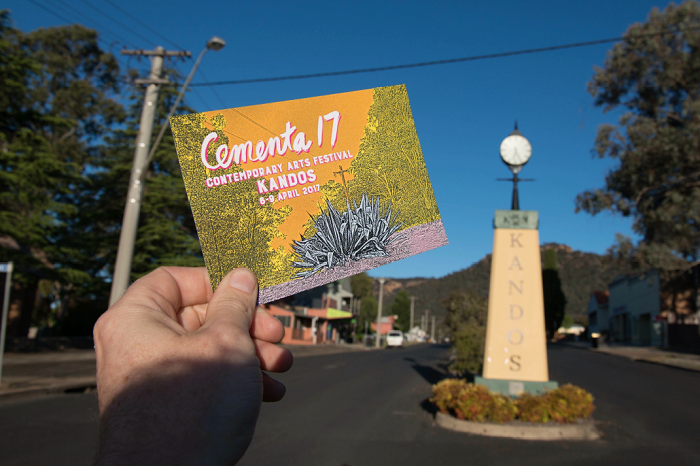

=== Ganguddy ===
Ganguddy, (also known as Dunns Swamp) is a popular recreation area and lake in the Wollemi National Park. Ganguddy was established when Cement Australia constructed a weir on the Cudgegong River to provide piped water to Kandos' cement factory. Current facilities include bushwalking tracks, picnic areas, camping sites, Aboriginal art, fishing and kayaking services run by locals throughout the summer. Many also recreationally jump off of the rocks that surround Ganguddy. Ganguddy is popular with both locals and tourists from around Australia, with up to 40,000 visitors per year.

=== Kandos Museum ===
The Kandos Museum, formerly the Methodist Church, is built in Spanish Mission style and is listed on the Australian Heritage Database. There is an outdoor display of large industrial items that were formerly in the cement factory. The museum contains a sizeable group of objects, photographs and information about the industrial, social and war history of the area. There is an electric vehicle charging facility at this location. Kandos Museum is the tourist information outlet.

=== Coomber Park ===
Angus Avenue and Rotary Park on Ilford Road have playgrounds, picnic areas and toilets. Smaller parks in the town are on Darton Park and a park on the corner of Noyes and Fleming Streets. The parks have become points of interests for youth.

=== Kandos and District Memorial Olympic Swimming Pool ===
Kandos and District Memorial Olympic Swimming Pool is a government owned block of lands hosting two swimming pools - a 50 metre Olympic Swimming Pool as well as a covered children's paddling pool. There are modern amenities, bathrooms, a canteen, and a mini basketball court. There is a skate park located beside the swimming pool. The local schools use the swimming pool during the summer.

=== Henbury Golf Course ===
Henbury Golf Course is an 18-hole championship golf course designed in the 1930s by two eminent golf architects. There are tennis courts and a putting green

=== Kandos Rylstone Community Radio ===
Kandos Rylstone Community Radio or KRR-FM 98.7 is a local radio station run by the community. It is a member of the Community Broadcasting Association of Australia and broadcasts programs hosted by locals. KRR-FM also informs listeners of local and national news and events.

== Train, coach and other transport ==
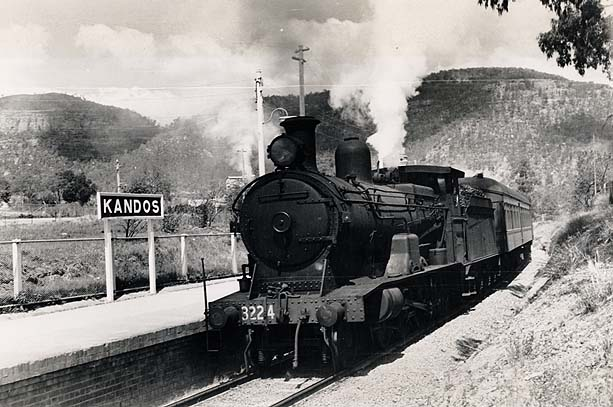
Train at Kandos railway station

Kandos is on the Wallerawang to Gwabegar railway line. The section of the line from Capertee to Rylstone was completed in 1884 and Kandos station was opened in 1915. Scheduled passenger services ceased in 1985 and were replaced by daily road coach services to Lithgow and Gulgong. On 24 October 2017, the NSW Government announced a $1.1 million grant to reinstate the 8km rail link between Kandos and Rylstone, and today has occasional tourist trains run through it.

== Education ==
Kandos has one high school and one primary school, both of which are located on Dangar Street. A preschool is located across the road. The schools have shared utilities such as an agriculture plot, a gymnasium, and a cafeteria. Kandos High School has all mandatory courses as well as special interest courses for food education, music, agriculture, communications, ancient history, and woodwork. The school also runs distance education for classes that don't run in person.

== Health facilities ==
Two doctor practices service the two towns, being Kandos Family Medical Practice and Kandos Advanced Medical Centre. Neighbouring town Rylstone also has Rylstone Health One.

== History ==
=== Company town ===
The NSW Cement Lime and Coal Company was registered in May 1913, and floated in August that year to build a cement industry. The company purchased 100 acres from local farmer John Lloyd Junior for £2000 on which to establish an industry and town. The industrial infrastructure was built during the first three years. Limestone was lifted from a nearby quarry and transported via an aerial ropeway. Coal and shale were mined nearby. Dams, railway sidings, a railway station, stacks, silos, and a powerhouse were built, kilns imported and machinery installed. Cement production began in August 1916. It took longer than anticipated to establish the industry because the first plant, supplied by Krupp Ltd Germany, was interned at Portuguese West Africa at the outbreak of the First World War, thus requiring General Manager Frank Oakden to sail to America and England to order another plant. Kandos was originally named Candos - an acronym, it is believed, of letters taken from the Lime and Cement Company directors' names. In 1915 the Post Master General deemed that the name Candos was too similar to Chandos in South Australia, and the name was changed to Kandos.

James Dawson, local surveyor and landowner, was contracted by the cement company to survey the first town subdivision and most subdivisions thereafter. At the first land sale at Kandos on 14 August 1915, 200 business and residential sites were auctioned. Local pastoralist Hunter White of Havilah paid an exceptionally high price of £2700 for land set aside for a hotel on the corner of Angus Avenue and White Crescent. The land attracted that price because the company put a caveat on all land titles, to prevent the building of another hotel. White, a large investor in the company and soon to be a company director, later onsold to Tooth & Co. Over ten years, various attempts were made to obtain another hotel licence on non-company land. Each time it was opposed in the licensing courts. In 1926 a licence for a second hotel was finally granted to William Morgan, for the Railway Hotel. It was built on Ilford Road on a crown subdivision, which was unaffected by the cement company's caveat. The streets in the first subdivision were also named after company officials: Angus Avenue (James Angus, chairman) Buchanan Street (Edward Buchanan master builder); White Crescent (Hunter White local pastoralist); Rodgers Street (Colin Rodgers financier); Jaques Street (Charles Jaques solicitor); McDonald Street (George McDonald politician); Noyes Street (Edward Noyes engineering consultant); Davies Road (Lewis Davis shipping merchant). All were successful city capitalists.

For a time, it seemed that Kandos would have a second major industry. The copper mining company C.S.A. Limited spent £32,000 on an electrolytic copper refinery at Kandos, which reused electrolytic tanks from the closed Great Cobar copper refinery at Lithgow. The smelting section of the new plant at Kandos entered production, around September 1919, but the electrolytic refinery never entered service. The CSA Mine at Elouera closed due to an underground fire. The plant and buildings at Kandos were sold off in 1925. The timber from its large building was reused at the nearby cement plant, but its concrete chimney stack would remain standing until the 1980s.

=== 20th-century town ===
Kandos is a rare 20th-century town, having been established in the nineteen hundreds - unlike the majority of towns in New South Wales. It began as a private village but was proclaimed an urban area on 11 January 1918 and came under the control of Rylstone Shire Council. All buildings in the town of Kandos, except for the original public school behind the Police Station, were built after 1915. There are several buildings of architectural interest. Kandos Museum, formerly the Methodist Church, was designed by works manager, Floyd S Richards, in the Californian Mission Style of his hometown church in America. It is on the Australian Heritage Database. St Dominic's Convent was built in the Spanish Mission Style for the Good Samaritan nuns. Both are in contrast to the modernist functional Kandos Community Centre, while the Band Rotunda, built entirely of cement, is a temple-like structure in the classical revival style. It is believed Kandos was the first place in Australia to have concrete electricity poles, when early in 1920 the cement works supplied electricity to light Angus Avenue, Kandos Hotel, Angus Memorial Hall, businesses in the main street, the railway station and station master's cottage.

=== Kandos helped build NSW ===
Kandos brands itself as "the town that made the cement that made your town". Kandos cement was used in roads, bridges, reservoirs, stacks, tanks, pipes, posts, paths, fences and buildings. It was used for roof tiles, asbestos sheets and ash bricks. Kandos also supplied the cement for construction of Sydney Harbour Bridge as well as other city infrastructure, including the City Circle railway between Central and St James, Lane Cove Road, Glebe Island Wheat Silos, the Royal Automobile Club, Mark Foy's additions, as well as the Sydney Opera House.

=== Migrants helped build Kandos ===
Many migrants contributed to the growth of Kandos. The first chairman (James Angus), managing director (Frank Oakden), works manager (Floyd Richards), chief engineer (Vilhelm Langevad) and architect (Stanley Jeffreys) were all migrants. In the 1920s migrants opened businesses and worked for the company. It is estimated that around 400 newly arrived migrants, mainly refugees, were living in and around Kandos in the 1950s and 1960s, coming mainly from Eastern Europe including Poland, Italy, Slovenia, Greece, Ukraine, Estonia, Hungary and Lithuania. Today, migrants from the Middle East and Asia make an important contribution. The clock in the main street was donated by a group of migrants, who were naturalised in 1958.

== Cement Factory ==
The Kandos Cement Works, which is what the town itself was built to facilitate, was closed by Cement Australia in September 2011 due to the factory becoming outdated by modern standards in cement production. After its closure, the cement factory was partially used as a storage facility in its office area, and the cement production area went abandoned. The Cement Works was sold by Cabmon Property in 2025 with the intention of being re-purposed to make bio-methanol.
