= Cobar =

- Town
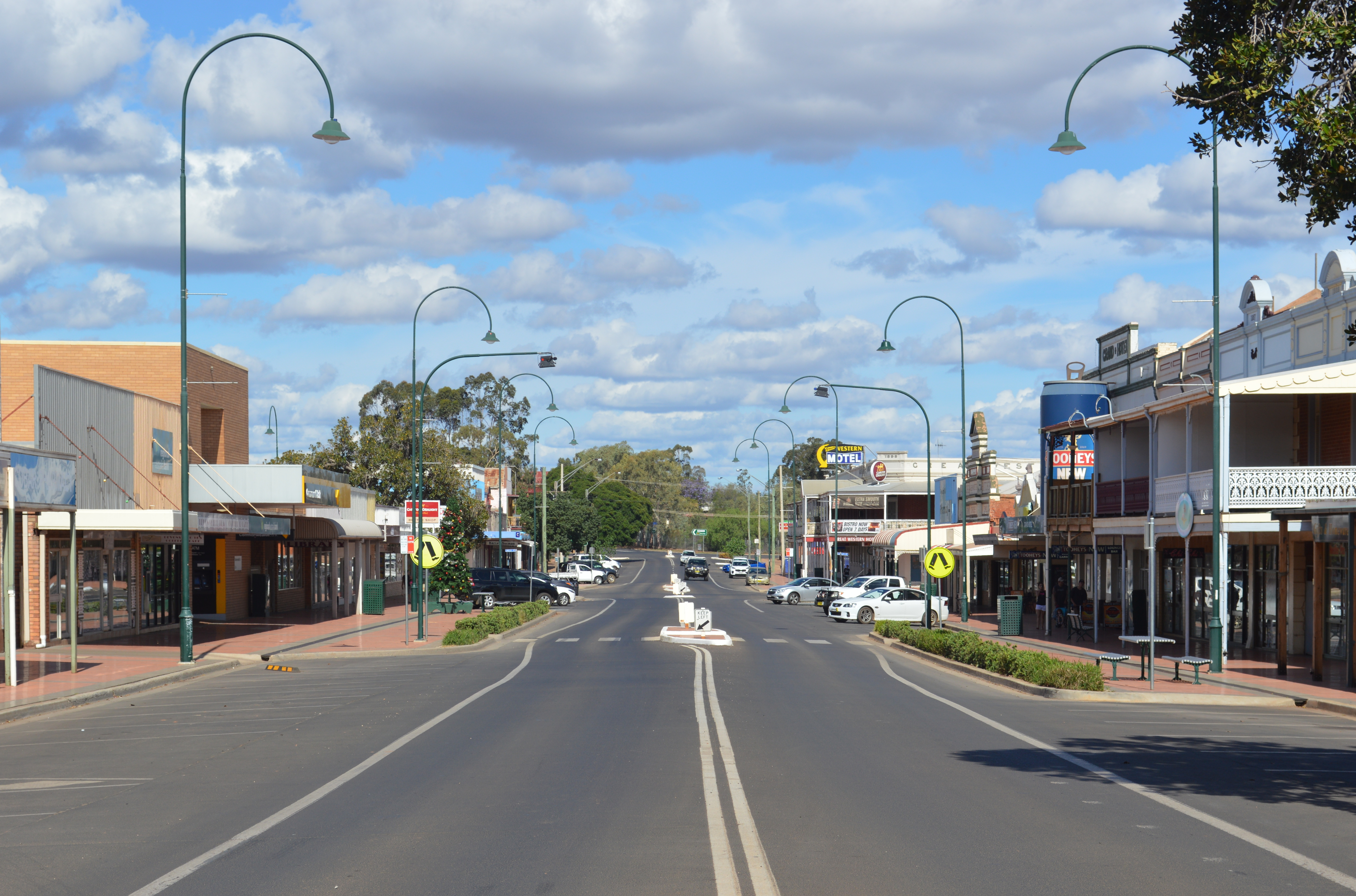
- Marshall Street, the main street of Cobar. Cobar retains much of its late 19th-century architecture.

- Coordinates: 31°29′59″S 145°49′55″E
- Country: Australia
- State: New South Wales
- LGA: Cobar Shire
- Location: 711 km (442 mi) WNW of Sydney; 457 km (284 mi) E of Broken Hill; 160 km (99 mi) S of Bourke; 260 km (160 mi) E of Wilcannia; 133 km (83 mi) W of Nyngan
- Established: 1870

Government
  - State electorate: Barwon
  - Federal division: Parkes
- Elevation: 260 m (850 ft)

Population
  - Total: 3,369 (2021 census)
- Postcode: 2835
- County: Robinson
- Mean max temp: 26.0 °C (78.8 °F)
- Mean min temp: 11.8 °C (53.2 °F)
- Annual rainfall: 350.4 mm (13.80 in)

Cobar is a town in Outback New South Wales, Australia, whose economy is based mainly upon base metals and gold mining. The town is 712 km (442 mi) by road northwest of the state capital, Sydney. It is at the crossroads of the Kidman Way and Barrier Highway. The town and the local government area, the Cobar Shire, are on the eastern edge of the Outback. At the 2021 census, the town of Cobar had a population of 3,369. The Shire has a population of approximately 4,700 and an area of 44,065 square kilometres (17,014 sq mi).

Many sights of cultural interest can be found in and around Cobar. The town retains much of its colonial 19th-century architecture. The Towsers Huts, 3 km south of town but currently inaccessible to the public, are ruins of very simple colonial dwellings from around 1870. The ancient Aboriginal rock paintings at Mount Grenfell are some of the largest and most important in Australia. The Cobar Sound Chapel opened in April 2022.

== History ==
=== Indigenous origins ===
The Cobar area is part of the traditional territory of the Wongaibon people (within the Ngiyampaa language group associated with the arid plains and rocky hill country of the Central West area of NSW bordered by the Lachlan, Darling-Barwon and Bogan rivers). The name ‘Cobar’ is derived from a Ngiyampaa word – variously transcribed as kubbur, kuparr, gubarr or cuburra – for a water-hole and quarry where pigments of ochre, kaolin and blue and green copper minerals were mined for ceremonial use. Other sources claim the Aboriginal word means ‘red earth’ or ‘burnt earth’ (the ochre used for ceremonial body paint).

The Mount Grenfell Historic Site located north-west of Cobar is an important traditional meeting place with ceremonial significance. Extensive rock art at the site contains ochre and kaolin paintings of human and animal figures as well as hand stencils.

=== Pastoralism ===
To the pastoralists who had taken up runs along the Darling River during the 1850s the Cobar area was a waterless region between rivers. As pastoral stations became more established, tanks and wells were constructed to allow stock to be grazed in areas away from permanent watercourses (known as ‘back stations). By the mid-1860s back stations such as ‘Booroomugga’ and ‘Buckwaroon’ had been established in the Cobar locality (within the Warrego Pastoral District).

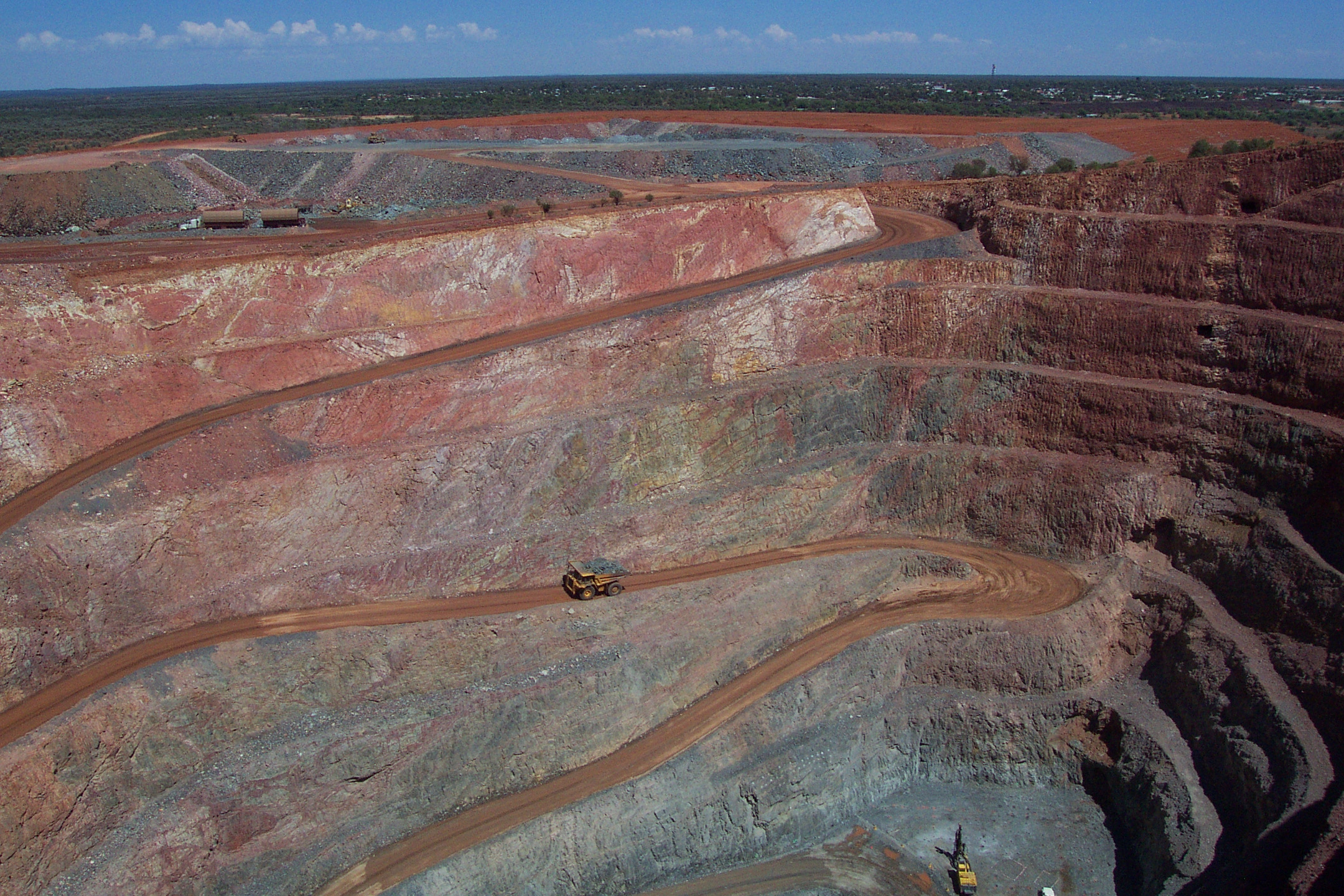
New Cobar Open Cut Mine

=== Copper ore ===
In September 1870 three contract well-sinkers, Charles Campbell, Thomas Hartman and George Gibb, were traveling south from Bourke to the Lachlan River. They had engaged two Aboriginal men, Frank and Boney, to guide them via the permanent watering places in the dry country between the rivers. Along the way they camped beside the Kubbur waterhole. The men noted the green and blue staining at the waterhole and collected some rock samples. On their journey further south the well-sinkers stopped at a shanty operated by Henry Kruge (near to the future site of Gilgunnia). Kruge’s wife, Sidwell, was from Cornwall and her family had emigrated to South Australia in the late-1840s and mined copper ore at Burra. She was able to identify the rock as containing copper. Sidwell Kruge's assessment was confirmed when her husband smelted some of the ore samples in his blacksmith's forge. The three men then returned to Bourke, intending to secure the ground around the Kubbur waterhole.

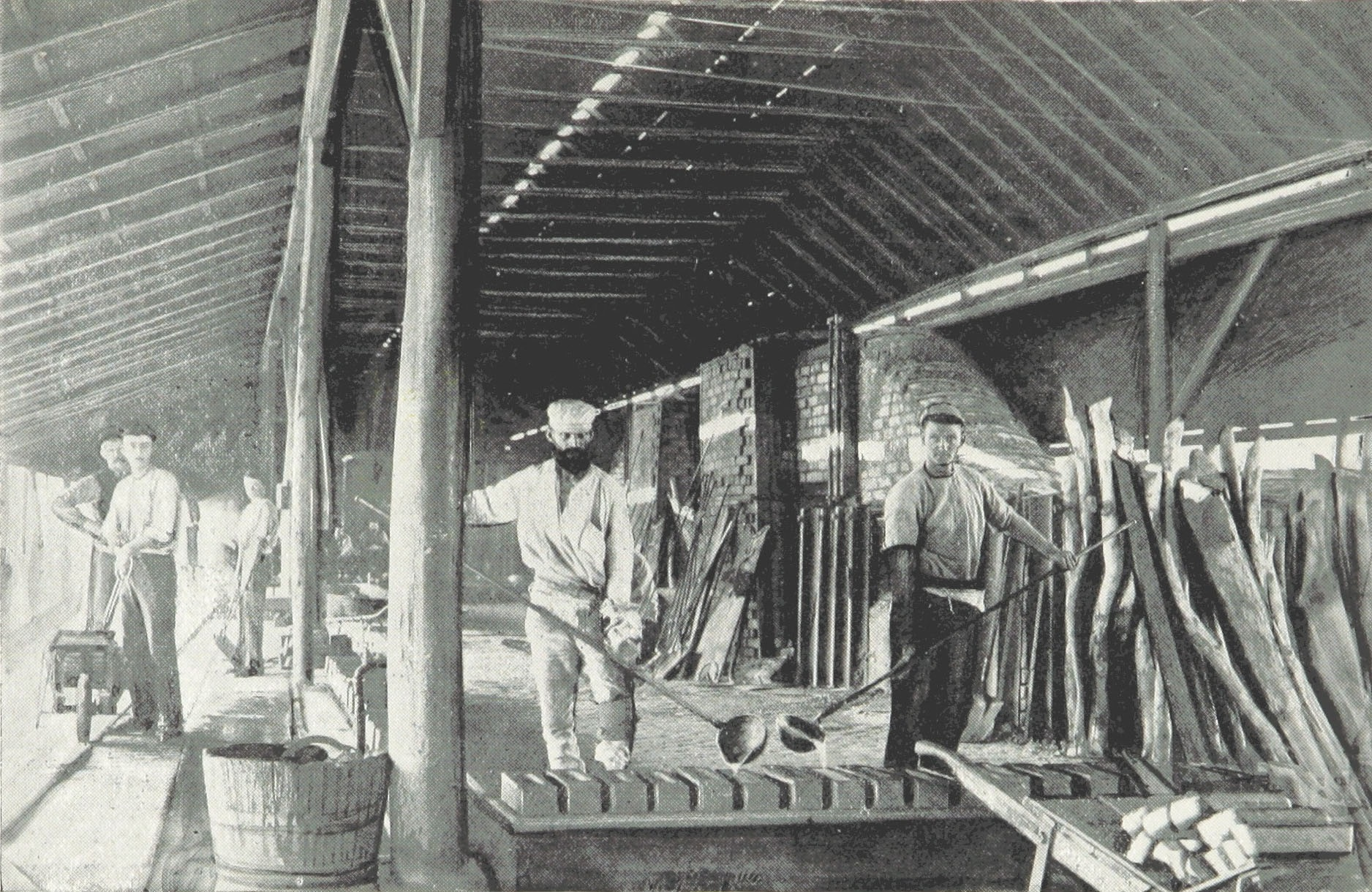
Great Cobar Copper Mining Syndicate's Refinery, Lithgow

In partnership with Bourke businessman Joseph Becker, Campbell, Hartman and Gibb took up a mineral conditional purchase of 40 acres at the locality. Shortly afterwards the Cobar Copper Mining Company was formed, and the lease of the mine was transferred to the company. In May 1871 it was reported that there had been "a call for tenders for drawing in copper ore from Cobar". In July 1871 a meeting was held in Bourke "of gentlemen interested in the Cobar copper mine" and shares were "eagerly bought at £15 per share". By the following November it was reported that "the affairs of the Cobar Copper Mine Company are in a flourishing condition, shares having rushed up from £15 to £70 and £80 per share".

In December 1871 a correspondent visited "the new Cobar copper mine" in company with Captain Lean, the newly-appointed mining manager. The mine had been in operation for the previous four months. It was situated "on a Pine ridge, and throughout the whole length of the ridge (about half-a-mile) indications of ore are apparent". The ore was varied, "consisting of blue and red carbonate, red and black oxide, and is of very high quality". The writer was of the opinion the Cobar mine "promises to be one of the richest copper mines Australia has yet produced".

The South Cobar Mining Company built a furnace at Cobar and in May 1875 commenced smelting operations. Soon afterwards two additional furnaces and a refinery were built. In December 1875 the Cobar Copper Mining Company amalgamated with the South Cobar Mining Company to form the Great Cobar Copper Mining Company Ltd. It and subsequent companies operated a number of light railways carrying ore and similar material, as well as timber for mine supports. Cobar and many mining outskirts accommodated the miners who travelled to the area in the late 1880s. The overwhelming majority of these were of Cornish Australian stock at the time.

=== Gold ===
Although Cobar is best known as a copper mining area, it has also been a significant goldfield. The first significant gold producing mine at Cobar was the Chesney Mine. The New Occidental Mine is regarded as having been the most productive gold mine in New South Wales. Gold was also produced by refining the copper smelted from copper ores, this was first done in the Great Cobar electrolytic copper refinery at Lithgow.

=== Silver ===
Wonawinta mine, a significant silver mine, operates in the Cobar Basin.

=== Cobar township ===
In March 1881 the settlement at Cobar was described as "large and scattered, as mining towns generally are, composed chiefly of huts and cottages, which lie about in all directions and cover an extensive area of ground". The population was estimated to number 2,500 consisting "principally of miners and their families". The township was "divided into three portions", described as "the Government Township, the Private Township (or that upon the land taken up by or belonging to the company working the mine), and Cornish Town", with "the mine and its appurtenances in the centre". Most of the houses, places of business and public buildings were located in the Private Township. In the surveyed Government Township there were "very few houses indeed". Cornish Town was described as "pretty thickly populated". The "want of water" was described as "the great drawback to the comfort of the inhabitants of Cobar" and on a number of occasions "the people have been upon the verge of a water famine". Government-constructed tanks relying on rainfall was the principal means of household supply and the watering of stock, supplemented by "small tanks sunk in the ground" beside many of the houses.

A description of Cobar published in April 1888 noted that "the houses generally are substantially built; many of them being of brick", with a number of "weather-board and iron buildings and some adobe or clay houses" scattered throughout the town. The courthouse was described as "a handsome brick structure in Barton-street" with a jail next to it. The township had nine hotels, "the principal ones being the Cobar and the Commercial", and two banks, "the Commercial and the Joint Stock". The writer was of the opinion that "Cobar owes its existence as a town largely to the Great Cobar Copper Mine, although the pastoral properties have also contributed in a great measure to make it a fairly prosperous inland settlement".

Several fine heritage buildings from the late 1880s/early 1900s settlement are still in existence, including the Great Western Hotel (1898), claimed to have the longest verandah (at 91 metres) in New South Wales, the Cobar Post Office (1885), the Cobar Court House (1887) and Court House Hotel (1895) in Barton Street, as well as the Cobar Heritage and Visitor Information Centre, located in the former Mines Office (1910). On Hillston Road southeast out of town is Fort Bourke Hill, which affords a view of the town, as well as the historic Towser's Huts, a series of stone miners' cottages dating back as early as the 1890s, possibly even the 1870s, and built by an Italian miner by the name of Antonio Tozzi.

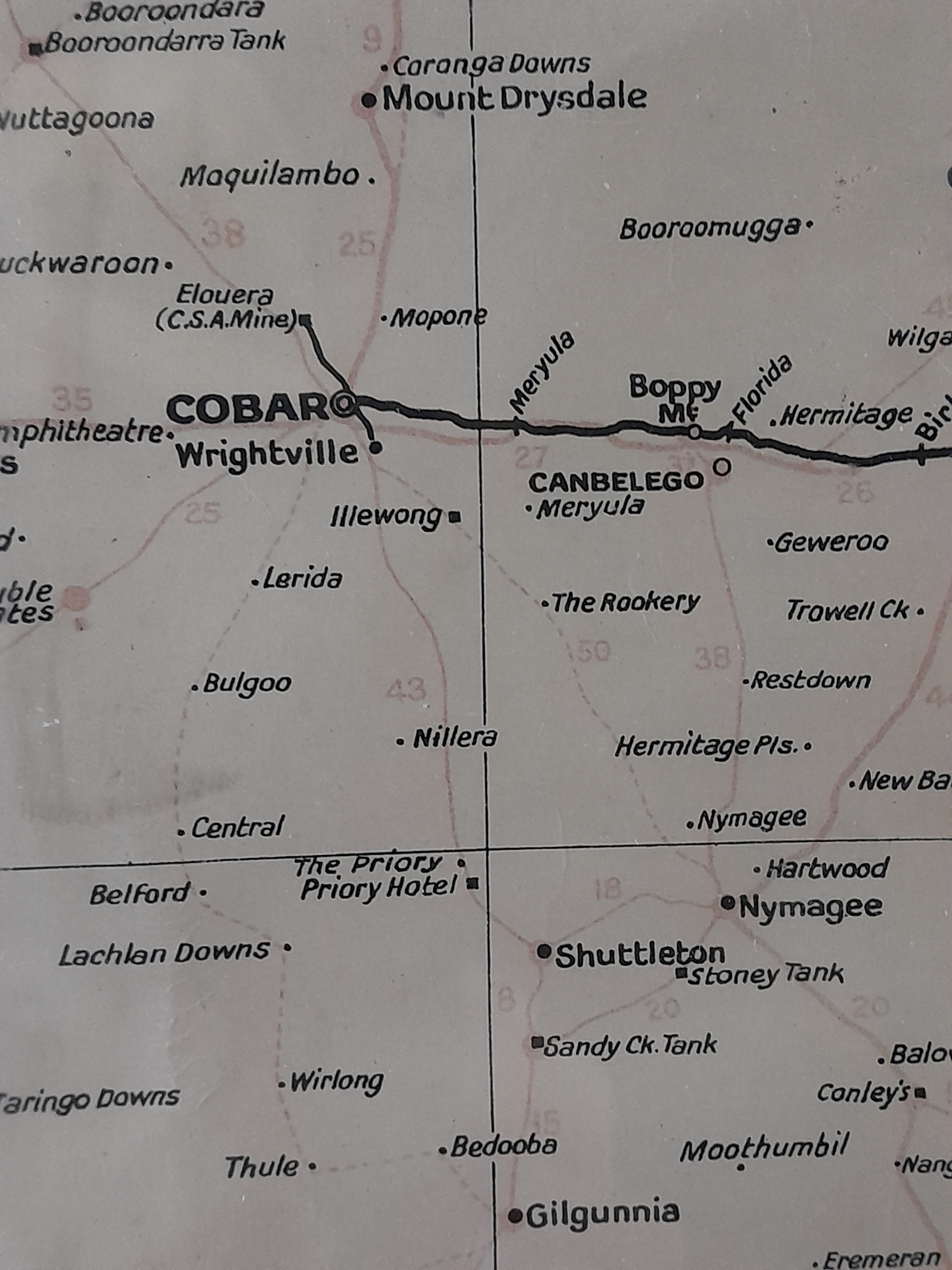
Cobar and surrounding mining settlements.

At its peak, Cobar had a population of 10,000. It also became the regional centre for nearby mining villages, such as Elouera, Illewong, Wrightville, Dapville, and The Peak, and some further away such as Canbelego, Mount Drysdale, Nymagee and Shuttleton. However, mining operations in the area had virtually ceased by the early 1920s. In March 1919, the vast Great Cobar mine, Cobar's main employer, closed. The Chesney Mine had used the Great Cobar's smelters, and it too closed in March 1919. Then came the unexpected closure, due to an underground fire, of the C.S.A. Mine, located to the north of the Cobar township, at Elouera, in March 1920. The Gladstone Mine, at Wrightville closed, around May 1920, because it was reliant upon the copper smelters at the CSA Mine, which closed at that time. The Occidental gold mine, at Wrightville, closed in July 1921. Last, in September 1921, hard rock mining ceased at the Mount Boppy Gold Mine, further away at Canbelego, and the remaining surface operations closed during 1922. In less than four years, all the major mines in the Cobar region had closed. The town was saved by the reopening of the old Occidental gold mine, in 1933, thereafter known as the New Occidental mine, and the Chesney Mine in 1937. These mines both closed in 1952.

By the 1930s the town's population had dropped to little over 1,000, only to rise again and stabilise at around 3,500 through the 1970s and early 1980s. Copper mining was intermittent until 1965 when full-time operations resumed.

In the 1980s, gold, silver, lead and zinc were discovered in the area, which led to a further population increase. The town's current positive economic development is due to the affluence of the mining boom. Three important mining belts are operational in the Cobar area: the Cobar belt, the Canbelego belt and the Girilambone belt. Visits to mine sites may be arranged through the Cobar Heritage and Visitor Information Centre overlooking the open cut mine. The Festival of the Miners' Ghost, held during the last weekend in October, is a festival celebrating the spirits of the old miners.

The area of Cobar also includes the now empty sites of the former villages of Wrightville and Dapville, and the informal settlement of Cornish Town. Further away, but at locations now within the area of Cobar, are the empty sites of two other former mining settlements, Illewong and Elouera. There was also a village site at The Peak, proclaimed in 1897.

== Heritage listings ==
Cobar has a number of heritage-listed sites, including:

- Nyngan–Cobar railway: Cobar railway station
- 47 Linsley Street: Cobar Post Office
- Nyngan Road (Barrier Highway): Cobar Visitor's Centre / Great Cobar Heritage Centre (also known as Cobar Pastoral & Mining Museum; Mining Administration Offices, Great Cobar Mines)
- Nyngan Road (Barrier Highway): Mines Office (former)

=== New Occidental Hotel fire ===
The New Occidental Hotel was a pub located on the edge of town and was built in 1879; it was known as the Star Hotel at that time. It became a significant local spot for miners as well as a common meeting place for groups and clubs in the area. In August 2014 a fire engulfed the building and resulted in the death of a firefighter who died of his injuries at Dubbo Base Hospital.

== Demographics ==
Historical population
Year	Pop.	±%
1921	1,437	—
1933	1,163	−19.1%
1947	2,039	+75.3%
1954	2,224	+9.1%
1961	2,178	−2.1%
1966	2,350	+7.9%
1971	3,756	+59.8%
1976	3,339	−11.1%
1981	3,583	+7.3%
1986	4,287	+19.6%
1991	4,138	−3.5%
1996	4,524	+9.3%
2001	4,105	−9.3%
2006	4,128	+0.6%
2011	3,817	−7.5%
2016	3,748	−1.8%
2021	3,369	−10.1%
Source: Australian Bureau of Statistics data.

According to the 2021 census of Population, there were 3,369 people in Cobar.

- Aboriginal and Torres Strait Islander people made up 14.7% of the population.
- 70.8% of people were born in Australia and 79.4% of people only spoke English at home.
- The most common responses for religion were Catholic 28.9%, No Religion 28.0% and Anglican 13.2%.

== Economy ==
The Cobar economy relies heavily on trade with the local mines and their employees, and consequently on world metal prices and hence is subject to great fluctuations. During 2008, after a fall of 75% in world zinc prices, one local mine cut 540 of its 655 jobs, with flow-on effects felt by many other businesses. Over the course of that year Cobar's workforce reduced by 10%. The town has increasing benefit from being the seat of the local government area. Cobar has two primary schools, a high school, an activities youth centre and a 31-bed hospital for acute care.

=== Cobar Quid ===
The local council supports a local currency called Cobar Quid. Established in 2003 by the Cobar Business Association Inc. (CBA), Cobar Quid is a currency that encourages its residents to shop locally. This local currency is a minted medallion that can be exchanged for goods and services with accepting local businesses.

The CBA sells the coins to the local business in values of $5, $10, $20 and $50 values, and the medallions are minted by the Royal Australian Mint.

Business can redeem the medallions for cash which is controlled by the Cobar Shire Council.

== Climate ==
Cobar has a hot semi-arid climate (Köppen: BSh) with long, very hot summers and short, cool winters, with low rainfall that is spread rather evenly across the year. Seasonal range is considerable in both maximum and minimum temperatures. It is very sunny, with 156.1 clear days and 3,297.6 hours of sunshine annually. The highest temperature recorded at Cobar was 47.8 °C (118.0 °F) on 26 February 1889 and again on 11 January 1939, while the lowest recorded was −6.7 °C (19.9 °F) on 28 July 1881.

Climate data for Cobar (31º32'S 145º48'E, 218−260 AMSL) (1993−2024, extremes to 1881, sunshine 1978−2010)
Month	Jan	Feb	Mar	Apr	May	Jun	Jul	Aug	Sep	Oct	Nov	Dec	Year
Record high °C (°F)	47.8 (118.0)	47.8 (118.0)	43.3 (109.9)	41.1 (106.0)	34.4 (93.9)	30.0 (86.0)	28.3 (82.9)	32.6 (90.7)	38.4 (101.1)	43.9 (111.0)	45.7 (114.3)	47.2 (117.0)	47.8 (118.0)
Mean daily maximum °C (°F)	35.7 (96.3)	33.8 (92.8)	30.6 (87.1)	25.8 (78.4)	20.5 (68.9)	17.0 (62.6)	16.4 (61.5)	18.9 (66.0)	23.1 (73.6)	26.8 (80.2)	30.3 (86.5)	33.5 (92.3)	26.0 (78.9)
Mean daily minimum °C (°F)	21.0 (69.8)	19.9 (67.8)	16.6 (61.9)	11.5 (52.7)	6.7 (44.1)	4.7 (40.5)	3.2 (37.8)	4.2 (39.6)	7.8 (46.0)	11.6 (52.9)	15.6 (60.1)	18.2 (64.8)	11.8 (53.2)
Record low °C (°F)	7.8 (46.0)	7.2 (45.0)	0.6 (33.1)	0.0 (32.0)	−3.4 (25.9)	−4.8 (23.4)	−6.7 (19.9)	−5.3 (22.5)	−2.3 (27.9)	0.6 (33.1)	3.9 (39.0)	4.4 (39.9)	−6.7 (19.9)
Average rainfall mm (inches)	36.5 (1.44)	37.2 (1.46)	30.2 (1.19)	21.8 (0.86)	26.1 (1.03)	33.0 (1.30)	21.2 (0.83)	19.2 (0.76)	28.7 (1.13)	31.9 (1.26)	37.2 (1.46)	25.8 (1.02)	350.4 (13.80)
Average rainy days (≥ 1.0 mm)	3.7	3.4	3.1	2.3	3.2	4.2	3.3	2.8	3.4	3.8	4.2	3.2	40.6
Average afternoon relative humidity (%)	24	31	30	33	43	51	50	38	34	29	28	23	35
Average dew point °C (°F)	8.1 (46.6)	9.9 (49.8)	8.4 (47.1)	6.2 (43.2)	5.8 (42.4)	5.6 (42.1)	4.3 (39.7)	2.6 (36.7)	3.8 (38.8)	3.2 (37.8)	5.9 (42.6)	5.3 (41.5)	5.8 (42.4)
Mean monthly sunshine hours	334.8	291.0	297.6	267.0	229.4	192.0	217.0	260.4	273.0	303.8	303.0	328.6	3,297.6
Percentage possible sunshine	78	78	78	79	70	63	68	76	76	76	74	75	74
Source: Bureau of Meteorology (means 1993−2024 [Airport AWS], extremes to 1881 [Post Office], sunshine 1978−2010 [MO])

== Notable people ==
- Lilliane Brady, mayor for over 20 years and the longest-serving female mayor in NSW history
- Nik Kosef, former professional rugby league footballer for the Manly-Warringah Sea Eagles, 1996 premiership player, NSW & Australia representative
- Robert William Rankin, commander of HMAS Yarra (U77) in 1942, namesake of HMAS Rankin (SSG 78) commissioned in 2003.
- Ernie Toshack, cricketer, member of Bradman's Invincibles
- Dora Birtles, novelist and writer.
- Muriel O'Malley, opera singer and musical theatre actress

== Gallery ==
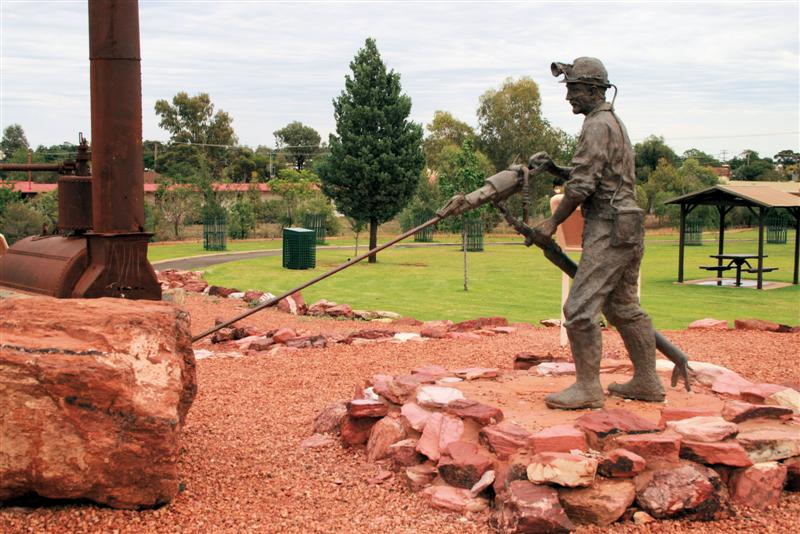
Miners Heritage Park, Cobar

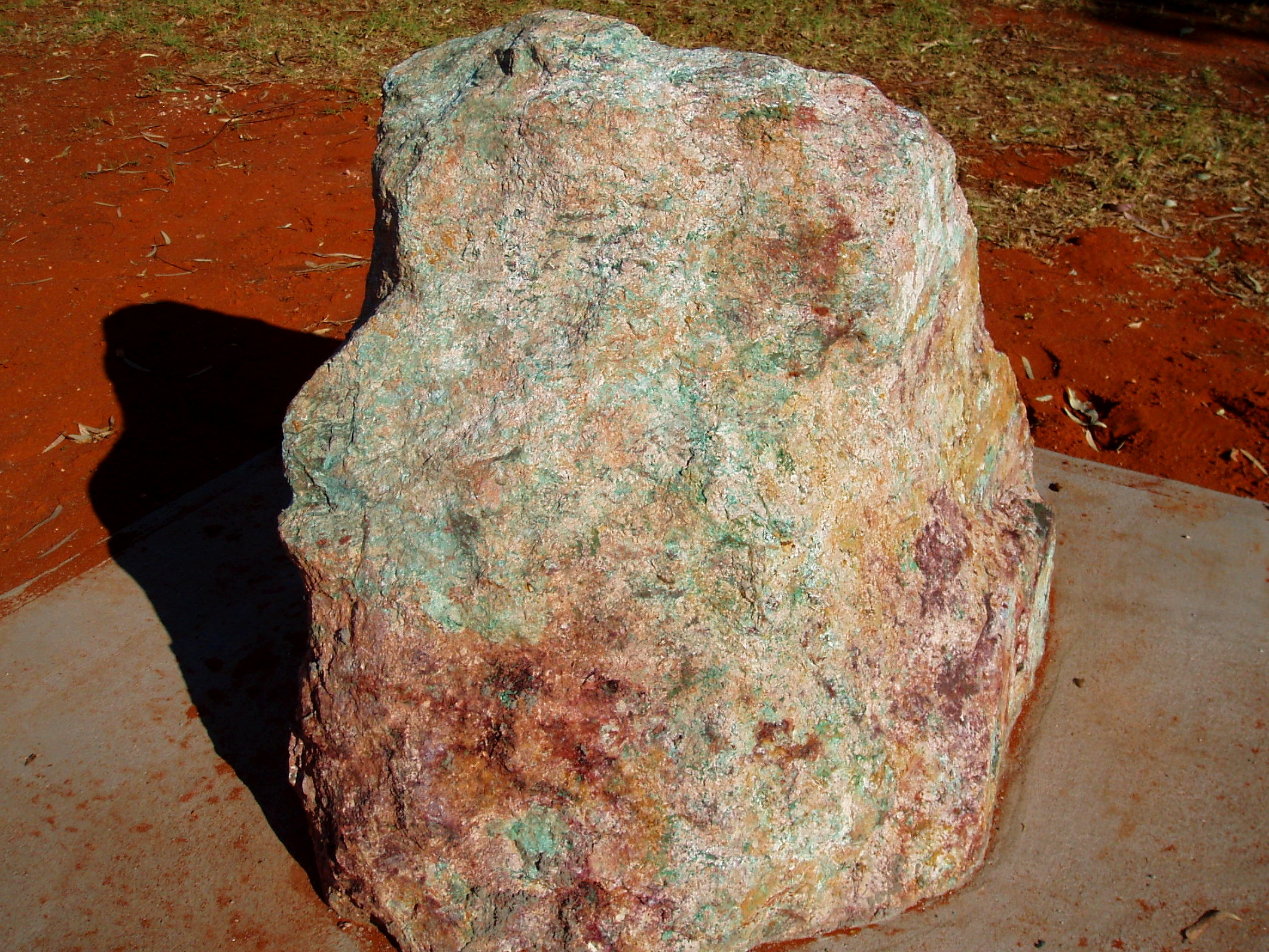
Rock with copper ore

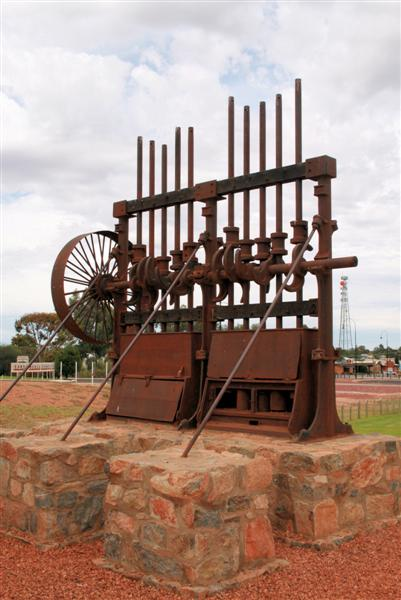
Battery

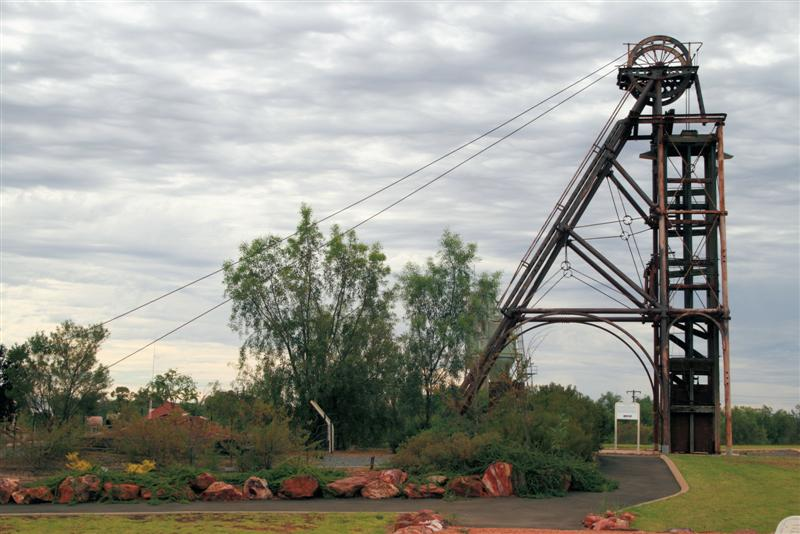
Elevator

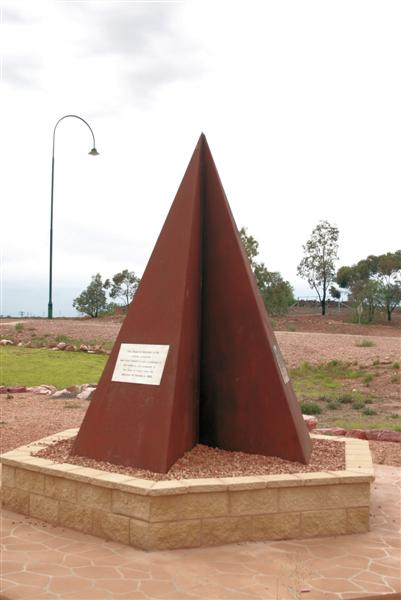
Monument to the miners who lost their lives

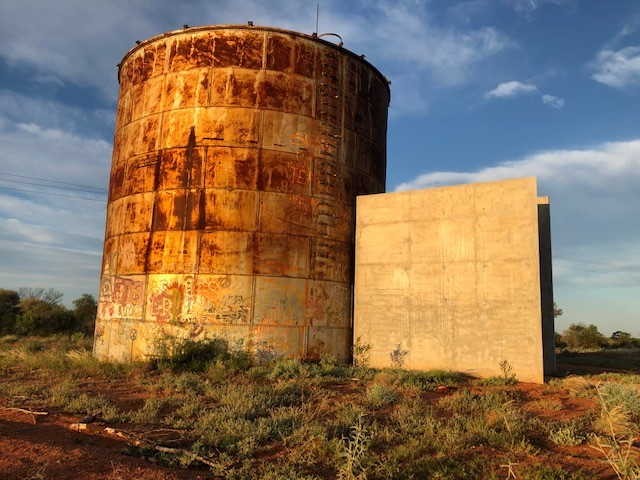
Cobar Sound Chapel
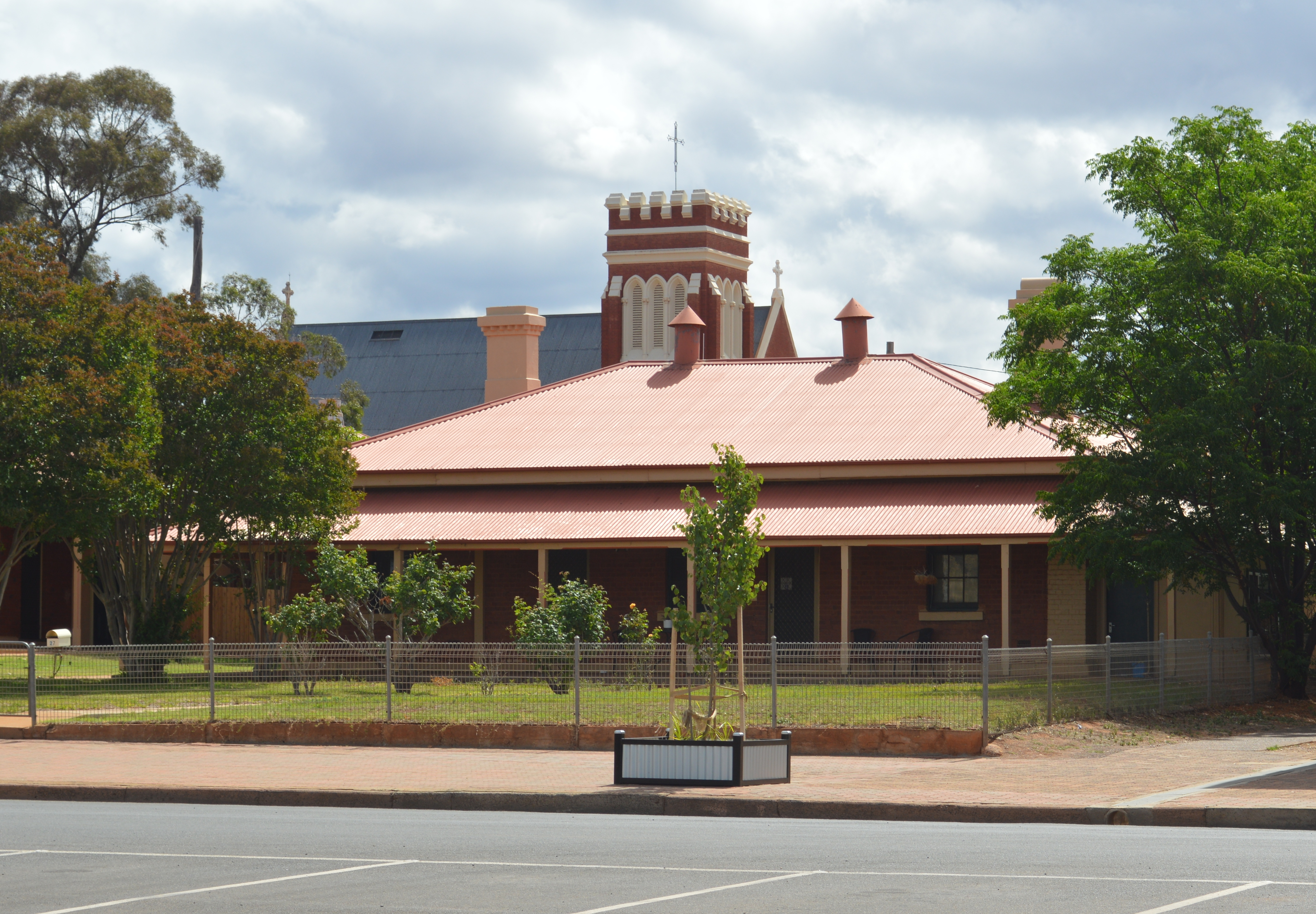
Cobar Police station in Barton St, with St Laurence O’Toole Catholic Church in the background

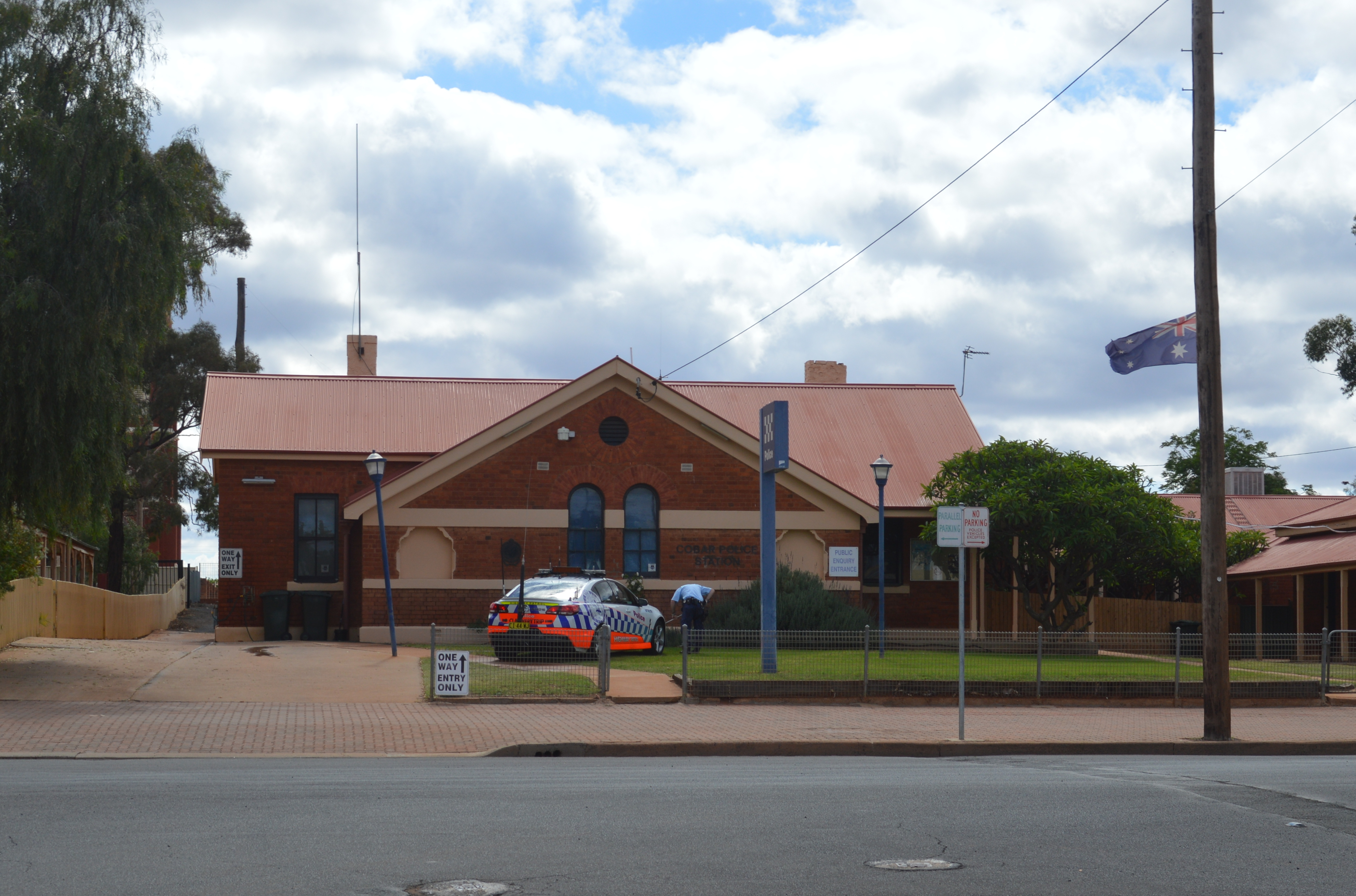
Cobar Police station

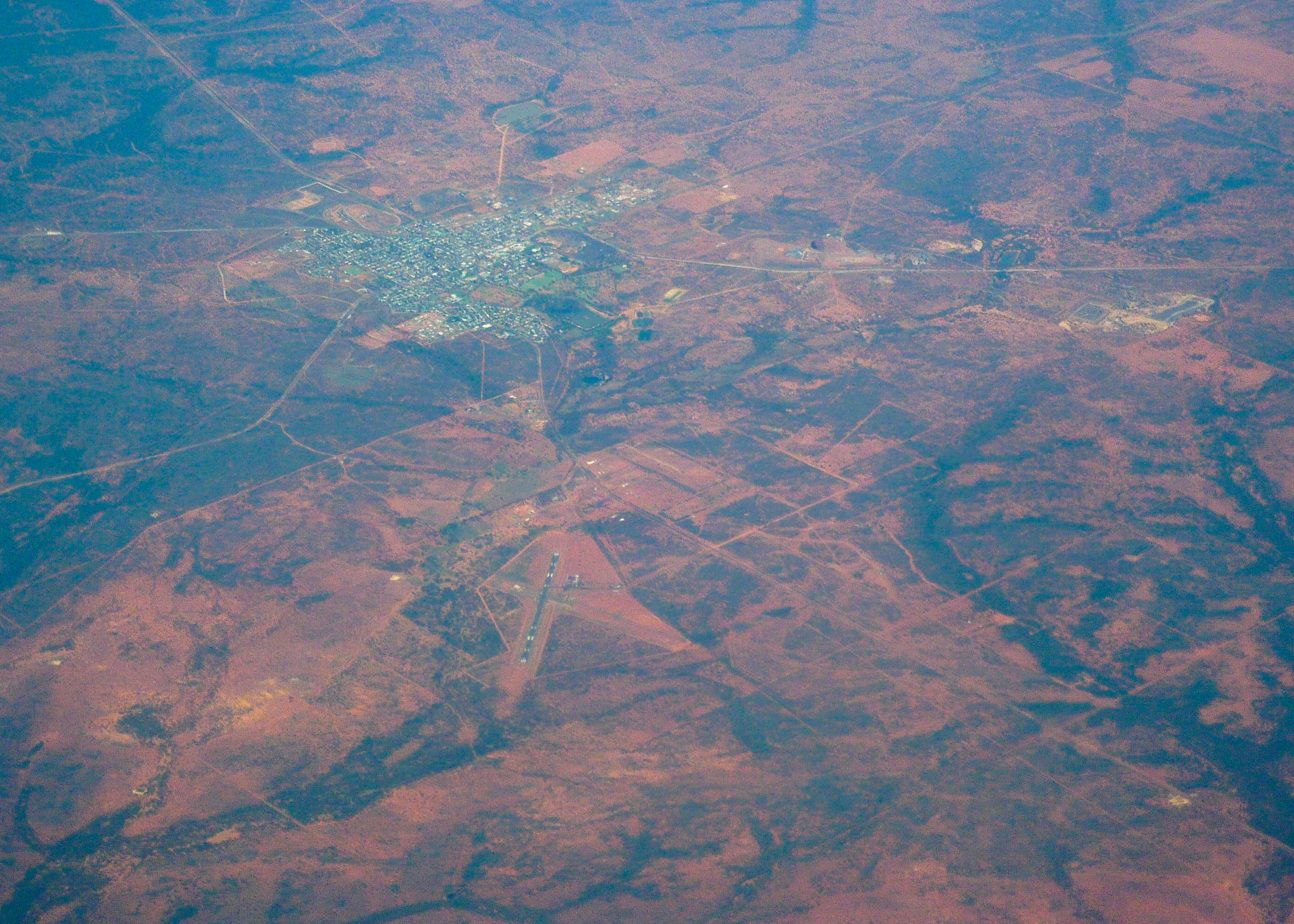
Aerial view 2009

== Media ==
=== Newspapers ===
The Cobar Herald was the local newspaper for the region from 1879 to 1914. The local newspaper today is The Cobar Weekly, a community newspaper first printed on 6 February 1986.

=== Television ===
Cobar receives commercial television services from Alice Springs/Mount Isa, including but not limited to:

- Seven Central – Seven Network owned and operated
- Imparja Television – Nine Network affiliate
- Central Digital Television – Network 10 affiliate, joint venture between Seven West Media and Imparja Television

In addition to remote commercial television offerings, Cobar also receives Seven Network owned and operated channels from Orange, formerly Prime7.

=== Radio ===
Cobar has a selection of radio stations on relay servicing the Central West, including the following:

- 972 AM – 2DU, commercial
- 88.0 FM – Vision Christian Radio, narrowcast
- 101.3 FM – triple j, national
- 106.1 FM – ABC Western Plains, national

== Transport ==
=== Train and Bus Services ===
NSW TrainLink operates a coach service from Dubbo. The train line through Cobar is today used primarily for industrial train services. See Cobar railway line.

=== Airport ===
Cobar Airport is a small, local airport located 5.6 km southwest of town.
