= Cobar Post Office =

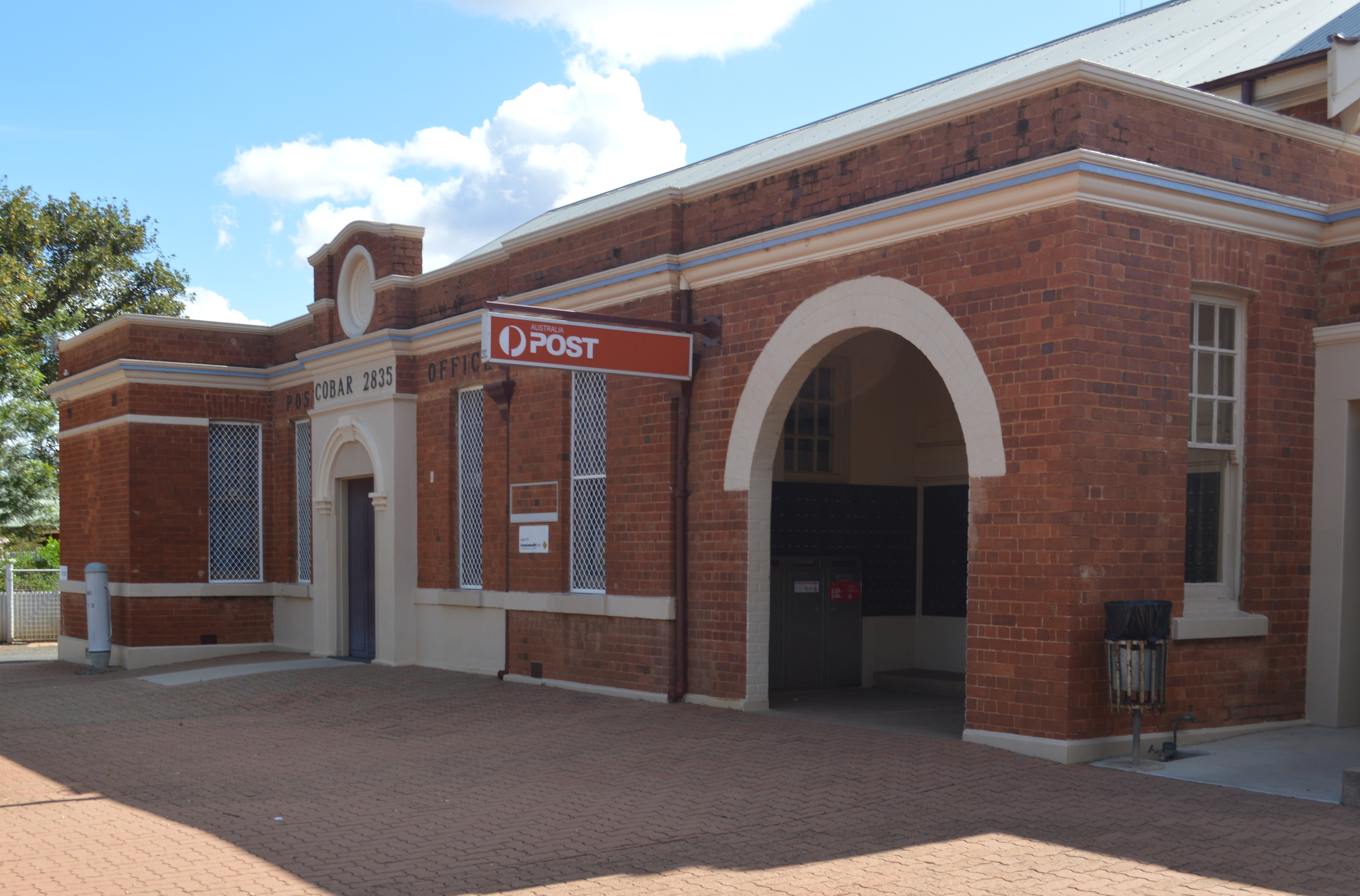

- Location within New South Wales
- 31.4996°S 145.8378°E
- Location: 47 Linsley Street, Cobar, New South Wales, Australia

Site notes
- Architects: James Barnet; Walter Liberty Vernon

Commonwealth Heritage List
- Official name: Cobar Post Office
- Type: Listed place (Historic)
- Designated: 22 August 2012
- Reference no.: 106178

Cobar Post Office is a heritage-listed post office at 47 Linsley Street, Cobar, New South Wales, Australia. It was designed by James Barnet in 1885. It was added to the Australian Commonwealth Heritage List on 22 August 2012.

== History ==
In late 1872, a petition was made to the Postmaster General for the establishment of a weekly mail service between Bourke and the Cobar Mine. The service was established on 1 March 1873 with the first Postmaster being Charles Claxton, a storekeeper at the Cobar Mine, and the post office was run from the store owned by the mining company. Subsequent premises for the post office appear to have been those owned by the Postmaster at the time and included an inn (which was a source of some complaint), and various stores.

By mid-1881 the Colonial Architect had been asked to design a new post and telegraph office, and the tender was let in July 1884. The new brick building opened on 15 August 1885.and was a post "office" only, without an associated residence, and comprised an office some 26 ft wide and 24 ft deep internally, and two lobby areas sited either side of a porch.

The building was designed during James Barnet's term as New South Wales Government Architect. Early photographs show that the original structure comprised one large, high-ceilinged post-room with a gable roof running parallel to the street. On the front (east) façade, but not taking up its full width, was a central porch flanked on both sides by small rooms each used as a lobby in which a sloping writing board was provided for public use. The porch featured a rendered Italianate-styled arched entryway on its façade which can still be seen on the present building, but did not have a door at this face.

A specification for the erection of additions and general repairs at the Cobar Post and Telegraph Office is dated 11 October 1907 and it appears that by 1909 the building had undergone the substantial alterations which brought it to its present general appearance.

The original building (1885) was designed by the New South Wales Colonial Architect's Office under James Barnet (1862–1890) with the alterations in 1892, 1899 and c.1907–1909 by the New South Wales Government Architect's Office under Walter Vernon (1891–1911).

== Description ==
Cobar Post Office is at 47 Linsley Street, Cobar, comprising the whole of Lot 222 DP733322.

The Cobar Post Office is sited on the west side of Linsley Street, one block south of Marshall Street and the main highway. The streetscape comprises a heterogeneous mix of residential, commercial, recreation and civic uses. The building is located directly to the south of the Cobar Council Chambers.

A brown brick Telecom Exchange of more recent origin is located to the west of the post office building, and is not included in the heritage listing.

The present Cobar Post Office comprises part of a single room Post Office constructed in 1885, a residence constructed in 1892, alterations to part of the front façade in 1899, and substantial extensions and alterations to the front facade and original postal room in c.1907–1909.

The appearance of the Cobar Post Office, as seen from Linsley Street, is essentially as it was following the major alterations undertaken c.1907–09. The front (east) façade essentially presents as an asymmetrical parapeted single storey "screen" in front of a large gable roofed, double height structure, all constructed of red face brick. The rendered Italianate-styled arched entryway is located slightly left of centre and is surmounted by a squared "pediment" featuring an inset circular panel edged with egg and dart moulding and a deep convex-curved edge mould. The pediment is topped with a bowed cornice.

Two flanking bays are slightly recessed back from this entrance section and feature tall timber framed windows, each with a plain lower light and a multi-paned upper light. To the left, or southern, end of this configuration, which dates from the 1899 alterations, is a dominant projecting section constructed in c.1907–09. It also features tall windows, although the window originally on the front elevation has been removed at some stage and the opening bricked in. In the matching position towards the right or northern end of the main façade is another windowed bay, which also dates from the 1899 alterations and is set slightly forward of the adjacent bays. The final bay at the north end comprises an open porch housing private post boxes with a large open arch on the front façade and a window, which matches those from the 1899 alterations, in the north facade.

The somewhat disparate elements of the facade are tied together through the use of a full-length, solid parapet with cornice mouldings and a deeply moulded string course, all which returned down the sides of this front "screen". The flat arched heads to the windows are also joined by a single moulded string course which runs across the façade and returns down the sides. At sill level a flat mould (of the same height as the painted, dressed stone sills) similarly joins these elements across the façade. At the base is a rendered and painted plinth. Single letters of metal spell out COBAR 2835 above the arched entry, and the words POST and OFFICE are located in the flanking bays above the windows.

The main postal room behind is a double-height rectangular structure with a gable roof, clad in short sheets of corrugated galvanised iron, running parallel to the street. The two long facades are blank and partly screened by the front and rear sections of the remainder of the building. The shorter south façade features three square highlight windows below which are another three openings, one door on the westernmost side and two windows. The north façade features two square highlight windows, while the lower half is fronted by a skillion roofed verandah which was lined out at some later date to form a storage room and an additional porch for private post boxes.

Each end of the gable roof is edged with timber bargeboards, originally rounded at the ends but now squared off, which are bound together at the apex with a ridge post and transverse joist. The original decorative frieze infills are no longer in place. A carved decorative bracket is also sited at each end of the transverse joist and at the end of each of the bargeboards. There is a rendered and painted chimney with a decorative corbelled head projecting through the ridge at the north end of the gable roof.

The Postmaster's residence at the rear is essentially rectangular in form and projects back into the site perpendicular to the postal room. The pitched roof is clad with short sheets of corrugated galvanised iron and intersects into the rear plane of the gable roof to the postal room. At the other end, the roof finishes with a hip, the west plane of which continues to form a skillion roof over the end section. There a number of rendered and painted chimneys with decorative corbelled heads projecting through the roof.

A skillion roofed verandah runs alongside the long north façade and returns along the adjacent west façade of the postal room. The timber posts are stop chamfered and original lace brackets are no longer in place. Part of the verandah adjacent to the residence is enclosed to form a "sleep-out" partially lined with flywire inserted between the timber studs of the frame. The external brick wall to this area has been painted; the rest of the walling is red face brick.

The original locations of small rosette vents (as seen in c.1892 photographs but since removed and the openings plastered over) can be seen along the exposed wall surface above the junction of the verandah and the main wall of the residence, and are also located in the same high location on the south façade as well as in the lower part of the wall on both of these facades. Windows are generally timber framed and double hung with two panes per sash; those to the east side of the entrance door on the north façade have been opened up to ground level. The window sills are painted dressed stone.

On the south façade a recessed section of the residence directly adjacent to the postal room has been infilled at a later date with a skillion roofed area lined with fibre-cement sheet and glazing. Internally the postal room is very plain, the only decorative detailing being timber arch brackets to the edges of the squared openings between the front section and the postal room. The ceiling consists of sheet panels with strapping to the joints and may be more recent than the c.1907-09 alterations. The fireplaces have been closed off but one still features a simple timber mantelpiece with decorative support brackets.

The doorway between the postal room and the residence has a deep reveal and a decorative architrave. The timber panelled door features a decorative metal door handle and has a hopper opening fanlight over. The lunch room, storage and office area has timber framed walling lined with cement sheets with strapping over the joints, all of which appear to be of a later date than the comprehensive c.1907-09 alterations.

Introduced partitions to about 2400mm height divide the retail area from the mail room but do not obscure an understanding of the volume of the overall space. At an unknown date, but after a photograph of the building was taken in 1946, the verandah area alongside the main post-room was lined out internally and externally to form a long, narrow storage area, and an open porch area with a brick entry, the latter adjacent to the main façade.

In possibly the 1970s, and maybe earlier, the space between the post office and the municipal offices was infilled with a brown brick structure incorporating a ramp. As with Northam and a few other remaining post offices, Cobar has a quarters component which is currently let as a rental property. The residence was not able to be viewed on the date of the inspection.

=== Key elements ===
- overall building form, including details of face brickwork, rendered decorative mouldings, dressed stone sills, and roof forms and chimneys
- free-standing form and relationship to surrounding streetscape and the adjacent Council Chambers

=== Condition ===
The building is in good condition but has undergone extensive changes to its form and appearance. Externally and internally, the building appears to be in relatively sound condition, well maintained and with no major defects visible.

=== Original fabric ===
- Structural frame: load bearing masonry walls with timber framed roofs, stone or concrete footings
- External walls: red face brick, with rendered decorative mouldings to front façade.
- Internal walls: generally brick with plaster render, paint finish; introduced partition walls - metal or timber stud framed, painted plasterboard or painted cement sheet with straps over joints
- Floor: timber framed and timber floor boards generally covered with carpet in the retail and office areas, vinyl tiling in the sorting area and storage areas, and ceramic tiling in the wet areas.
- Ceiling: ceilings are predominantly lined with fibre-cement sheets with ceiling straps. It is possible that they conceal earlier timber ceiling boards. The verandah alongside the residence and the arched open porch has timber board ceiling linings. Fluorescent tube troffer-form light fittings throughout are introduced and predominantly suspended and there is an introduced air conditioning duct running along the rear wall of the main postal room.
- Roof: timber-framed, generally clad in short sheets of corrugated galvanised metal; lined eaves; overpainted brick chimneys with corbelled tops
- Other: painted dressed stone sills; timber-framed double-hung windows with multi-paned sashes; the sign Cobar Post Office 2835 picked out in individual metal letters.

=== Summary of development and/or alteration ===
- 1885 – completion of single room Post Office with two projecting lobbies
- 1892 – completion of residence attached to rear of Post Office
- 1899 – alterations to part of front façade
- c.1907–1909 – substantial extensions and alterations to the front facade and original Post Office room
- c.1990s – Standard Australia Post retail fit-out to the front area of ground floor

== Heritage listing ==
Historically, Cobar Post Office has been an important local postal building for over 120 years, being built in 1885 to a design by the New South Wales Colonial Architect's Office under James Barnet, and subsequently altered and extended during successive phases. The latter works, from 1892 through to c.1907–1909 were under the aegis of architect Walter Vernon, and responded to the ongoing and evolving needs of the town in regard to postal and telecommunication services. The works included the addition of a substantial residence in 1892. The original postal service in the town dates back to 1873, with the establishment of a weekly mail service between Bourke and the Cobar Mine. The post office's relationship to the historic Cobar Municipal Council Chambers to the north, enhances this aspect of significance (criterion a).

Aesthetically, Cobar Post Office, although an altered and evolved building has a strong visual presence in its streetscape context, enhanced by the unpainted face brick exterior and contrasting white rendered bands, decorative mouldings, dressed stone sills, and detailing. The aesthetic value and presentation of the building also derives from the impact of the asymmetrical parapeted single storey "screen" in front of the large gable roofed, double height structure, and the rendered Italianate-styled arched entryway with pediment above. This value is also enhanced by the complementary relationship with the adjoining Council Chambers, with the two buildings sharing similar materials, scale and proportion as seen from the main street frontages. The post office is additionally identified as one of several "local landmarks" in a local tourism/visitor brochure (criterion e).

The curtilage includes the title block/allotment of the property.

The significant components of Cobar Post Office include the main postal building comprising fabric dating from 1885 through to c.1907–1909, with the main façade to Linsley Street dating from the latter works. The residence to the rear constructed in 1892 is also significant; the site also retains mature vegetation to the rear yard, which contributes to the setting of the property. Non-significant elements include the brown brick infill structure between the post office and the municipal offices. The brown brick Telecom Exchange of more recent origin, located to the west of the post office building, is not included in the heritage listing.

Cobar Post Office was listed on the Australian Commonwealth Heritage List on 22 August 2012 having satisfied the following criteria.

Criterion A: Processes

Cobar Post Office has been an important local postal building for over 120 years, being built in 1885 to a design by the New South Wales Colonial Architect's Office under James Barnet, and subsequently altered and extended during successive phases. The latter works, from 1892 through to c.1907–1909 were under the aegis of architect Walter Vernon, and responded to the ongoing and evolving needs of the town in regard to postal and telecommunication services. The works included the addition of a substantial residence in 1892. The original postal service in the town dates back to 1873, with the establishment of a weekly mail service between Bourke and the Cobar Mine. The post office's relationship to the historic Cobar Council Chambers to the north, enhances this aspect of significance.

Criterion E: Aesthetic characteristics

Cobar Post Office, although an altered and evolved building has a strong visual presence in its streetscape context, enhanced by the unpainted face brick exterior and contrasting white rendered bands, decorative mouldings, dressed stone sills, and detailing. The aesthetic value and presentation of the building also derives from the impact of the asymmetrical parapeted single storey "screen" in front of the large gable roofed, double height structure, and the rendered Italianate-styled arched entryway with pediment above. This value is also enhanced by the complementary relationship with the adjoining Council Chambers, with the two buildings sharing similar materials, scale and proportion (at least as seen from the street frontages). The post office is additionally identified as one of several "local landmarks" in a local tourism/visitor brochure.
