= Elouera, New South Wales =

Ghost town in New South Wales, Australia

Coordinates: 31°25′07″S 145°47′04″E

Elouera was a short-lived mining township, now a ghost town, in the Orana region of New South Wales Australia. The area that it once occupied has always been a part of Cobar, for local government purposes, although the old site lies around 10 km to the north-west of the Cobar township. It was associated with the Cornish, Scottish and Australian Mine (C.S.A. Mine), and was inhabited from 1906 to around 1930. It was also known, unofficially, as 'C.S.A.'

== Location ==
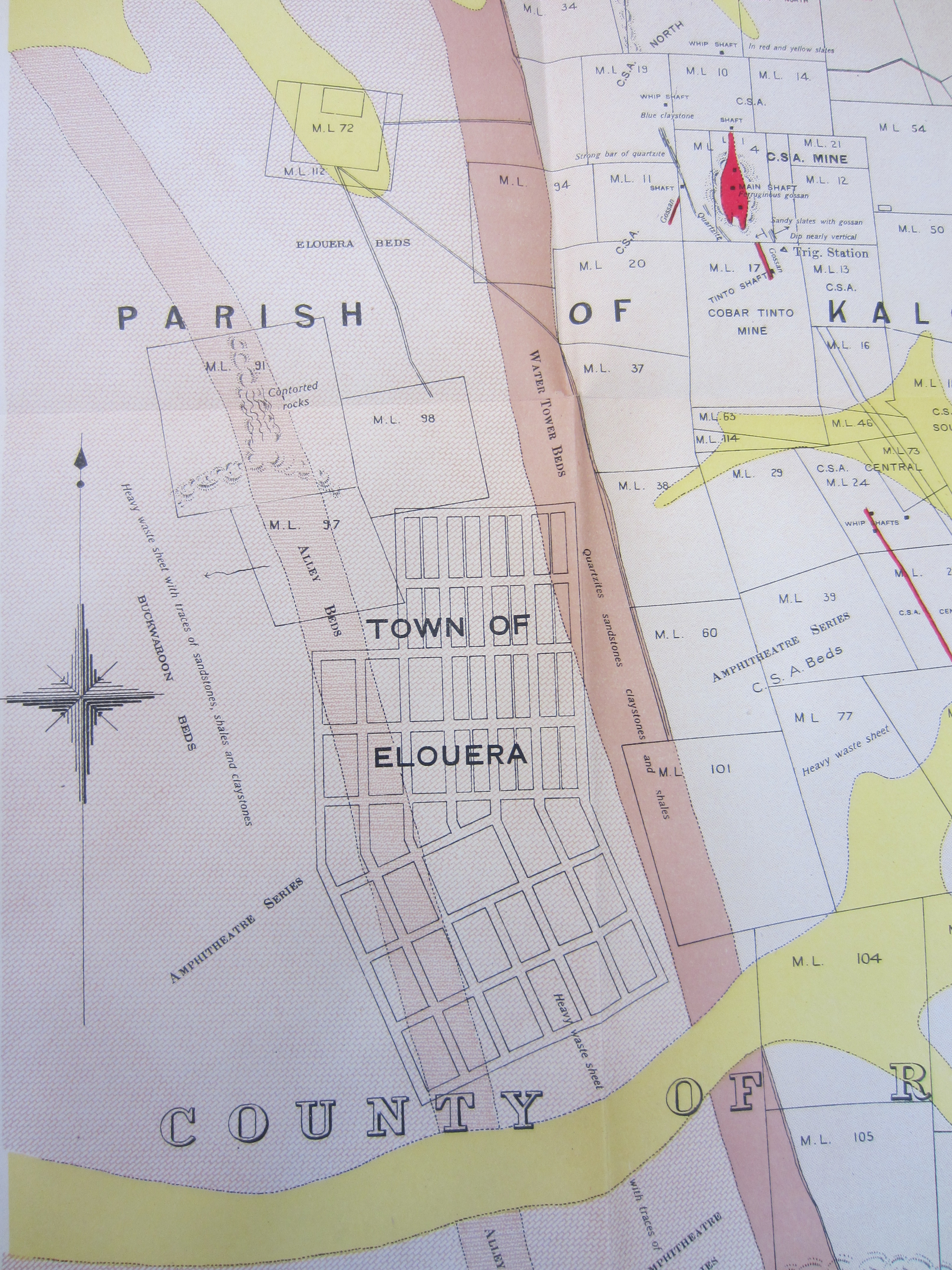
Elouera's site in relation to C.S.A. and Tinto mines.

The area later known as Elouera lies within the traditional lands of Wangaaypuwan dialect speakers (also known as Wangaibon) of Ngiyampaa people, referred to in their own language as Ngiyampaa Wangaaypuwan. After colonial settlement, the area lay in the County of Robinson, Parish of Kaloogleguy.

The settlement of Elouera was north of the road from Cobar to Louth and south-west of the C.S.A. mine site. It was around 10 km, in straight-line distance, north-west of Cobar, but about 22 km by road.

== Name ==
The word 'elouera' is almost certainly derived from a word of Aboriginal origin. There is a type of Aboriginal stone hand tool that has been referred to as an elouera. However, the word may have more than one meaning, or differing meanings in different Aboriginal languages. In the Tharawal language of the coastal Illawarra area, it is said to mean 'a pleasant place near the sea' or 'a high place near the sea'. The words 'elouera' and 'Illawarra', most probably, are derived from the same Tharawal word, which may have been closer to 'allowrie'.

The name, 'Elouera' has been very widely applied by non-indigenous Australians, including for a beach, a surf life-saving club, a ship, a race horse, a colliery, a housing land development, numerous houses and other properties, numerous streets and a light rail station, and even as a girls' baby name.

== History ==
=== Mine and mining settlement ===
==== Origins and early growth (1905-1909) ====
Mineralisation, in outcrops in the area, was first identified in 1872, and led to the first exploratory mining, which gave the mine its name, Cornish, Scottish, and Australian Copper Mine. However, it was soon overshadowed by the large copper deposit of the Great Cobar mine.

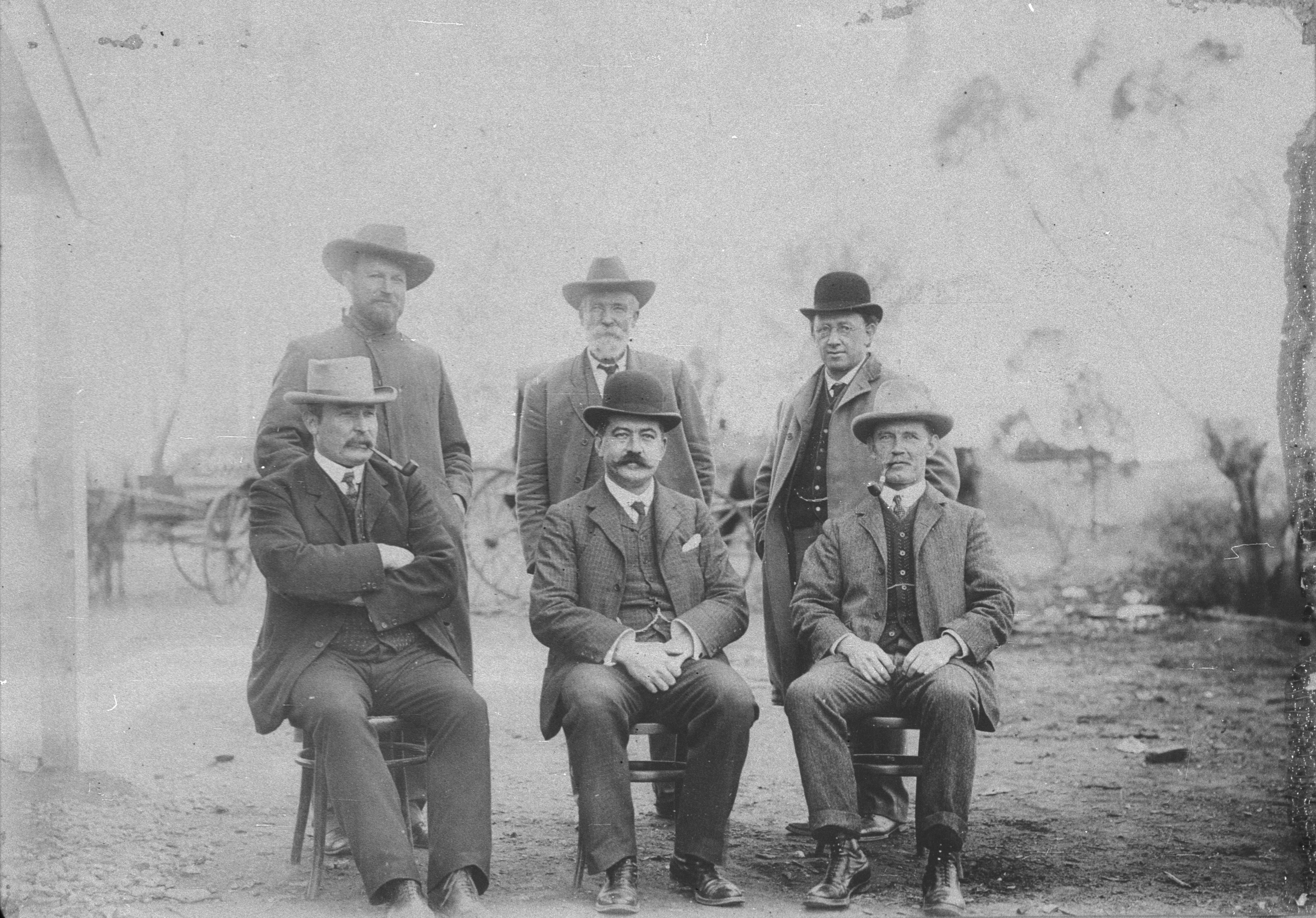
George Blakemore (front row in centre) and other directors of C.S.A. Mines Limited, c.1912 (Collection of Mitchell Library, State Library of NSW)

In 1905, George Blakemore, probably attempting to emulate the success of the Great Cobar Mining Syndicate, established the C.S.A. Development Syndicate, to take over the then moribund C.S.A. Mine.

It was in 1905 that a commercially viable lead-silver deposit was found, and a new company C.S.A. Mines Limited was floated. It was that deposit that was the first successfully mined at the C.S.A. Mine.

In the times before motorised transport, miners needed to live close to their work, and the existing Cobar township was over 22 km away by road. Before Elouera, the area was known as C.S.A. Mines, and the first miners commuted from other places or perhaps camped closer to the mine. In November 1905, the lifeless body of a winding engine driver, married man and father of four Albert Grainger Wakefield Barton, was found crushed between the cogs of the mine winder mechanism. It emerged that Barton had cycled from Cobar to work at the mine, after tending his sick wife overnight. His children became orphans, a little over a year later.

Almost certainly, a settlement developed near the mine around 1906. The Town of Elouera was proclaimed on 6 March 1907. A new hotel and a post office opened there in 1907. There was a school at Elouera, from July 1908. The company erected three houses for its staff and a boarding house for fifty men.

==== Mine expansion and heyday (1910-1919) ====
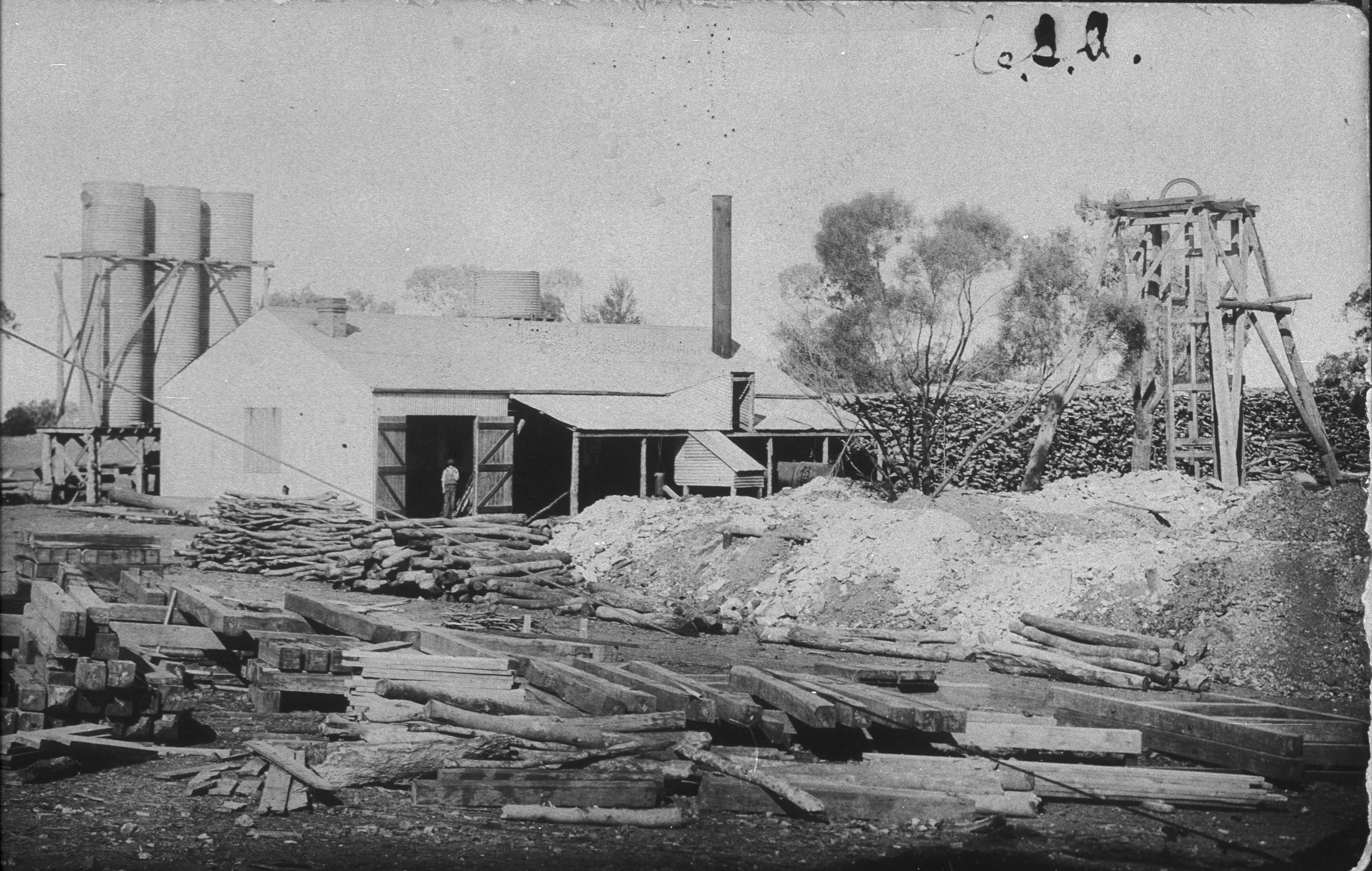
C.S.A. Mine c.1908 (Mitchell Library, State Library of NSW)

In 1909, the CSA Mine closed, when the original lead-silver deposit was exhausted. It reopened, in 1910, after a copper deposit was found. By then, with no returns to shareholders, £100,000 had been spent on exploration and development. Around 1912, the adjacent Tinto Mine was amalgamated with the C.S.A mine, and the two were thereafter worked as one operation. The C.S.A. was becoming one of the larger mines in the Cobar region.

In mid 1916, there were at least five of the village's men away at the First World War. The school closed for short periods during 1915 and 1916–17. It was a half time school, sharing its teacher with Meryula Siding (just to the east of Cobar), from October 1915 to March 1916.

In 1917, the company started production using the first of its water-jacket furnaces at its mine site. In the same year, the C.S.A. company erected another eleven houses for its workers in Elouera. New blocks of land were being put up for sale, in 1917 and in 1920.

Before the holidays began at the end of 1918, the school had 35 pupils using the 16 by 14 foot schoolhouse. In 1919–1920, an existing school building was relocated to Elouera from Mount Drysdale. Another hotel opened around August 1919; Elouera then had two hotels, the new Royal Hotel—its licence transferred from Mt Drysdale—and the Elouera Hotel.

By April 1917, the long-awaited extension of the railway line from Cobar to the C.S.A. Mine was under construction, and it opened in January 1918. One of the reasons used to justify the railway was to ship low-grade 'basic' ore from the C.S.A. to the smelters of the Great Cobar Mine; it would be mixed with Great Cobar's 'silicaceous' ore, as a flux for smelting, replacing limestone brought from much further away by rail. However, at latest by early 1919, there was an acrimonious disagreement, between the managements of the two companies, probably motivated by an underlying unresolved contention over which company would dominate copper production on the Cobar mining field. The outcomes were that Great Cobar did not take any of C.S.A. low-grade ore as flux and the railway was under-utilised, although it was still of great benefit to C.S.A.. Not long afterwards, in March 1919, the Great Cobar mine and its smelters closed, throwing hundreds of men out of work in Cobar. Closure of the Great Cobar resulted in the loss of the source of electrical power used to supply water to the C.S.A. Mine.

C.S.A. decided to build its own smelter and refinery at Kandos, to circumvent an effective monopoly of the electrolytic copper refinery at Port Kembla. The Kandos refinery would obtain its electricity from the adjacent NSW Cement Lime and Coal Company works. There was some ill will toward C.S.A., around Cobar, as a result of decisions it had made.

Just as the future of Elouera was looking bright, the copper price had collapsed in 1919. The mine had to close due to lack of water, during part of 1919. After it reopened, it was employing 250 men. The company had spent more than £200,000 on developing the mine and its furnaces at Elouera. It had spent £32,000 on the electrolytic copper refinery at Kandos, which reused electrolytic tanks from the closed Great Cobar copper refinery at Lithgow. The company had commissioned a second, much larger, water-jacket blast furnace near the mine, in January 1918, which gave satisfactory results producing copper matte, for subsequent smelting and refining, initially at Port Kembla. The smelting section of the new plant at Kandos entered production, around September 1919, but its new electrolytic refinery, although completed, would never enter service.

=== Mine closure and end of Elouera ===
==== Mine fire ====
The rapid decline of Elouera began with the unexpected cessation of mining at the C.S.A. Mine, due to an underground fire that broke out, on the afternoon of Saturday, 20 March 1920. The location of the fire was in the timber supporting the long-abandoned silver-lead ore workings, on No.2 Level of the mine. The ultimate cause of fire was never identified; 'incendiarism' was alleged, and an earlier allegation of a deliberate setting fire to the company's property had been made, in September 1919. Another plausible theory is that the fire was caused by heating, due to oxidisation of sulphide ore and backfill material, which then set alight Oregan timber framing supporting the old workings.

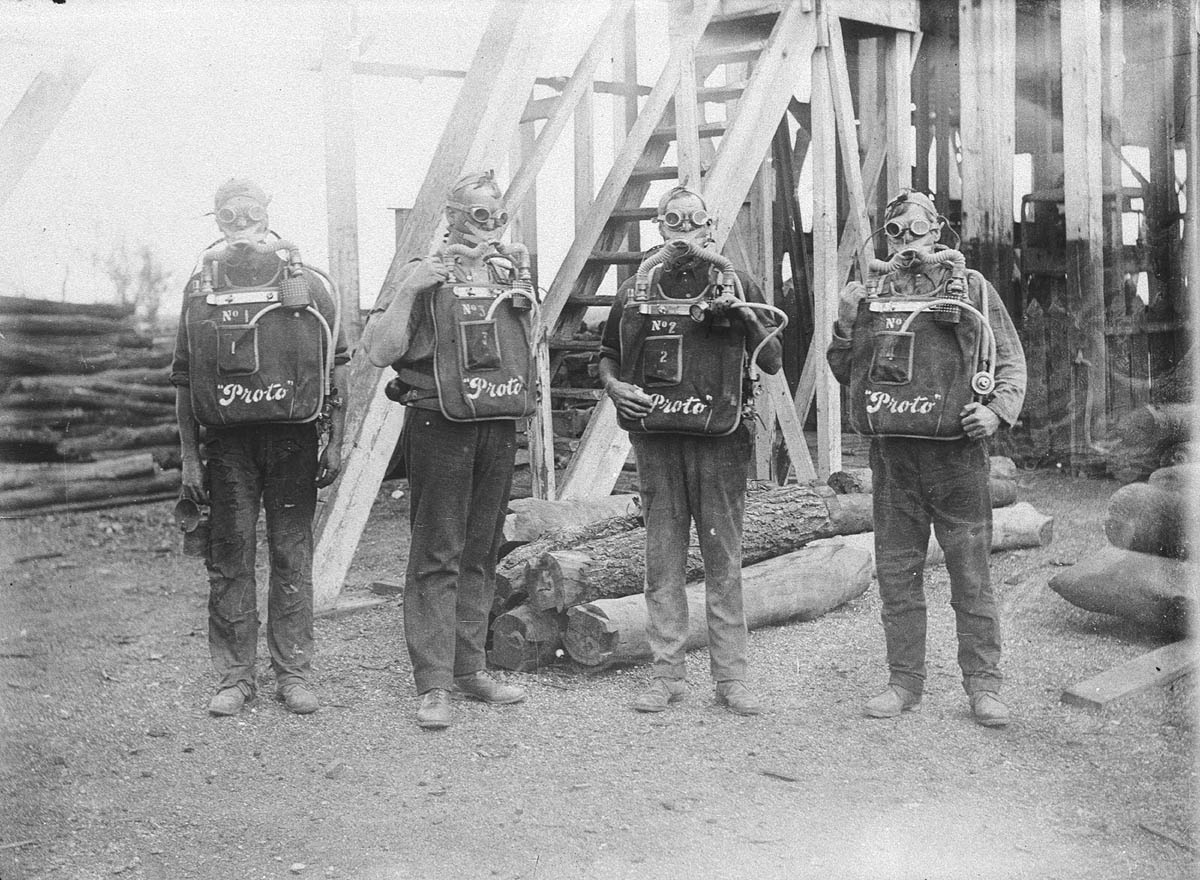
Investigation team wearing 'Proto' breathing apparatus at C.S.A. Mine. (May 1920). (State Library of NSW)

The mine was sealed, in an attempt to extinguish the fire, and initially smelting operations continued. In April 1920, the smelters closed. When the mine was unsealed on 3 May 1920, it was found to be full of dangerous gases, and could only be inspected by men wearing 'Proto smoke helmets', an early type of self-contained breathing apparatus.

The fire broke out again, around 6 May 1920, and spread further into the workings, propelled by flaming carbon monoxide gases. The mine was again sealed, and a decision was taken to ask the government to assist in bringing water by train to flood the mine. That had not happened, by 30 June 1920, when rainfall provided water, which was then used in an attempt to flood the mine, apparently without success. An analysis of the mine air, in April 1921, revealed a 10% carbon monoxide content, close to its lower explosive limit; that was bad enough but the oxygen content was still 13.6%, more than enough oxygen to keep the timber smouldering. The company announced, in November 1921, that with copper prices low, the level of dangerous gases in the mine being high, and the prospect of fire breaking out, the mine would not reopen.

==== Aftermath (1921-1946) ====
Once it was clear that the mine would not reopen Elouera's inhabitants, amenities, and businesses departed rapidly. The school closed, in May 1921, followed by the post office, in December 1921. The Royal Hotel had closed by October 1922, and the Elouera Hotel also closed. By May 1923, reportedly, there was only one family left living in Elouera; the family of Robert Gardiner, the mine's accountant, may have been living there, at least as late as 1930. Elouera, under another name 'C.S.A. Mine', was abolished as a polling place in 1926. It is probable that, after around 1930, Elouera was deserted.

The C.S.A. Mine's closure was one of many that severely affected the Cobar area, in rapid succession; the two most significant others were the closure of the vast Great Cobar Mine, the town's main employer, in March 1919, and the unexpected closure of the large Occidental Gold Mine, at Wrightville, in July 1921. The closure of the Great Cobar and C.S.A. mines affected smaller copper mines that used the larger mines' smelters, causing those smaller mines to also close. As work for miners disappeared, buildings were removed, from Wrightville and Cobar, to be re-erected in more prosperous places, and the same probably happened at Elourera. In 1934, it was reported the disused railway line was to be repaired, so that equipment could be removed from the mine site.

The plant and buildings at Kandos were sold off in 1925; the timber from its large building was reused at the nearby cement plant, but its prominent concrete chimney stack would stand until the 1980s.

The fire in the C.S.A mine was reported to be still burning in 1935. The company kept the mine, and its furnaces, for many years. However, the circumstances were never appropriate to reopen it, during the years before the company began to be wound up in December 1946. Before then, around early 1942, the mine's equipment had been sold.

== Remnants ==
Although the old mine was dewatered and exploratory mining carried out, between 1951 and 1958, it was not until 1962-1963 that the C.S.A. reopened, with the modern mine in full production from 1965. The old railway to the mine was rehabilitated. The reopening of the C.S.A. mine sparked a revival in the fortunes of Cobar, but the old settlement of Elouera was only a memory by then. Its old site may have been used for temporary buildings and outdoor storage, during and after construction of the new mine.

A similar name 'Elura' was used for a new mine in the region, the Elura Mine and its railway line, opened in 1983, but this is far from Elouera's old site; it was later renamed the Endeavour Mine.

Nothing remains of the old mining settlement of Elouera, except for the map of its street plan, although the site of the town and its 'tank', or water supply, still can be discerned in aerial views. There may also be a lonely cemetery.

== See also ==
- Illewong
- Wrightville
