= Cobar railway station =

Preserved defunct Australian train station in Cobar

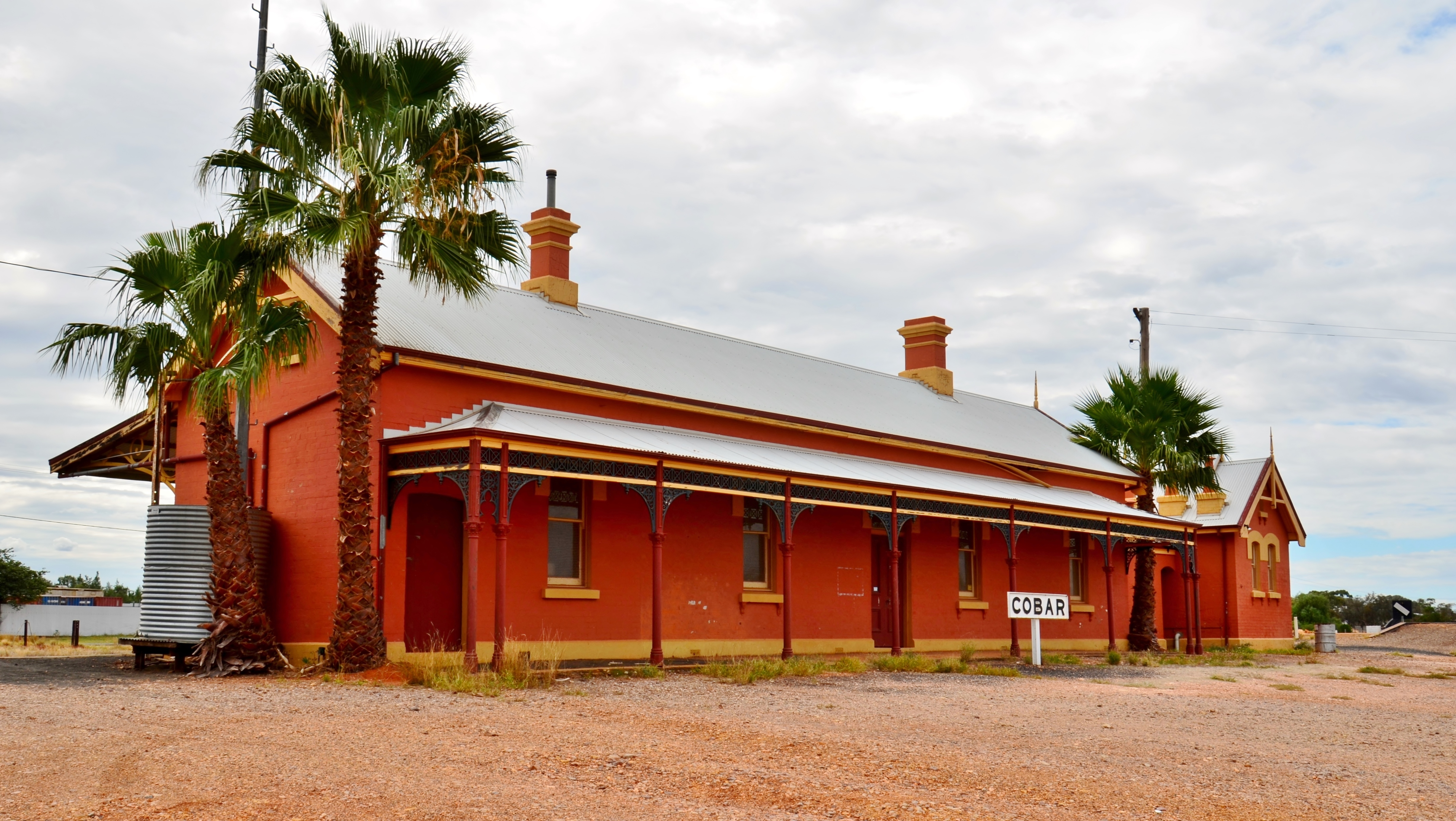

- Location within New South Wales Location within Australia
- 31.4921°S 145.8393°E
- Location: Cobar railway line, Cobar, Cobar Shire, New South Wales, Australia

Site notes
- Owner: Transport Asset Manager of New South Wales

New South Wales Heritage Register
- Official name: Cobar Railway Station and yard
- Type: state heritage (complex / group)
- Designated: 2 April 1999
- Reference no.: 1114
- Type: Railway Platform / Station
- Category: Transport – Rail

Cobar railway station is a heritage-listed disused railway station on the Cobar railway line at Cobar, in the Orana region of New South Wales, Australia. The property was added to the New South Wales State Heritage Register on 2 April 1999.

== History ==
Passenger services to the station ceased c. 1976.

== Description ==
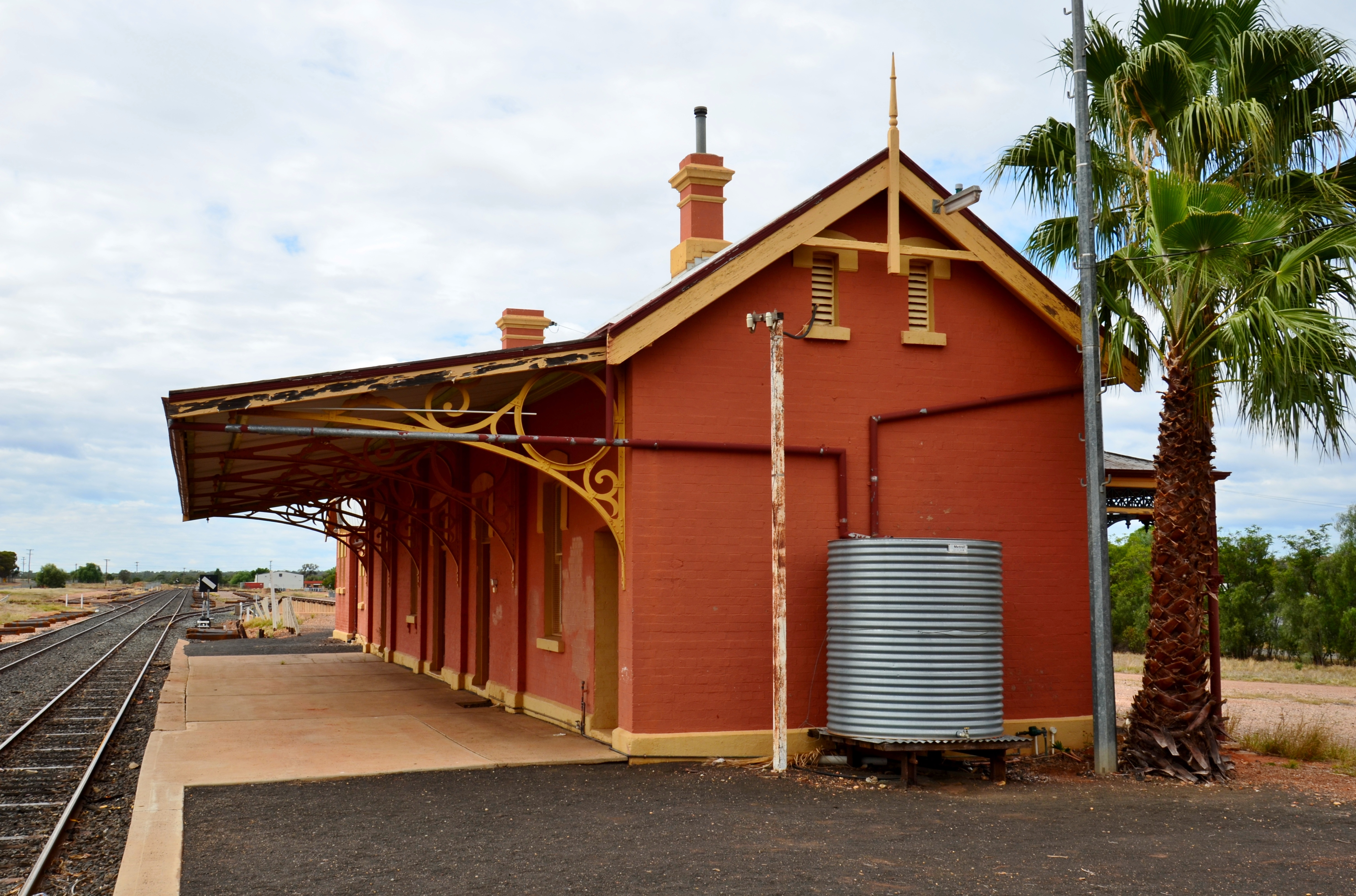
Platform

The heritage-listed complex consists of a brick station building of a type 4 standard roadside third class design with brackets and a timber faced platform, dating from 1892, the former railway barracks and a loading bank.

== Heritage listing ==
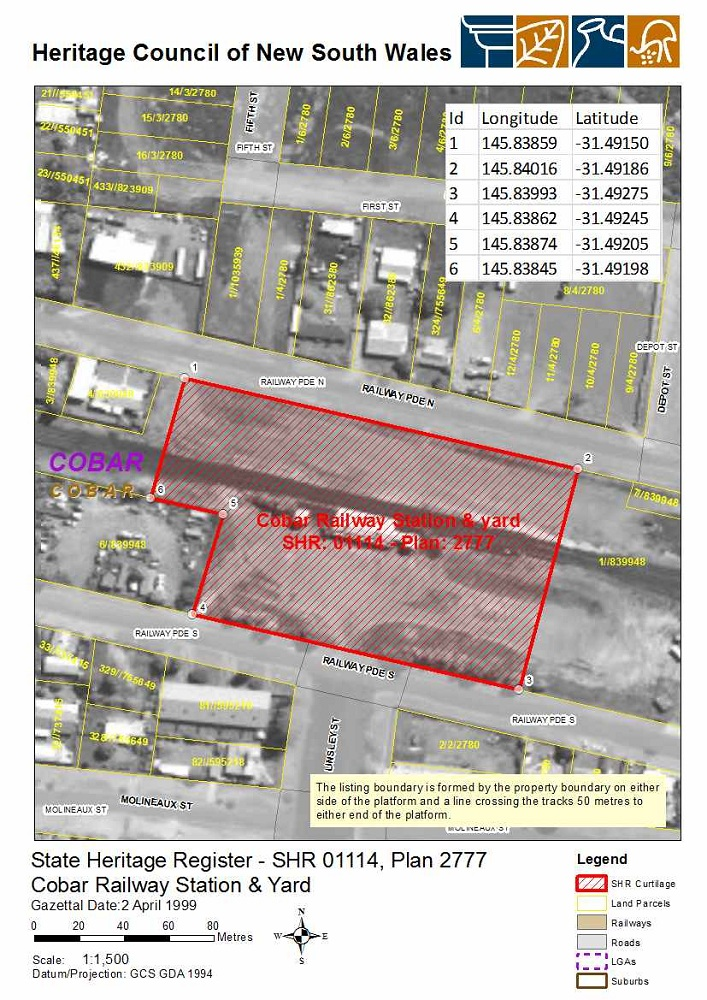
Heritage boundaries

Cobar station is an excellent station building from the peak period of railway construction at a remote location at the end of a branch line built to serve the mining activity in the area, a role still played today. The building represents the finest construction and detailing and is in excellent original condition. It is an important civic building in Cobar and an important element of the States railway history.

Cobar railway station and yard was listed on the New South Wales State Heritage Register on 2 April 1999 having satisfied the following criteria.

The place possesses uncommon, rare or endangered aspects of the cultural or natural history of New South Wales.

This item is assessed as historically rare. This item is assessed as arch. rare. This item is assessed as socially rare.
