= Cobar railway line =

Railway line in Australia

Cobar Line
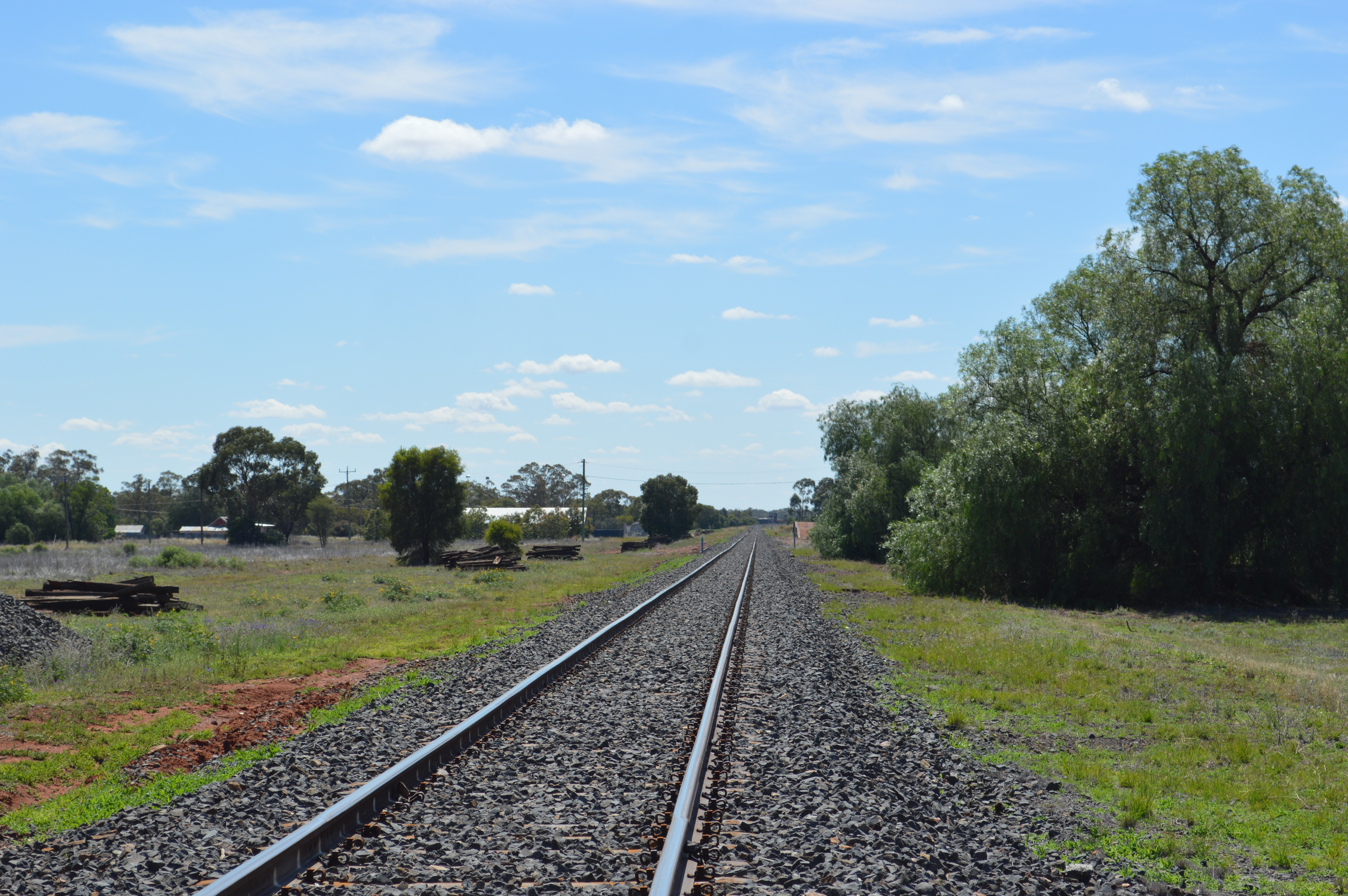
- The railway line through Hermidale.

Overview
- Status: Open (freight); Closed (passenger)
- Termini: Nyngan Junction; Cobar
- Stations: 10

Service
- Operator(s): Public Transport Commission

History
- Opened: 1 July 1892
- Closed: 22 September 1975 (passenger)

Technical
- Number of tracks: 1
- Track gauge: 4 ft 8 1/2 in (1,435 mm)

The Cobar railway line is a railway line in New South Wales, Australia. It branches west towards Cobar from the Main Western railway line at Nyngan. Main West passenger trains once continued northwest to Bourke but no longer run past Dubbo. However, copper concentrates from mines near Hermidale and Cobar are still railed on this line to ports on the New South Wales coast.

The Cobar line opened on 1 July 1892, and continues to carry wheat and ore. Passenger services ceased on 22 September 1975. Cobar railway station has been redeveloped into a community facility.

== History ==
The early development of Cobar was directly associated with the discovery of copper in the area. Aborigine guides showed a low hill, with outcrops of reddish oxide of ochre, to a party of tank-sinkers in 1870. These three men noticed that the rocks had been streaked green and blue. Samples collected were found to contain carbonate of copper. An area of 16.2ha was secured under a Mineral Conditional Purchase.

In the middle of 1871, two further blocks were secured and were known as the Great Cobar South and Great Cobar North mines. In January, 1876, the two southern mines were amalgamated under the name Great Cobar and the township of Cobar grew alongside the mine.

Probably the earliest move for a railway from Nyngan to Cobar was when a petition was presented to the N.S.W. Parliament on 27 August 1884, for the construction of a railway from Nyngan to Wilcannia via Cobar. Numerous deputations followed and on 8 October 1886, the construction of the line was approved by Parliament and formally assented to by the Governor on 11 November 1886.

From October 1901 to September 1931, there was a short branch railway, The Peak branch. It ran from Cobar to the Occidental Mine, via the now-vanished mining village of Wrightville. It reopened, in 1935, but was closed beyond to a siding in Cobar, in 1965. An extension of the line beyond Cobar to the C.S.A. Mine opened in January 1918. It too reopened in 1963, when the C.S.A. mine was revived. There is also a branch to the Endeavour Mine (formerly known as the Elura Mine).

== See also ==
- Rail transport in New South Wales
