= Wonawinta mine =

Silver mine in Australia

- Interactive map of Wonawinta mine
- Location: New South Wales, Australia; 32°14′11″S 145°44′22″E
- Products: silver

The Wonawinta mine is one of the largest silver mines in Australia and in the world. The mine is located in the south-east of the country, 80 km south of Cobar in New South Wales. The mine has estimated reserves of 50 million oz of silver. It is the only mine in Australia whose main focus is silver extraction.

In August 2014 the operating mine was put up for sale. It was acquired by Southern Cross Goldfields Ltd. There was some public concerns aired over the manner in which the sale was concluded.
