= Mount Grenfell =

Coordinates: 31°18′04″S 145°18′34″E

Mount Grenfell Historic Site is an Aboriginal rock art site, about 70 kilometres northwest of Cobar along the Barrier Highway in the arid lands in central west New South Wales, Australia. Travel 40km on the highway and you’ll see the turn off to Mount Grenfell. Go about 30km’s down the gravel road to the entrance. The road is easy to travel though has no lane markings. The last 1km is currently a dirt road and not recommended for caravans.

It is a spiritually important place for its Aboriginal owners, the Ngiyampaa Wangaaypuwan people. Hundreds of ancient rock drawings of humans, animals and the natural environment are present at the site.

On 17 July 2004, the site was handed back by the Australian government to the Ngiyampaa Wangaaypuwan people, but is leased back to the NSW government.

Animals found at the site include emus, kangaroos, bearded dragons, geckos, and kultarrs.
