= CSA Mine =

Copper mine in New South Wales, Australia

- Interactive map of CSA Mine
- Location: Cobar, New South Wales, Australia; 31.408°S 145.801°E
- Products: Copper
- Opened: 8 October 1966
- Company: Metals Acquisition
- Website: www.metalsacquisition.com

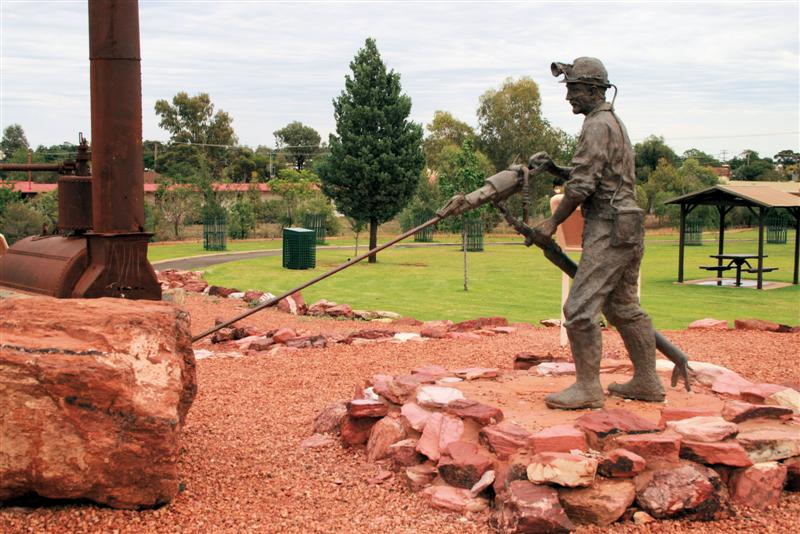
Miner Statue in Cobar, New South Wales

The CSA Mine is a copper mine located near Cobar, New South Wales, owned by Metals Acquisition.

== History ==
=== Earlier mining ===
Ore deposits at the CSA Mine—Cornish, Scottish and Australian Mine—were mined at various times between 1872 and 1921, when the mine closed as a result of an underground fire. The most significant years of operation during this period were from 1906 onward. From around 1906 to around 1930, there was a nearby mining settlement known as Elouera.

=== Current mine ===
In 1962, Broken Hill South began work on reopening the CSA Mine near Cobar. The first ore was produced in 1964. The mine was reopened officially, on 8 October 1966.

In 1980, the mine was acquired by CRA. In 1993, it was sold to Golden Shamrock Mines. In 1996, Golden Shamrock Mines was taken over by Ashanti Gold.

In 1997, the mine was placed in receivership and in January 1998 placed in care and maintenance. In 1999, Glencore acquired CSA Mine and restarted operations. In June 2023 it was sold to Metals Acquisition. The mine's life has been extended until 2034.
