= Mount Boppy Gold Mine =

Gold mine in New South Wales, Australia

Coordinates: 31°33′30.1″S 146°18′57.8″E

Mount Boppy Gold Mine was a gold mine at Canbelego, New South Wales, Australia. The original Mount Boppy Gold Mine operated from 1901 to 1922. It was, at the time, regarded as being the largest gold producer in New South Wales.

The gold-bearing deposit that became the Mount Boppy Gold Mine was discovered, in September 1896. The discoverer of the gold-bearing lode, a prospector, Michael Delaney O'Grady, lived near the then Mount Boppy railway station, on the Cobar railway line. It was while walking back to his home, in September 1896, that he recognised the lode, where it was exposed in a watercourse. He and his partner, Thomas Reid, had been trying to find the source of a 'floater' rock that had been found on the Nyngan-Cobar road. After a sample was dollyed by Reid, it was found to be rich in gold.

The lode initially was worked by O'Grady and Reid, under a mining claim known as 'Hidden Treasure'. In November 1897, the claim, and another 10 acres of mining claim land owned by other prospectors, were sold to the Anglo-Australian Exploration Company, for £1,000.

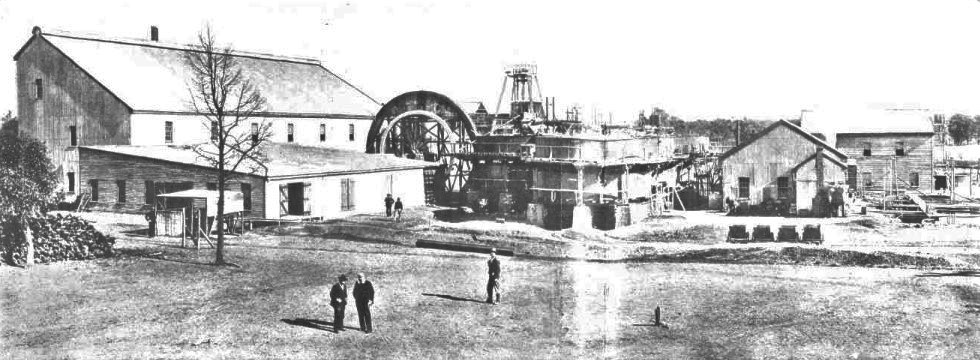
General view of the Mt Boppy Gold Mine - Surface plant (c.1905). The circular structure is a Raff wheel, used to elevate the tailings from the battery, into flumes to the cyanide vats.

The new owners sank four shafts, and identified a huge gold-bearing lode, over 1,000 feet long to a depth of at least 200 feet; later mining would reach 300 feet deep, in 1902, 400 feet in 1904, 500 feet in 1909, and 800 feet, in 1911. The gold-bearing quartz reef varied in thickness, from 12 feet up to 37 feet. A 200-ton bulk sample, averaged slightly over 16 pennyweights (0.8 troy ounces) to the ton. In 1900, the Mount Boppy Gold-Mining Company was formed, in London, to exploit the newly-proven, large, rich deposit. By July 1900, work on establishing the mine was well under way.

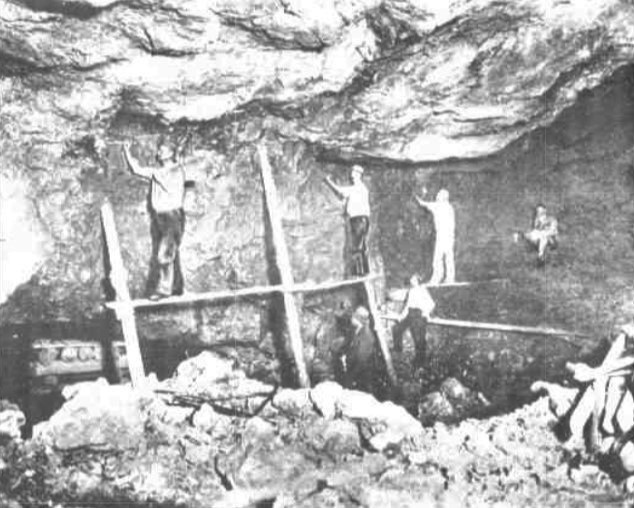
Mt Boppy Gold Mine - Underground workings (c.1905)

The mining village of Canbelego grew to the east of the mine's site. In 1905, the population had been around 1,500, with around 300 of these being employees of the mine. Between 1907 and 1917, the population was around 2,000.

In charge of operations was the mine's Superintendent. The first Superintendent, until his death in 1902, was S.W Vale, formerly of the Gibraltar Mine, followed by Thomas White. From 1904 to 1908, the Superintendent, was Thomas Pascoe, who was succeeded by the longest-serving of the Superintendents, James Negus. The Superintendent was the de facto mayor of the mining village, essentially a company town, which would not have local government until 1958.

When James Negus arrived, from London, the mine had only about two years of ore in sight. He brought with him the management services of mining engineers, John Taylor & Sons, to further develop the mine. More rich ore was discovered, in early 1909, a new main shaft was sunk, and work commenced on extending the existing main shaft to the 600 foot level.

For its time, the Mount Boppy Gold Mine was a sophisticated and well run operation, with its own assaying laboratory, and was an early adopter of the cyanide process. Below 240 feet, the lode transitioned from an oxide zone to a sulphide zone. The surface plant needed to be capable of treating both kinds of ore, especially as the mining went deeper. The company was able to reuse some equipment obtained from other mines. The company's huge 60-head stamper battery was divided so that the oxide zone ore was pulverised by 20-heads and the sulphide zone ore by the remaining 40-heads.

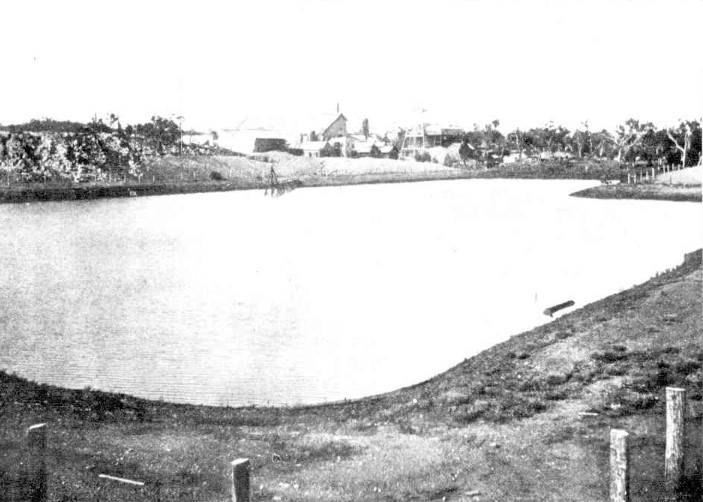
Water supply 'tank' for the mine, c.1905

Water was precious in the semi-arid environment, with enormous amounts being needed for the processing operations. The mine had a 13 million gallon dam (known as a 'tank'), condensed the exhaust steam from its steam engines for return to the boilers, and distilled brackish mine water. So critical was the mine to the village's economy that, if the mine's tank fell below eight feet in depth and subject to approval, water was transferred from the Government Tank—the village's water supply—to the mine's tank. From 1914, the mine began using groundwater, from the abandoned North Mount Boppy shaft, in its boilers. In the early 1920s, the area was subject to a long drought, which affected mining operations at the Mt Boppy mine.

Although not unusually so for the time, working conditions at the mine were difficult—by modern standards, physically demanding and unsafe—and there were many accidents and fatalities. The mining company provided Canbelego with a small hospital, capable of basic care, but more serious injuries needed to be transferred to Cobar, typically by train. Even once at Cobar District Hospital, seriously injured miners usually died.

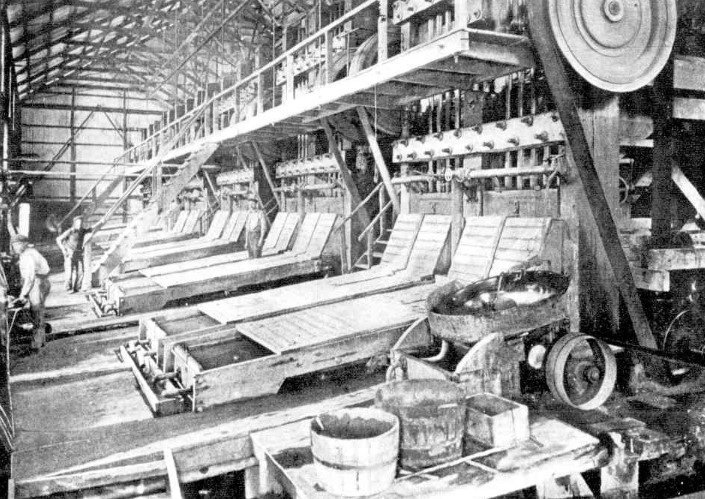
Mount Boppy Gold Mine - 60-head stamper battery c.1905

The original Mount Boppy Gold Mine operated from 1901 to 1922, with an approximately twelve month interruption of mining, to sink a new shaft, during 1917. It was, at the time, regarded as being the largest gold producer in New South Wales. Over that period, the mine produced 13.5 tons (433,000 ounces) of gold.

Already, by the end of 1905, shareholders had received a 133% return. In the four years to 1909, the dividend paid to shareholders was 50%, falling to a still remarkably high 27% in 1910. By the end of 1912, shareholders had received a return of 356% on their capital investment, rising to 500% over the entire 21 years of operation. After reef mining ceased on 6 September 1921, the old company reprocessed tailings, until finally closing the site and selling off its equipment and buildings in 1923.

Between 1929 and 1941, there was minor production of gold from remnant ore and attempts to process tailings. Around 500,000 tonnes of tailings—still containing an average of 3g of gold per tonne—were left on the surface. Starting in 1974, these tailings were reprocessed to recover more gold. Later mining operations included reprocessing of tailings sand that had been used to back fill the old underground workings. The operation used the carbon-in-pulp process. In recent years, the mine was reopened as an open-cut operation, but later placed under care and maintenance.

It is estimated that over its entire life, from hard-rock mining and tailings reprocessing, the mine has produced 500,000 ounces of gold. Only with the opening of the New Occidental mine at Wrightville, near Cobar, in the 1930s, did the Mount Boppy mine lose its place as the most productive gold mine in New South Wales. Paradoxically, it had been the company's decision not to exercise an option that it held over the Occidental Mine, in mid 1922, which had left the Mount Boppy Gold-Mining Company, despite its attempts to identify others, without suitable future gold-mining prospects.

In 2020, drilling revealed intersections of high-grade gold-bearing ore below the bottom of the existing pit. Gold was again being mined there in 2021, and that was expected to continue, until 2022, together with limited mine site rehabilitation. In May 2024, Manuka Resources announced that it had raised $8 million in capital to commence production at the Mount Boppy mine.
