= Canbelego =

- Town
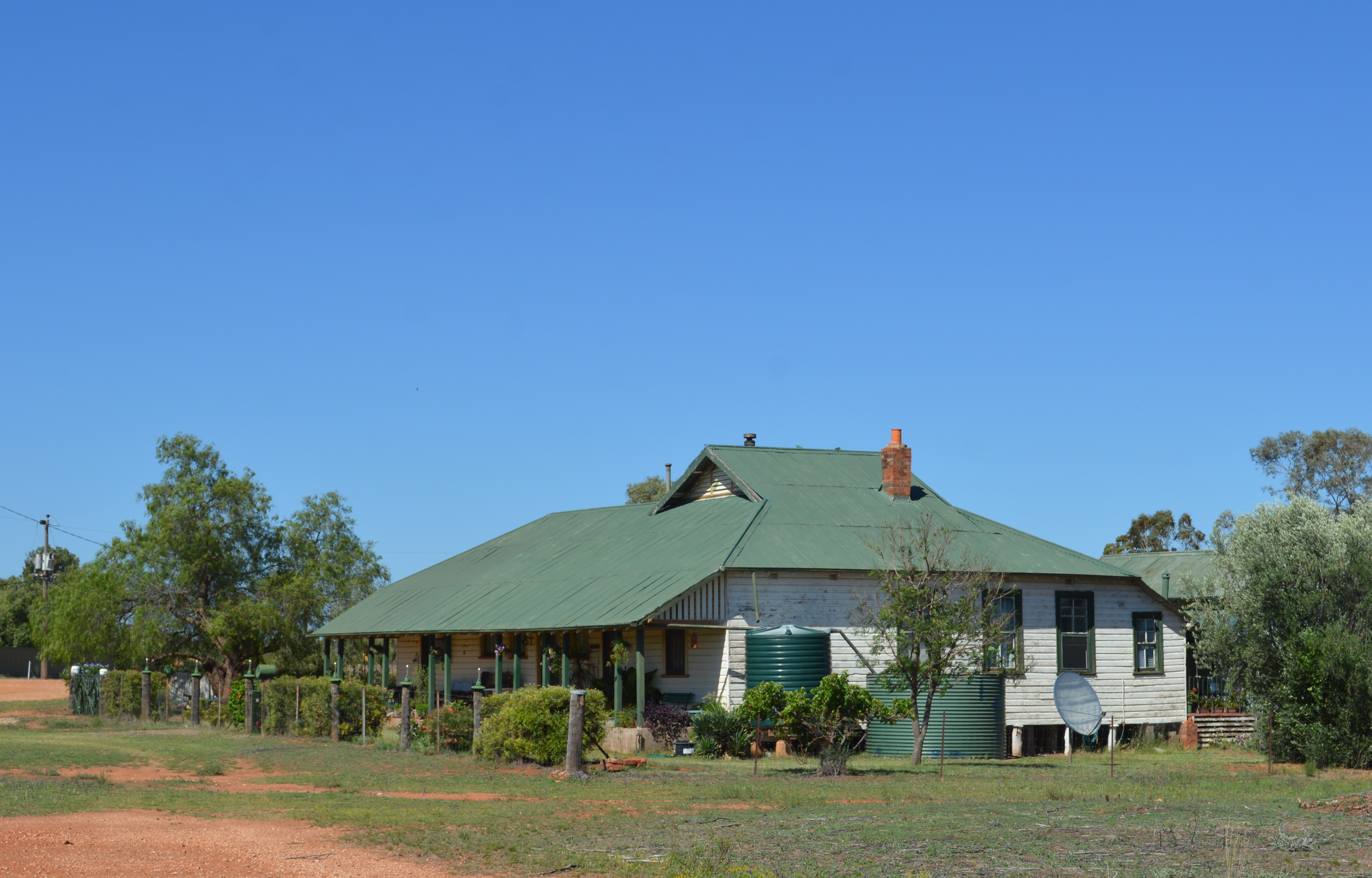
- A house at Canbelego that dates from its days as a gold mining village. (Taken in 2017.)

- Interactive map of Canbelego
- Coordinates: 31°33′24″S 146°19′11″E
- Country: Australia
- State: New South Wales
- Region: Orana
- LGA: Cobar Shire
- Location: 48 km (30 mi) E of Cobar; 86 km (53 mi) W of Nyngan; 640 km (400 mi) NW of Sydney

Government
  - State electorate: Barwon
  - Federal division: Parkes

Population
  - Total: 54 (2021 census)
- Postcode: 2835
- County: Robinson, Canbelego
- Parish: Cohn, Florida

Canbelego is a village in the Orana region of New South Wales, Australia. It is now virtually a ghost town but was once a much larger settlement associated with the Mount Boppy Gold Mine. The name (pronounced can-bell-ee-go) also refers to the surrounding rural locality identified for postal and statistical purposes. At the 2021 census, the population of Canbelego, including its surrounding area, was 54, up from 39 in 2016, but the village itself had only four residents in early 2020. Between 1907 and 1917, the population was around 2,000.

== Location ==
It is located approximately 640 km north-west of Sydney, 50 km east of Cobar and 5 km south of the nearest point on the Barrier Highway.

== History ==
=== Aboriginal and early settler history ===
The area now known as Canbelego is part of the traditional lands of Wangaaypuwan dialect speakers (also known as Wangaibon) of Ngiyampaa people.

The Surveyor-General Thomas Mitchell and his expedition had camped and obtained water, in early 1845, at a place that he called "Canbelego" but that was not the later site of the village; it was a location—on Bogan River, near to the modern-day locality of Grahweed—about 30 km from Nyngan. As Mitchell tried to use local language names whenever possible, it is likely that the name Canbelego is derived from the local aboriginal dialect. Grahweed and the later site of Canbelego lie at opposite ends of area of the County of Canbelego, and it is likely that the village took its name from the county.

After settler colonisation, the area of the village was partly within Robinson County (Parish of Cohn) and partly within Canbelego County (Parish of Florida). Settlers grazed sheep in the area from, at latest, the 1870s, but the productivity of wool-growing was dramatically impacted, when feral rabbits arrived in the Cobar region, around 1890.

=== Mount Boppy Gold Mine ===
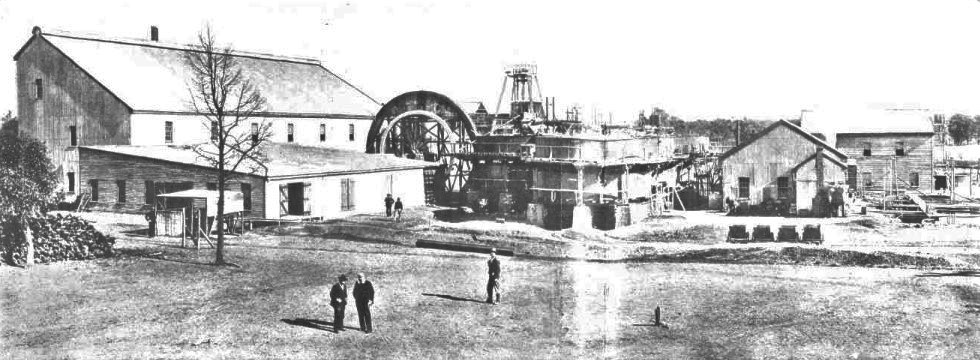
General view of the Mt Boppy Gold Mine - Surface plant (c.1905).

The original Mount Boppy Gold Mine operated from 1901 to 1922. It was, at the time, regarded as being the largest gold producer in New South Wales. Over that period, the mine produced 13.5 tons (433,000 ounces) of gold. By the end of 1912, shareholders had received a return of 356% on their capital investment, rising to 500% over the entire 21 years of operation.

After reef mining ceased in September 1921, the old company reprocessed tailings and remnant ore stocks, until finally closing the site and selling off equipment, in 1923.

Between 1929 and 1941, there was minor production of gold from remnant ore and attempts to process tailings. Around 500,000 tonnes of tailings—still containing an average of 3g of gold per tonne—were left on the surface. Starting in 1974, these tailings were reprocessed to recover more gold. Later mining operations included reprocessing of tailings sand that had been used to back fill the old underground workings. In recent years, the mine was reopened as an open-cut operation, but later placed under care and maintenance.

It is estimated that over its entire life, from hard-rock mining and tailings reprocessing, the mine has produced 500,000 ounces of gold. Only with the opening of the New Occidental mine at Wrightville, near Cobar, in the 1930s, did the Mount Boppy mine lose its place as the most productive gold mine in New South Wales. In 2020, drilling revealed intersections of high-grade gold-bearing ore below the bottom of the existing pit. Gold was again being mined there in 2021, and that was expected to continue, until 2022, with limited mine site rehabilitation. In May 2024, Manuka Resources announced that it had raised $8 million in capital to commence production at the Mount Boppy mine.

=== Other mines ===
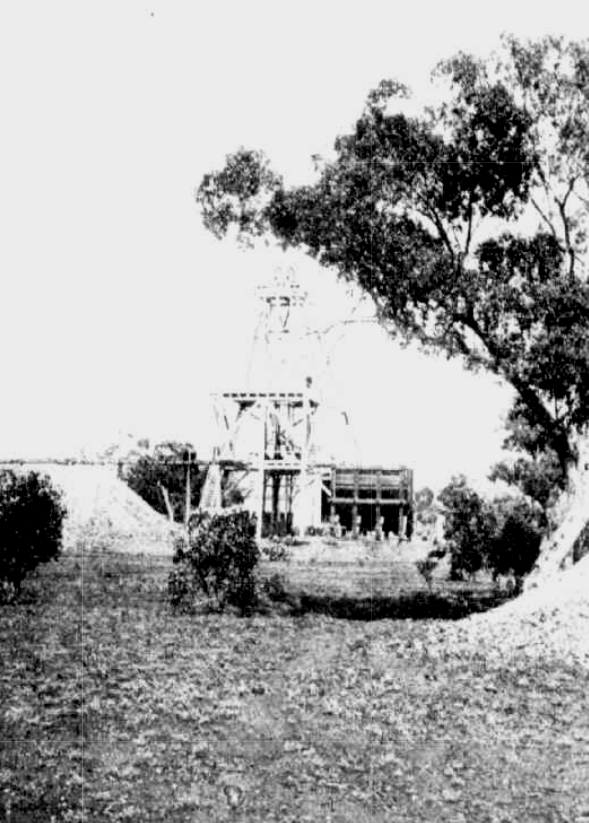
Mount Boppy South mine (1912)

South-east of the Mount Boppy mine was the Mount Boppy South mine, which was worked in conjunction with the main Mount Boppy Gold Mine. Other nearby mines included the Canbelego Copper Mining Co. (also known as 'the Burra' or Mount Boppy Copper Mine), located 5 miles south of the village, which was operating between 1886 and 1916, the North Mount Boppy Gold Mining Co., and the Restdown Copper Mining Co. (15 miles south-east of Canbelego). Nearer to the railway station at Boppy Mountain was the Boppy Boulder Gold Mine. Around 7 km west of Canbelego, lay the site of the Boppy Broken Hill mine (also known as the Black Range mine), a copper mine.

The deposit that was formerly associated with the Canbelego Copper Mining Co. and later Canbelego Copper Mines Limited—mined between 1906 and 1914—was once again, in 2022, the focus of exploration as a copper resource.

=== Mining village ===
==== Growth ====
The village of Canbelego was proclaimed in December 1902, although the emerging settlement— at first informally known as Mount Boppy Mine—had been surveyed and named Canbelego, by late 1900. In May 1901, the population was 184. By the end of 1902, there was already a population of 300 to 400, and two hotels. By mid 1904, the rapidly growing population had reached around 900, with 180 employed at the Mt Boppy Mine.

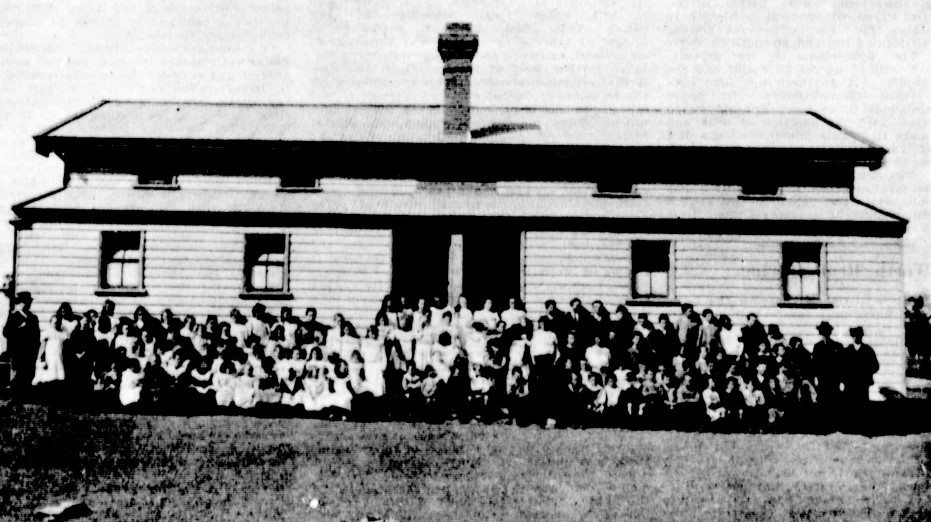
Canbelego Public School c. 1904.

The post office opened as a receiving office, under the name Mount Boppy Mine, in September 1900. Around October 1900, the mail service between the railway station at Boppy Mountain and the new receiving office was increased, from daily to twice daily, allowing replies to be sent to Cobar on the same day. The receiving office was renamed, Canbelego, from New Year's Day 1901. It became a full post office, in July 1901.

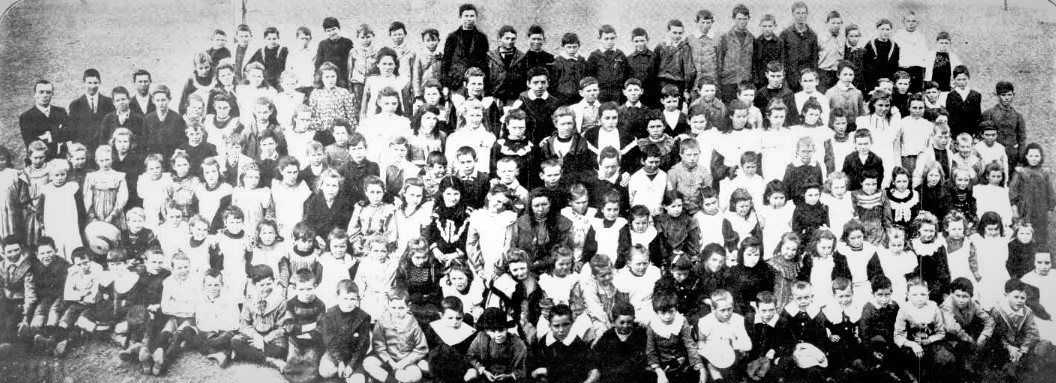
Canbelego Public School pupils, July 1905

The public school was established in 1901, initially with around 35 children; by mid 1904, it had an enrolment of 158, and an average attendance of 120. The main street, Edward Street, had three hotels, six stores, two butchers, a baker, blacksmith, billiard saloon, cool drink shops, many boarding houses, a post office, and a court house under construction. There was also a local doctor. The first of its church buildings, the Presbyterian Church, built in 1901, was shared when necessary with other denominations, pending the other churches being built. All the houses in the town were neat houses of weatherboard construction, not the temporary structures common in mining towns of that time. On the outskirts of the village, a sawmill was busy cutting timber for building work in the growing village.

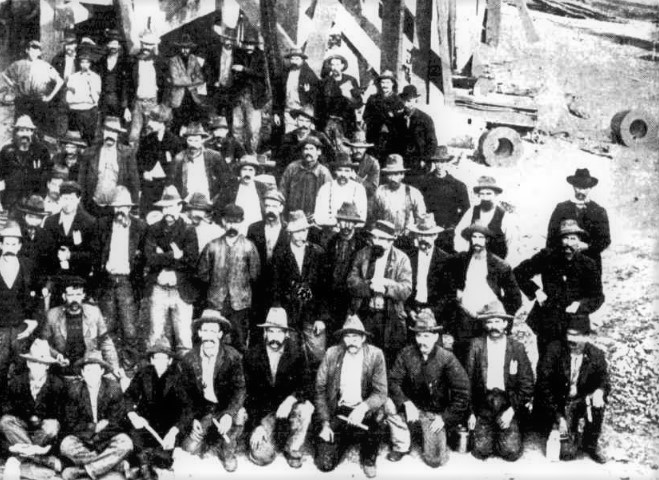
Miners who were starting their shift at the Mount Boppy Gold Mine (c. 1905)

In 1905, the population reached around 1,500, with around 300 of these being employees of the mine. By 1907, the population had reached around 2,000.

A fourth hotel, the Federal Hotel had opened by late 1908.

Construction of an Anglican church (The Church of the Good Shepherd) began in late 1908, and it was consecrated in mid 1909. Anglican church services were conducted by visiting priests of the Brotherhood of the Good Shepherd.

By 1908, the village had a Catholic church (St Phillip's). In 1908, a second school, a Catholic Convent School, was opened, with four Sisters of St. Joseph and 70 pupils, and by 1916 it had 135.

In 1910, the village's new Methodist church was opened. The new building was necessary because the Methodists could no longer use the building of 'a sister church' (probably the Presbyterian church) for their services.

==== Businesses ====
In 1908, Michael Lane, a storekeeper from Nymagee, bought land in Edward Street, for a general store that was to be a part of Canbelego until the early 1920s. His first store, located directly opposite the Commercial Hotel, was burned down, in 1911, but he bought the premises of another business and re-established his store there, January 1912.

Wong Sing Wah, who operated a market garden, on the Nyngan Road, just outside Cobar, had a fruiterer and greengrocer's shop, in Edward Street. Also in Edward St, a Syrian, Joseph Shalala, operated a shop selling drapery, clothing, boots and ironmongery, for around six years before 1914. Robert Linton ran a soft drink business in the village.

Charles Wall came to the village to assist his brother in a general store. He later set up a bakery, then a sweets and cool drinks shop, finally establishing a permanent motion picture show in 1914. He sold up and left the village in 1921. His partner in the cinema venture was Maurice Levy, who also had business interests in Nymagee, another mining village 61 km due south of Canbelego.

The main business of the village were its hotels: the Commercial Hotel, the Miner's Arms, the Federal Hotel, and the Royal Hotel.

==== Entertainment, recreation, and sports ====
By 1908, there were four hotels, to slake the thirst of miners, but there were also other recreation choices.

From around 1906, the village had its own horse racing course and race meetings were held there on New Year's Day until the racing club was wound up in 1912. A 'patriotic meeting' of the Canbelego Race Club was held at a new race course at Canbelego, in May 1916, and the tradition of races on New Year's Day revived for 1917, with an Easter Monday race meeting in 1918.

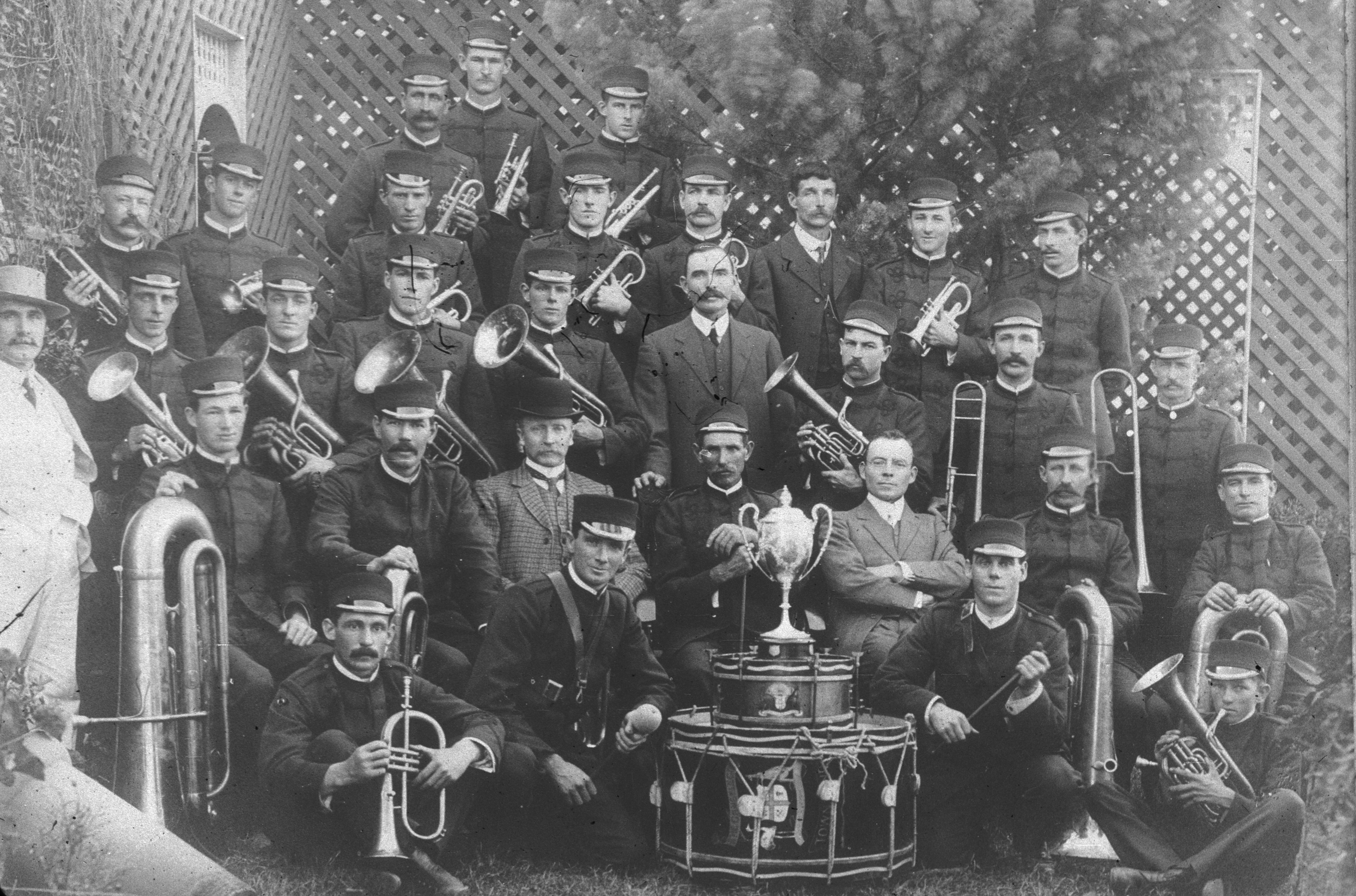
Canbelego Town Band, in Ballarat, Victoria (c.1908)

The village had a cricket club, from September 1904, playing games against Cobar and Wrightville. The games were typically limited to one innings for each side, to allow visiting sides to catch the afternoon train home. Home games were played on a ground known as Canbelego Park. There was also a football club, also playing at Canbelego Park. Initially, the football code played was Rugby Union. A team from Orange, visited in September 1916, being given a warm welcome. "The field was in a very bad state, being as hard as a rock", leaving both teams' players with many cuts and bruises. By around that time, the football code had changed to Rugby League.

The Canbelego Town Band, performed at a second annual fancy dress and masquerade ball, in 1907. It competed in music competitions against other towns.

A travelling cinema 'Phelan's electric biograph' visited and entertained the village over two nights in August 1907. The village had its own venue for motion pictures, Levy and Wall's Picture Show, where a motion picture cinema was established and operated, by a local businessman, Charles Wall, from 1914 to around 1921.

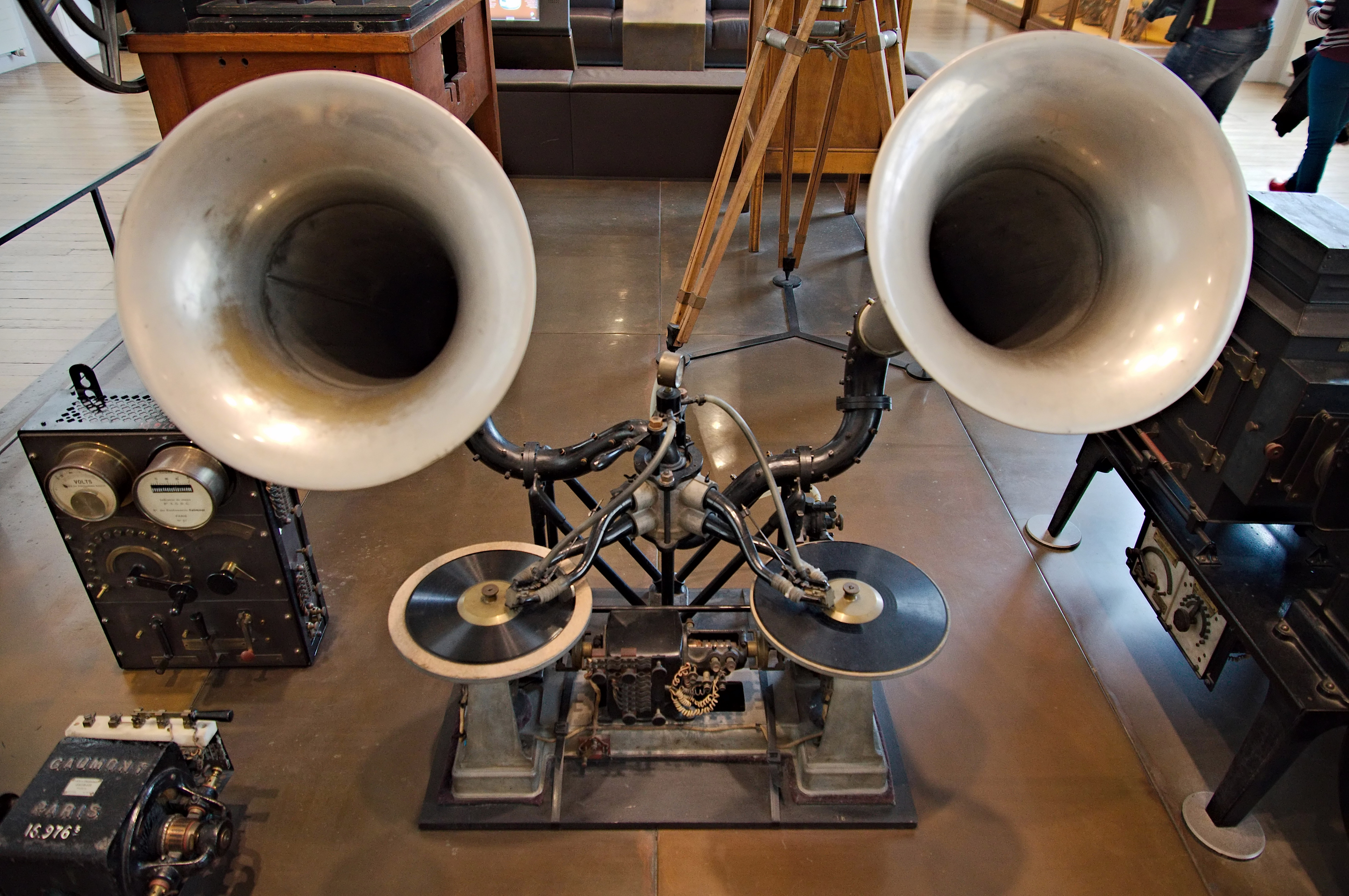
Audio section of a Chronophone.

On 27 October 1911, the village was entertained by a touring 'Bio-megaphone', an early form of talking motion picture show. It was powered by "huge electric generator imported from America expressly for this tour", and was fitted with "Fire-proof guards to prevent any danger of conflagration". Probably, it was either a Chronophone or a Chonomegaphone (an enhanced version of the Chronophone). Both electrically powered devices were made by Lèon Gaumont, played Phonoscènes, and amplified the sound using compressed air; both kinds of device had been in use elsewhere in Australia by 1911. Most likely, the 'Bio-megaphone' was a Chronophone that had been improved by using a later model film projector, then rebranded, for marketing purposes, to compete with the more modern Chronomegaphone (both the 'Bio-megaphone' and Chronomegaphone began showing, on the same day, in two different Melbourne theatres). Phonoscènes were typically the duration of one gramophone record, including only one song, but longer sound-on-disc films were made of operas.

==== Difficulties ====
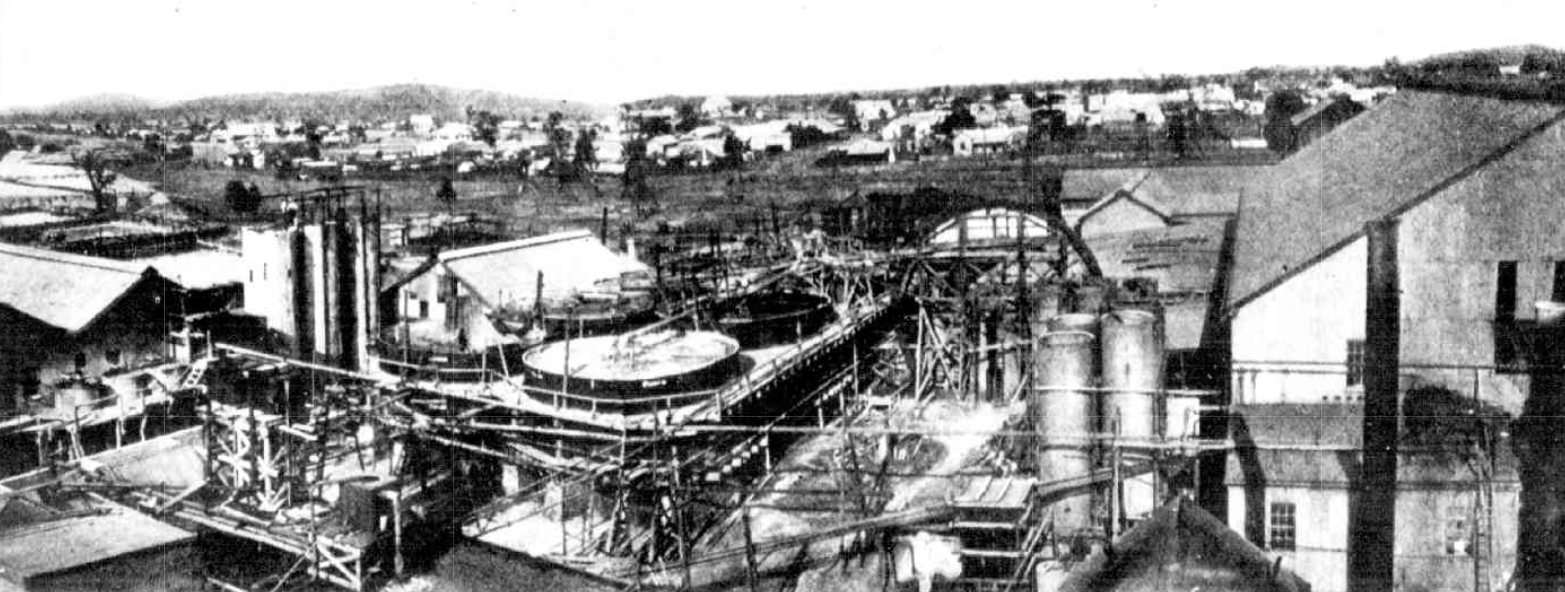
View from poppet head of Mount Boppy Gold Mine, with Canbelego in the background, c.1912.

The rapid growth in population soon exposed the vulnerable water supply—a continuing problem in a semi-arid area—overcrowding at the school, and inadequate postal and telegraph arrangements. The village would suffer an extraordinary number of building fires.

===== Water and drought =====
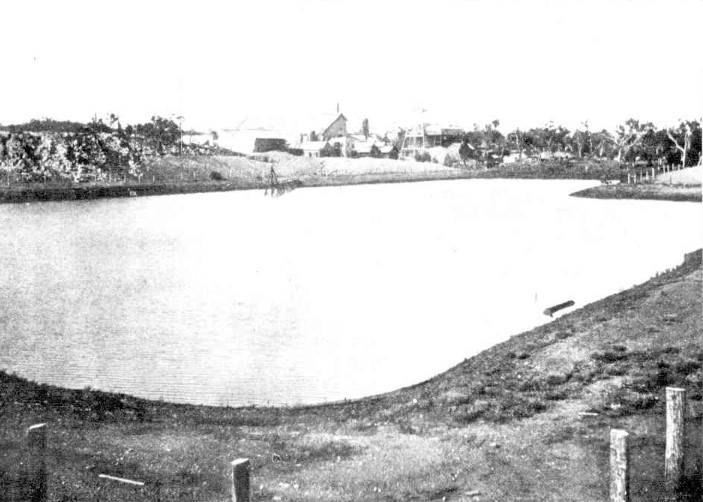
Water supply 'tank' at the Mount Boppy Gold Mine c.1905

Water was critical, in the semi-arid environment. Canbelego's mean annual rainfall is just under 400mm, but it can vary greatly from year to year, with drought an ever present risk. All watercourses in the area are ephemeral.

Enormous amounts of water were needed for the gold processing operations. The mine drew its water from a vast 'tank'. Despite the mine tank's 12-million imperial gallon capacity—enough for eight months operation if full—and very careful water management at the mine, lack of water was a cause of interruptions to production and employment, during droughts. Paradoxically, infrequent but heavy rain could also interrupt mine operations, if water found its way into the mine, as occurred twice in 1913.

The village's water came from a separate 'Government Tank'. So critical was the mine to the village's economy that, if the mine's tank fell below eight feet in depth and subject to approval, water was transferred from the Government Tank to the mine's tank. From 1914, the mine began using groundwater, from the abandoned North Mount Boppy shaft, in its boilers.

The quality of the village's water supply was poor; on at least one occasion, the water from the 'Government Tank' was declared unsafe to drink, by the Government Analyst. It often contained silt, and water needed to be boiled to be safe to drink. Distribution of water to the town depended upon there being enough wind to operate the windmill-driven pump feeding a distribution tank. Keeping livestock away from the village's water supply, particularly goats that thrived in the semi-arid climate, was a constant problem.

Some houses and commercial premises had rainwater tanks, but these could not be relied upon in Canbelego's climate. Groundwater from the mine workings was clean, but brackish and unfit for human consumption. In times of drought, residents sometimes needed to buy water that had to be brought in by rail. In 1911, water was brought in by rail, but there was only enough to supply the village, and the mine shutdown temporarily.

Drought even caused difficulty for the musicians of the town's band. During dust storms, they could not play, with their instruments needing to be carefully packed away to avoid damage. After the long drought of 1911 interrupted production at the Mount Boppy mine, ten of the 28 bandsmen left town, bringing to an end the heyday of the band.

===== Fires =====
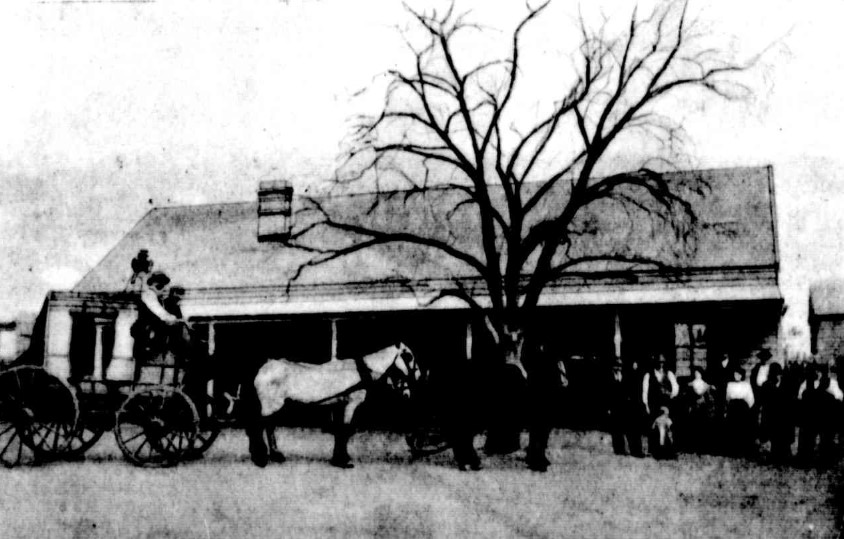
Royal Hotel c.1904. It was one of nine buildings destroyed in the catastrophic fire of February 1915. Its owners were about to sell it to a new owner. It was not rebuilt. After the fire, Canbelego had just two hotels, until the Federal Hotel, also destroyed in the same fire, was rebuilt.

With little water and no fire brigade, fire was a constant threat to a village built mainly of wood and corrugated iron sheets. There were serious fires that destroyed multiple commercial buildings, in 1904, 1906, January 1911, October 1911, November 1911, 1913, and 1915, as well as house fires that destroyed individual residences. In 1915, a fire at the hospital was extinguished before it could destroy the building.

The most destructive fire was the fire of February 1915; it destroyed two of the village's hotels and seven shops, all in Edward Street. Only with great effort, by surface staff from the mine, was the fire prevented from spreading to the other side of the street. The fire of November 1911 had been nearly as destructive; it consumed eight buildings, mostly shops.

After more fires affecting hotels and businesses, a skeptical reporter opined in early 1916 that, "Fires seem to be quite fashionable in Canbelego at present". Arson was involved in some fires, but in others, including the destructive fire of February 1915, it was not possible to reach a conclusion on whether there had been arson or not. The fire risk at Canbelego, in general, was such that insurance cover had become harder to obtain by 1912.

===== Company town =====
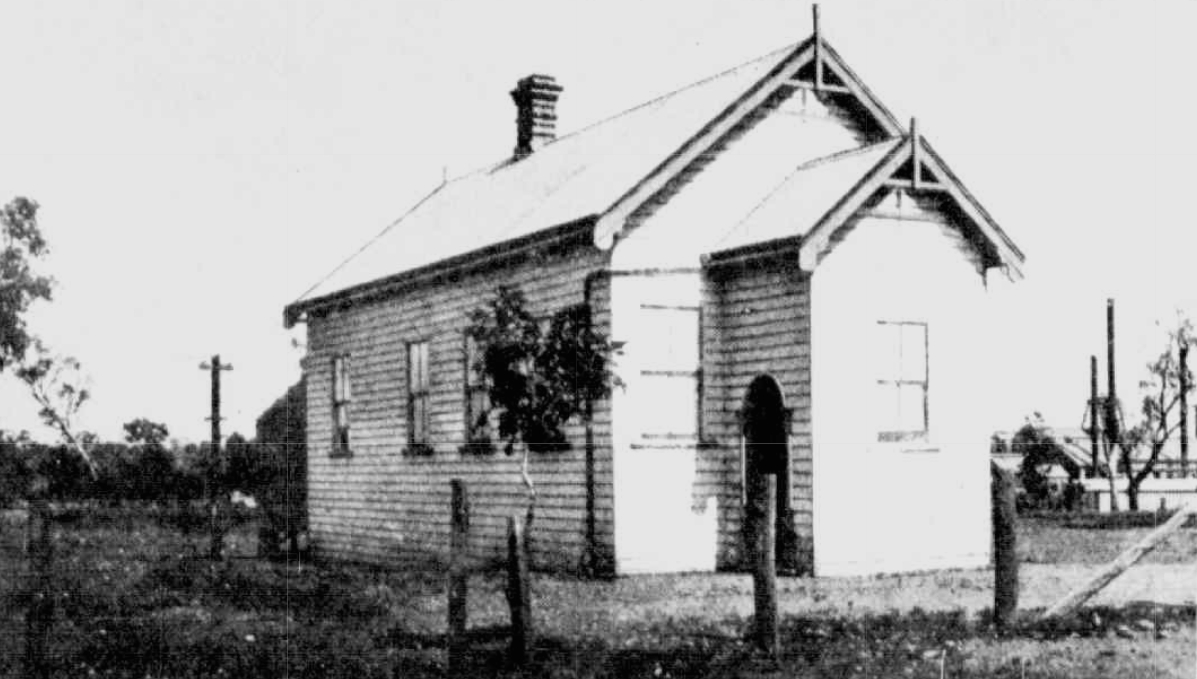
Library and reading room, 1912.

Canbelego did not have local government, before 1958, and lay within the Unincorporated Western Division; it was in many ways a company town. That had advantages; the mine employed a doctor, who was also allowed to have a private practice in the village; the company provided a small hospital, in 1908, and a library—known as Mount Boppy Miners' Library—in 1907; and the village's electricity supply originally came from the mine. The surface employees of the mine also fought fires in the village. However, not just the village's economy was dependent upon the mine, but most services too. Another disadvantage was that, without local government, the village could only rely on its Progress Committee, or the management of the mine, for advocacy to the New South Wales state government and its departments.

===== Cost of living, wages, and working conditions =====
A typical miner's family bills per fortnightly pay period, in 1906, was 12 shillings for meat, for "groceries and a little drapery", £2 12s 7¼d, and for fruit and vegetables 10s 10¼d.

The distance from the coast and larger settlements, and rail freight cost, resulted in a premium on the price of food and household items at Canbelego, relative to Sydney prices. Evidence given in December 1905, showed that this premium was between 6% for clothing and 23% for eggs. Kerosene cost 33% to 50% more at Canbelego. Some fruits and vegetables were grown locally, at Cobar, in market gardens that were tended by ethnic Chinese, and the produce was sold in Canbelego. Livestock was raised in the Cobar region, but reportedly local butchers sometimes had difficulty accessing enough animals to slaughter.

A miner told how his (presumably single) board and accommodation at Canbelego was 17s 6d, per week, much higher than the 12s 6d that he had paid while working near the coast at Pambula. A local agent gave evidence that the minimum weekly rental on a house suited to a family was 7s 6d per week, whereas a better house, with a bathroom, could cost 10s 6d. In nearby Cobar, miners contributed 9d each per week to retain a medical practitioner.

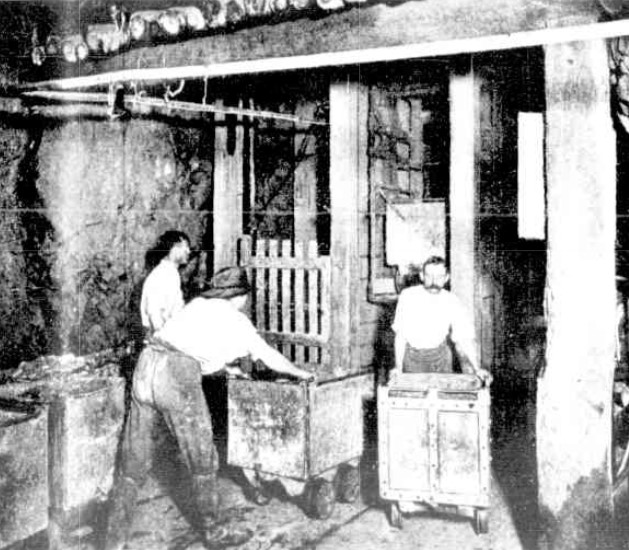
Mine workers, known as 'platmen', in the flat area of an underground level adjacent to the main shaft, which was known as a 'plat'. They are manhandling skips, into and out of a skip cage inside the main shaft (Mount Boppy Mine, 1905). At the surface, a similar task was done by workers known as 'bracemen'.

Evidence given, in December 1905, was that wages for mine workers were typically between 7 and 9 shillings per eight-hour shift, and that workers mainly worked six shifts per week—although at least some were working seven—becoming a typical fortnightly wage of £4 4s to £5 8s. The fortnightly wage of a miner was roughly equivalent to the price of an ounce of gold.

In June 1911, the Mount Boppy company agreed to give preference to union members, when employing new workers, which had been an objective of the unionists. Wages for mine workers had increased to between 9s and 11s 6d, per shift, depending upon their classification and, for some, the conditions where they were working. At the time, union members paid to their union 2s 9d, on joining, and 9d per fortnight for the union's working expenses.

There were no rock-drilling machines at the Mount Boppy Mine, with all mining, including blast hole drilling, by hand, other than rock blasting. Manual work included the manhandling of mine trucks (or mine skips)—containing 8 to 9 cwt (around 400 to 460 kg) of rock—into and out of the lift cage, with trucks arriving at the surface at a rate of around 40 per hour.

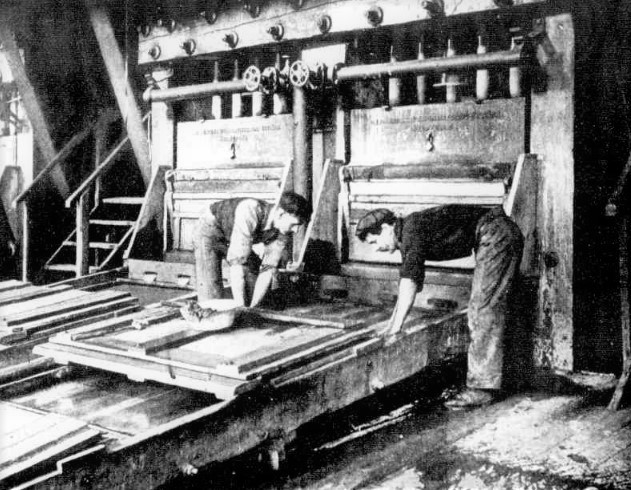
Part of the huge stamper battery, of the surface operations (Mt Boppy Mine, 1905). Showing how the amalgam process plates could be changed, without stopping the mill, it does not convey the enormous noise of its operation.

The mine was relatively well ventilated and capacious; although the lode being mined could be as narrow as three feet, in other places, it could be 80 feet wide. Workers who were in proximity to the cyanide used in the gold recovery process or to tailings sand—the waste product of that process—complained of fumes and that they developed skin rashes, known as 'cyanide rash'. Miners working underground complained that there were no sanitation arrangements in the mine, and of the risk of lung damage due to quartz rock dust (silicosis).

The core of the mine's surface operations was its huge stamper battery, used to pulverise gold-bearing rock. It had 40 stamper heads—each weighing 950 pounds, and impacting 88 times per minute—in 1904, and 60 heads in 1905. Inside the building, the noise that it made was deafening. In the village, to the immediate east of the mine, one observer opined that, "the clash of the huge batteries and the grinding of the great machinery create a noise like that of a sou'-easterly gale breaking on Bondi beach." Running on two shifts, the last ending at midnight, around 260 to 290 days per year, its continuous roar was labelled "Canbelego's lullaby"; it was reported that, "Canbelegolites get so used to it they can't go to sleep without it". Sundays were always a day of quiet, with the mine not working on the day of rest and religious observance.

===== Accidents, fatalities, and emergency medical treatment =====
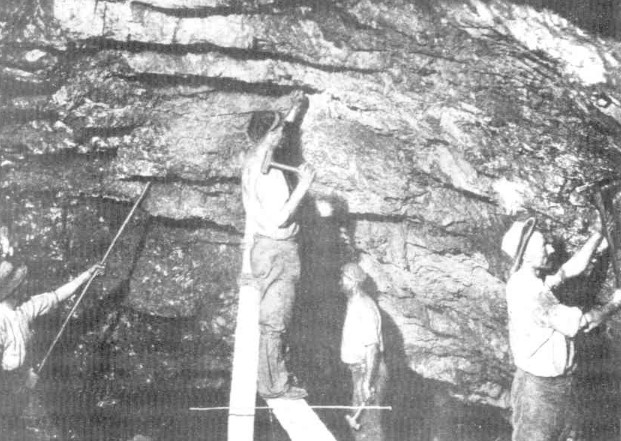
Miners working a 16 feet wide reef, inside a stope (Mt Boppy Mine, 1905). Note the absence of any personal protective equipment and the bar being used to bring down rock, from below.

Hard-rock mining was a dangerous occupation; the accident rate for Cobar district miners, in 1912, was 109.3 accidents per 1,000 workers. Over the years of its operation, up to 1922, at least ten men died as a result of accidents at the Mount Boppy mine.

Canbelego had been free of mining fatalities, until July 1905, when the first death occurred at the Mount Boppy mine, followed by another death, in 1908, and yet another in 1910. The year 1913, was seen as a particularly bad year, with two fatal accidents at the Mount Boppy mine, of eleven mining deaths in the entire Cobar district. However, 1914 was worse, when there were three fatalities at Mount Boppy mine.

Accidents at the Mount Boppy Mine—commonly due to rockfalls, but sometimes entrapment in surface machinery or falls—sometimes had fatal outcomes. In late January 1914, two men, John Sedgeman and William Stevens, died in separate accidents at the Mount Boppy mine; both left widows and children. Later, in April 1914, a miner and recent widower, William (W. J.) Nicholls, was killed instantly by a large falling rock; he was survived by his seven then-orphaned children, the eldest being just fourteen.

The tailings sand used to fill the old mine workings was also a hazard. In August 1913, Thomas Shepherd was buried under falling sand. Other miners worked to uncover him, by which time he had died of asphyxia. He left a widow and five children, the eldest only thirteen years old.

Even if a victim survived an accident, the medical facilities available to treat them, at Canbelego's small 'mine cottage hospital' (opened in late 1908) were limited, and some injuries were just too severe to treat successfully at the time. In March 1916, a miner, Edward Webb, was caught in a rockfall and pinned against timber. He sustained internal injuries and a fractured pelvis. When his condition had not improved after a day, he was relocated, on a goods train, to the district hospital at Cobar. Once there, the doctors "decided that the case was not one suitable for immediate operation and gave instructions to the matron as to treatment", and it was there that Webb died. His body was returned to Canbelego, where he is buried. Webb, who owned no property, left a widow, Emline Amy Jane Webb, and children.

The sudden death of a miner not only affected their immediate family, but also community life. A husband and father of three, John Price, who was killed in the mine in January 1910, was the secretary of Canbelego's town band and the village's librarian. Price was buried at Canbelego. He died intestate, compounding the problems of his family. Price's 18-year-old son, Leslie, had miraculously survived an earlier serious accident, with both legs broken above the knee, when he was caught in machinery, in September 1908. Price himself had experienced a near miss, in January 1908, in an incident in which the miner working alongside him, a popular man and keen sportsman, Herbert Corbett, lost his leg. Amputation of Corbett's leg, below the knee, could not arrest the process of "mortification" and, after a second operation, he died at Cobar district hospital. When Corbett's body was returned for burial, at Canbelego, the funeral cortege from the railway station, led by the town band and including members of the miners' union, the A.M.A., was said to be over three-quarters of a mile long.

Probably the last miner to die at the Mount Boppy mine, in July 1921, was a shift boss, husband, and father of three, Samuel Lecount, who fell 400 feet down a shaft. As a younger miner, he had survived two quite similar accidents. In October 1900, at the Prince of Wales mine, at Reno, near Gundagai, he fell into a shaft but, after he had fallen around 80 feet, his leg became entangled in a line, exposing the bone in his leg but saving his life. In January 1904, while working at the New Golden Gate mine, Mathinna, Tasmania, he had fallen into an ore pass (a vertical or near-vertical opening made to provide more convenient material handling by gravity and to reduce haulage distances) and then had been covered quickly by falling rocks; he had been rescued, after three hours, with only bruises and shock.

Fatal accidents also occurred outside the mine. A fall from a bullock wagon and being run over took the life of Canbelego's carrier, Owen Byrne, in 1914, a clothing fire that of old-age pensioner, Mrs Smart, in 1908, and an accidental shooting that of 15 year old Thomas Henderson, in 1915.

Fortunate to survive another accidental shooting was the mine's accountant, Eric (E. B.) Treatt, a former N.S.W. Lancer and a veteran of the South African War. In September 1903, he was at the Commercial Bank in Cobar, after accompanying the gold escort from the mine on the train. While inside the manager's office, with the bank manager and another man, he bent over to retrieve a document and a loaded revolver fell from his top pocket onto the floor. The revolver discharged and the bullet went through Treatt's thigh and entered his abdomen. Without the newly discovered X-rays, great difficulty was experienced in finding the bullet, at Cobar. He was taken to Sydney, where X-rays were used, but without a result. Treatt eventually recovered, still carrying the bullet, and returned to his job at the mine. An elder brother of state politician, Vernon Treatt, after Canbelego, he was first an A.M.P. agent and later a farmer and orchardist, near Young, where he was also an unsuccessful political candidate. Treatt was to have a long life.

===== Disease and infant mortality =====
The village had outbreaks of typhoid fever, a disease caused by bacteria. In those times, the disease was a regular visitor to settlements, but especially those with poor water quality and sanitation. More serious cases were transferred to the district hospital at Cobar. Canbelego had a serious epidemic, in 1906. Another serious bacterial disease was diphtheria, affecting especially infant children. Evidence was given, in 1905, that for every ten births in the district, there was one death before the age of one year.

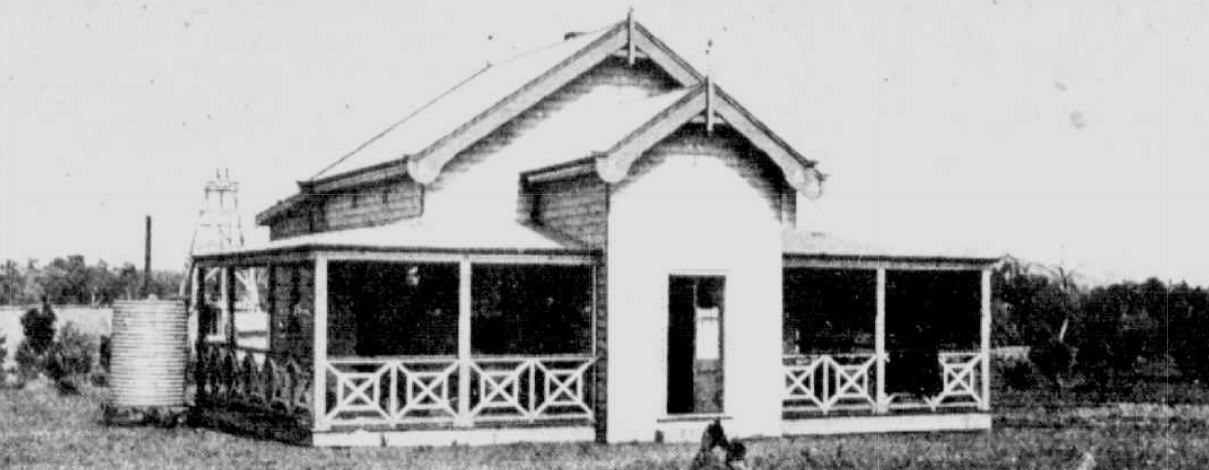
Canbelego's 'mine cottage hospital' c.1912. It was overwhelmed, in July 1919, when Spanish flu struck the mining village, and the library and billiard hall were taken over to provide space.

Some health conditions could not be treated adequately at the time. In late December 1912, William Duncan Williamson, a well-respected Scottish-born metallurgist, died unexpectedly of heart disease, aged only 39. He had been the Mount Boppy Mine's chief metallurgist for nine years, and he just been granted a provisional patent for treatment of gold and silver ores using cyanide. Earlier in 1912, Warran Williams, died at the small hospital, from pneumonia, one month short of his 21st birthday. Pneumonia also took the life, in 1913, of 39 year old Bernard Pascoe, a husband and father of six, who for twelve years had been a winding engine driver at the mine.

In July 1919, Canbelego suffered a serious outbreak of Spanish Influenza, during the second and more lethal wave of the pandemic in Australia. Most of the community were infected—temporarily closing the mine and overwhelming the small hospital—resulting in at least nine deaths in one week.

==== Crime, policing and justice ====
Canbelego had a police station and courthouse, which also serviced the surrounding district. Canbelego's police officers played an important role in the mining village's life. Two police officers, who were publicly honoured for their work at Canbelego, were Senior Constable Angus MacAulay (at Canbelego 1901–1905) and Senior Constable George Jeffrey (at Canbelego 1905–1915). In 1912, the police presence in the village was one mounted police constable and two foot constables.

The courthouse, which opened in 1904, was used for matters presided over by visiting police magistrates.

===== Thefts and other crimes =====
The gold produced at the Mount Boppy Gold Mine was a valuable and easily portable target for thieves. In July 1908, two miners, brothers named Hogan, were committed for trial on charges of stealing gold, in the form of small pieces of gold and rich pieces of gold ore, from the mine. At his trial, James Hogan was sentenced to three years penal servitude for the theft of 11½ ounces of gold. For his work in solving the gold theft, Senior Constable George Jeffrey was presented with a large inscribed gold watch, sent by the directors of the company in London.

In November 1913, a Canbelego shopkeeper, Joseph Shalala, was arrested in Sydney while trying to sell over 17 ounces of gold to the jewellers, Angus & Coote. He also admitted that six months earlier he had sold gold to the same jeweller. In total, there was around 70 ounces of retorted gold involved in the case. Prior to his arrest there had been a series of thefts of gold from the Mount Boppy mine. At his trial, Shalala gave evidence that he bought the gold separately from two men, whom he did not know. The magistrate dismissed the case on grounds of insufficient evidence to convict, but said that there was suspicion about the case. Not long afterwards, in March 1914, Shalala's shop with four dwelling rooms, his shop's stock, his horse and wagonette, and the debts customers owed to him were up for sale, by tender, in a mortgagee sale.

In 1909, Constable Davies was charged with malicious wounding of Richard Miller, a blacksmith. Miller had managed to escape, shot in the heel and buttock. Davies was eventually acquitted, on the basis that the shooting had been lawful. Evidence was given that the wounding was accidental, probably the result of a ricochet of a warning shot. Miller pleaded guilty to being on licensed premises after hours.

In June 1916, residents, particularly women, were alarmed at sightings of a masked man outside windows of private residences in the village. There were cases of petty theft and arson.

===== Murder of Mary Jane Greentree =====
Mary Jane Greentree died of a gunshot wound at Hermidale, to the east of Canbelego, in April 1913. A perfunctory coronial inquest returned an open finding. The testimony of Ernest Bradey, Greentree's common law husband, and that of Lily Derrick, Greentree's 15 year old younger sister, was that Mary had committed suicide.

Despite Hermidale lying within the adjacent police district of Nyngan, it was the involvement of Senior Constable George Jeffrey, of Canbelego, that led to the case later being identified as a murder. Greentree had already been buried, when Jeffrey took over the investigation. Following an exhumation of the body and its examination, by Dr Robert Sproule of Canbelego, Bradley was arrested and charged with murder, at Canbelego. Jeffrey had found that Lily Derrick's earlier evidence had been made under duress. Bradley's committal hearing took place at Canbelego. His horrendous abuse and violence against Greentree, up to the very day of her death, was revealed. He was subsequently tried and convicted, at Dubbo, and sentenced to be hanged, a sentence later commuted.

Following the successful outcome of the case, George Jeffrey was promoted to Sergeant and relocated to Yass, in 1915. He retired, in 1933, after 37 years with the police, as Superintendent of the Riverina Police District, at Albury.

===== The 'Canbelego Tragedy' =====
On 9 July 1916, the village was stunned by a murder suicide, referred to, at the time, as the 'Canbelego Tragedy'. A discharged soldier, William Henry Carroll, shot and killed his girlfriend, Gertrude Tessy Pearson, then fired at his own sister, Rosey Carroll, but missed; when his sister last saw him, he was reloading his rifle. Fearing for their own lives, his sister and his mother fled and summoned a policeman, Sergeant McLean, who found Pearson dead and Carroll mortally wounded by a gunshot to the head. Carroll died in hospital, later on the same day. Gertrude Pearson, believed to be from Botany, was staying as a guest of Carroll's family, at Canbelego, at Carroll's invitation, but had announced her intention to return to Sydney on the following Monday. Just before the shooting she and Carroll had quarrelled. She was described as a "refined girl" who was "said to have been 17 years old, but hardly appeared that age."

Carroll had been an army recruit, in training at Liverpool Camp; during that time he met Gertrude Pearson and they had formed what was described as an "intense attachment". He was discharged, after he had participated in what became known as the 'Liverpool mutiny', in February 1916. It had started as a protest strike by recruits, but escalated into a massive and violent, alcohol-fuelled riot, in Liverpool and later in the streets of central Sydney. Carroll and a five-years-older man, John Carroll (possibly a relative), both had been sentenced to two months of imprisonment, for violently attacking a police constable during the riot. Carroll's father stated that his son always had a violent temper and was "madly jealous" around Miss Pearson. The coroner's findings were willful murder and suicide. Gertrude Pearson was buried in Cobar, not in Canbelego. Although the only people she knew in the district were the Carroll family, in an outpouring of sympathy, her funeral was well attended.

==== Wartime ====
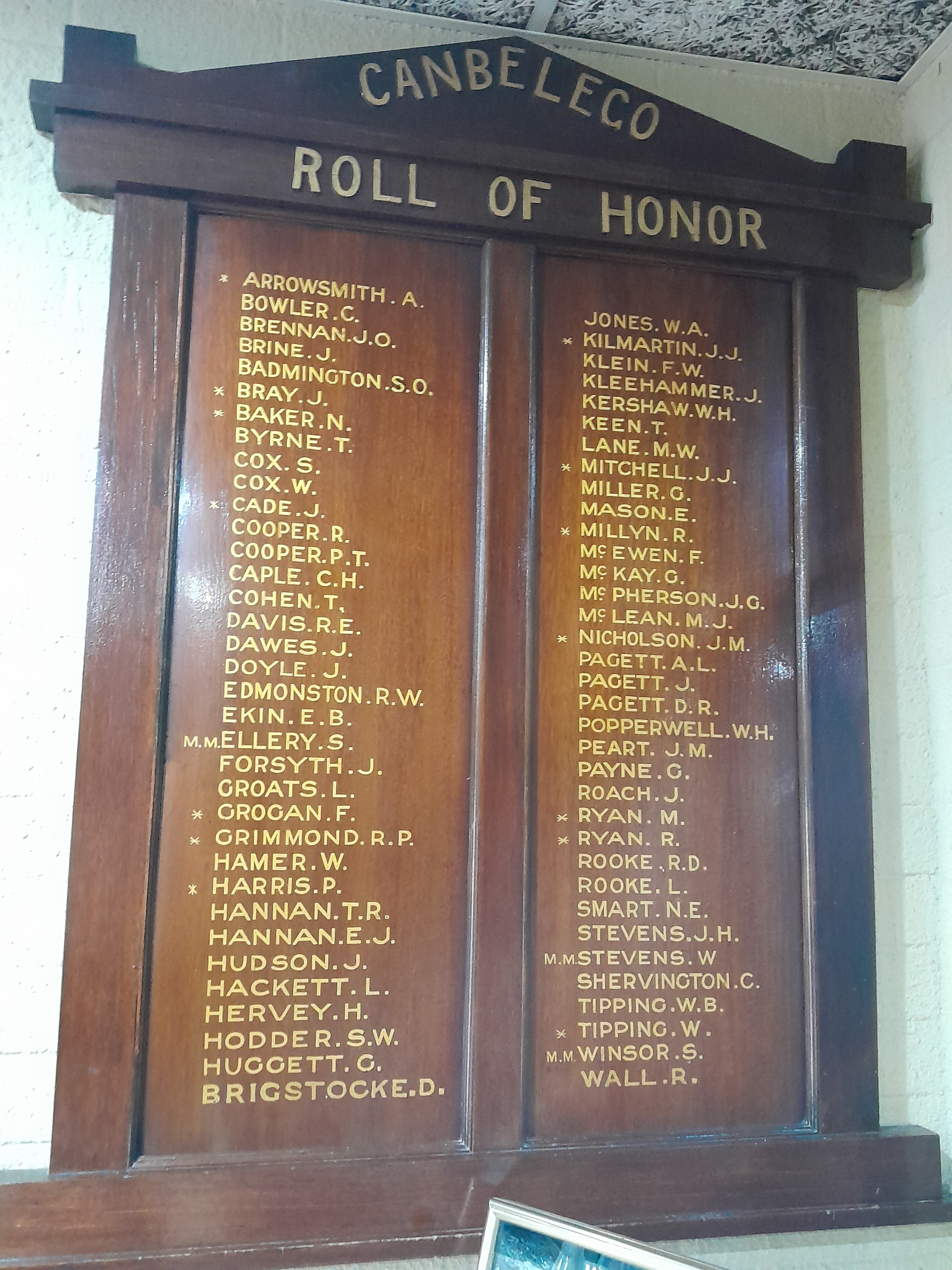
Canbelego's WWI Roll of Honour, now in the foyer of the Cobar Memorial Services Club.

The village formed a Patriotic League, in January 1915, which initially was a fund raising organisation, but which by mid year was demonstrating support for the recruiting effort. By mid September 1915, it had become the Recruiting and Patriotic League (later Association), which was chaired by the manager of the mine, James Negus.

A contemporaneous report states that Canbelego had raised three contingents of volunteer recruits—the last of consisting of eight young men—by September 1915. By late January 1916, 52 men had volunteered, reportedly over 80 by August 1916, and young men still left for the war, up to 1918.

A roll of honour memorial from Canbelego, for the First World War, lists the names of 71 men, of whom 14 had died. The roll of honour does not include all the soldiers who came from the village or enlisted there, nor does it identify all the dead. The honour roll is full; perhaps its makers just ran out of space. However, it is more likely that, as Canbelego had already begun to decline by the end of 1918, some soldiers returned from the war to live in other places and were honoured there, or were honoured where their parents lived.

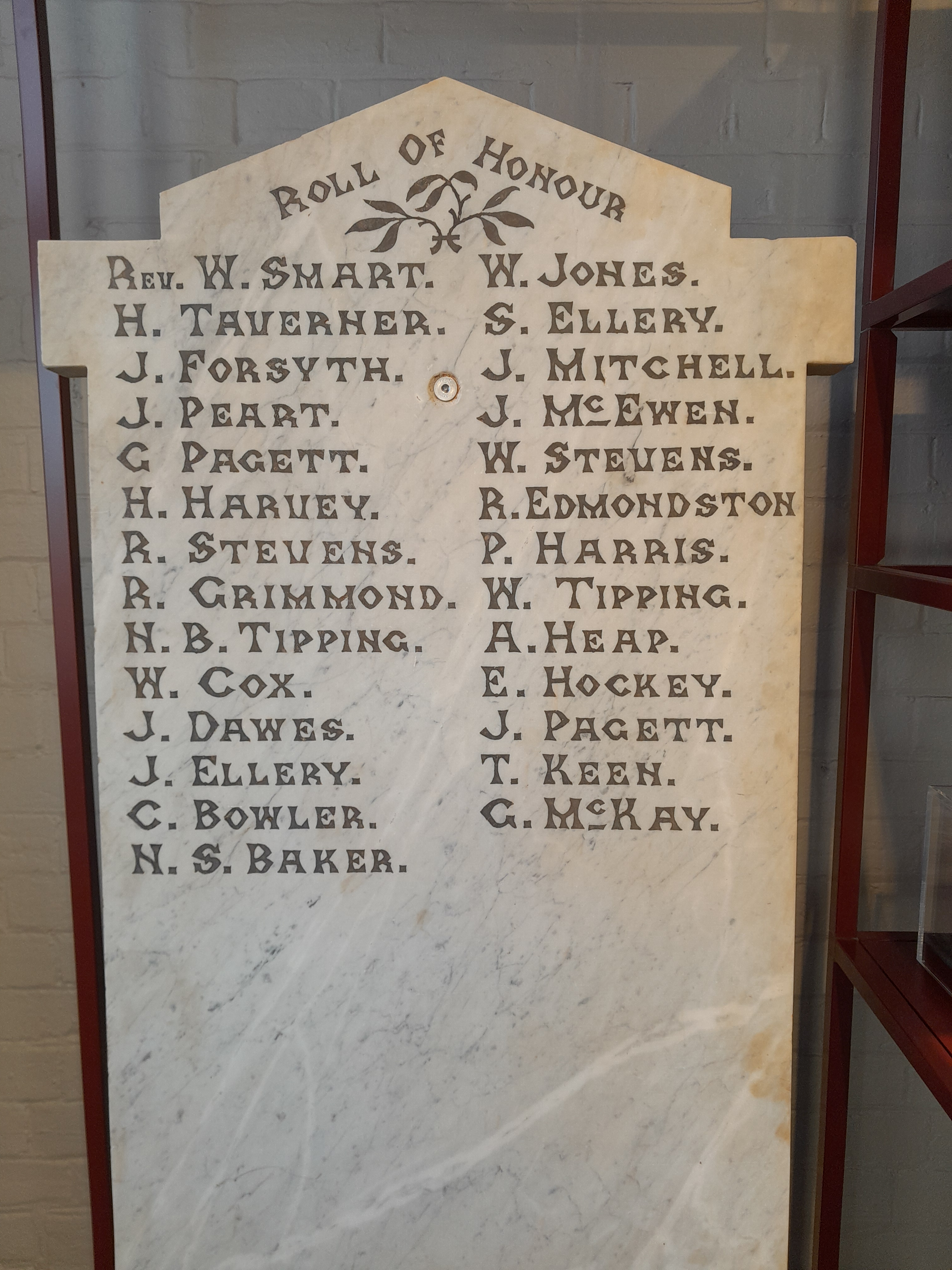
The other, smaller, Roll of Honour, from Canbelego, probably from its Methodist church, now in the Great Cobar Museum.

There is a second, far smaller honour roll—it is of uncertain origin but probably from Canbelego's Methodist church— showing only 27 names, but six of those names are not shown on the larger roll. There are 17 men, from Canbelego, who appear on neither of the surviving rolls but were in a list of 75 names of volunteers (some duplicated) who had left or were about to leave Canbelego for the war, which appeared in a newspaper report of February 1917; then there are three more from a newspaper report of August 1916. There are at least two more; Trooper W. J. Murphy, of the 7th Light Horse—identified as being from Canbelego, in a report of his wounding, in October 1915—and another volunteer, in early 1918, James Huggett. It seems that the village actually sent around 99 volunteers, of whom, at least, 16 died; many, if not most, were wounded.

Even as the village embraced the war enthusiastically, and more recruits readied to leave for the war, in October 1915, the first invalid soldier, Private Henry 'Harry' Taverner, returned from the war. Arriving by train at Boppy Mount, he was given a procession from there to Canbelego, led by the village's band, and received a rapturous welcome from Canbelego's inhabitants. Welcomed home as a 'returning hero', all he wanted was to be able to go to the quiet of his home and rest. A planned public reception, it seems, never took place. Wounded in the face at Gallipoli, suffering from a 'nervous breakdown', and apparently freely revealing some horrific war experiences, he would never be fit to return to the front. One of the original Anzacs, service number 1633, his name is missing from the Canbelego village's roll of honour, but appears on the church's roll. It seems that he had soon left Canbelego for Portland, where he had relatives; his name appears there on the local war memorial. He did make an apparent success of his middle years of life, but he continued to suffer grievously from the ill effects of his war service, for the rest of his days, and it probably contributed to his violent death, in 1946, aged just 51.

An early recruit was a 38 year old married man and father of two, Thomas Sinclair Keen. He had served in the Second Boer War, with the 3rd Bushman's Contingent, but said that "his conscience has moved him to again join the colours, which this time are in jeopardy, and set an example to some of those able bodied young men with smiling faces and no claim of any kind on them except their faint hearts". He was president of Canbelego's branch of the Amalgamated Miner's Association, which was the mine worker's trade union, and secretary of the village's band, football club, and Labour Electoral League. Within a year, the Labour movement in Australia would be deeply divided over the issue of conscription. Keen served as a Sergeant with the Engineer Corps. He survived the war, returning to Canbelego, as an invalid due to his wounds and sickness, in September 1917. He was given a reception by the Patriotic Association upon his return.

Reverend William Smart was the minister of Canbelego's Methodist church and a supporter of the war effort. He enlisted as a private soldier and served for 20 months, as a stretcher bearer in the First Field Ambulance, before returning to Canbelego, as an invalid, in September 1917. He too was given a reception upon his return.

Michael William Lane had originally enlisted in the army in the mining town of Mount Morgan, Queensland, in 1914, but deserted, from a troop ship in Melbourne. In 1915, he had deserted a woman, Wilhelmina 'Minnie' Henderson, who was expecting their child, in Canbelego, before fleeing to Queensland. Once there, in October 1915, he enlisted, at Enoggera, under an alias, Michael Dunn, and also giving false family details, but then deserted the army, for a second time. In March 1916, he was arrested in Sydney and sent back to Canbelego, where he was ordered to pay support costs for an infant child, in lieu of 12 months imprisonment. In April 1916, he was arrested, by the police at Canbelego, for twice deserting the army, and sent back to Queensland under military escort for Court-martial. At some point, he was "attached to a Sappers Corps, at Seymour in Victoria". It seems that, in August 1916, he had absented himself, for a third time, and was again arrested in Canbelego, and sent to Sydney under escort. He embarked for war in September 1916, and later served, very briefly, as a sapper in the 1st Tunnelling Company, before becoming ill. He survived the war, returning to Australia, in December 1917, and being discharged as medically unfit, in January 1918. His two enlistments, two names, and two regimental numbers led to confusing military records. His name, his apparent attachment to Canbelego, and a reported former occupation as an assistant storekeeper—he had also been a miner and a general labourer— hint at the familial relationship with another Michael Lane, his father and owner of a general store at Canbelego; that connection alone probably explains why his name appears on the larger of Canbelego's surviving rolls of honour. His father died in July 1928, intestate, and Lane himself was dead, before he could receive any inheritance. Although he had married Minnie in 1916, and they had two sons together, Lane died by suicide, at his home in Chatswood, in 1930, aged just 38, after what seems to have been a troubled later life.

One of the names missing from both honour rolls is Maurice Levy, son of a Canbelego and Nymagee business owner, also Maurice Levy. Enlisting in 1915, he was a sergeant in 1917, when he was promoted to second lieutenant. He survived the war, but possibly never returned to Canbelego.

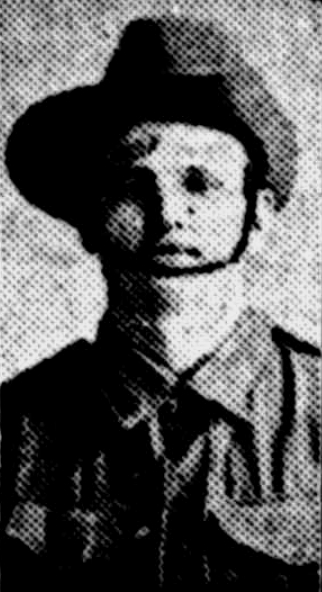
Sapper John Bray, killed in action, 1916, aged 30.

Others did not return from the war. The first to die, in June 1915, was Private Albert Edward Heap, whose parents had kept the Royal Hotel, in Canbelego, until it burned down in February 1915. Dying of wounds on a hospital ship (H.M.H.S. Sicilia), Private Heap was 'buried at sea'. His name is missing from the village's honour roll, but is listed on the church's roll.

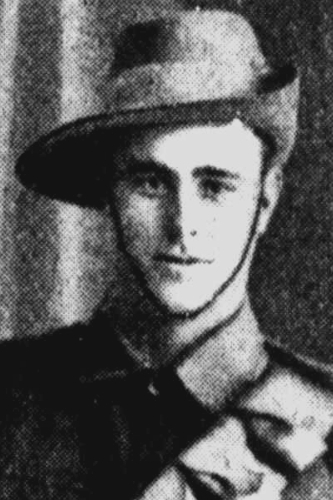
Gunner Walter Tipping, died of wounds, 1916, aged 22.

John Bray, perhaps unsurprisingly for a miner, was a sapper in the 3rd Tunnelling Company, A.I.F., when he was killed in action in France, on 12 September 1916. He was buried at the Pont du Hem Military Cemetery, at La Gorgue, with another sapper killed on the same day. Well-known, as Jack Bray, he had been a local footballer and amateur boxer. The casualties, killed and wounded soldiers from Canbelego, continued to accumulate right up to the armistice, in November 1918.

Lance-Corporal Joseph Ellery, whose brother Stephen had been killed in action, returned to Canbelego, in January 1918, after recovering from wounds, wearing a Military Medal. Asked how he had won the medal, he remarked that it was because his officer, who was by then dead, had lived long enough after the engagement to complete the recommendation. He said that many awards to brave soldiers had not occurred, simply because so many officers had been killed or disabled by wounds, before making their recommendations. His name too is missing from Canbelego village's roll of honour—his dead brother Stephen's name is there, credited with Joseph's Military Medal—but it appears on the memorial at Neville. Both brothers' names appear on the church's roll. Gunner Stephen Ellery's final resting place was short lived; his grave was obliterated by shelling, during the Spring Offensive of 1918.

Driver Sidney Windsor (or 'Winsor' on the roll of honour), won the Military Medal, upon the recommendation of Major-General Ewen Sinclair-MacLagan, commander of the 4th Division. Windsor had brought up and attached a limber to an artillery piece, under heavy shell fire, and saved the gun single-handed. He returned to Canbelego, in time to attend a meeting, held in July 1919, to organise the village's peace celebration—following the signing of the Treaty of Versailles. The timing of the planned celebration could not have been worse—it corresponded with the arrival of Spanish Influenza—and probably the celebration was never held. By the time that the war had ended, Canbelego's decline had already begun.

Sargeant Wilfred 'Fred' Stevens survived the First World War. He was wounded at Bullecourt and on at least three other occasions by the war's end, winning the Military Medal. Years later, he lied about his age to enlist during the Second World War, as a private, and was killed at Tobruk in 1941, aged 44.

==== Decline ====
===== Last years of Mount Boppy Mine =====
In 1917, the population was said to be around 2,000 but, in February of that year, hard rock mining was suspended at the Mount Boppy Gold Mine. The mine reopened in early 1918, after the sinking of a new shaft was completed, and the lode near the old shaft (Taylor's shaft) was then mined. Some surface plant was also relocated, due to concerns about 'creep' in the ground under the area where the surface plant had been located. Despite assurances that the closure was temporary, the population began to decline during the approximately twelve-month interruption to mining, probably as there was plenty of work for miners elsewhere in the Cobar region. Some unemployed men from Canbelego found work, in 1917, building the extension of the railway line from Cobar to the CSA Mine.

The frequent droughts in the Cobar region had caused the Mount Boppy mine to shutdown on numerous occasions over its life, including in late 1918; it happened again in 1919 and in early 1920. Like Cobar and Elouera, water was brought to Canbelego by rail, but the interruptions to work at the mine brought hardship when mine employees were stood down. The drought would be a long one, which was still affecting mining operations at the Mt Boppy mine, into the early 1920s. By March 1920, as the drought continued, Canbelego had begun to lose some of its weatherboard buildings, which were sold, demolished and taken to other places. Canbelego residents were paying six shillings (6/-) for 100 gallons of water, which was brought by rail, from Narromine to Boppy Mount—a distance of 213 km—and then by road to the village, in April 1920; at the time, an ounce of gold was worth £5/13/1, less than the cost for residents to buy in 2,000 gallons (7,570 litres) of Narromine water.

Rain came in June 1920, allowing production to restart, but around the same time the miners were in dispute over wage rates. Nonetheless, the mine was able to produce enough gold, by the end of December 1920, to comfortably hold its place, for 1920, as the largest gold producer in New South Wales.

On Monday 5 September 1921, the company announced that the mine had closed—consequently the last mining shift had ended on the previous Saturday at midnight—resulting in the loss of 200 mining jobs at Canbelego. Some work continued, for a time, processing tailings and remnant ore, and twenty miners worked the old mine, as tribute miners during 1922.

By September 1921, work for miners in the Cobar region was already scarce. In 1919, the huge Great Cobar mine had closed as did the Chesney Mine which depended on its smelter. In 1920, the C.S.A mine at Elouera closed unexpectedly due to an underground fire, as did the Gladstone Mine which used its smelter. In July 1921, the Occidental Gold Mine at Wrightville closed, and the widespread expectations that it would reopen were dashed in July 1922. After Mount Boppy closed, there were no longer any large mines working in the Cobar region, and there would not be until work resumed at the Occidental Mine, subsequently the New Occidental Mine, in 1933. Only the gold mine at The Peak, to the south of Wrightville, remained in operation after 1922. Many miners and their families left the district altogether.

===== After the mine closed =====
The final closure of the Mount Boppy Gold Mine, in 1922–1923, brought an end to hope for a revival of Canbelego's prosperity. A gold discovery and rush at nearby Muriel Tank, halfway to Hermidale, proved minor, and nothing came of a mining claim pegged in Canbelego village itself. In 1921, the population was down to around 1,000, but it rapidly fell still further, without a major source of employment in the area. There was an immediate effect on the village; both the Miners' Arms hotel and Federal hotel closed, and the convent school closed at the end of 1923. The buildings owned by the mining company and the village's library of books were sold off, with the other mine assets, by auction, over three days at the end of August 1923.

The hospital building had been sold as part of the mine assets, but then was bought back by the Mount Boppy company, and made available to the community at a peppercorn rent, becoming known as the Mount Boppy District Hospital. By early 1924, the local hospital committee was struggling to keep it funded.

The village's domestic electricity supply came from a dynamo at the mine, and it therefore ceased when the mine's surface operations shutdown, probably during 1922. The motion picture show shut down, during the winter months of 1920, and was replaced, at least initially, with a Saturday night dance. The motion picture show closed for good around 1921, dependent as it was upon electricity.

In January 1922, there was a dust storm that damaged some buildings, followed by 84 points of rain. The telephone line to the village was struck by lightning, and telephone equipment at the post office caught fire, interrupting telephone and telegraph communication.

With a declining population, the price of houses collapsed; in January 1923, four houses were advertised for a total price of £35. The fate of some of Canbelgo's houses and other buildings was to be pulled down and sold off as building materials. Equipment at the mine that had been sold was being demolished and removed during 1924.

Canbelego had no fire brigade, and its remaining citizens—the surface workers from the mine being no longer available—had to deal with building fires themselves. Canbelego's public venues were Levy's Hall and an adjoining building, which in 1920 was the venue of Levy and Wall's Picture Show, the village's cinema. The morning after it had been used for a dance, the public hall was destroyed by fire in March 1924, three months after another fire destroyed Lane's general store, in December 1923. The disused picture show venue had already been renamed as 'Levy and Wall's Open Air Stadium', in January 1924, probably indicating that it always had been an open-air venue. The destroyed public hall was insured. However, the picture show building was saved by volunteers. It was reported that—after the fires and earlier building removals— "The town is beginning to assume a rather dilapidated appearance".

Later, in 1925, it was reported that, "a handful is left hanging on in hope that the old field will come again" and in 1929, "there are very few houses and shops in Canbelego". Limited gold production between 1929 and 1941 allowed the village to persist, with diminished circumstances. In 1931, the population was still 261 and the village had one hotel, two stores, two butchers, a bakery, and its public school, with 40 pupils. In 1944, the school had "less than a dozen children".

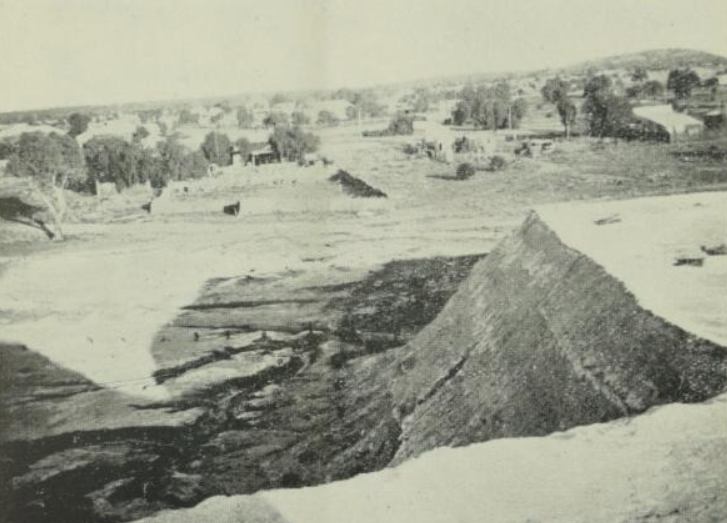
Canbelego c.1938, viewed from atop a heap of tailings.

By the 1930s, the goats that had once been kept in the village and other mining settlements in the region were running wild. In 1933, 200 goats were sent from Canbelego to Lanyon, near Queanbeyan. From 1933 to 1935, a deposit of galena with some gold, lying north-east of the village. known as the Newhaven shaft, was mined underground and in shallow pits.

Radio broadcasts could be heard in the Cobar district, by 1927, one of the few positive developments for Canbelego residents, even if the signal was from far-away centres and reception only available at nighttime. Radio broadcasts would begin, from Cumnock and Dubbo, still some distance from Canbelego, only in 1935 and 1936 respectively. However, a mains electricity supply for Canbelego was decades away, and any radio sets would need to rely upon dry batteries or farm lighting supplies for their power.

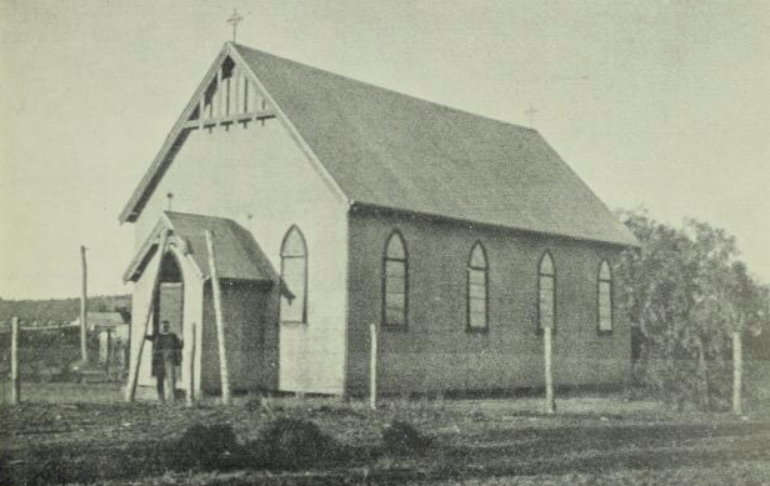
Anglican Church of the Good Shepherd, Canbelego (1935)

Another significant improvement was that the village had obtained an ambulance, by April 1926, which allowed patient transport to larger towns; the hospital closed before then. The hospital building was handed over to the Country Women's Association. A bush nurse, funded by the local CWA branch, was stationed there and used the building; she also drove and serviced the ambulance herself. In 1937, the local branch of the Country Women's Association had 37 members. As in many country towns, the organisation played a key part in raising funds for community purposes.

In 1938, the village—by then described as "one hotel and cluster of houses"— had briefly relived its former glory, when its Country Rugby Leaque team—the smallest club of the 500 in the state—won 20 of its 22 games, and it had another successful year in 1940. The team was still in existence in 1954.

By 1949, there were only 93 inhabitants left. A visitor in 1951 wrote of the village and its old Anglican church, ”Here can be seen the little grey church on a windy hill, which in times past was surrounded by numerous houses, but now stands almost alone." By 1954, the village reportedly had just 24 houses.

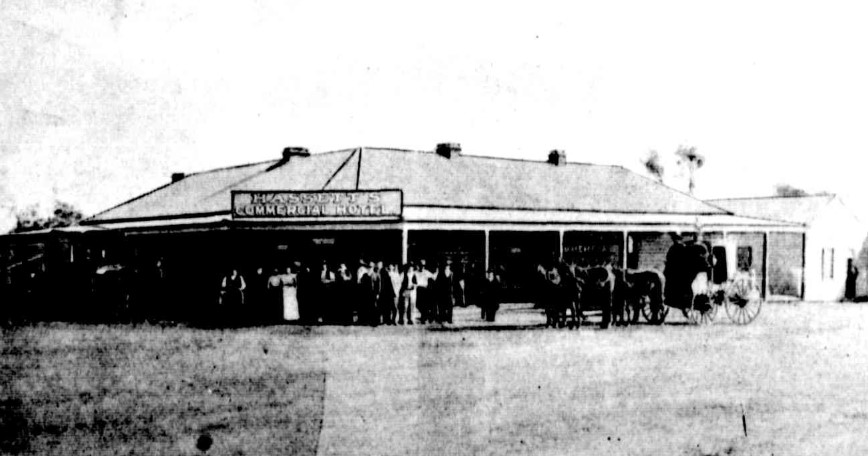
The Commercial Hotel - The longest-lived of Canbelego's four hotels c. 1904. This building was destroyed by fire in 1956.

The old Commercial Hotel was destroyed by fire, in 1956. An attempt was made to remove its licence to Dapto, in 1958, but it reopened, in a new hotel building, at a different site in Edward Street, in late 1959. The opening of the new hotel, officially the Arunta Hotel, but better known as the Canbelego Hotel, was cause for celebration, with a sports day, opening ceremony, and dance.

It was not until 1958 that the Barrier Highway was sealed, between Cobar and Boppy Mount, making it easier for Canbelego's remaining residents to travel to the nearest larger town, Cobar. The poor road was something that probably had helped to preserve some amenities at Canbelego. However, once the road was sealed there was less need for amenities there. The road, to Nyngan, in the other direction, was not sealed until the early 1960s, but, once it was, there was probably less reason for travellers to stop at Canbelego.

1957 was a pivotal year of decline. The Mount Boppy District Hospital, a bush nursing station since the mid-1920s, closed in 1957. After late 1957, Canbelego no longer had its Court of Petty Sessions and Warden's Court. The police station closed in 1957. From 1958, Canbelego finally had a local government, as a part of the newly proclaimed Cobar Shire.

By 1962, almost all that was left of the facilities of the village were the hotel, public school—with a few pupils, each of whom planted a tree in the school grounds that year—and the post office. The school closed in April 1969. The post office closed in June 1987.

During the last twenty years of its life, the hotel at Canbelego, then hosted by Mick James and his wife Cheryl, became something of a minor tourist attraction. During the years that he was in Canbelego, Mick James — using the stage names 'The Desert Man' and 'Canbelego Mick'— made recordings of his Australian country music songs, including one 14-track LP record, 'The Pilliga Yowie', and at least one single. The hotel burned down; source vary, stating either in 1989 or in 1990. This time the hotel was not rebuilt; its licence was transferred to a hotel in faraway Coogee. As late as 1995, Canbelego still had a village hall, probably its last public building.

== Boppy Mountain ==
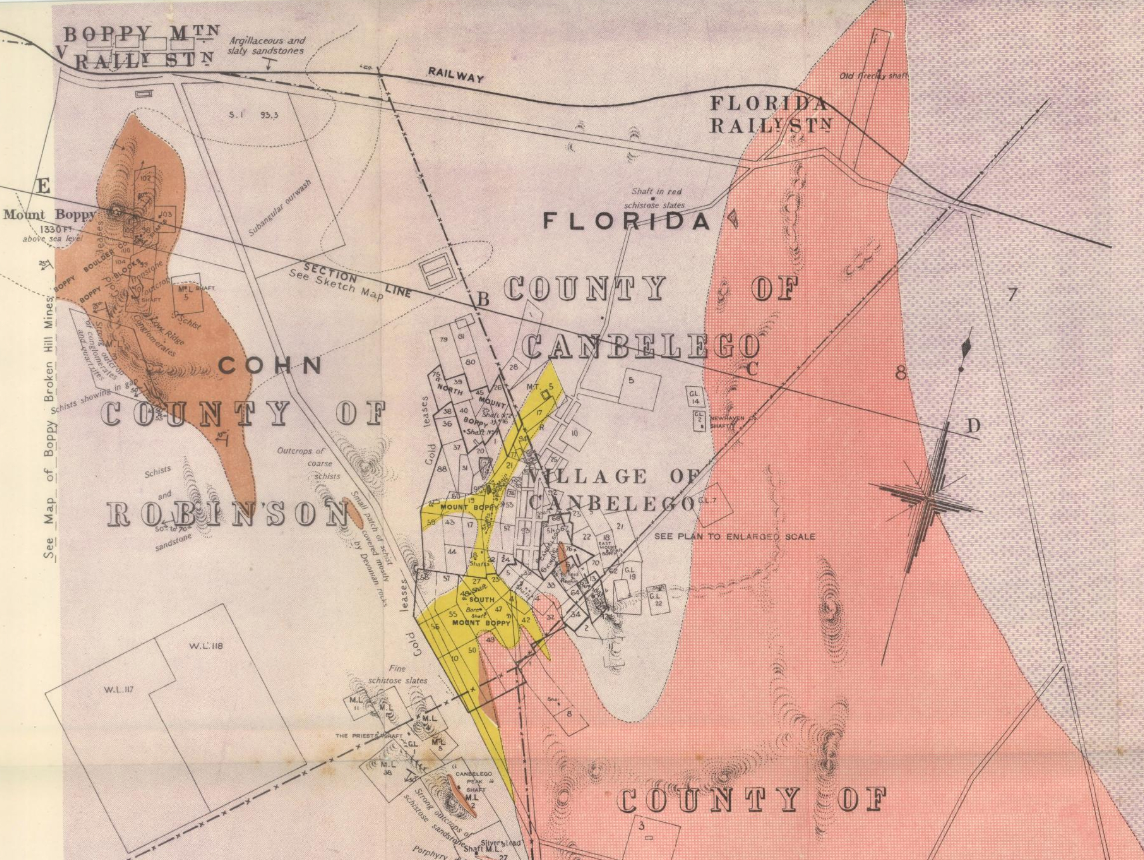
Canbelego and surrounds, including Boppy Mountain railway station, its hamlet, and Florida railway platform. (Portion of geological survey map, E. C. Andrews.)

Boppy Mountain was the railway station for Canbelego, on the Cobar railway line. It was 4.5 km by road to the north-west of the village of Canbelego, and 710.8 km by rail from Sydney. When it opened, in July 1892, the station was named Mount Boppy.

The railway station predated the discovery of gold and the establishment of a settlement at Canbelego. The discoverer of the gold-bearing lode, a prospector, Michael Delaney O'Grady, lived near the railway station. It was while walking back to his home, in September 1896, that he recognised the lode, where it was exposed in a watercourse.

At latest by 1897, the word order on the railway station's sign was reversed. The railway station sign then read, Boppy Mount, and the station was sometimes referred to by that name. It was an abbreviation of its new official name, Boppy Mountain. The change, from Mount Boppy, may have been due to confusion of the postal address, with the newer settlement, at Canbelego, which used the postal address 'Mount Boppy Mine', until January 1901.

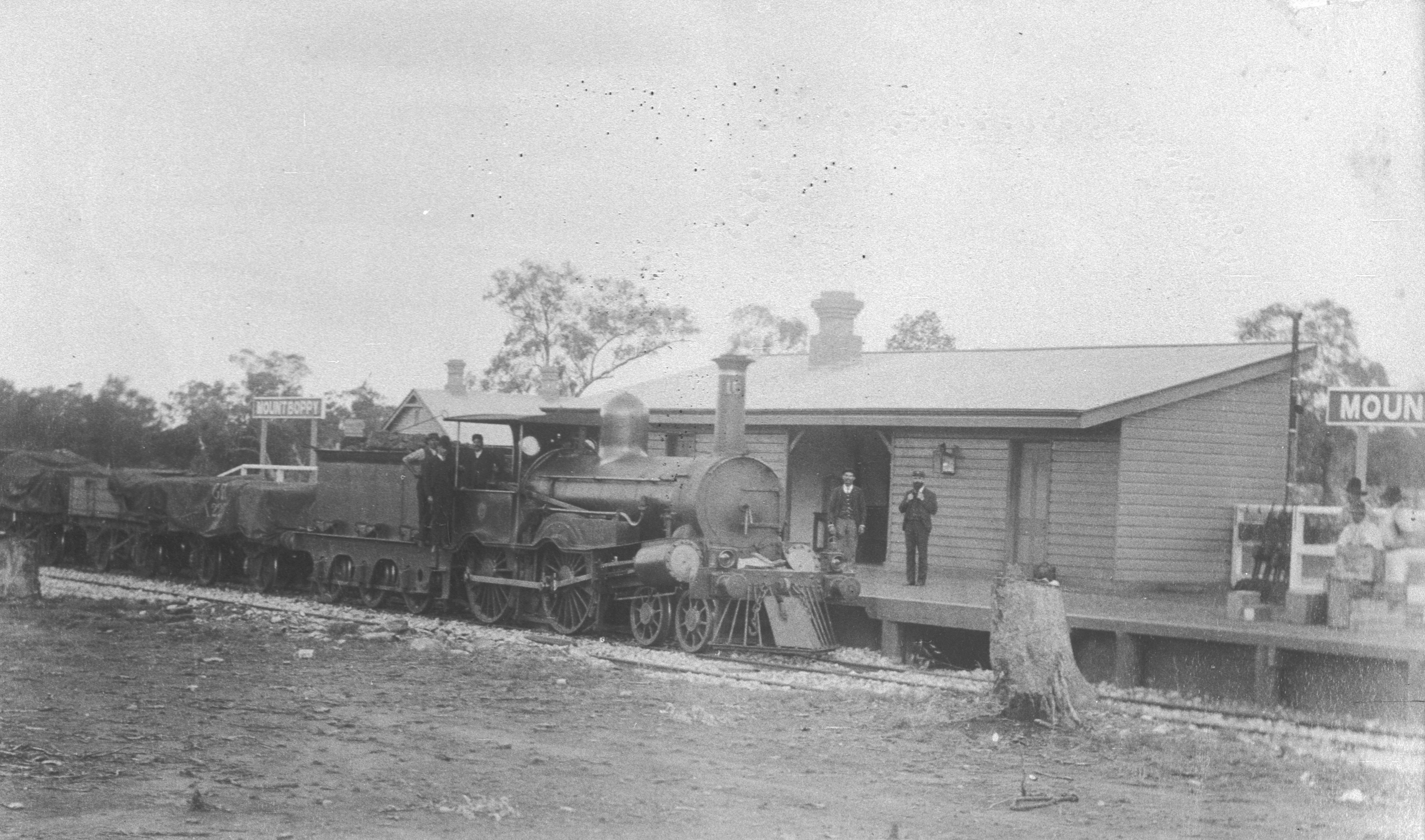
The station, originally named Mount Boppy, soon after it opened, in 1892.

In the days before motorised road transport, the railway at Boppy Mountain was vital to the area around Canbelego, not only for the mining community, but also to ship wool grown in the surrounding area. A hamlet existed there, into the early 20th century.

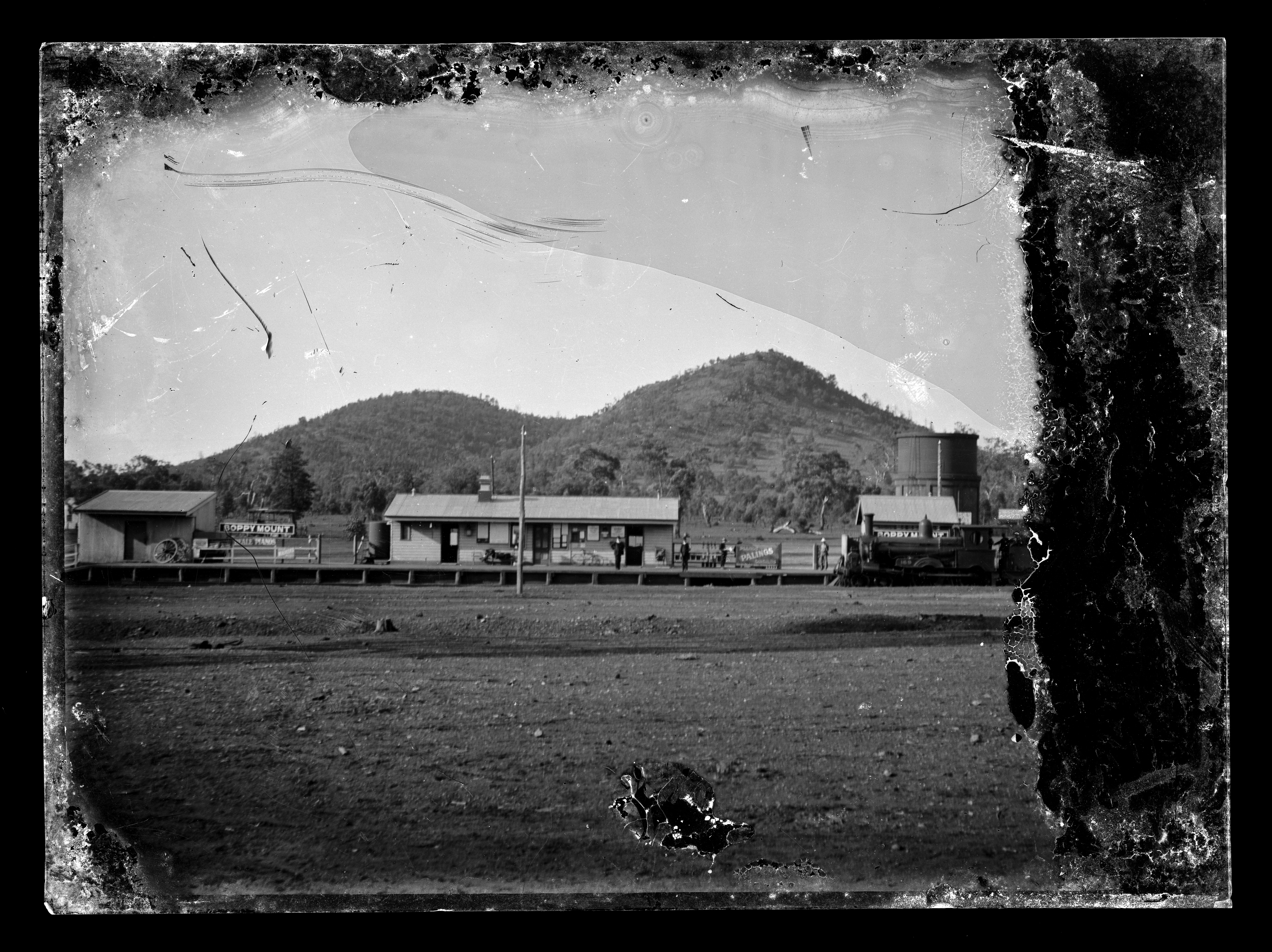
Boppy Mountain railway station, c.1910, with its sign reading 'Boppy Mount'. In the background, is the landform, Mount Boppy. The water tower is on the right.

The railway station and its hamlet lay close to the landform, Mount Boppy. Mount Boppy rises around 150 m (500 feet) from the surrounding country, and its peak is 405 m (1330 feet) above sea level. There was a water tower at Boppy Mount, for replenishing trains. The railways built a dam, or 'tank', to harvest rainwater from a 170-acre catchment on Mount Boppy. As well as station staff, there were fettlers, who maintained the railway, stationed at Boppy Mountain. On the side of Mount Boppy was a gold mine, known as Boppy Boulder Gold Mine, which was employing 23 men in 1912.

The railway platform and buildings were on the southern side of the railway line, while the hamlet was to its north. There was a hotel, known as Boppy Mountain Hotel—on the northern side of the railway line—and "one or two private houses". In 1905, there was also a butcher's shop. There was a post office—initially a receiving office, but a full-service post office from September 1896—until around 1957. The post office seems mainly to have been used to receive and dispatch mails to and from Canbelego.

Possession of the hotel was the subject of a legal dispute between the lessee and the owner, the lessee's own mother, in 1909. Simultaneously, the lessee's wife sued her mother-in-law for defamation, being awarded a farthing in damages. The Boppy Mountain Hotel was destroyed by fire in February 1916, and it seems that it was never rebuilt.

In 1903, there was one passenger train a day bound for Cobar, running six days of the week. It arrived in the evening. In 1932, the service was reduced, from three trains per week to two.

From March 1950, there was a once weekly diesel railcar service, from Nyngan to Cobar, on Tuesdays, and returning to Nyngan on Wednesdays. From May 1950, goods to be sent by rail to Boppy Mountain were received at Darling Harbour Yard, on Mondays only. During the 1950s, in times of water shortage, water was still railed to Cobar.

At some time—probably around 1957—the Boppy Mountain railway station became unattended, but it remained used by passenger services. In 1957, the Far West Express, using a faster air conditioned diesel railcar, was introduced; it operated between Nyngan and Cobar, and return, on each Thursday only. Passenger services on the Cobar line ended on 22 September 1975, and were replaced by road coaches. Boppy Mountain railway station became disused, but an official closing date had not been recorded as at February 1979. It has been said that the disused station building was blown up, by some workers involved in the development of the Elura Mine, after they had left the hotel at Canbelego. In 1993, a land reservation of 6.7 hectares, lying south of the railway line at Boppy Mountain, dating from September 1892 and for "railway purposes"—it probably includes the railway 'tank'—was revoked. The land was added to an adjacent leasehold.

== Florida ==
There was another platform, at a railway siding called Florida, located to the north of Canbelego village, which closed in 1974. There was a sheep run of the same name to its immediate north, which still exists.

== Meryula ==
Within the boundaries of the modern-day rural locality of Canbelego, lay another railway platform and siding, Meryula, which opened in 1892. Meryula lay 21.8 km west from Boppy Mountain, by rail. The siding was used to load cypress pine logs. It was probably named after a large sheep run, Meryula, which was about six miles away from the railway, to the south, and lay to the east of Illewong. There was a small settlement near the railway, which already had a hotel—Meryula Hotel—from 1881, that remained open until 1909, and a school—known as Meryula Siding—from November 1910 to March 1916. Meryula railway platform closed in 1974.

The school, Meryula Siding, is not to be confused with another school, known as, Meryula (after 1913, Merihula), which once existed in Northern NSW. Meryula, within modern-day Canbelego, should not be confused with another historical locality, also named Meryula, now within the modern-day boundaries of Tottenham, nor with the cadestral Parish of Meryula (County of Kennedy) that is also near Tottenham.

== Remnants ==
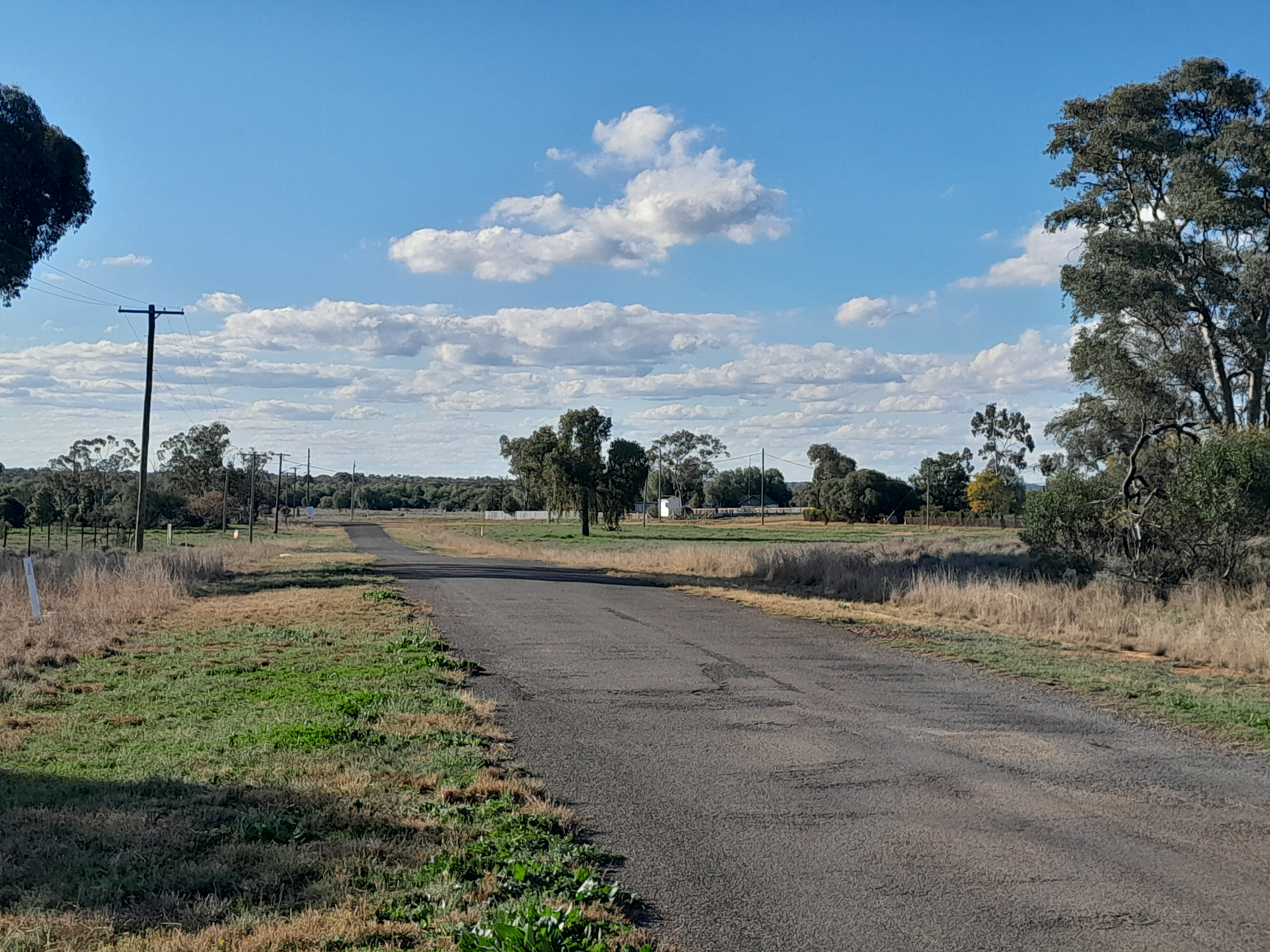
Edward Street, the main street of the village, looking north (August 2024). In the other direction, the sealed road soon ends, becoming Canbelego Road, a little used unsealed route to Nymagee.

The village no longer has any public facilities or services. Recent mining activity has had only a very small impact in arresting Canbelego's decline.

Edward Street, the main street of the village, other streets of the old village, and allotments still appear on maps but, although some streets still exist, the land is now mainly vacant and much of it is owned by the Cobar Shire. The sporting ground, Canbelego Park, still exists, in Florida Street, together with the adjoining abandoned playground and ruins of tennis courts, but is now long disused, and the route of the erstwhile racecourse is still discernible in aerial views.

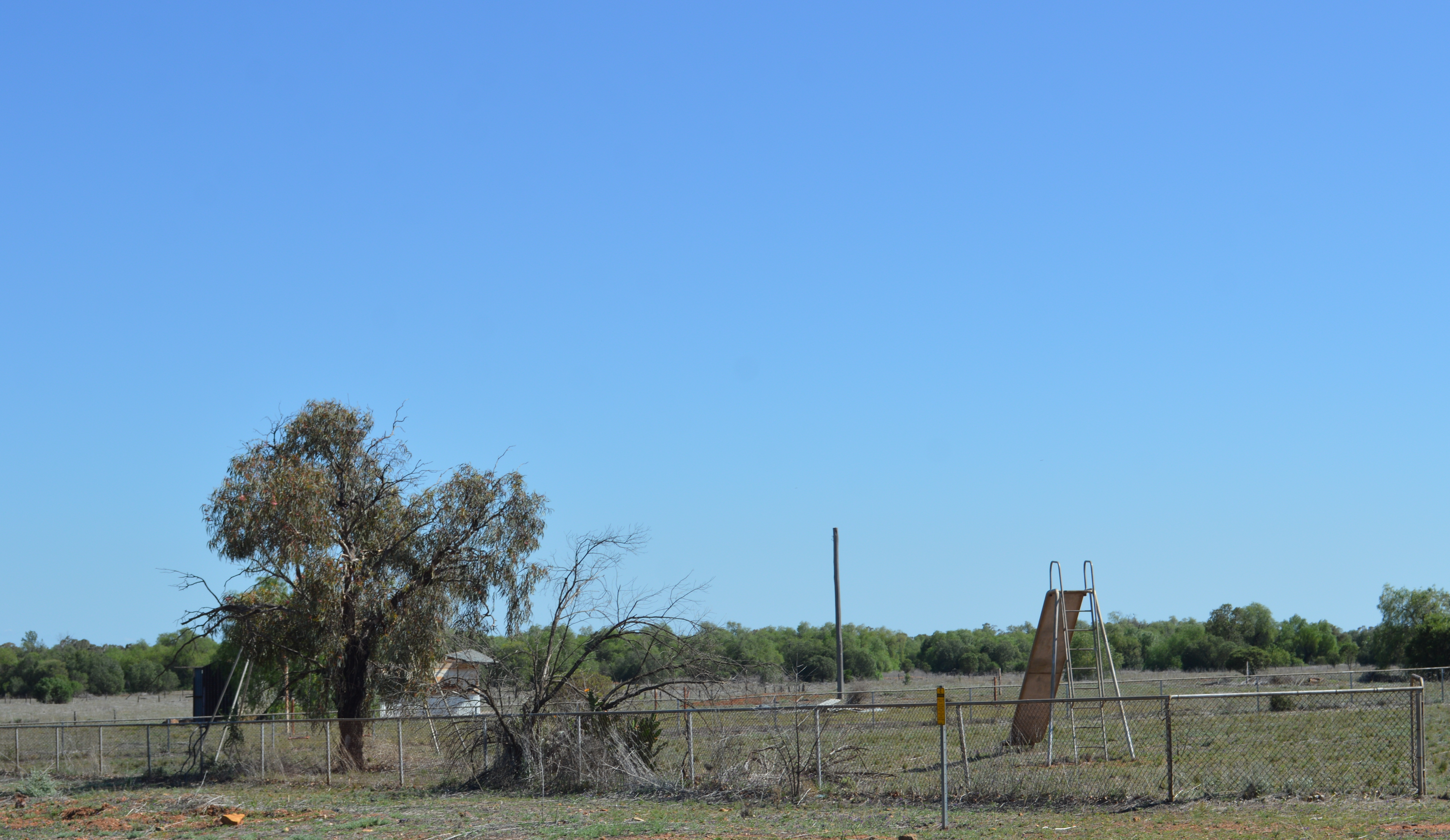
Abandoned playground at Canbelego (2017)

The dead residents now outnumber the living, at Canbelego. There is a lonely and rarely visited cemetery to the north-north-west of the old village, about 2 km along the continuation of Coronga Street. Most of its fine marble monuments, dating from Canbelego's heyday, are the work of Cobar monumental mason, Charles Bray. Sapper John Bray, buried in faraway France, is remembered by an inscription on his mother's gravestone. Similarly remembered, on the gravestone of his father, the bullocky, Owen Byrne, is Private Walter Edwin Byrne, a miner who enlisted in Melbourne, killed in 1917; his actual grave, in Flanders, was lost and it is still unidentified, somewhere around where he died in Glencorse Wood, a small wood nearby to the larger and better known Polygon Wood.

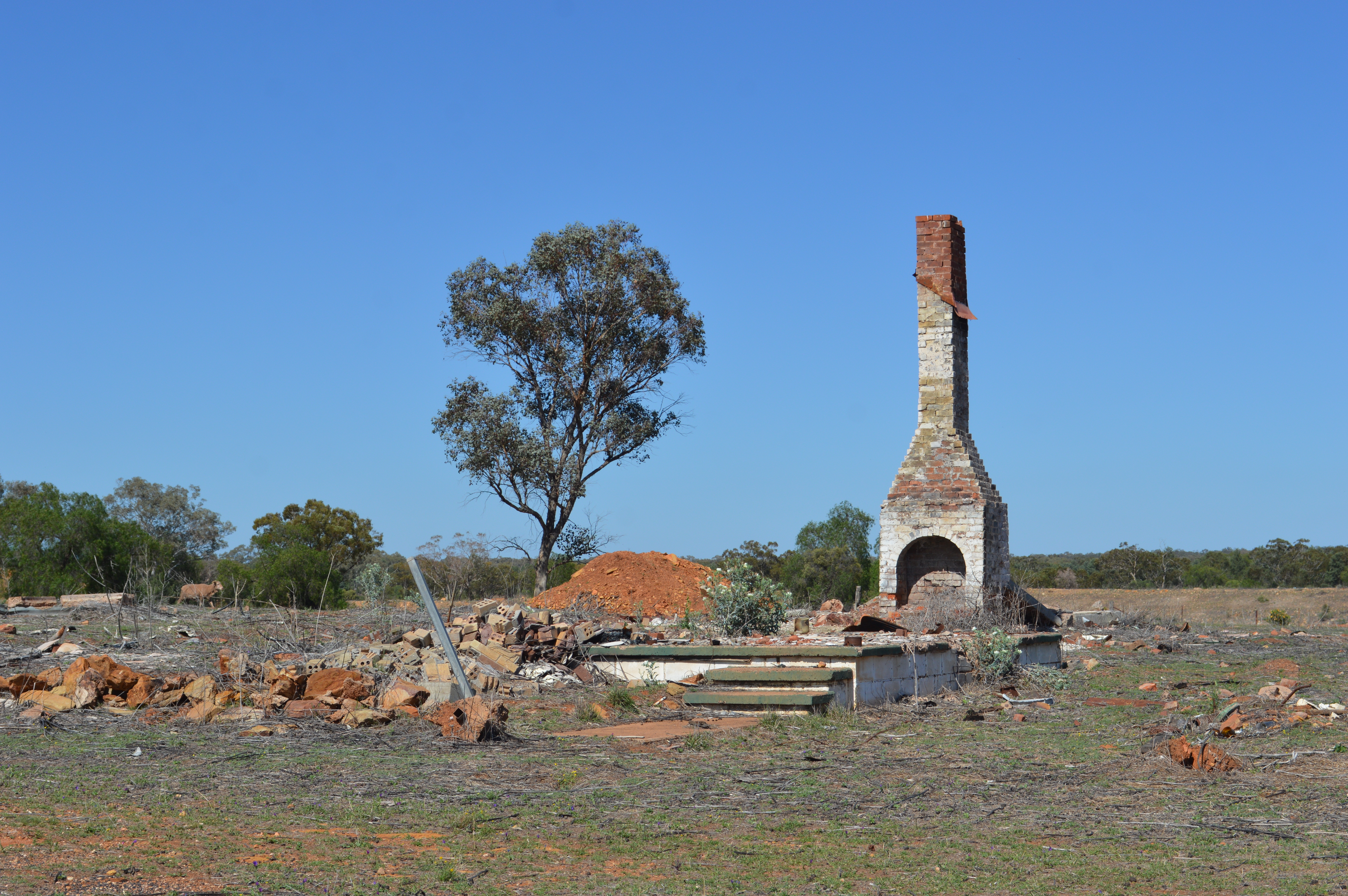
Ruined house at Canbelego (2017)

There are gravestones of those who died as a result of accidents at the Mount Boppy Mine, some who died during the devastating Spanish flu epidemic of July 1919, some who died as infants or while still young children, and some young married women of childbearing age. Some other graves are now anonymous, either having lost or never had a grave marker. Some of the anonymous graves have a small area, enclosed by fence or border, suggesting these are graves of young children. Among the anonymous graves are those of the popular miner, Herbert Corbett; the miner, band secretary and librarian, John Price; a miner killed in a rockfall in July 1905—the first to die at the Mount Boppy mine—William Quigley; and also perhaps that of the murderer, William Carroll. Also buried there are Michael 'Mick' James—last publican of Canbelego and country singer, who died in 2021—and his baby daughter.

West of the village are the remains of the mine and the open-cut pit. It is a potential source of clean water, for industrial use and watering stock, in times of drought, but more recently once again a gold mine. On an ephemeral watercourse, to the north-east of the village, is a large square dam, probably at the site of the 'Government Tank', the village's former water supply. The original 'Mine Tank' has probably long been obliterated by mining activity, but there is a dam near the south-west corner of the open cut pit.

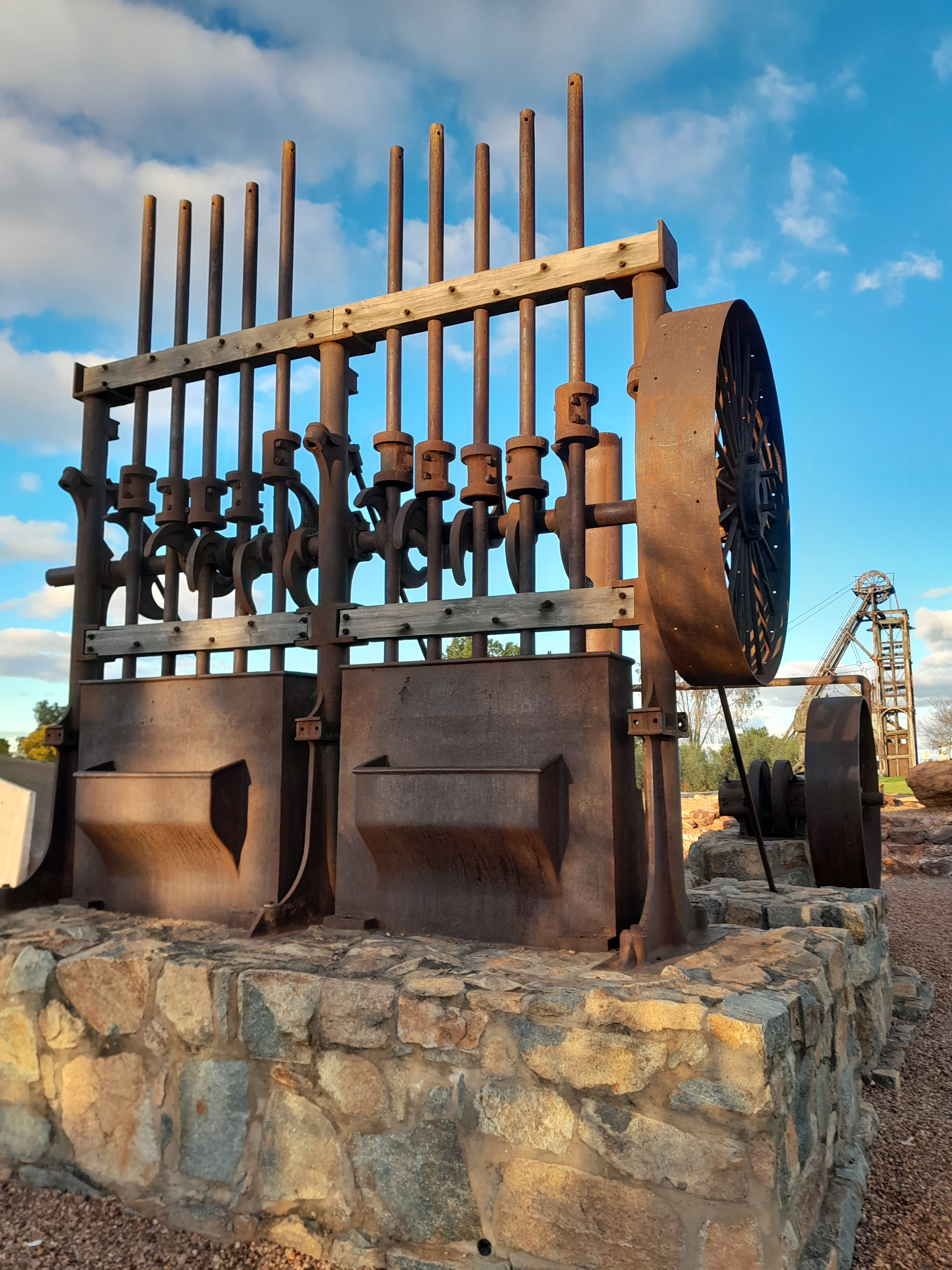
10-head stamper from Mount Boppy gold mine, at Cobar Miners' Heritage Park. There were another five similar to this one, making up the 60-head battery. (Aug 2024).

The village's First World War roll of honour is now kept at the Cobar Memorial Services Club. Another smaller roll of honour, made of marble, listing 27 names—some of which are missing from the village's roll of honour—and believed to have come from Canbelego's Methodist church, is at the Great Cobar Museum, in Cobar.

Also in Cobar, a restored stamper battery from the old Mount Boppy Gold Mine is on display at the Cobar Miners' Heritage Park. Photographs and documents relating to the village, its mines, its school, its police station, and Court of Petty Sessions are held in the N.S.W. State Archives Collection. A codd bottle from the village's soft drink maker, Robert Linton, survives; it attracted a far higher than expected price at auction in 2023.

The railway still exists but is for freight only. The station, Boppy Mountain, and its small settlement no longer exist. There is a straight row of trees north of the railway line, and the remains of the railway's excavated dam, or 'tank', lie just to the south-east. Boppy Mountain is still a stop for NSW. TrainLink road coach services. Some photographs and documents pertaining to Boppy Mountain are held in the N.S.W. State Archives Collection. Nothing remains of the railway sidings and platforms at Florida and Meryula. The road from Florida to Canbelego was known as Florida Street, and much of it still exists under that name, but the modern day road diverges from its original path, now following a straight line to meet the Barrier Highway. The access road to the modern-day Meryula homestead branches from the Barrier Highway, close to the former site of Meryula railway station.

A road provides Canbelego's connection to the Barrier Highway. Canbelego's location, off the Barrier Highway, means that it sees little passing traffic.

== See also ==
- Canbelego County
- Robinson County
