= Patrick Daley =

Australian bushranger (1844–1914)

Patrick ('Patsy') Daley
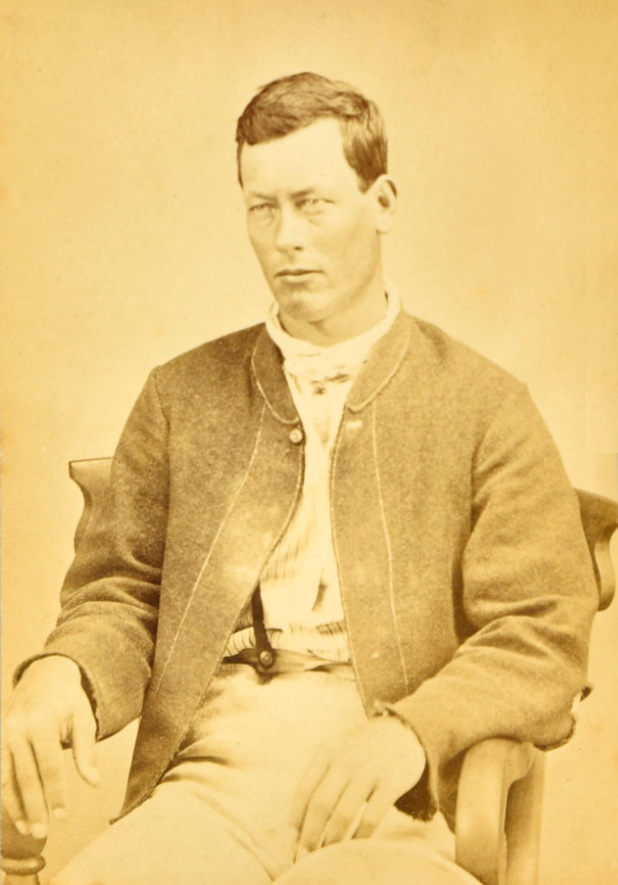
- Patrick Daley, photographed in Darlinghurst Gaol in September 1863.
- Born: Patrick Bernard Daley; 6 July 1844; Black Range, near Marengo, New South Wales
- Died: 29 April 1914, aged 69 years Glebe, New South Wales
- Resting place: Rookwood Cemetery
- Occupations: bushranger; hotel-keeper

Patrick Daley (6 July 1844 – 29 April 1914), known informally as 'Patsy' Daley, was a 19th-century Australian bushranger. Daley was the younger cousin of John O’Meally, a member of Frank Gardiner’s gang of bushrangers who robbed the gold escort near Eugowra in June 1862. By early 1863 Patsy Daley had joined with O’Meally and Ben Hall in a series of robberies carried out in the Young district. Daley was captured in March 1863 and sentenced to fifteen years hard labour. He was released in 1873. Daley married and settled in the Cobar district, becoming a successful businessman and hotel-owner.

== Biography ==
=== Early life ===
Patrick Bernard Daley was born on 6 July 1844 in the Black Range, south of Marengo, the son of John Daley and Ellen (née Downey). He was the second-born of twelve children.

Patsy Daley grew up in close proximity with his older cousin, John O'Meally. Daley and O'Meally's mothers were sisters. Their fathers operated the 'Arramagong' station in an informal partnership; with an estimated area of 26,800 acres and an estimated grazing capability of 800 cattle, the pastoral run was located at the southern foot of the Weddin Mountains in the Lachlan Squatting District. The two households lived separately on the station, about a mile and a half distant from each other. The children of both families probably received at least a rudimentary education; in September 1853 it was recorded that a schoolmaster named John Smith was living on the property.

In June 1860 John O'Meally's father, Patrick, was granted a publicans’ license for the Weddin Mount Inn, built beside Emu Creek on the 'Arramagong' run. With the gold-rush that occurred in the second half of 1860 at Lambing Flat and, nine months later, the opening up of the Lachlan goldfield at Forbes, the prospects for O’Meally's inn considerably improved, being situated on a road between the two, 25 miles from Lambing Flat and 45 miles from Forbes.

By 1861 a disagreement had arisen between Patrick O’Meally and Patsy Daley's father, John, over the leasehold of ‘Arramagong’ station. In June 1861 O’Meally placed the property, including stock and buildings, up for auction and Daley discovered the lease was held in O'Meally's name only. In July 1861 the leasehold of the 'Arramagong' run was sold for £1,370 to Patrick Throsby, a landholder near Berrima. The new owner of the station tried to evict the Daley family, which they resisted, remaining in their house until September 1863.

In 1862 Daley's cousin, John O’Meally, came under the influence of the bushranger, Frank Gardiner, who had begun armed robberies in the district and using the Weddin Mountains and the nearby Pinnacle Range as refuges. Gardiner was a frequent visitor to O’Meally's inn in the Weddin district. Whether or not Patsy Daley was involved in criminal activities at this stage is not known, but he was certainly associating with his cousin, who had already joined with Gardiner in committing robberies. In March 1862 O’Meally, Daley and another cousin (surname Downey) were apprehended on suspicion of being involved in the highway robbery of the storekeepers, Alfred Horsington and Henry Hewitt, near Wombat on 10 March 1862. O’Meally had been part of the gang led by Gardiner who carried out the robbery, but in the end the three young men were released without charge due to insufficient evidence.

John O’Meally was one of Gardiner's gang of bushrangers (eight in number) who robbed the gold escort near Eugowra in June 1862. By the end of 1862 O’Meally and several others of the gang remained at large. From early 1863 Patsy Daley, attracted to the romance and excitement of the bushranging life, began to join O’Meally and his fellow bushrangers in undertaking robberies in the Lambing Flat district.

=== Bushranging ===
Early evening on 28 January 1863 three armed men forcibly entered the house of Henry Colley at 'Demondrille' station near Murrumburrah. They stole a number of firearms and ammunition, jewellery, a watch, clothing and a saddle and bridle. Patsy Daley was later identified as one of the three who robbed Colley.

At eight o'clock in the evening of 2 February 1863 five armed men entered George Dickenson's store at Spring Creek near Young and stuck-up Dickenson, his storekeeper and a customer. The men were recognised as John Gilbert, Patsy Daley, John O’Meally and Christie Boland (alias Purtell). The fifth man was believed to be Ben Hall. The three detainees were taken outside and guarded at gunpoint by Daley while the other bushrangers searched the store. As others passed by they were detained as well. It was reported that Daley was "very nervous and trembled like a leaf"; noticing his unease several of the captives pressed forward at which point Hall intervened and warned them to stay back. After searching the store the bushrangers departed with £5 in silver, an estimated £10 worth of gold-dust, a revolver, three watches, several pairs of boots and a quantity of clothing. As they were leaving an unarmed policeman in plain clothes, Constable David Stewart, came along. The bushrangers ordered him off his horse. The policeman resisted and he was pulled off, and his horse, saddle and bridle were taken.

On Saturday morning, 7 February 1863, Ben Hall and Patsy Daley broke into the unattended Pinnacle Police Station and stole a rifle, a carbine, ammunition, a pair of saddlebags and a bridle, and articles of clothing. The station was usually occupied by three troopers. Two of the policemen, including the officer in charge, had been required to go to Forbes and the third, Constable Knox, was absent from the premises (despite being instructed "not to leave his post"). When Knox returned later that day, he began following the tracks of the robbers. The following day Trooper William Hollister and two Aboriginal trackers, Billy Dargin and Prince Charlie, arrived from Forbes. They sent Knox back to the station and resumed following the tracks. Hollister and the trackers caught up with Hall and Daley as they were departing from Allport's inn on the Forbes Road, close to the ‘Pinnacle’ station. They gave chase, but after several miles the pursuit was abandoned when Hollister's horse ran against a tree and the trooper was thrown to the ground. During the chase Daley had fired three shots at Tracker Charlie. After the Pinnacle police station robbery Knox was dismissed from the police force.

Mid-afternoon on Saturday, 21 February 1863, four armed bushrangers dressed "in the style of policemen in private clothes" rode up to Meyer Solomon's store at Little Wombat. They were Ben Hall, John Gilbert, John O'Meally and Patsy Daley. Solomon's heavily pregnant wife observed the men approaching and informed her husband, who reached for a musket. Meeting them at the door Solomon fired his musket, the ball grazing the neck of one of the bushrangers "and tearing the collar of his coat". The intruders responded by firing two shots in return. Solomon escaped through the back of the premises; he was pursued by two of the men, captured and brought back to the store and placed under guard with his wife and a young lad, George Johnstone, in Solomon's employment. The bushrangers then proceeded to ransack the store in "cool, deliberate manner", loading three pack-horses with goods before departing at about seven o’clock in the evening. The following morning the police tracked the bushrangers for about ten miles in the direction of the Weddin Mountains, but gave up the pursuit "from the want of a tracker and exhaustion, as most of the police had just returned from Yass".

=== The detainment of Sub-Inspector Norton ===
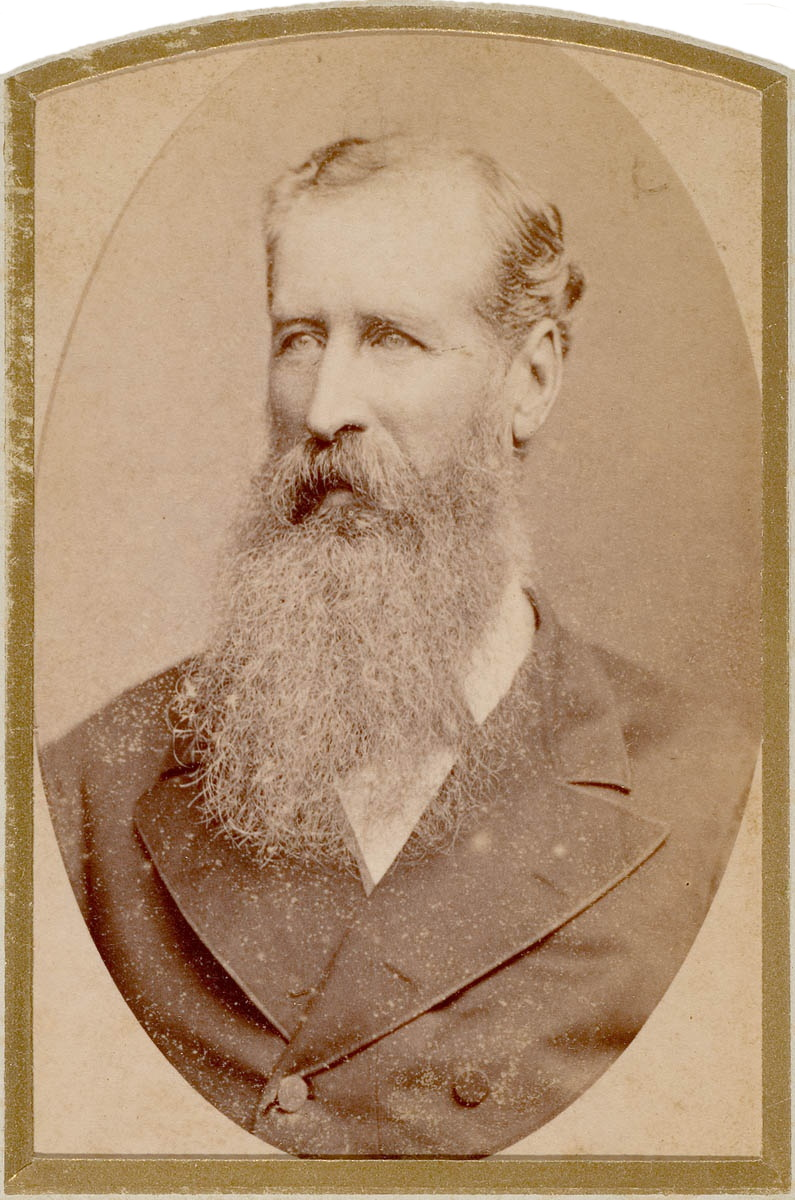
John Oxley Norton (1827–1880), police sub-inspector at Forbes in 1863.

By late February 1863 Sub-Inspector John Norton was given charge of the police at Forbes. On 28 February 1863 Norton and Tracker Billy Dargin were on patrol in pursuit of the bushrangers Hall, O'Meally and Daley; they had arranged to meet ten police troopers at the foot of Wheogo Mountain, north-west of Grenfell, but through a misunderstanding the meeting did not eventuate. Norton and Dargin continued the pursuit and the next morning, March 1, while riding towards 'Pinnacle' station they came upon the camp of the three bushrangers, who immediately mounted their horses and spread out on either side of the road in an effort to encircle Norton and Dargin. O'Meally advanced to within 80 to 100 yards and fired two shots at Norton from a double-barrelled gun. The bushrangers pushed forward to within fifty yards, exchanging shots with Norton, with none taking effect. When the policeman's ammunition was expended Daley, "armed with three revolvers and a pair of pistols", rode up to him and told him to throw down his arms. During the shooting Dargin had dismounted and escaped on foot into the bush, with several shots fired after him. Norton claimed that after his surrender "Hall rode up and fired point blank at him, but fortunately without effect". While O'Meally guarded the prisoner, Hall and Daley started in pursuit of the tracker, without success.

When Hall and Daley returned to their prisoner, it was found that Norton had been mistaken for Trooper Hollister who, it was claimed, "had threatened to shoot Ben Hall". After being confined for three hours Norton was allowed to depart with the police horses. The writer for the Lachlan Observer newspaper (Forbes) considered that the Sub-Inspector owed his release "to his being a 'new chum' in the district, and the fact of his having a wife and family in Sydney". After his escape the tracker Dargin made his way to the Pinnacle police station where he reported the events. Sub-Inspector Norton arrived back at Forbes on March 3.

=== Capture ===
On Wednesday morning, 11 March 1863, a party of four mounted police, accompanied by Aboriginal tracker Billy Dargin and led by Inspector Pottinger, were in the vicinity of the Weddin Mountains. Dargin noticed the fresh prints of a horse crossing the tracks they were pursuing and Pottinger decided to follow the more recent set of tracks. After a while, nearby to Pinnacle (or Macquire's) Reef, the rider (Patsy Daley) was seen in the distance. Pottinger ordered two of the troopers to circle the hill in the opposite direction to try to intercept the man and the remainder of the group set off in direct pursuit. Before long they came upon some huts, with a saddled horse tethered to one of the buildings. Pottinger recognised the horse as one he had seen "all in a sweat" in Ben Hall's paddock the night before and Dargin identified the pair of girth straps on the horse as being stolen from the police barracks on 'Pinnacle' station. The men inside the huts were at first "unwilling to answer" Pottinger's questions, but after "he threatened them" the Police Inspector was told the rider was down a shaft on the diggings. At the entrance to the shaft Pottinger called on the man to surrender, but received no answer. Eventually, after calling for his surrender several times, Pottinger threatened that he would "burn and smoke him out like an opossum", which prompted Daley to surrender. He climbed the ladder of the sixty-foot shaft and was taken into custody, identified by Dargin as one of those who had fired at Norton and himself ten days previously. Patsy Daley was described as "a mild, youthful, whiskerless looking person, with light blue eyes and fair complexion", with nothing in his outward "physiognomical expression to denote the degraded villain".

The following day Daley was brought before the Police Court at Forbes charged with shooting at Sub-Inspector Norton with the intent to kill or do grievous bodily harm as well as the robbery of the police barracks on ‘Pinnacle’ station. After evidence from Pottinger regarding his capture, Daley was remanded in custody.

On 2 April 1863 Daley was taken under guard by coach to Young and lodged in the lock-up there. The next day George Dickenson, the storekeeper of Spring Creek, was asked to identify the man who had stuck up his store several weeks previously. Daley was immediately recognised by Dickenson from amongst eight other prisoners. Daley was also identified by Henry Colley of 'Demondrille' station, who was robbed by three men in late January.

=== Trial and imprisonment ===
Patrick Daley was tried in the Goulburn Assizes on 23 September 1863 before Chief Justice Alfred Stephen, charged with the armed robbery and assault of George Dickenson on 2 February at Spring Creek in company with "other persons unknown". Daley pleaded not guilty; his defence (undertaken by the barrister William Windeyer) relied on a technical point that during the robbery Dickenson was being held at gunpoint outside the premises and so the circumstances "only amounted to stealing from a dwelling". However, Justice Stephens instructed the jury that Dickenson was "constructively present" during the robbery and the jury, without leaving the box, returned a verdict of guilty. Daley received a sentence of ten years hard labour on the roads (or other public works of the colony), the first year to be held in irons. On the following day Daley again faced the court, charged with the robbery of Meyer Solomon at Wombat on 21 February 1863. This time Daley pleaded guilty and his sentence was deferred. The following day, February 25, Daley was brought before the Chief Justice and received a total sentence of fifteen years hard labour on the roads (thereby adding five years to his previous sentence).

Daley was initially sent to Darlinghurst Gaol, but by February 1864 he had been transferred to the Cockatoo Island Penal Establishment. He was finally discharged on 15 October 1873 upon receiving a remittance of his sentence.

=== Later years ===
Patrick Daley and Mary Kelly were married in on 24 November 1883 at Hay, in the western Riverina district. The couple had two daughters, the first of them born in 1887 at Mossgiel. They eventually moved to the Cobar district, in the central west of New South Wales, where Daley's wife's family owned the 'Booroomugga' and 'Sussex' pastoral runs. From April 1895 Patrick Daley was the successful tenderer of a five-year lease of the Booroomugga Tank, a public watering place, east of Cobar on the road to Nyngan.

From 1899 the Family Hotel at Wrightville, near Cobar, was being run by the publican, William J. Kelly; Patrick Daley possibly owned the hotel.

In July 1904 Daley was elected as an alderman of the Wrightville Municipal Council. In 1905 Daley was referred to as the Cobar-Wrightville mail contractor.

By about 1906 Daley owned the Royal Hotel at Illewong, about 11 miles south-east of Cobar, with his younger brother William (born in 1861) as the licensee. Daley's hotel at Illewong was destroyed by fire in March 1910.

In January 1911 Daley purchased the Terminus Hotel, on the corner of Linsley and Bradley streets in Cobar.

Patrick Daley died on 29 April 1914 at his sister's residence in Glebe. Daley had been in ill-health "for some months", being treated at the Cobar Hospital and later in Sydney. He was buried in Rookwood cemetery. In his will Daley left an estate of over six thousand pounds. He left the Family Hotel at Wrightville and mining shares to his brother William, cottages to his two daughters, and the remainder to his wife.

In 1915 Daley's widow, Mary Daley, married Patrick Daley's younger brother William at Cobar. William and Mary Daley purchased the Sunbeam Hotel in Surrey Hills. Mary Daley died in August 1922 of cancer and was buried in the Rookwood cemetery with her first husband.

== See also ==
- Frank Gardiner–Ben Hall gang
