= Wrightville =

Mining village in New South Wales, Australia

Coordinates: 31°31′44″S 145°51′31.9″E

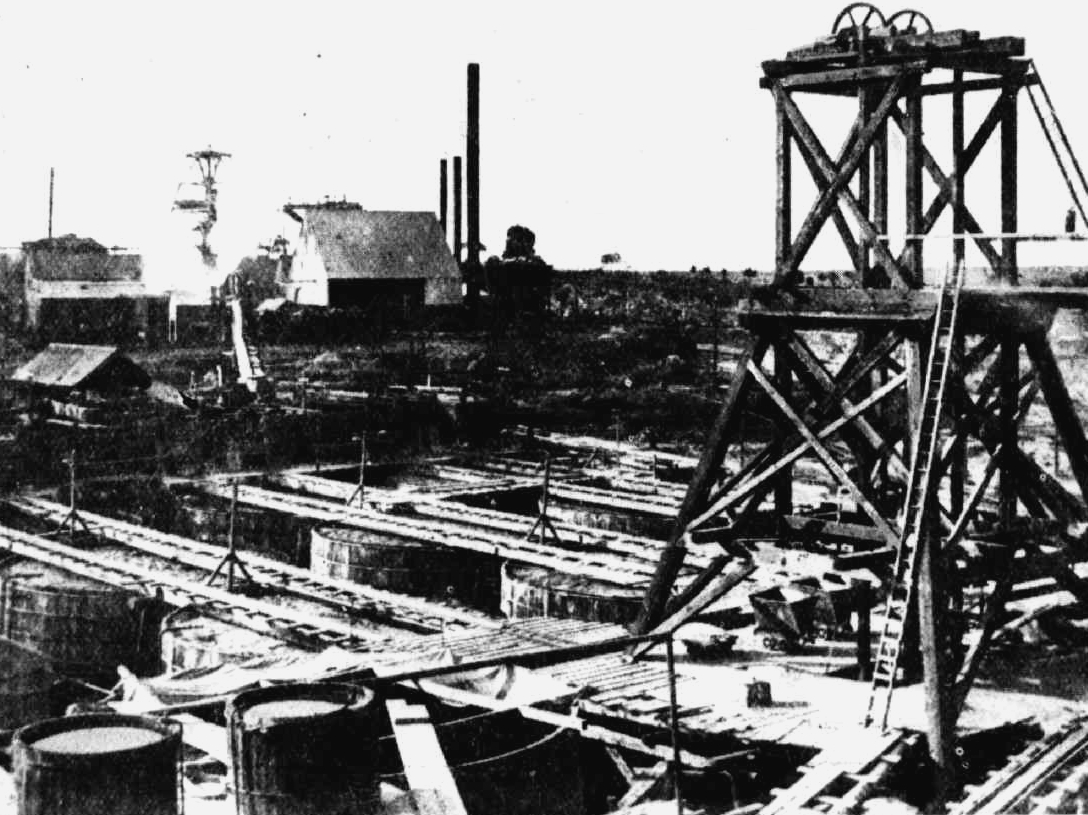
The Occidental Mine (c.1911), the main source of Wrightville's prosperity.

Wrightville was a mining village in the Orana region of New South Wales, Australia. Once it was a significant settlement, with its own municipal government, public school, convent school, post office, police station, four hotels, and railway connection. At its peak, around 1907, its population probably reached 2,000 people. Its site and that of the adjacent former village of Dapville are now an uninhabited part of Cobar.

== Location ==
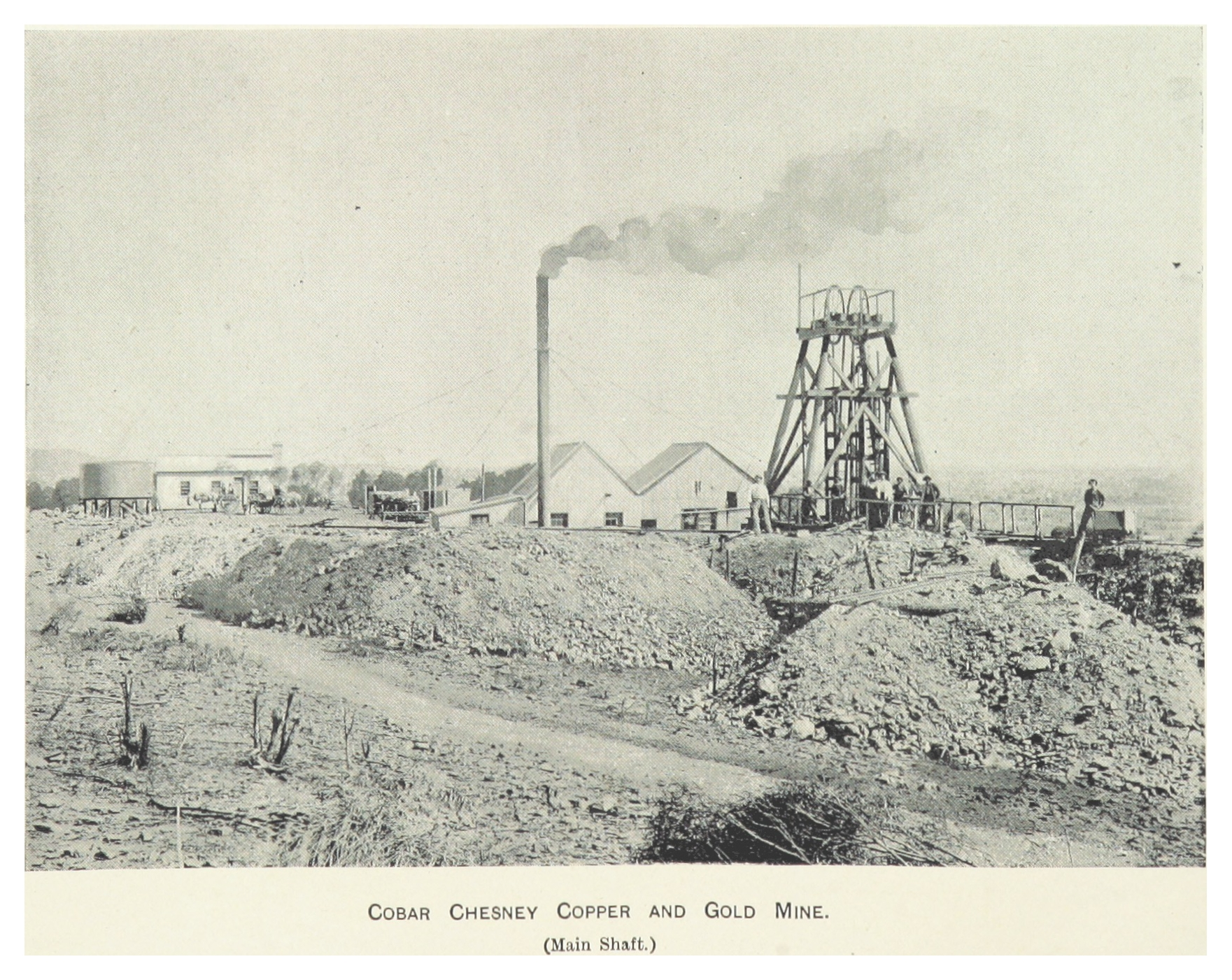
Chesney Mine c.1899 (Carne)

Wrightville was located on the road to Hillston, about four kilometers south-east of Cobar. This road is now known as Kidman Way. The northernmost part of the village straddled the main road to Hillston, but the bulk of Wrightville lay to the south and west of that main road. The branch railway, after it turned south from the road to Hillston, ran just outside the eastern edge of the village.

On the eastern edge of the village, toward its southern end, was the Occidental Gold Mine (later the New Occidental Gold Mine), and to the village's north-east, the Chesney Mine. Less well known mines in the area were the Gladstone Mine (a copper mine, opened c.1909), in the north-west of the village, Mount Pleasant Mine, just east of the village, and the Young Australian Mine, also just east of the village but a little further south. The irregular shape of the village's ground plan was defined, in a large part, by the presence of these five mine sites, which constrained where the village could be located.

The area of the neighbouring village of Dapville lay to Wrightville's north, on both sides of the Hillston road. Dapville was bounded, in the north and north-west by mining lands of the Great Cobar mine, and to the east by Fort Bourke Hill and the Cobar Gold Mine, continuing south towards the Chesney Mine. At its southern end, Dapville adjoined Wrightville, and the Hillston road passed through both villages.

== History ==
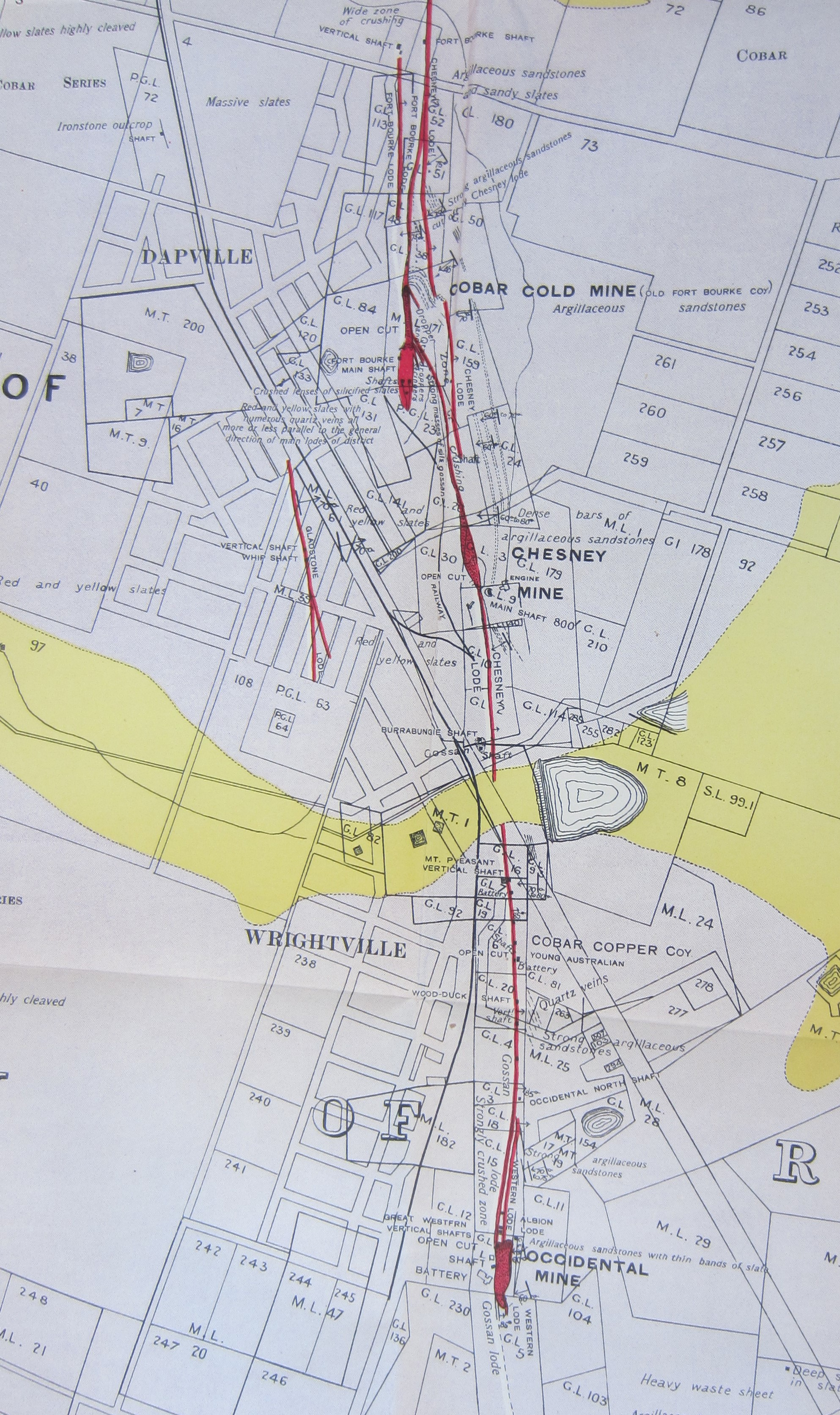
Wrightville, Dapville and adjacent mines, also showing railway c.1911 (National Library of Australia).

=== Aboriginal occupation ===
The area that later became Wrightville lies within the traditional lands of Wangaaypuwan dialect speakers (also known as Wangaibon) of Ngiyampaa people, referred to in their own language as Ngiyampaa Wangaaypuwan. The local people collected pigments from mineral outcrops on Fort Bourke Hill, near the future site of Dapville, the adjacent village to Wrightville.

=== Mining village ===
The Cobar area is most commonly associated with copper mining, but a line of mines, which were primarily for gold, stretch way from the town to its south, from Fort Bourke Hill to as far as just beyond a landform known as 'The Peak'. Although it would later become a copper mine, the first of these gold mines was the Chesney Mine, opened in 1887. The Occidental Mine was working by mid-1889. These gold mines gave rise to Wrightville and its neighbouring village Dapville, which seems to have been largely a suburb of Wrightville.

In the days before motorised road transport, miners had to live close to their work, and it is likely that some form of informal settlement began to take shape close to the mines. By 1892, the Occidental Mine was described as the "leading mine on the field," and it was clear that it was going to have a relatively long and productive life.

The Village of Wrightville was proclaimed on 27 November 1895, and allotments in the village were on sale by December 1897. The new village began life at a time when Cobar, a mere 4 km away, was in decline following the slowdown of copper mining there. Initially, the new village grew quickly; its population was around 800, in 1898, reached 1,242 by 1901, and around 1,500 by 1903.

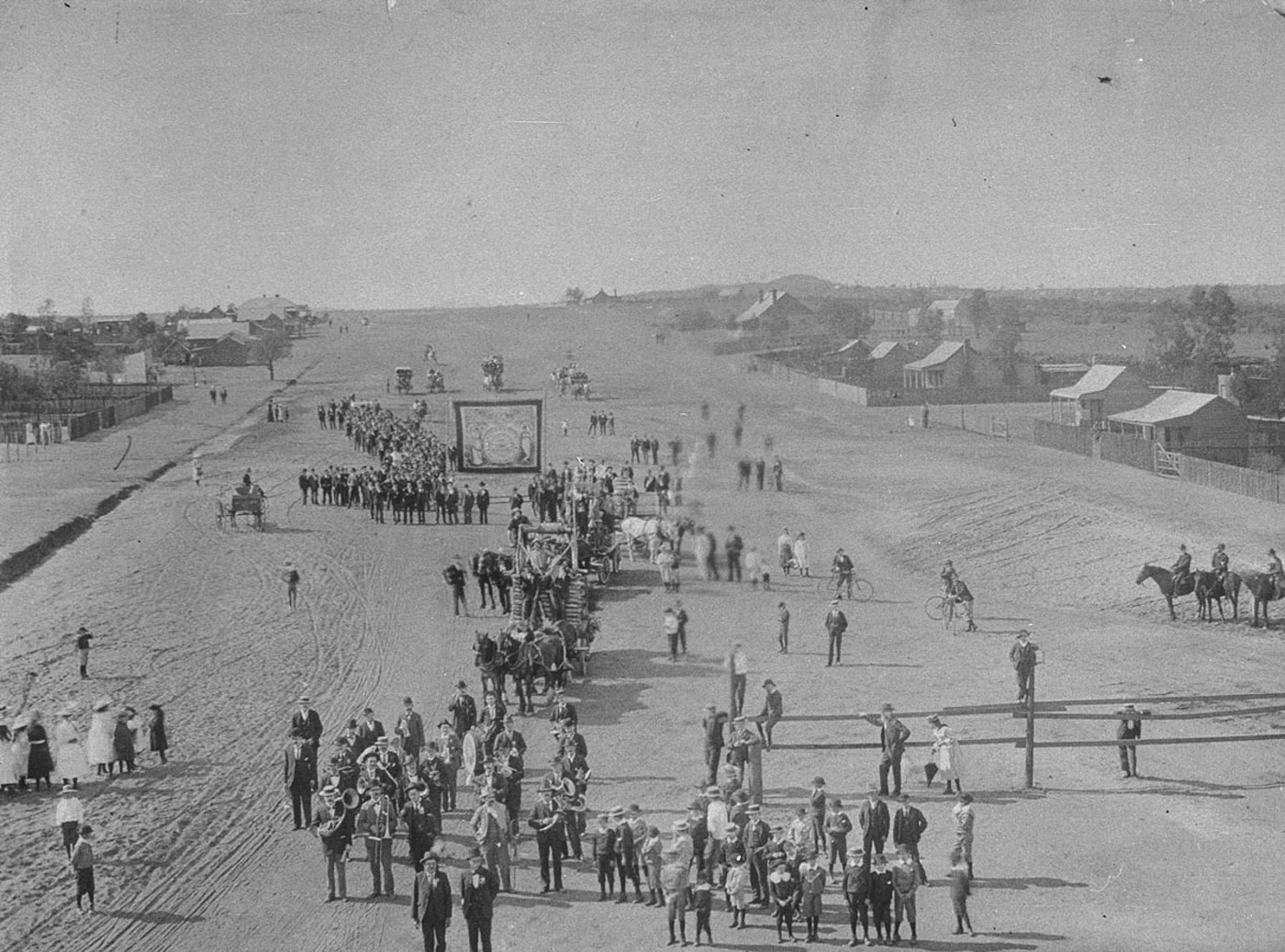
Eight hour day procession, in Hunt Street, Wrightville, 1 Oct. 1900 (State Library of NSW)

One reported explanation of the village's name is that Wrightville was named after Jabez Wright (1852-1922). He was a carpenter, undertaker, trade union official and Labor alderman of Broken Hill, later its mayor and, from 1913, a colourful and somewhat eccentric Labor member of the NSW Legislative Assembly. However, Jabez Wright did not have much to do with the Cobar district, until he became a parliamentarian and represented the area, and that was many years after the village had been named. A more likely explanation is that the village was named after another 'J. Wright', Joseph Wright, proprietor of Wright's Cobar Hotel and a mining entrepreneur. Joseph Wright was one of three men who had pegged a claim, in 1876, over the area that became the Occidental Mine. He was a director of the Chesney Mine and took out mining leases over what became the Albion Mine, later the north portion of the area combined into the Occidental Mine. The Albion struck a rich lode early in 1895. Wrightville was virtually a company town for the surrounding mines, the two largest being the Occidental and the Chesney, so naming the village after Joseph Wright seems more probable.

The population probably peaked, possibly reaching around 2000, in 1907. However, by mid 1909, it was reported that the population was "decreasing, and instead of being as a few years ago a thriving and busy centre, we are now simply a struggling village, with little or no hope of a future return to prosperity. Then how are we, a mere handful of rate-payers, going to maintain a costly sanitary system?" This was in regard to epidemics of infectious disease, which were a part of life in mining towns at the time.

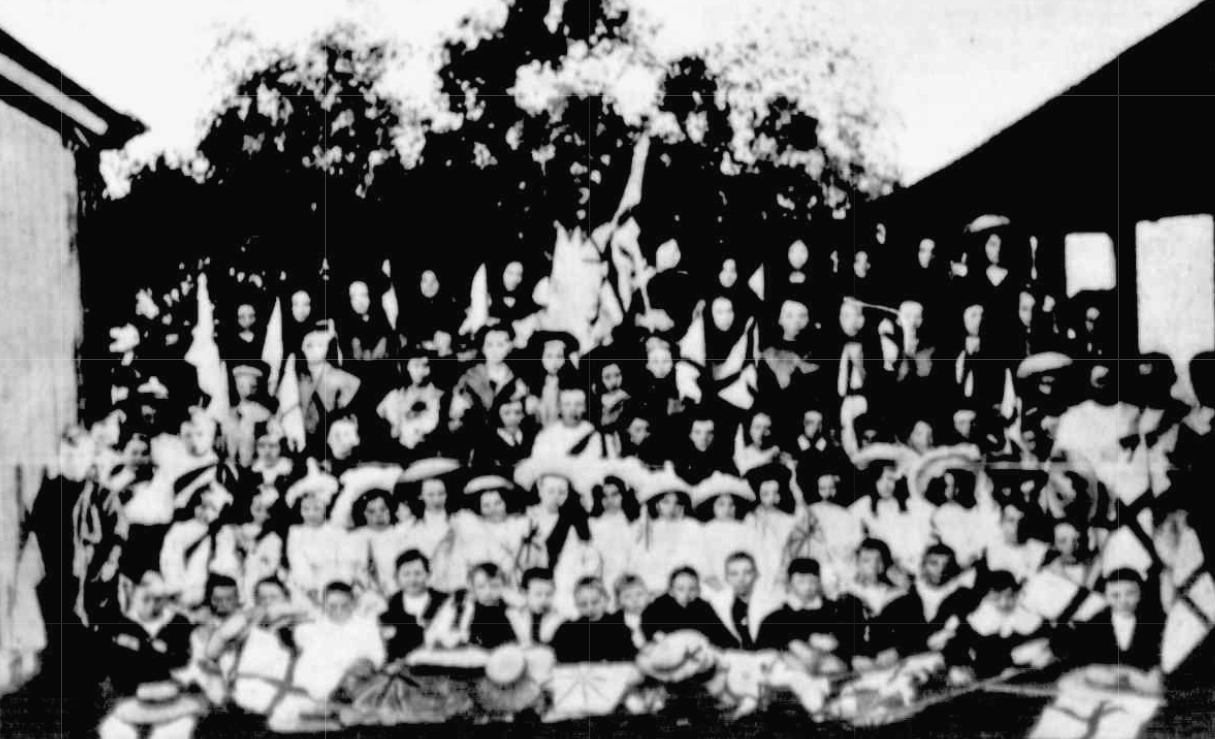
Children of Wrightville Public School dressed in national costumes, for a visit to their school by the Governor of New South Wales, Sir Harry Rawson, on 22 May 1907. There were also 111 children at the village's convent school, in 1906.

In 1911, the village had a population of 1,568. It had four hotels Tattersall's Hotel, destroyed by fire in 1903 but rebuilt, the Family Hotel, the Young Australia Hotel, and the Chesney Hotel.

The village had a public school, specified to be erected "on a site midway between Wrightville and The Peak", from May 1897; it was expanded in 1899. There was also a Catholic convent school, St. Columba's School, run by the Sisters of Mercy, from February 1905. The sisters lived in Cobar and rode to and from the convent school each day by horse-drawn omnibus.

Wrightville had Catholic (St. Columba's), Anglican, and Methodist churches. In 1912, Presbyterian church services were held in a hall that was also used for other purposes, including boxing matches. It had a St John's Ambulance brigade, with a bicycle ambulance in 1904. From late 1913, the village had the 'Wrightville Picture Company' showing motion pictures. There was also a town band. In late 1909, a soda fountain was open for business.

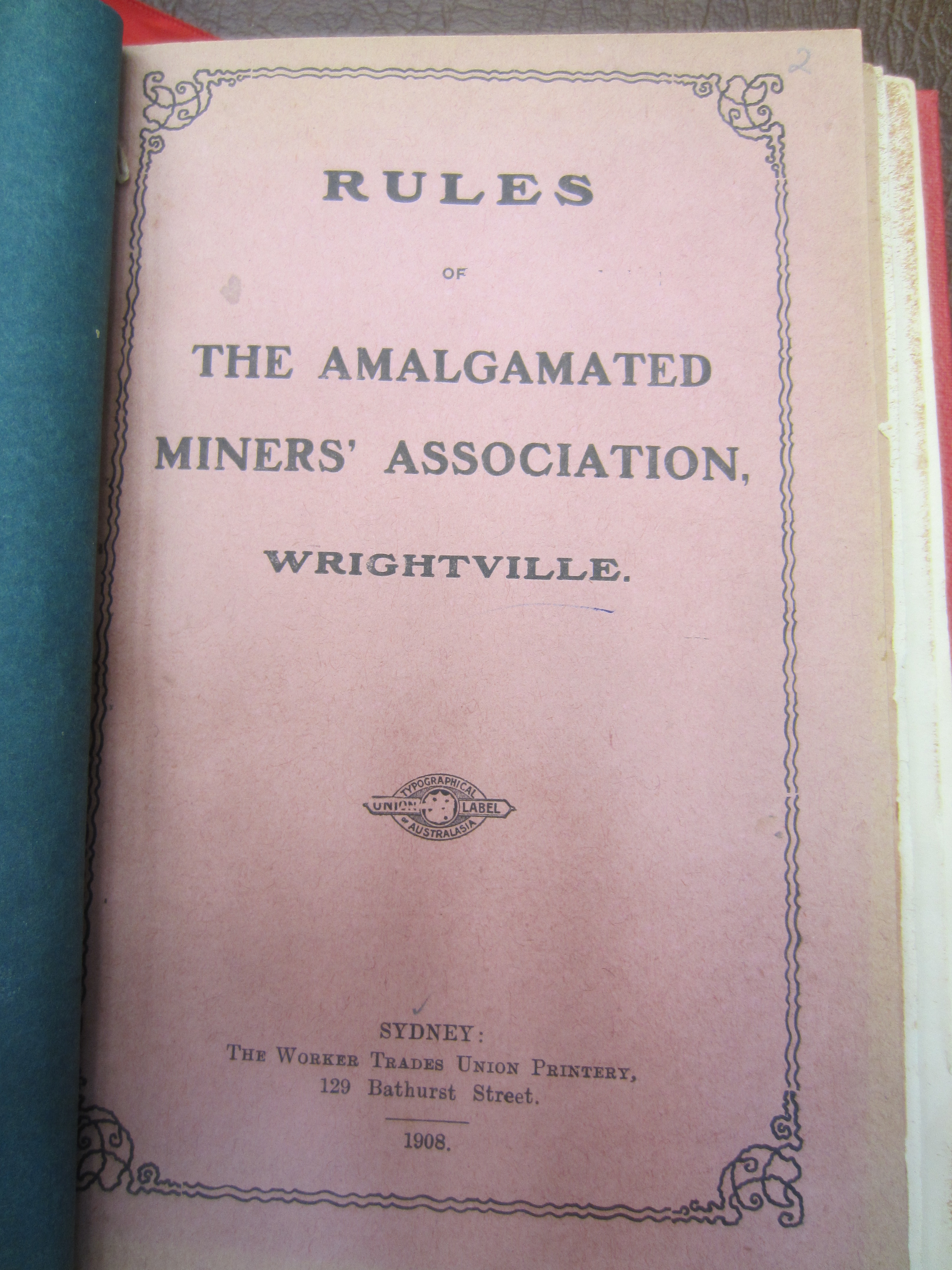
Rule book of the Amalgamated Miners' Association Wrightville.

The village had its own branch of the Amalgamated Miners' Association, a trade union representing mine workers, which had a 'Benefits Section' to financially aid families of members who had been injured or killed at work. Mining was a dangerous occupation; the accident rate for Cobar district miners, in 1912, was 109.3 accidents per 1,000 workers. There were fatal accidents at the Occidental Mine in 1896, 1901, 1904, and 1913, resulting in a total of at least five deaths at the mine; all those fatal accidents involved blasting work in the open cut section of the mine. The Chesney mine had fatalities in 1898, 1906, 1908, and 1916, resulting in a total of at least five deaths at the mine. Accident victims who survived were sometimes left with life-altering injuries.

In keeping with the then widely-prevailing racism within the labour movement and the 'White Australia policy', the union branch rules specifically excluded from its membership,"Asiatics and other coloured aliens" but, in a somewhat more progressive stance, added a qualification that, "This [exclusion from membership] shall not apply to Aborigines, Maoris, American Negroes, or children of mixed marriages born in Australasia".

The main road through the village, Hunt Street, was a wide thoroughfare. Other streets of the village were Albion, Dan, Chesney, Kenane, Meryula, Peak, Ryan, William, Cobar, Occidental, Pleasant, and Young streets, and West and East parades.

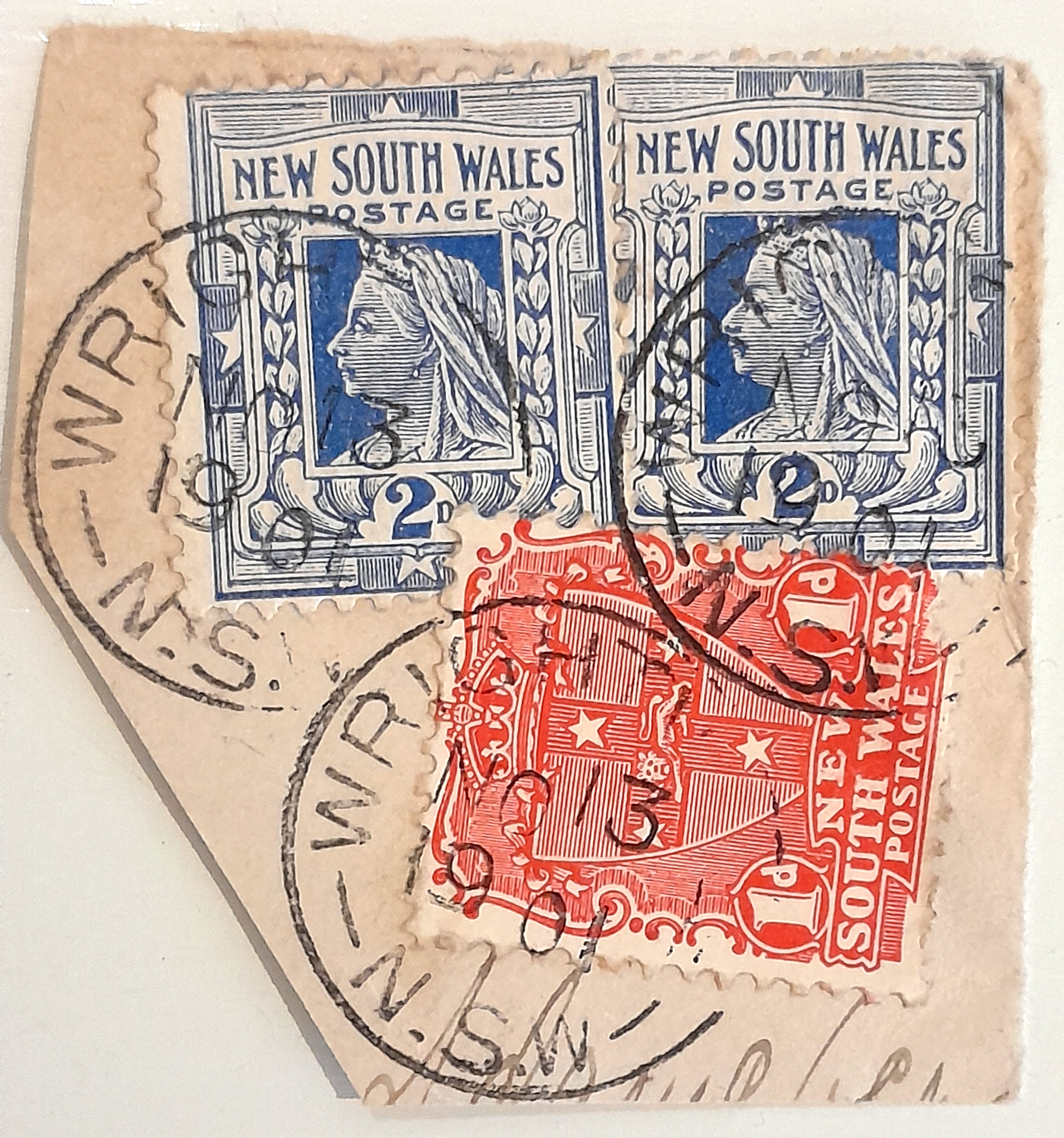
Postmark of Wrightville Post Office (13 November 1901)

The miners' houses in the village, typically, were simple structures constructed of inexpensive and readily-available materials. The village had a police station. The police presence in Wrightville in 1912 was only one constable, in 1912. It had a post office, from 1897.

Building fires were a part of life in the village; once lit there was little that could be done to extinguish such a fire. A fire preceded the spectacular explosion of the explosives magazine at the Great Cobar Mine, on 25 January 1908. A fire at the post office, in 1901, was alleged to have been a deliberate attempt to cover embezzlement by the postmaster. Some boys of the village were involved in dangerous behaviour and vandalism.

From October 1901 to September 1931, Wrightville had a railway connection, The Peak branch railway line, which despite its name—officially Cobar to Peak railway—and the original plan, never extended to The Peak. It ran from a junction on the Cobar railway line, just east of Cobar, to a siding at the Occidental Mine. On its way toward Wrightville, the line had two separate sidings, for the Great Cobar and Chesney mines. The railway ran down the main road of the village, Hunt Street, before curving away to the south, then forming the eastern edge of the village, to reach the mine. There was a freight loading location and goods shed near the Mount Pleasant mine site—sometimes called 'Mount Pleasant' and sometimes 'Wrightville'—not far from where the line left the main road; it was used by Wrightville, as well as mines and further along the main road, such as at The Peak and Illewong. There was some talk of an extension of the railway from Wrightville to Nymagee, via Illewong and Shuttleton, but it would never be built.

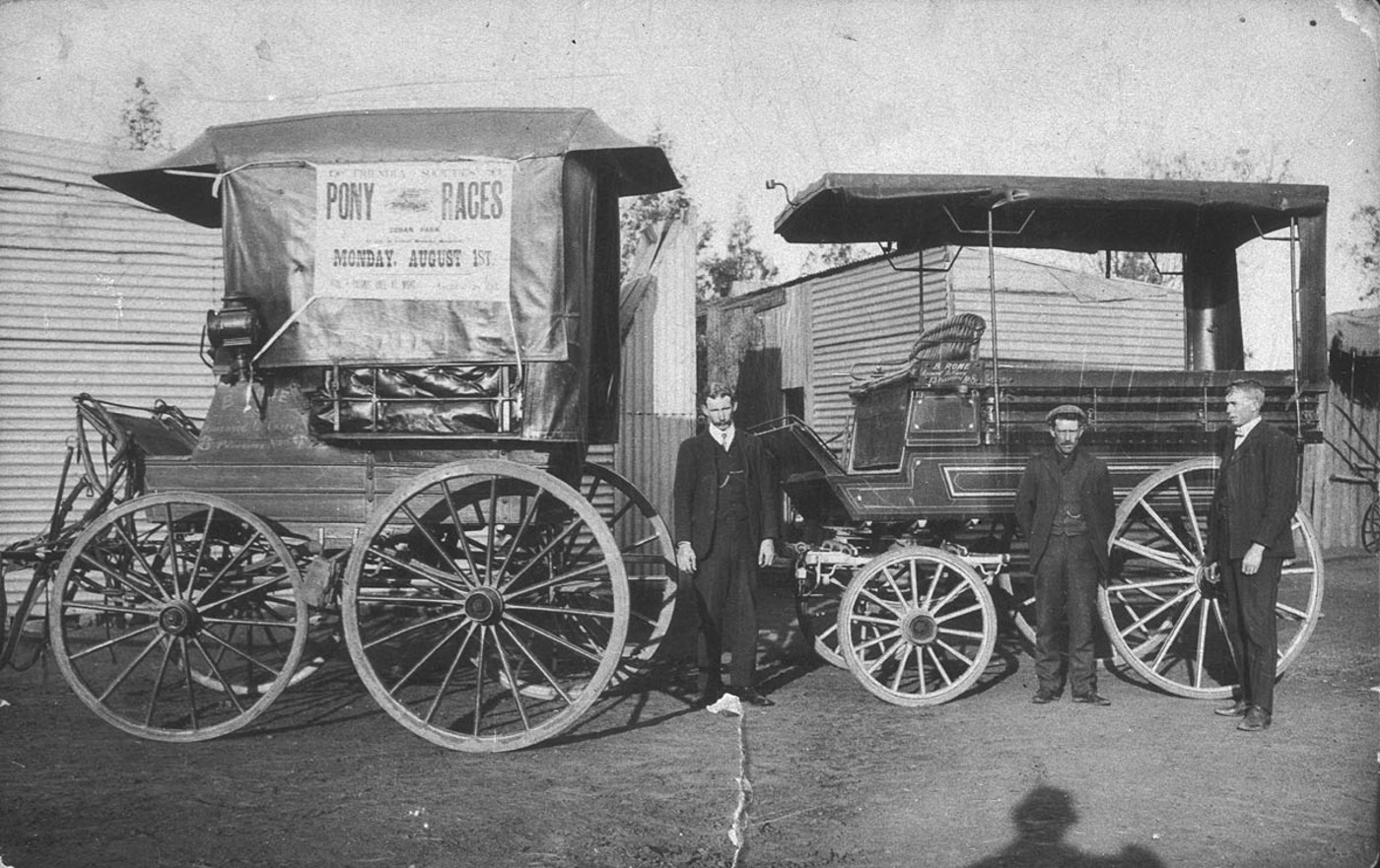
'Bert' Rowe's Wrightville-Cobar omnibuses (1910)

The village had no passenger rail service—Wrightville residents' hopes for a railway station in the centre of the village were never realised—but it did have an omnibus service to Cobar. People, on occasion, did hitch a ride on freight trains. Operation of the railway through the village's main street was hazardous. On 8 April 1913, as a horse-drawn omnibus crossed the railway line, a train emerged from a cutting that led to the Chesney Mine and struck the horses, killing them and the bus driver. The passengers on the omnibus all survived.

The water supply for the village, in a semi-arid area, was an important issue, from the earliest days of the village. In 1914, the village had a population of 1,400, and water was fed to a stand pipe in the village, in limited quantity, from Cobar; the village could not bear the cost of installing a reticulated water supply connected to the larger Cobar water supply network. The water supply remained a constant issue, with the village's householders primarily reliant upon their own rainwater tanks, and Wrightville's communal 'tank', a small dam which captured rainwater.

Especially in times of drought, the precarious water supply and inadequate sanitation led to serious outbreaks of typhoid fever. Droughts also affected operation of the mines, which consumed large amounts of water, leading to serious unemployment in the area, during the Federation Drought.

Paradoxically, there was a continuously flowing watercourse through the village. Its source was the mine water pumps of the Chesney Mine. A footbridge was built across it, in 1912, at the eastern end of Occidental Street, so that children going to the public school did not need to wade through it or walk along the railway to cross it. In 1907, mine water, from the dewatering of the Mount Pleasant and Young Australia mines, had flowed over the village's cricket oval and the part of the village near to the Occidental mine. Unfortunately, mine water was unsuitable for human consumption, but the dam, or 'tank', of the Chesney mine did serve as the venue of a swimming carnival in 1921.

On 25 April 1916, the village celebrated 'Anzac Night', a first commemoration of the ANZAC landing at Gallipoli a year earlier. At least thirteen men from the village had gone to war, by mid 1916, and more recruits were sought. Soon after the war's end, in July-August 1919, the village was struck by the Spanish influenza pandemic, during the second and more lethal wave of the pandemic in Australia. It may have experienced a relatively mild strain of the disease. For whatever reason, Wrightville seems not to have been badly impacted, which was in stark contrast to another mining settlement in the region, Canbelego, where the outcome was devastating.

A prominent early resident of Wrightville was reformed bushranger, Patrick Daley (1844-1914). He was a cousin of the bushranger, John O'Meally, and one of the few survivors of the Gardiner-Hall gang. Most of the others, including O'Meally, met violent deaths, or were hanged, by the end of 1865. Daly had been sentenced to fifteen years in prison, with hard labour, for his crimes, in 1863. He received a remission of his sentence and was released early, in 1873. In 1882, he married Mary Kelly, and subsequently came to the Cobar district, where her family were landholders. After Wrightville was established, he settled there. He worked as a mail contractor, he owned the Family Hotel, and, in 1904, was elected as an alderman of the municipality. Upon his death, in 1914, he left an estate valued at around £6,000, consisting of hotels, mining shares and cottages.

=== Municipality ===
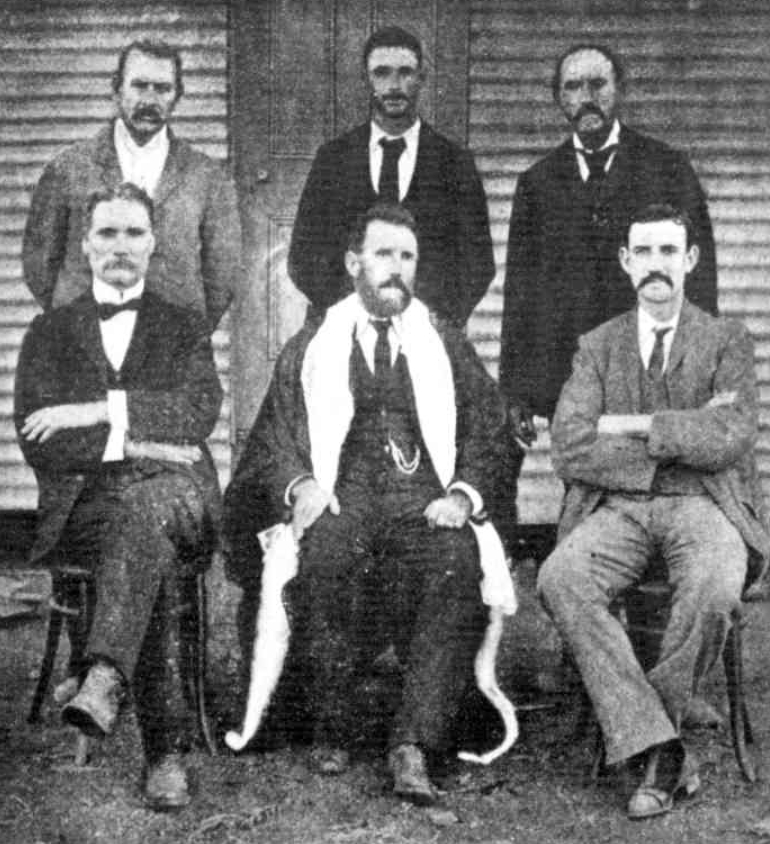
Mayor and aldermen of Wrightville (1901)

Originally, Wrightville was a part of Cobar Municipality, but a petition for separation of a new municipality was made on 31 December 1898. It became a separate municipality, in November 1899. Its municipal government was known, from 1899 to 1902, as the Gladstone Municipal Council, and, after 1902, as the Wrightville Municipal Council. The petition was for a municipality of four square miles in area, but it came to comprise an area of 5,600 acres (8.75 square miles), including Wrightville, the neighbouring village of Dapville (proclaimed in November 1896), and a number of mine sites. As one of the smallest municipalities in New South Wales, its council was limited to six elected aldermen.

Proximity to Cobar and the shared history of their two municipalities, led to many instances of disagreement and petty rivalry between Wrightville's council and the council of the larger town, as well as pragmatic cooperation at times.

=== Decline (1919-1933) ===
Wrightville's prosperity was tied to mining, and to the Occidental Mine in particular. A severe drought in 1920 had led to temporary closures of some mines. However, the end of mining at the Occidental Mine, in 1921, was sudden and unexpected.

The Occidental Mine had closed in mid-1919, for what was thought to be a temporary cessation of mining. In 1920, the mine had been bought by a new company, Occidental Consolidation N.L., which had plans to upgrade it. The year 1921 had begun with a protracted strike at the mine. A settlement was reached, and soon a costly new grinding plant—using Cornish rolls to replace the more traditional stamper batteries—was in operation. The results were very disappointing, affecting the financial position of the new mining company. The mine closed in July 1921, even though it was believed to still contain a large amount of gold. It was not a shortage of gold-bearing ore that led to the mine's closure, but the ineffectiveness of the new process, and the exhaustion of its owner's capital.

Once out of operation, the mine began to fill with groundwater, and reopening—even just properly assessing the mine—would incur the additional cost of dewatering. In July 1922, the operators of the Mount Boppy Gold Mine—itself in the process of closing by then—decided not to take up the option that they held over the Occidental Mine. That the capable management of the well-known Mount Boppy company had declined to take over the mine probably influenced others to consider it a lost cause. With hindsight, that was a poor decision and a missed opportunity, but it was the end of the Occidental Mine, at least for the foreseeable future.

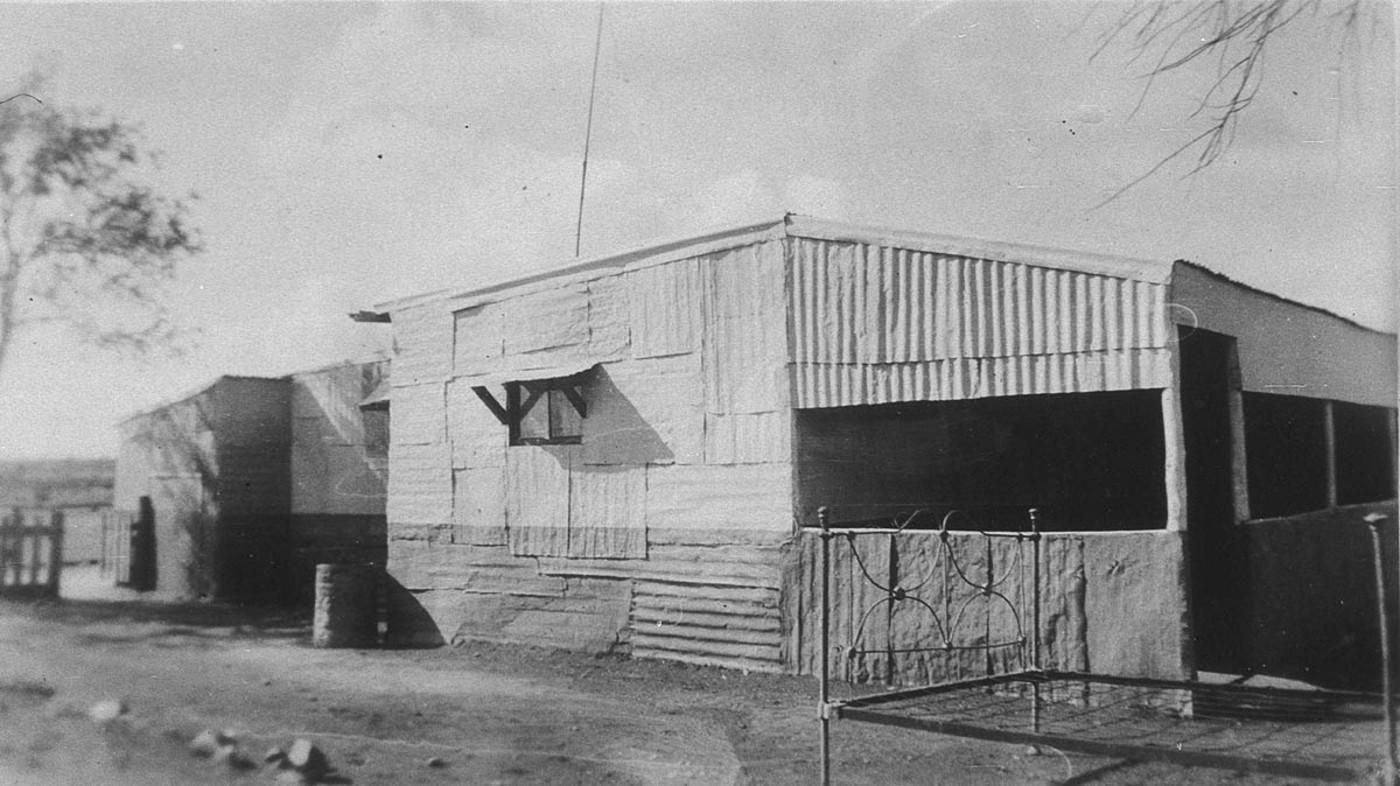
A miner's house in Wrightville, clad in corrugated iron and flattened cyanide cans, c.1920 (State Library of NSW)

Prospects for miners at other mines in the Cobar area were poor at the time. In March 1919, the vast Great Cobar Mine, Cobar's main employer, closed; it had also employed many Wrightville residents. The Chesney Mine had used the Great Cobar's smelters, and it too closed in March 1919. Then came the unexpected closure, due to an underground fire, of the C.S.A. Mine, located to the north of the Cobar township, at Elouera, in March 1920. Another of Wrightville's mines, the Gladstone Mine, closed, around May 1920, because it was reliant upon the copper smelters at the C.S.A. Mine, which closed at that time. Further afield, at Canbelego, the only remaining large mine in the region, Mount Boppy Gold Mine, ceased hard rock mining in September 1921, and closed all its remaining operations in 1922. Only the gold mine at The Peak, to the south of Wrightville, remained in operation after 1922, and it continued to operate—under various owners—until 1953. Many miners and their families left the district altogether.

In January 1920, the village's population had been 930, but at the April 1921 census, it had already fallen to 338; without the Occidental Mine, it declined further. The village began to lose its amenities. Wrightville Pictures had already closed, by May 1919, and relocated to Lake Cargelligo. The assets of the Great Cobar were up for sale, in April 1921, and these included cottages at Wrightville and The Peak. All four of Wrighville's hotels closed; the Chesney in 1921, the Family in 1922, and the Young Australia and Tattersall's in 1923. The police station closed, in June 1922. The convent school closed at the end of 1922, and the public school closed in October 1924. Buildings were put up for sale and were removed, from both Wrightville and Cobar, to be re-erected in more prosperous places.

Local government at Wrightville effectively ended in 1922, due to its dwindling population. Some consideration had been given to merging Wrightville's municipality with Cobar, but Cobar council was strongly opposed to that outcome. Instead, the Wrightville Council was in such a dire state—it had insufficient alderman to constitute a quorum, and no longer had a town clerk—that it was declared a 'defaulting area', in June 1922. A special act of parliament, Wrightville Municipality Abolition Act, was passed at the end of September 1922. Jabez Wright himself—by then the local member representing the area including Wrightville—spoke in the parliamentary debate on the Act, giving a short speech, defending the interests of the village bearing the same name as his own, on 6 September 1922. At the end of his speech, he is reported to have remarked, 'Wrightville is gone, but Wright is all right", although those remarks are not recorded in Parliamentary Hansard. Wright attended the parliamentary sitting on the following day but, on 10 September 1922, he died at Bondi.

It had been planned to wind up the operations of the municipality in an orderly fashion, but, in the meantime, in March 1921, the council chambers, and all its records, were destroyed in a fire. After a period under the control of an administrator, tasked with the recovery of unpaid council rates, the municipality was abolished in 1924, becoming part of the unincorporated Western Division.

In 1923, a visitor to Wrightville remarked that, "Houses were plentiful, but scarcely any occupied. A loose sheet of iron flapping on the roof of one seemed to be mournfully tolling the death of the suburb." By 1925, the population was only 389.

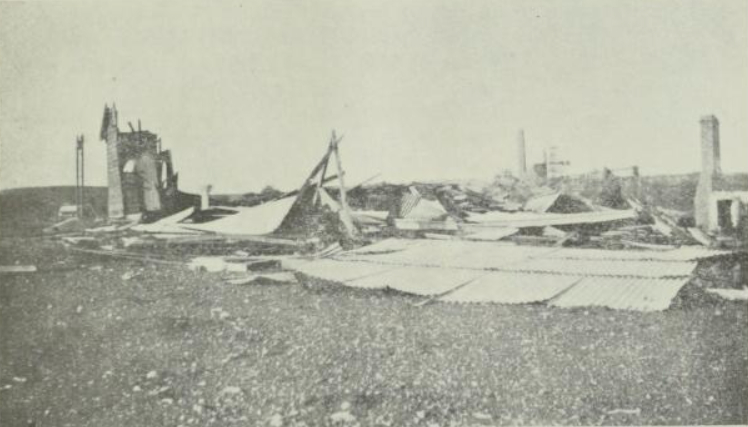
Ruins of St. David's Anglican church, (1927).

The decline of Wrightville continued. In 1928, it was described as, "a sleeping village, where quietness prevails, though many old residents are content to remain there", and a fine house, once that of the mine's general manager, was rented for only a shilling a week. On 28 February 1927, the Anglican church (St David's), which had not been used for several years, blew down in a storm; its ruins were sold at public auction and the money used for repairs to the neighbouring rectory. In 1929, the Catholic church building was up for sale. By 1930, the village was fighting, ultimately successfully it appears, to retain the mail service from Cobar to Wrightville, although there was no post office between 1933 and 1935.

=== Revival, terminal decline, and disappearance (1933-1970) ===
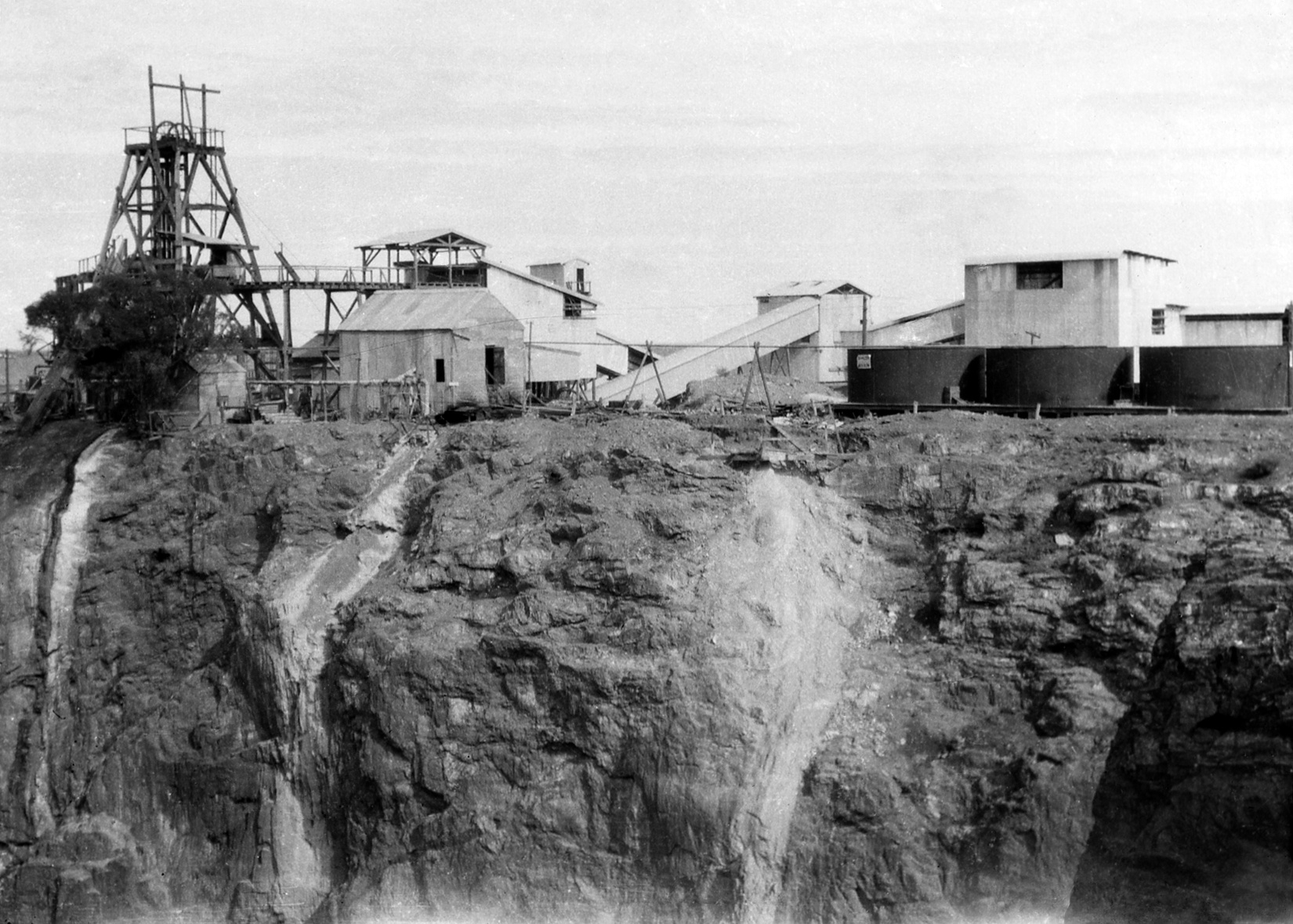
The (New) Occidental Gold Mine, taken between 1935 and 1937.

In 1929, Australia left the gold standard, resulting in a devaluation of the Australian pound relative to the pound sterling. Britain later devalued the pound sterling against gold in 1931, when it too abandoned the gold standard, increasing the gold price in both British and Australian currencies. Various currency pegs of the Australian pound to sterling applied, until December 1931, when the Australian government set a rate of £A 1 to 16 shillings sterling. The US abandoned the gold standard in 1933, but the official U.S. Government gold price was increased from US$20.67 to US$35 in 1934. Increasing gold prices led to a revival of gold mining.

There was only a slight revival of the village, from 1933, after the reopening of the Occidental Gold Mine, thereafter known as the New Occidental Gold Mine. Although the old Occidental Mine had already been worked for over thirty years, from 1889 to 1921, the New Occidental Gold Mine went on to be recognised as the largest and most productive in New South Wales.

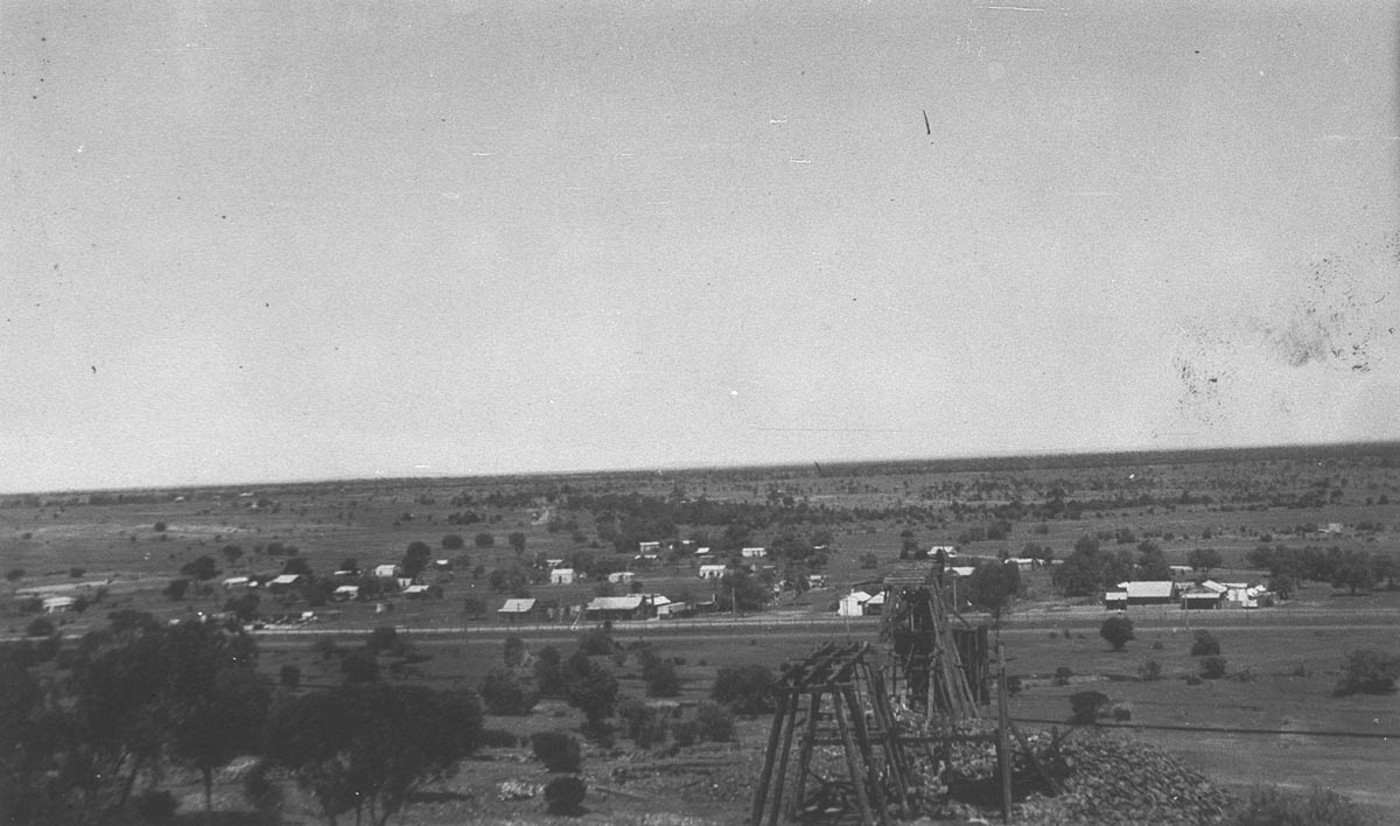
Part of Wrightville viewed from the headframe of the Chesney Mine (c.1935) (State Library of NSW)

The Cobar Gold Mine, thereafter known as the New Cobar Gold Mine reopened in 1935; it was absorbed by the New Occidental company, in 1936, and started production in 1937. The company also became a significant copper producer, acquiring the nearby Chesney Mine, in 1937.

The reopening of the mines initiated the second era of mining prosperity in the Cobar region. The old Peak branch railway to the Occidental Mine, which had been closed beyond a siding in the Cobar township, in September 1931, reopened in July 1934.

It was Cobar that benefited more from the reopening of the three mines rather than Wrightville. In 1937, the New Occidental company was employing 400 men, but most of them were living in Cobar; many of the dwellings of those still living at Wrightville, were described as being "humpies". A plan by the mine, to build 25 new homes at Wrightville for its employees, was taken over by Cobar council and redirected to that town.

The hotel in Cobar that was closest to Wrighville, the Star, was renamed New Occidental Hotel; there would be no new hotel at Wrightville. Wrightville's progress association lobbied for a school for the village; in 1936, the government refused that request, citing uncertainty of the village's school-age population and the willingness of a local bus operator to carry the children over the short distance to schools in Cobar.

In 1950, the boundaries of Cobar were extended, so that what remained of Wrightville and Dapville could receive council-provided services. Perhaps of more importance to the Cobar council, the new boundaries now included the nearby mines. Wrightville was, by then, just a declining suburb of the larger town. At the New South Wales state election of June 1950, just 102 votes were counted at Wrightville.

The New Occidental Mine closed on 1 November 1952, after its operation became unprofitable due to rising costs. The Chesney and New Cobar mines, both run by the New Occidental company, could not stand on their own and also closed. The closure of Wrightville's mines began the terminal decline of the old village. If coverage of the mines' closing mentioned the effect that would have, it was the effect on Cobar, not Wrightville. By late 1952, Cobar's population was down to around 2,000, and the survival of the town itself was in jeopardy.

In 1956, enough Wrightville residents came out to watch a bicycle race, as it passed through the village, for that to be reported in the news. In 1958, the post office closed. In 1964, Wrightville was no longer a polling place for elections, probably because there was probably no public building there, after the closure of the post office, which could have been used as a polling place. In August 1965, the Peak branch railway was decommissioned beyond a siding in the Cobar township. Also in 1965, large-scale mining resumed at the C.S.A. Mine, 10 km north of Cobar, leading to a revival of that town as a mining centre. However, by the late 1960s, the remaining dilapidated buildings in Wrightville were considered an eyesore, and the site was bulldozed, erasing the last of the old village.

=== Aftermath ===
In 1975 and 1993, land there was being sold off to recover unpaid council rates.

The New Occidental lode, Chesney lode and New Cobar lode have been mined for gold and copper, in recent years.

== Remnants ==
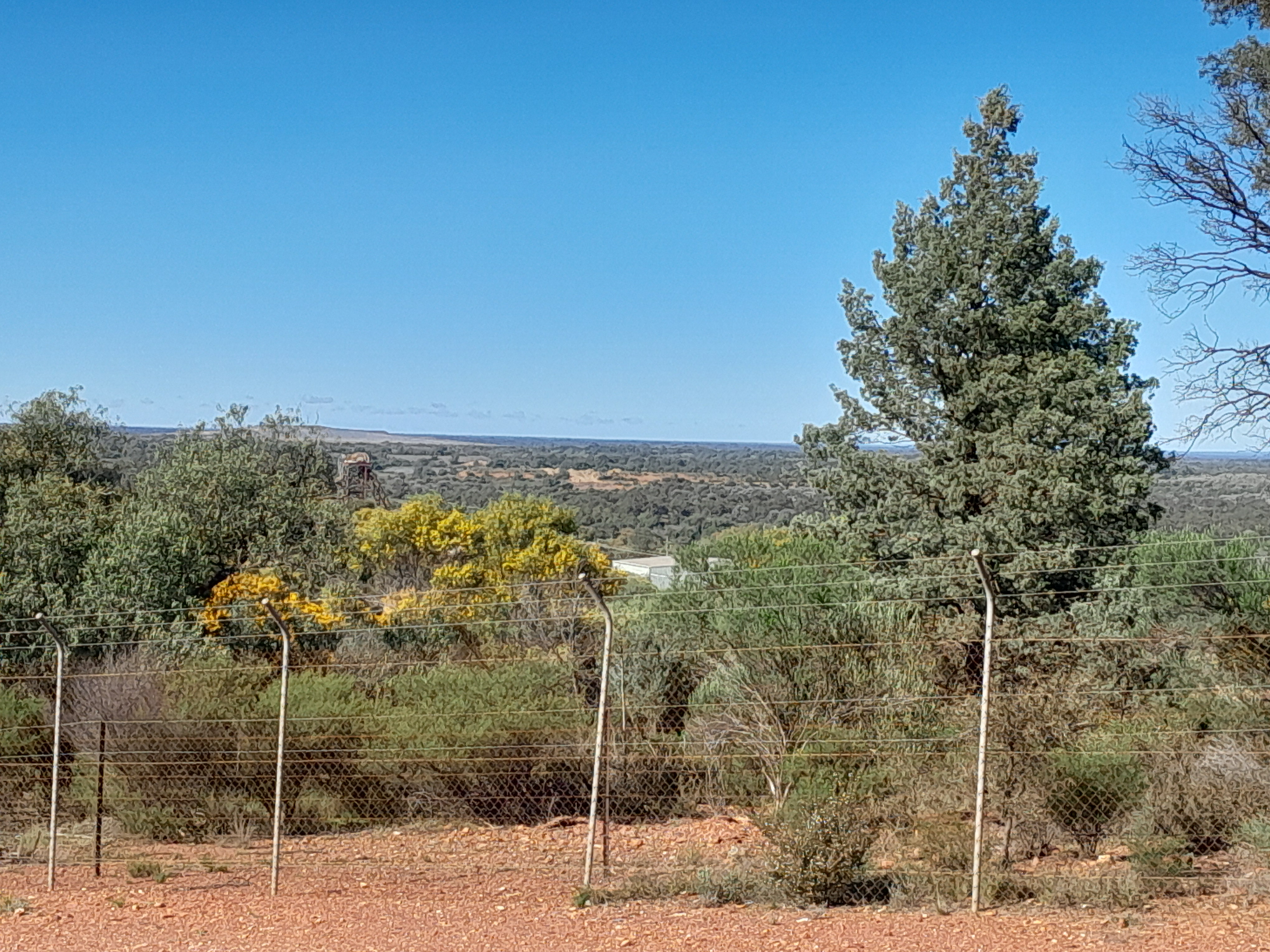
View from Fort Bourke Hill, over the former sites of Dapville and Wrightville (August 2024). Left of centre, the headframe of the more recent Chesney Mine operation can be seen, among the vegetation. Also left of centre, in the background are the huge heaps of tailings from the Occidental Mine.

Some common land of the former village of Wrightville still exists—west of Kidman Way, near the old Occidental mine site— as do some of the mine sites. The portion of Kidman Way that passes through the now empty sites of the former village of Wrightville, and the neighbouring former village of Dapville, is still identified as 'Hunt Street', the name of the main road through both villages. The old main street, Hunt Street, is now a gravel road running parallel to Kidman Way and just to its west. The names of two other old streets, Cobar Street and East Parade, are still used for existing roads. The formation of the old railway, 'The Peak branch', is still discernible, in satellite views, where it ran toward the Occidental Mine and passed along the eastern edge of the village, as are the outlines of some of Wrightville's old streets. The open cut pit of the New Occidental Mine is still there.

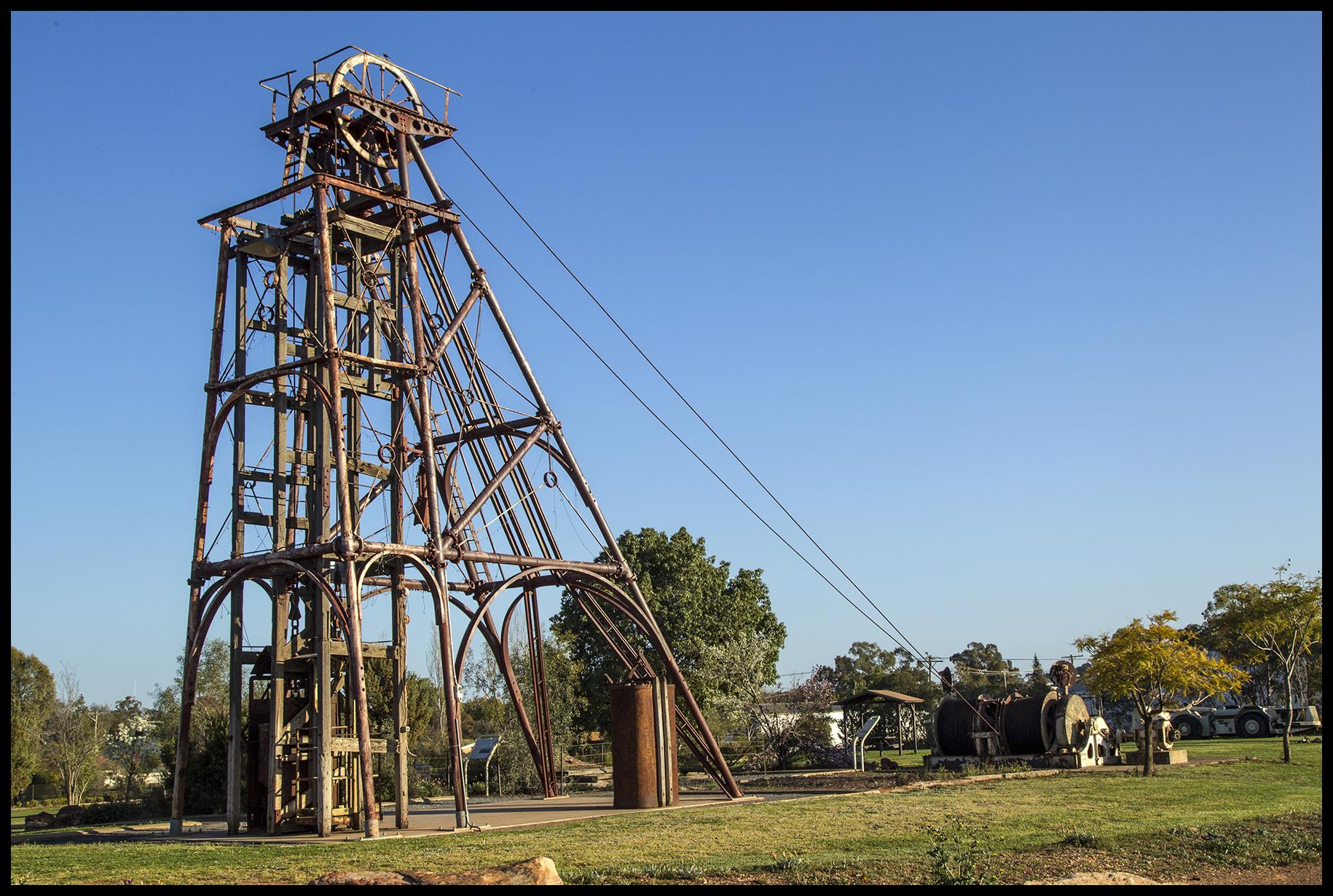
Headframe and winder from the old Chesney Mine (Cobar Miners' Heritage Park)

A winder and headframe relocated from the old Chesney Mine are on display at the Cobar Miner's Heritage Park. The Cobar Uniting Church contains the Roll of Honour, for the Old Boys of the Wrightville Methodist Sunday School, which was originally unveiled in the former Wrightville Methodist Church. It lists twenty names, five of whom died and six of whom were wounded during the First World War.

There is a short street in Cobar by the name of Wrightville Street that intersects with Dapville Street; these are more recent streets that commemorate, by their naming, the long-gone villages. Also in Cobar, the name of Wrightville's largest mine was recalled by the naming of the New Occidental Hotel, until it was burnt down in a fire in 2014. The topographic map covering the area south of Cobar is titled 'Wrightville'.

There are documents and records relating to the village, its mines, its council, and some of its residents, in the New South Wales Government's State Archives Collection. There are some photographs of Wrightville, taken between 1900 and 1935, and the plans of the village and the neighbouring village of Dapville, in the collection of the State Library of New South Wales. The rule book of its trade union branch is in the collection of the National Library of Australia.

Otherwise, Wrightville, once a thriving mining settlement with pretensions to rival its near neighbour, Cobar, has disappeared completely, along with its neighbouring village, Dapville.
