= Illewong, New South Wales =

Ghost town in New South Wales, Australia

Coordinates: 31°37′10.2″S 145°57′17.2″E

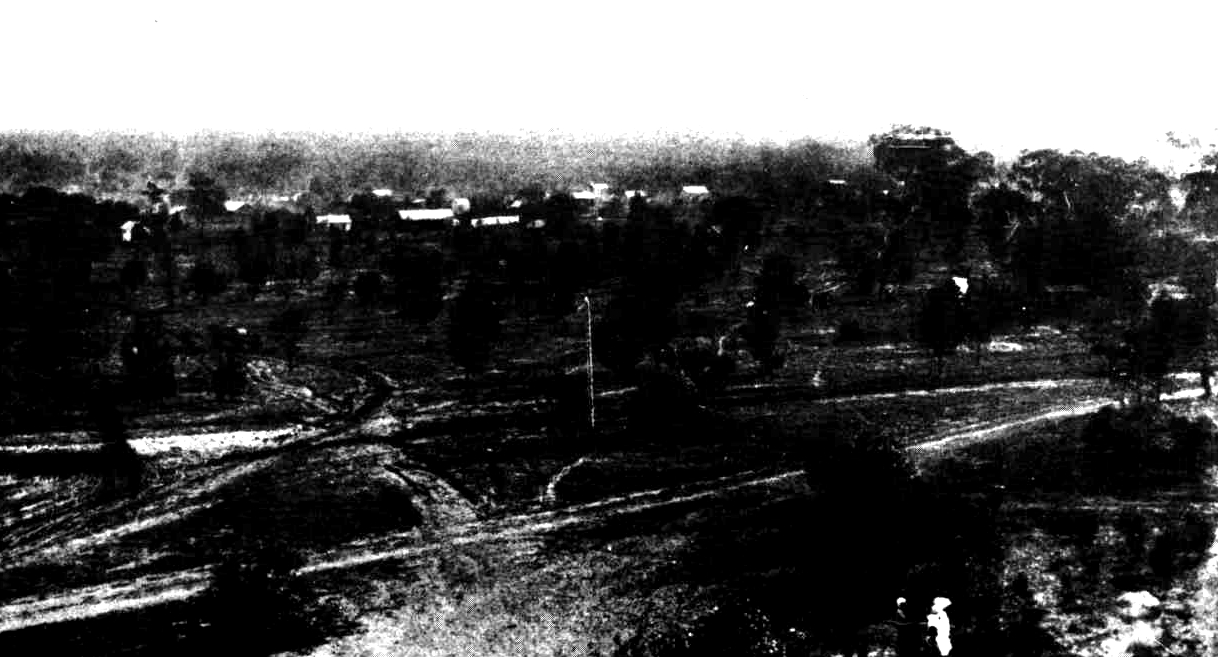
The settlement, then known as Bee Mountain, in its early days, c.1905.

Illewong was a mining village, now a ghost town, in the Orana region of New South Wales, Australia. Prior to 1906, it was known as Bee Mountain. The area, in which Illewong once lay, is now part of Cobar, for postal and statistical purposes.

== Location ==
The village was around 17.5 kilometres (the road distance was described as '12 miles' or 19 kilometres) south east of Cobar, in the County of Robinson, Parish of Narri. It should not be confused with the Parish of Illewong, in the adjoining County of Blaxland.

== History ==
=== Aboriginal occupation ===
The area that later became Illewong lies within the traditional lands of Wangaaypuwan dialect speakers (also known as Wangaibon) of Ngiyampaa people, referred to in their own language as Ngiyampaa Wangaaypuwan.

=== Queen Bee Copper Mine ===
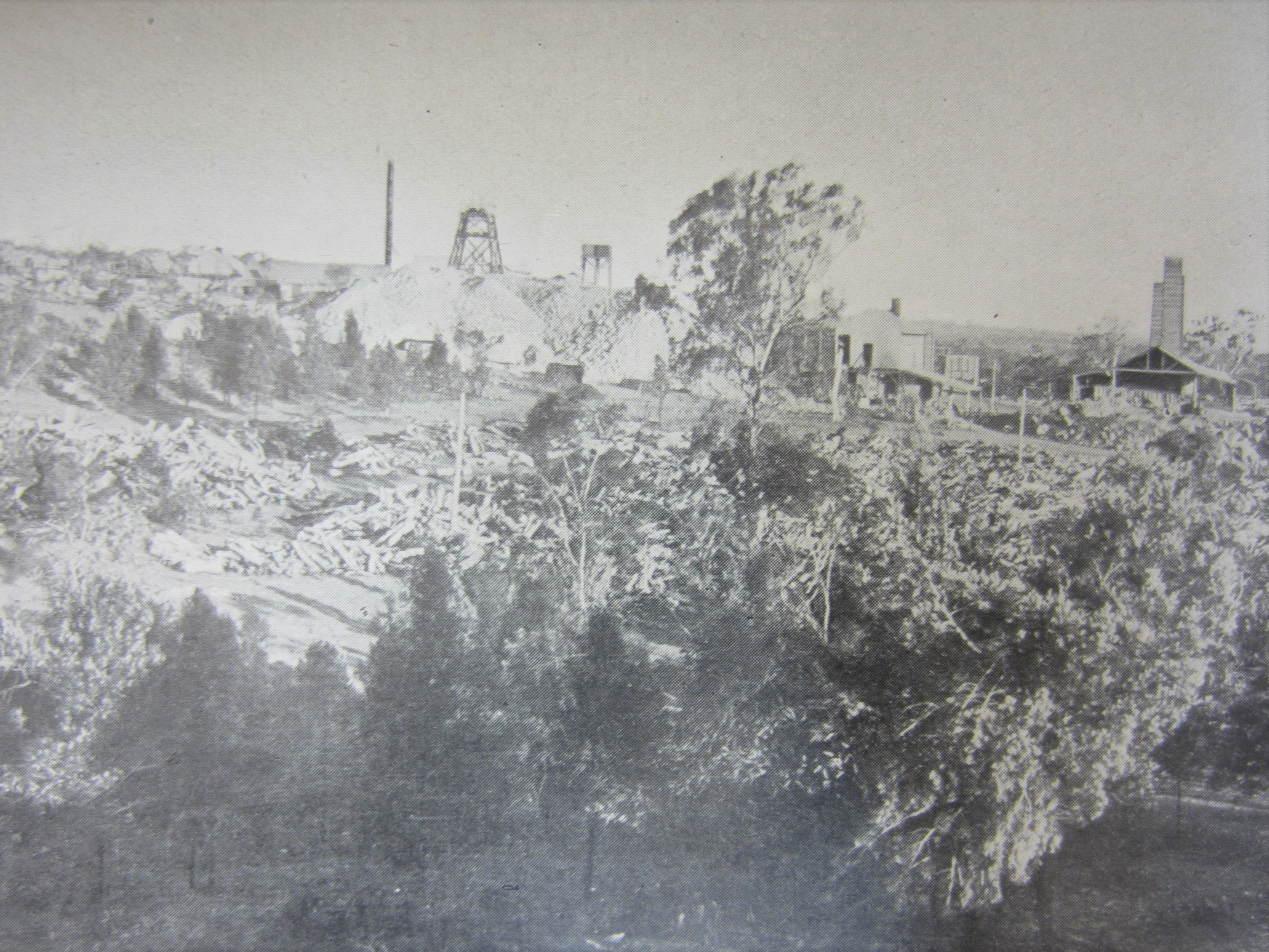
Queen Bee Copper Mine c.1911.

Before Illewong, the area was known as Bee Mountain. Gold was discovered there in June 1889 and, by August 1889, there had been a minor gold rush. Although some prospecting continued into the early 1890s, the field did not have a large and rich gold deposit, unlike the recently established gold mines around Wrightville. In June 1902, a rich deposit of copper ore was discovered, and leases were taken out over 80 acres of land. The Queen Bee Copper Mining Company was established on 26 November 1903; its directors were local men from Cobar and Wrightville. The development of the Queen Bee mine and erection of its smelters were underway by mid 1904. By August 1905, the mine and smelters were well in production. A serious accident occurred in July 1906, Allan Roberts was working at the bottom of a shaft when a large stone fell 100 feet, striking him on the head. He suffered a compound fracture of the skull. Taken to hospital at Cobar, he was operated upon, and regained consciousness, but was left paralysed on one side.

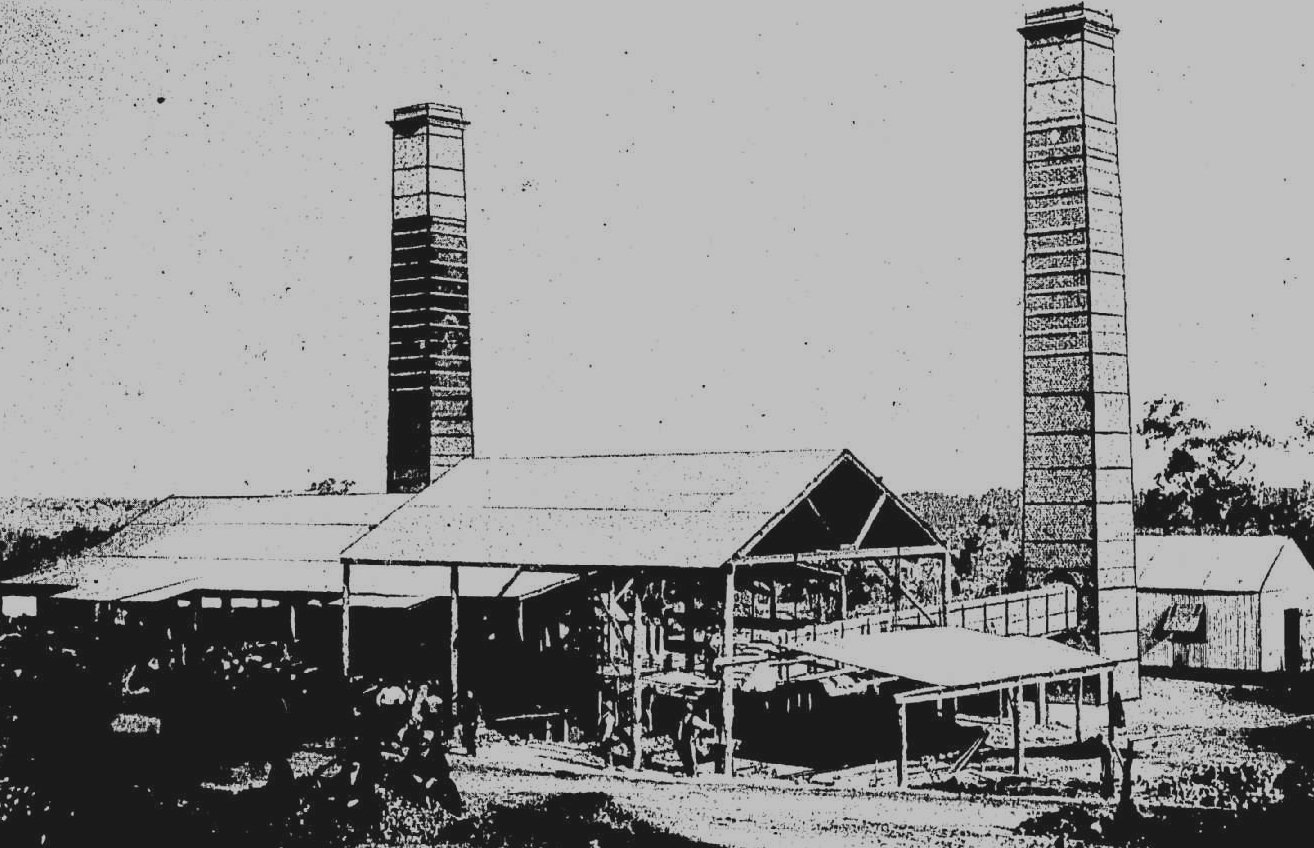
Queen Bee smelters, c.1906

By 1907, the Queen Bee mine had "a winding engine, a vertical engine for driving rock breakers, air blowers, saw benches, etc., a 9-h.p. rock drill air-compressing plant, fitting shop, a No.5 Krupp ball mill for crushing quartz, for fettling the smelting and roasting furnaces, three reverberatory smelting furnaces, one refining furnace, brick-making plant, and a 36in. water-jacket cupola furnace, with which experiments are being made for the purpose of securing data as to the best means of dealing with the low-grade ores."

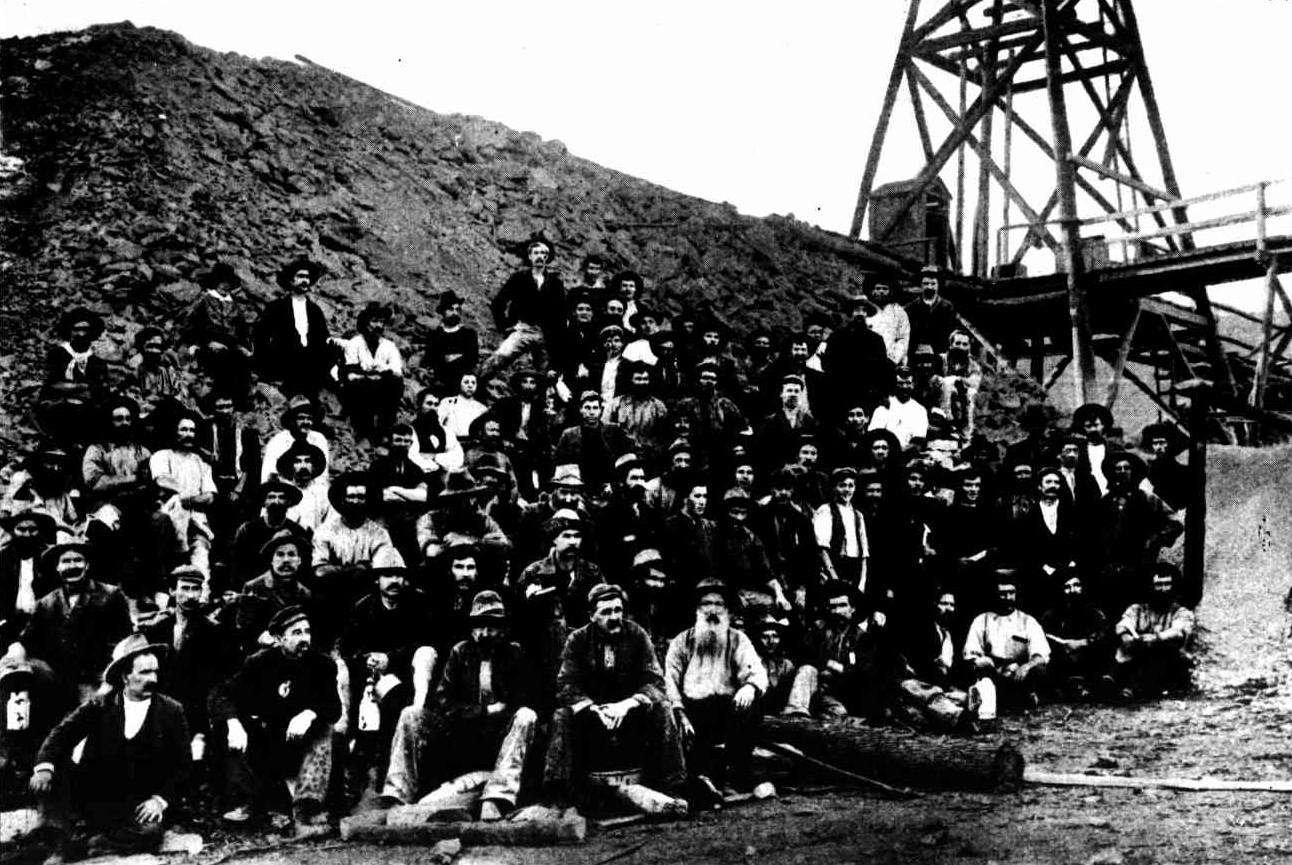
Miners of the Queen Bee Copper Mine, c.1905.

By 1907, the copper price was booming, The mine in those early years was profitable, and paid dividends in 1907. Nonetheless, the well-equipped but remote mine had its challenges. It was some distance from the nearest railway at Wrightville, its copper ore grades had fallen over time, and were now mainly low-grade. The reverberatory furnaces used large amounts of wood as fuel. The slag from its reverberatory furnace contained around 1.5% copper, and it used the cupola furnace in experimental smelting that resulted in 0.3% copper in the slag. On the basis of the experiments, it had ordered a water jacket furnace, but it would need to bring coke from Wollongong, a costly proposition. The water jacket furnace was a success and its production rate was nearly equivalent to that of three reverberatory furnaces. A second water jacket furnace was added in 1909, using a second hand Roots blower from the Great Cobar Mine. One reverberatory furnace was retained for roasting copper matte to make blister copper, but subsequently all smelting was done using the water-jacket furnaces.

In October 1908, there was an underground fire in the mine, but it was extinguished, after some days, and work was able to continue.

By mid 1909, the main shaft was 602 feet deep (183 metres). There were five levels of the mine, the first being at 150 feet (46 m) down and the deepest level being at 570 feet (174 metres).

In December 1909, the Queen Bee mine shutdown for a time, intending to raise more capital. Development work in the mine did not recommence until September 1910. Rising copper prices led to the Queen Bee mine resuming production by April 1912.

The price of copper fell at the beginning of 1913. Despite optimistic reports, the mine needed urgent prospecting and development to uncover new ore. After just less than a year of full operation, in March 1913, the mine was once again shutdown. Dalgety & Company made a petition to wind up the company, for unpaid debts, in December 1913, and an order to wind up the company was made in February 1914.

The mining leases had been forfeited for non-payment of rent, in June 1913. The old company objected unsuccessfully when a local man, Robert Ellis, took out fresh leases and took possession of the mine site. When he claimed ownership of the all items on the leases, including any copper, the stockpiled ore, and the equipment of the Queen Bee mine, a protracted dispute began. Ellis did no mining but recovered copper and copper ore from the site, which he shipped to Port Kembla. He damaged the smelting furnaces, in order to obtain 50 tons of copper that was still in the furnace bottoms. The dispute ended, in July 1914, when the parties reached a settlement, ending legal action.

=== Village of Illewong ===
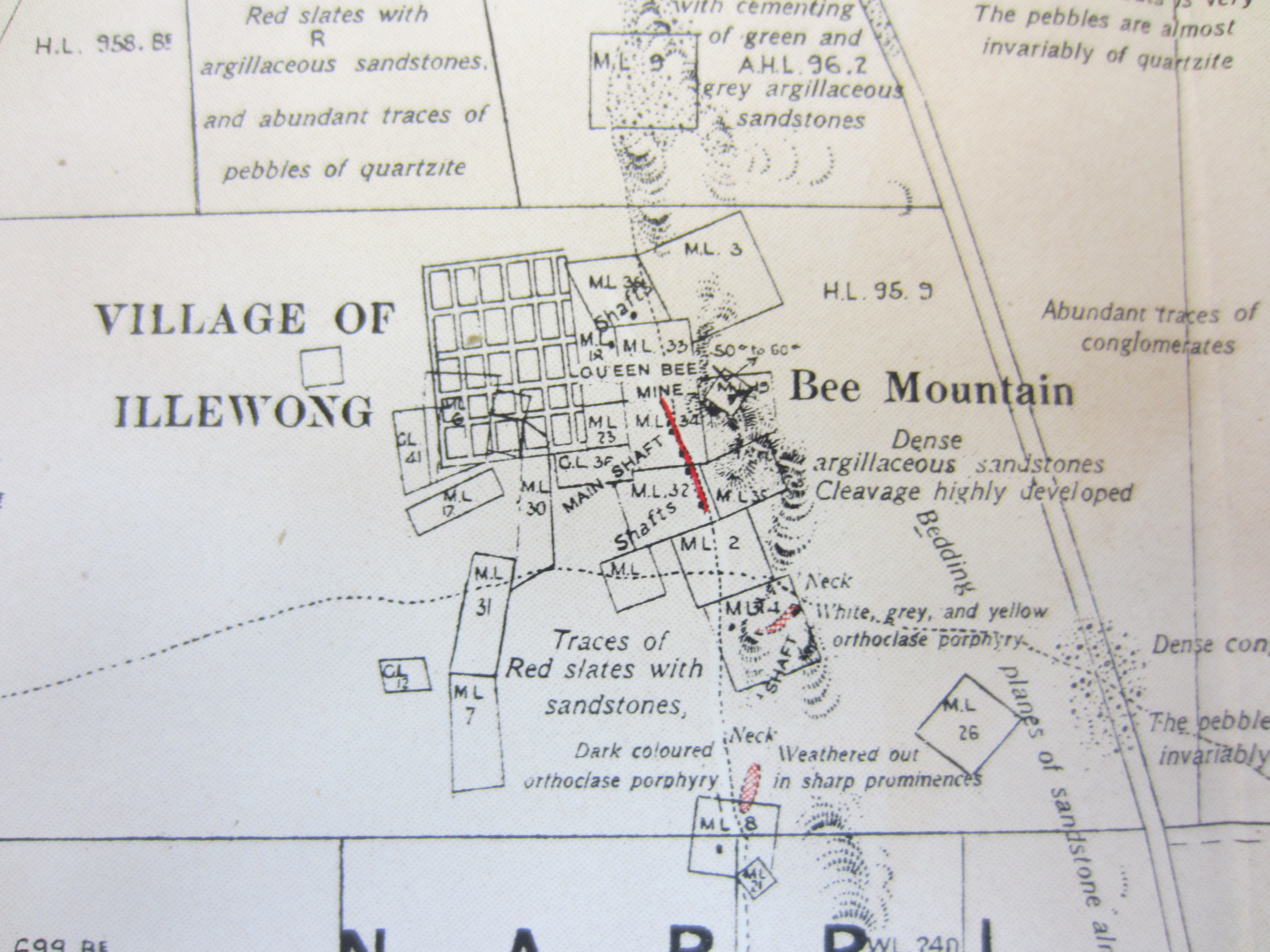
Site of Illewong in relation to Queen Bee Mine.

==== Heyday ====
A settlement, including a store, had developed at Bee Mountain, by the end of 1904. The population had reached 140, by October 1904, and was, reportedly, over 200 by the end of that year. The settlement was associated with the Queen Bee Copper Mine, and to its south the Queen Bee South, amongst others in the surrounding area. The village's school opened in April 1905. A post office opened there in September 1905.

There was one hotel there, by September 1905, the Bee Mountain Hotel. The hotel became the scene of a drunken disturbance involving some of the settlement's men and women, on Sunday 19 November 1905, and other offences committed there up to 22 November 1905. There were numerous charges laid, including charges of riotous behaviour, malicious damage to property, indecent language, drunkenness, and aiding and abetting gaming on licensed premises. In January 1906, a licence for another then newly-completed hotel building, the Royal Hotel, was granted.

There was a 'tank'—an excavated reservoir—at Bee Mountain, before the village, but it was inadequate. By March 1903, water for the residents was being carried, 12 miles from Brura Tank, and sold at a rate of 12 shillings for 200 gallons. 640 acres of land had been reserved for a water supply 'tank' a contract let, and, by August 1906, its construction was well under way.

The village was proclaimed, on 18 April 1906, with the name Illewong. The existing school and post office, both originally called Bee Mountain, were renamed Illewong; the school, in July 1906, and the post office in September 1906. There was a telephone at the post office, at latest from around late 1907. The nearest passenger railway was at Cobar, but a freight railway, known as The Peak branch line, operated as far as Wrightville.

Always a small village—its population reportedly around 300, in September 1907—in its heyday, Illewong could nonetheless support a town band, and various sporting teams; football, tennis, cricket, and even a rifle club. A rifle range lay to the north of the village and mine. Church of England (Anglican), Catholic, and Wesleyan (Methodist) church services were held at Elouera. Illewong had union branches, of both the Amalgamated Miners Association, which represented the miners of the Queen Bee Mine, and the Engine Drivers and Fireman's Association.

==== Decline ====
The mine was closed, between December 1909 and September 1910, after which mine development work recommenced. By late 1909, both Illewomg and the nearby larger village of Wrightville were in decline. A storekeeper, Thomas Predergast, had stores in both villages, but his business failed in mid 1909. The last storekeeper, Mr Milson, decided to relocate to Wrightville, in December 1909, and Illewong was left without any store at all.

The village had two hotels. One hotel, the Royal Hotel, also known as 'Daley's Hotel', was totally destroyed, in a fire, at the end of March 1910. By The building was owned by a reformed bushranger, Patrick Daley, and it was fully-insured. The village's remaining hotel, the Bee Mountain Hotel, also known as 'Martin's Hotel', also burned down, in November 1914; it was also insured. The causes of both fires were unknown, but the timing of each fire corresponded to a protracted interruption of mining activity at Illewong, and neither hotel was ever rebuilt. Martin was about to take over the Royal Hotel, at Canbelego, when it too was destroyed by fire in February 1915.

The village had a policeman, Constable Malony, who had been stationed there for seven years, when he was found dead with an apparently self-inflicted gunshot wound to the head, in October 1912. He was about to be transferred to Parkes, and his body was found when his replacement arrived. He was buried in the village's cemetery.

Copper production only recommenced in April 1912. Low copper prices led the mine to close again in March 1913, putting further downward pressure on the village's population.The police station closed around December 1913. The school closed in May 1916.

=== Brief revival of Mount Illewong Mine ===
By May 1915, the price of copper had risen, to £76 12s 6d per ton, due to wartime demand, and there was the prospect of the mine reopening. In October 1916, the British Munitions Department agreed to buy the entire production of most of the larger Australian copper mines, including Great Cobar mine, at a price of £120 per ton.

In 1916, the old Queen Bee Copper Mine was reborn as the Mount Illewong Mine. The mine was dewatered, in early 1916, after around four years of inactivity. A new concentrator plant replaced the on-site smelting of the previous operations. By mid 1916, copper concentrate was shipped to a copper smelter and refinery at Port Kembla. This revival of the mine—it employed only around twenty men in February 1917—failed to last. Operations were "temporarily curtailed", in October 1917, with the reason being that Port Kembla already had too much ore.

Around March 1919, the equipment was stripped from the mine. Six men later worked the mine as tributers—supplying the C.S.A. mine's smelter, at Elouera, north of Cobar township— but large scale mining there was over. The C.S.A. smelters closed, in April 1920, leading to the immediate closing of other copper mines in the Cobar district.

=== End of the village ===
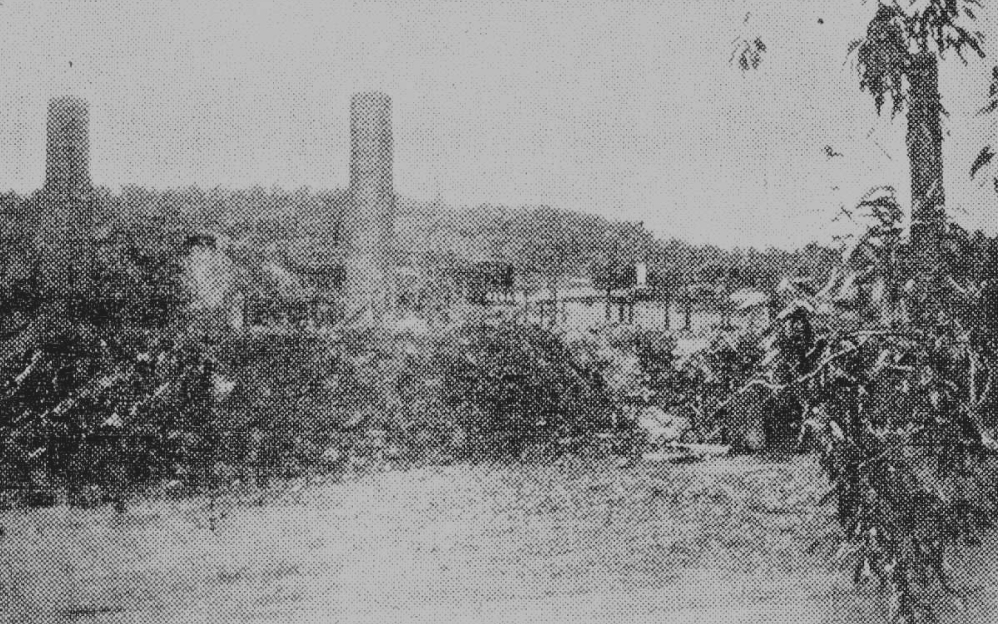
Abandoned Mount Illewong (formerly Queen Bee) mine and smelter, c.1928.

In late 1922, the village was described as a "deserted mining town", and the disused school building was demolished and taken to Dubbo. In 1923, it was reported that only one family was dwelling there, and that a house or shop, in the deserted village, could be bought for just the value of the transfer fee. Only five votes had been recorded there in the 1920 election and, in late 1926, Illewong was abolished as a polling place. Money order and savings bank facilities were withdrawn from the post office, at the beginning of February 1920, and the post office closed in February 1927.

Without mining, the village had rapidly faded away. What may be the last official mentions of the place occurred during 1941, when the village's plan was altered, effectively reducing its area and the dedication of the land for its school was revoked.

== Remnants ==
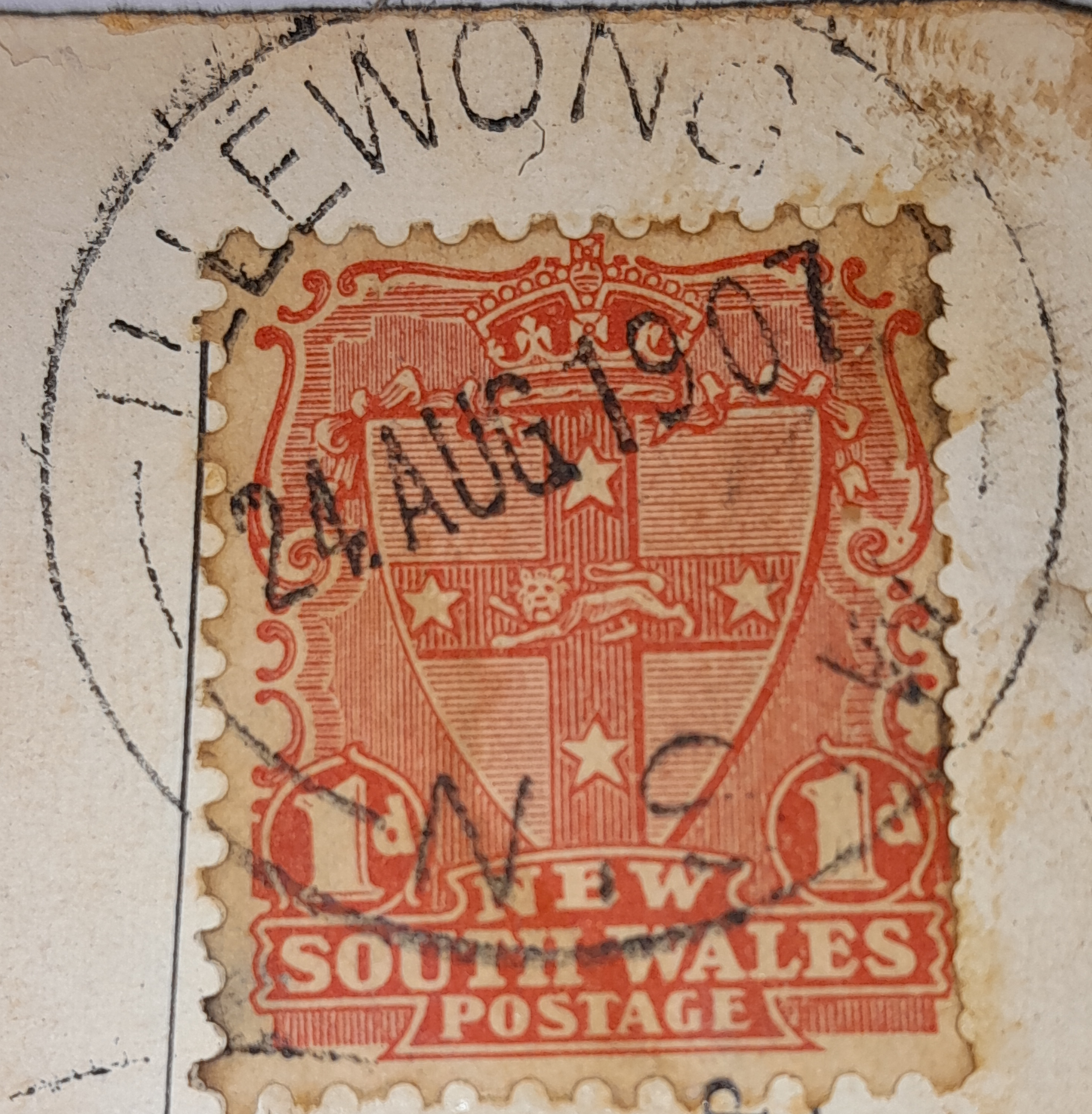
Postmark (1907)

Although its building allotments and street plan still exist, what was once the village of Illewong has now disappeared, except for some remains of the old mine workings, slag from smelting operations, the village's cemetery, and a semi-cleared area at the village's former site. In satellite views, it is possible to discern the street shown in the village plan as Meryula Street, and the remnants of the village's 'tank' or excavated water reservoir. The village was once connected to Cobar via the Cobar-Illewong road, which branched from the Hillston Road (modern-day Kidman Way), just to the north of The Peak mine, and continued beyond Illewong to Nymagee; its former route is no longer readily discernible in satellite views. The old village site and mine ruins are not accessible to the public, because the access road is on private land.

== Mining prospect ==
In July 2024, it was reported that a program of drilling by Aurelia Metals had intersected copper ore with a significant gold content, below the old workings at Queen Bee—10 km south of their Peak Gold Mine—and that consistent mineralisation was present to at least 400 m depth and was around 140 m in width. They also announced that their processing operations would transition to being primarily for copper rather than gold.
