= Blaxland County =

Blaxland New South Wales
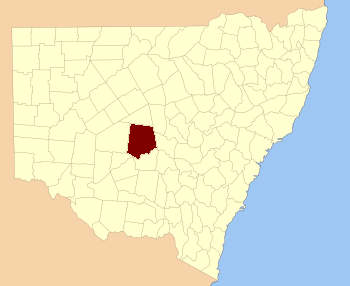
- Location in New South Wales
Lands administrative divisions around Blaxland:
Mouramba	Mouramba	Flinders
Mossgiel	Blaxland	Cunningham
Franklin	Dowling	Gipps

Blaxland County is one of the 141 cadastral divisions of New South Wales. It is bounded to the south by the Lachlan River and a small part of Waverley Creek. It includes Mount Hope and the Nombinnie Nature Reserve.

Blaxland County was named in honour of John Blaxland, landowner and merchant.

== Parishes within this county ==
A full list of parishes found within this county; their current LGA and mapping coordinates to the approximate centre of each location is as follows:

Parish	LGA	Coordinates
Back Roto	Carrathool Shire	33°07′59″S 145°33′45″E
Back Wallandra	Carrathool Shire	33°08′14″S 145°42′33″E
Back Whoey	Cobar Shire	33°06′42″S 146°12′06″E
Beauport	Cobar Shire	32°53′22″S 146°35′59″E
Bogalo	Cobar Shire	32°42′10″S 146°14′02″E
Bogalo South	Cobar Shire	32°46′37″S 146°13′38″E
Booberoi	Cobar Shire	33°03′34″S 146°31′00″E
Boothumble	Cobar Shire	32°55′46″S 146°13′04″E
Buckley	Carrathool Shire	33°18′51″S 145°44′41″E
Bundure	Cobar Shire	32°39′56″S 146°04′56″E
Bundure South	Cobar Shire	32°44′10″S 146°04′14″E
Burthong	Cobar Shire	32°24′53″S 146°17′54″E
Burthong South	Cobar Shire	32°30′37″S 146°15′36″E
Cagellico	Cobar Shire	33°00′17″S 146°16′13″E
Calytria	Cobar Shire	unknown
Coan	Cobar Shire	32°45′21″S 145°43′40″E
Cobram	Cobar Shire	32°32′08″S 146°03′26″E
Coree	Cobar Shire	32°40′28″S 145°56′04″E
Creamy Hills	Cobar Shire	32°58′57″S 146°28′15″E
Currawallah	Cobar Shire	32°40′36″S 146°24′17″E
East Gilgunnia	Cobar Shire	32°27′59″S 145°57′44″E
Eeramaran	Cobar Shire	32°28′54″S 146°21′04″E
Eribendery	Cobar Shire	33°07′45″S 146°21′18″E
Euabalong	Cobar Shire	33°05′09″S 146°25′10″E
Gilgunnia	Cobar Shire	32°25′2.6″S 146°2′3.5″E
Gonn	Cobar Shire	32°52′17″S 145°44′29″E
Gooan	Cobar Shire	32°30′04″S 145°56′50″E
Gounelgerie	Carrathool Shire	32°58′00″S 145°31′58″E
Guagong	Cobar Shire	unknown
Guapa	Cobar Shire	32°33′24″S 146°13′37″E
Guapa West	Cobar Shire	32°37′25″S 146°07′45″E
Gunnagi	Carrathool Shire	33°11′08″S 145°28′56″E
Hyandra	Cobar Shire	33°10′36″S 146°12′04″E
Illewong (*)	Cobar Shire	32°53′01″S 146°20′15″E
Illewong West	Cobar Shire	32°53′27″S 146°12′36″E
Ina	Cobar Shire	33°01′43″S 146°02′55″E
Jundrie	Carrathool Shire	33°19′34″S 146°00′07″E
Keginni	Cobar Shire	32°36′10″S 145°39′04″E
Killeen	Cobar Shire	32°29′37″S 145°47′28″E
Killeen South	Cobar Shire	32°33′18″S 145°46′14″E
Mahurangi	Cobar Shire	33°02′44″S 145°40′46″E
Mahurangi East	Cobar Shire	33°02′52″S 145°46′01″E
Manopa	Carrathool Shire	33°00′24″S 145°35′50″E
Marobee	Cobar Shire	32°33′51″S 146°25′27″E
Marobee East	Cobar Shire	32°36′43″S 146°32′07″E
Marooba	Carrathool Shire	32°51′39″S 145°37′11″E
Matakana	Cobar Shire	32°57′34″S 145°53′25″E
Matakana South	Cobar Shire	33°04′09″S 145°53′25″E
Meldior	Cobar Shire	32°51′43″S 146°28′46″E
Mellelea	Cobar Shire	33°02′25″S 146°10′56″E
Merrimerriwa	Cobar Shire	32°43′23″S 145°35′52″E
Moora	Cobar Shire	32°58′58″S 146°21′44″E
Mordie	Carrathool Shire	32°54′58″S 145°31′44″E
Mount Allen	Cobar Shire	32°44′02″S 145°52′49″E
Mount Hope	Cobar Shire	32°53′33″S 145°51′40″E
Mount Solitary	Cobar Shire	32°54′23″S 145°56′45″E
Mulga	Cobar Shire	32°59′00″S 146°02′34″E
Nombinnie	Cobar Shire	32°47′28″S 145°46′49″E
North Hyandra	Carrathool Shire	33°13′44″S 146°00′35″E
North Peak	Cobar Shire	32°27′21″S 146°09′26″E
Oneida	Carrathool Shire	33°05′54″S 145°51′31″E
Roto	Carrathool Shire	33°10′25″S 145°34′26″E
Salamagundia	Carrathool Shire	33°09′43″S 145°54′32″E
South Peak	Cobar Shire	32°24′04″S 145°59′48″E
South Thule	Cobar Shire	32°24′10″S 145°42′27″E
South Yackerboon	Cobar Shire	32°24′51″S 145°49′47″E
Tallebung	Cobar Shire	32°40′06″S 146°32′18″E
Tara	Cobar Shire	32°35′18″S 146°18′31″E
Tara South	Cobar Shire	32°37′39″S 146°18′10″E
Tarcombe	Cobar Shire	32°23′41″S 146°05′54″E
Tarran	Cobar Shire	32°27′08″S 146°28′00″E
Thule	Cobar Shire	32°20′44″S 145°42′57″E
Torcobil	Carrathool Shire	33°15′10″S 145°47′00″E
Ulalu	Carrathool Shire	33°08′40″S 146°02′14″E
Ulambong	Cobar Shire	32°25′2.6″S 146°02′3,5″E
Ulumba	Carrathool Shire	32°48′20″S 145°35′05″E
Urambie	Cobar Shire	32°46′30″S 146°27′27″E
Urambie East	Cobar Shire	32°45′30″S 146°34′15″E
Uranaway	Carrathool Shire	33°18′10″S 145°53′18″E
Victor	Cobar Shire	32°38′38″S 145°49′44″E
Wagga	Cobar Shire	32°37′44″S 145°45′21″E
Walla Wollong	Cobar Shire	32°49′10″S 146°22′03″E
Wallandra	Carrathool Shire	33°11′19″S 145°40′32″E
Warbreccan	Cobar Shire	32°24′36″S 145°34′43″E
Warrabillong	Cobar Shire	32°48′50″S 146°32′08″E
West Uabba	Carrathool Shire	33°15′30″S 146°00′03″E
Whoey	Cobar Shire	33°10′35″S 146°18′15″E
Wilga	Carrathool Shire	33°12′28″S 145°47′35″E
Yackerboon	Cobar Shire	32°23′14″S 145°48′18″E
Yara	Cobar Shire	32°49′44″S 146°02′25″E
Yara East	Cobar Shire	32°54′53″S 146°06′17″E
Yathong	Cobar Shire	unknown

(*) The Parish of Illewong should not be confused with the former mining village of Illewong, nearer to Cobar, in the neighbouring Robinson County.
