= Matakana (disambiguation) =

Matakana is a town in New Zealand.

Matakana may also refer to:

== Australia ==
- Matakana, New South Wales
- Matakana South, New South Wales

== New Zealand ==
- Matakana Island
- Matakana River
- Matakana (electorate)
