= Mount Hope railway line =

Former railway line in New South Wales

The Mount Hope railway briefly connected the Broken Hill railway line with Mount Hope, New South Wales, Australia. The copper mine for which this branch was constructed to service ceased full-time operations four months before the line was opened. After a bare five years, the branch itself was closed—possibly the first step of rationalisation to be practiced by the New South Wales Government Railways.

== Construction ==
The basic reason for the proposed construction of a railway to service Mount Hope was to provide a means of cheap transport for the several copper mines in the district. A railway to link Broken Hill with Condobolin via Menindee had been on the drawing boards since 1895 but there was considerable pressure instead for the line to be built from Cobar and run via Wilcannia to Broken Hill. Construction, however, was authorised of the route from Condobolin to Broken Hill in 1912, and the actual work commenced in December 1914 from both ends. The work was placed in the hands of a private contractor in July the following year, but this contract was cancelled in May 1917, by which time the section from Condobolin to Matakana had been completed. Although not officially open for traffic, freight was handled over the line under "construction" conditions (i.e., construction traffic had priority over any other traffic.)

The Annual Report of the Department of Mines for the Year Ended 30 June 1917 reveals that the only mine operating at Mount Hope at the time was the Mount Hope Limited. Regular crushing operations were commenced in May 1917 when the railway from Condobolin to Matakana was unofficially opened. At that stage, it was proposed to build a light railway to connect the mine with Matakana Siding, 16 km away, for which a survey had been completed.

In the following year, the N.S.W. Department of Mines reported that: "the profitable and successful treatment of the Mount Hope ore has proved in the past an almost insuperable difficulty, owing, firstly, to the distance from the railway, and secondly, to the highly siliceous nature of the ore; but the present Company, by a combination process of milling and leaching under a patent of their own, has proved that the mine can be worked profitably and with the railway now within less than two miles of the town, the future of this property seems assured ... given an adequate price for copper, it is safe to predict a prosperous career for this mine."

It was planned to carry out extensive improvements, including the construction of an urgently needed dam to provide a dependable water supply. At this stage, 117 persons were employed at the mine. However, in October 1918, the water ran out and work at the mine all but ceased. With the arrival of the railway, it was expected that the Great Central Copper Mine at South Mount Hope would also resume operations.

The official opening date of the 16.73 km (10m. 32ch.) single tracked branch from Matakana to Mount Hope is given as 10 February 1919, the same as that for the main line from Condobolin to a dead-end 2.56 km beyond Trida.

== Description of the Line ==

The Mount Hope line branched off the western end of the crossing loop at Matakana. This meant that any train proceeding to the branch would have to shunt from the platform as this only faced the main line. The branch left the crossing loop by a 10.57m (12 ch) radius curve to head in a generally northern direction on a steadily rising grade with a few sweeping curves. As the line was unfenced, an overall speed limit of 24 km/h (15 mph) was applied. There were no intermediate halts or stations and the terminus was of the simplest design possible - a main line with a single run-round siding 131 m (431 ft) in length, capable of holding twenty four-wheeled vehicles. No platform or signals were provided at Mount Hope - just a simple station nameboard. Only one train at a time was allowed on the branch operating under "Ordinary Train Staff" regulations. The "Staff" for the section, when not in use, was kept at Matakana. No signals were provided to protect Matakana from trains off the Mount Hope branch and so drivers of these trains had to come to a stand clear of the catch-points protecting the arrival road (loop) at the junction station. Also, as there were no turning facilities at Mount Hope, locomotives had to operate tender-first in one direction. It would appear that it was expected that locomotives would be able to run from Euabalong West (the last watering point) to Mount Hope and return, a distance of 126 km (78½ miles), without requiring additional water, but if none was available at Euabalong West, provision was made in the local instructions for a bogie water tank to be conveyed from Condobolin and for the locomotive to run tender first on the outward journey, propelling the water tank from Euabalong West.

== Train Operations ==
It seems that the railway may have been too late for the copper mining industry which was also suffering from drought conditions. The 1920 Mines Department Annual Report tells us that no ore was mined at Mount Hope during the year although 40 tons were obtained from tailings. Only eleven men were employed, all on surface work. 1921 saw a very depressed copper industry. Whilst 1290 tons had been mined in the whole of New South Wales in 1920, only 499 tons had been mined in 1921, and none of this copper came from Mount Hope.

Travelling time for all trains in each direction on the branch was 46 minutes. Locomotives of the A, B, C, D, H, J.483 & P classes were allowed on the line which was treated as a "pioneer" branch - unfenced, and so drivers were expected to keep a sharp look-out for livestock.

The Public Timetable of 1923 reveals that there was a once-a-week service to Mount Hope, originating from Condobolin at 14.30 on Fridays, connecting off the 1955 mail train from Sydney the previous day. The mixed train departed Matakana at 18.50 and was scheduled to arrive at Mount Hope at 19.35. The return journey was commenced at 6.30 on Saturday, arriving back at Condobolin at 11.10 with a connection through to Sydney.

== Closure ==
When it was obvious that the copper mines would not re-open, and that there was no other worthwhile traffic to retain the branch, it was decided to close the line and accordingly the last train ran on Friday-Saturday 4–5 July 1924.

It appears that the track was allowed to lie unused for many years, not being lifted until the late 1930s when it was recovered for use on another line to serve a copper mine - from Bungendore to Captains Flat.
