= Central NSW Mallee Important Bird Area =

Important Bird Area in New South Wales, Australia

Coordinates: 32°49′45″S 145°42′17″E

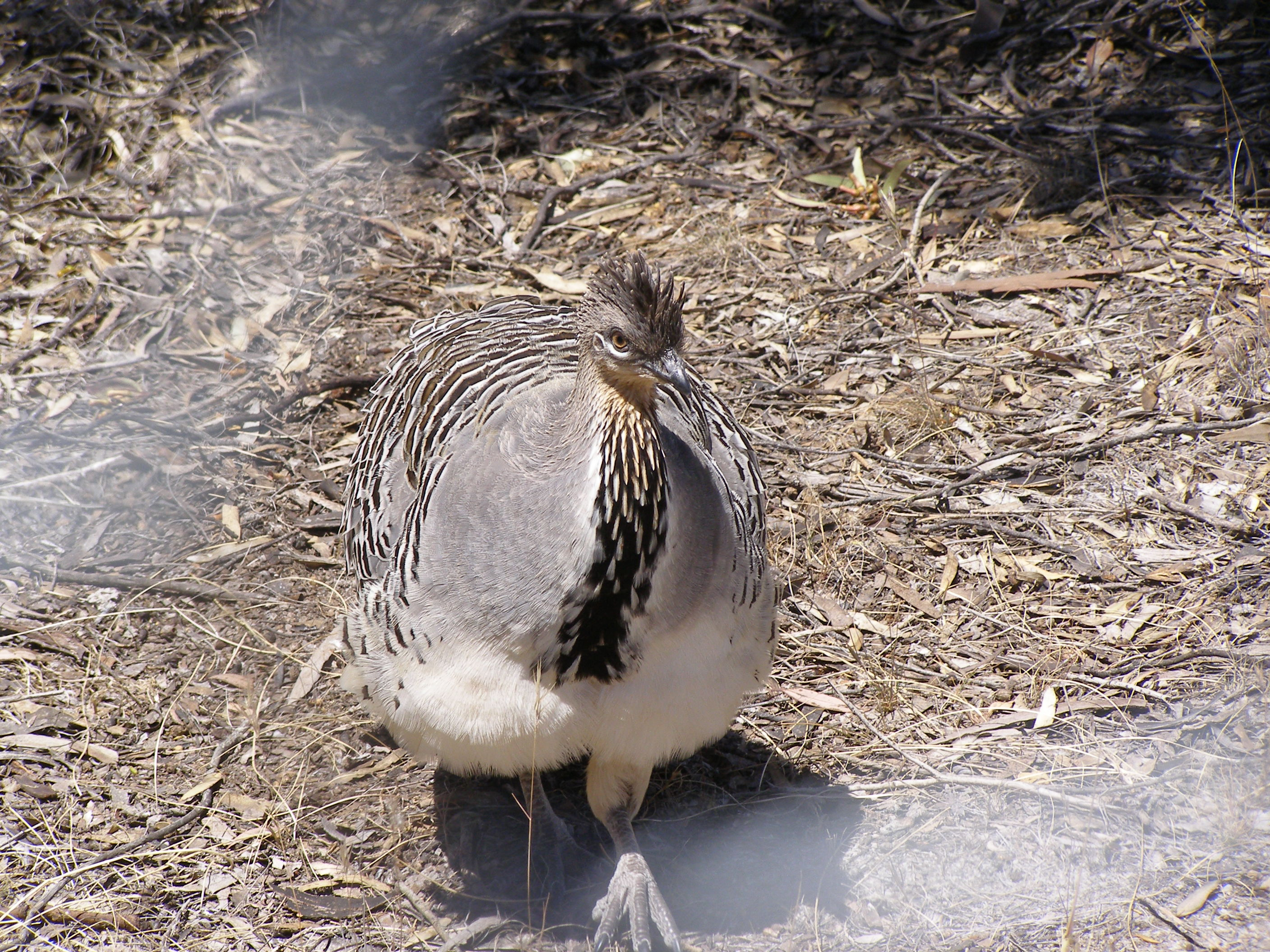
The Central NSW Mallee IBA is important for malleefowl conservation

The Central NSW Mallee Important Bird Area is an irregularly shaped 2500 km^{2} tract of land in western New South Wales, Australia. It lies near the small town of Mount Hope and comprises the nature reserves of Yathong, Nombinnie and Round Hill, with some unreserved crown land, containing remnant mallee woodland and shrubland habitat. It was identified and classified as an Important Bird Area (IBA) because it supports isolated key populations of the malleefowl (with from 250 to 500 individuals present) and the red-lored whistler (with up to 68 breeding pairs). It is also at the centre of distribution in New South Wales for other mallee bird species, including the shy heathwren, striated grasswren, southern scrub-robin and chestnut quail-thrush.

== See also ==
- Riverland Mallee Important Bird Area
- Southern NSW Mallee Important Bird Area
