= Mount Allen, New South Wales =

Former mining village now a ghost town in New South Wales, Australia

Coordinates: 32°41′31.9″S 145°51′55.7″E

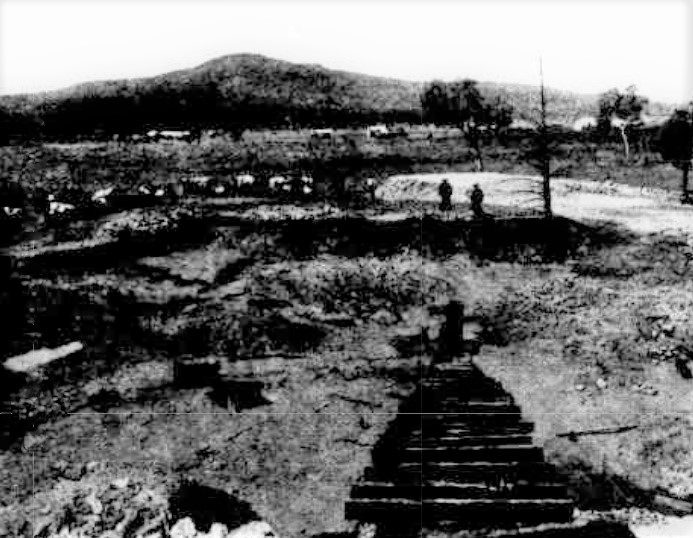
Mount Allen mine looking east c. 1901.

Mount Allen is a ghost town in the Orana region of New South Wales, Australia. There was once a village of the same name associated with gold mining. For statistical purposes, it is considered part of Mount Hope.

== Location ==
The former gold mining village was located approximately 4 km west of Kidman Way, between Mount Hope and Gilgunnia on the route to Cobar. The closest remaining settlement is Mount Hope.

The landform, Mount Allen, is some distance to the south of the former village. So the village may equally have taken its name from the Parish of Mount Allen or the Mount Allen gold mine.

== History ==
=== Aboriginal and early settler history ===
The area which later became the village of Mount Allen lies on the traditional lands of Wangaaypuwan dialect speakers (also known as Wangaibon) of Ngiyampaa people. After settlers took over the district, it lay across the boundary of Mount Allen and the Coree parishes, within Blaxland County.

=== Mount Allen Gold Mine ===
In the early 1880s as the mining of copper ore was being established at nearby Mount Hope, a small copper mine was opened at Mount Allen. In November 1882 the Mount Allen copper mine, seven miles north-west of Mount Hope, was described as a holding with "very good indications of copper" which had not yet "been developed to any extent to prove its value".

The gold field was dominated by Mount Allen Gold-Mining Company's mine. Prior to the opening of that mine, Gossan ironstone was mined at Mt Allen and used as flux in the smelters at Mount Hope. The ironstone showed the presence of gold. By August 1891, sampling had produced satisfactory results, the mine had been sold to a syndicate of investors, and machinery was in the process of being erected. Operations had ceased by March 1894, due to lack of water to run the 20-head stamper battery. The mine struck clean clear water, at 114 feet depth, in April 1894 At first, the flow was 100 gallons per hour, and the water was welcomed; when the mine reached 138 feet in depth, it was necessary to install pumps to remove over 800 gallons of water per hour. In July 1895, the shaft was "flooded out". In October 1895, the mine office and manager's residence were destroyed by fire. A second shaft was sunk in 1897.

Around February 1898, poor grades led to the end of mining and the decision to erect a cyanide plant to reprocess tailings. From February 1899 to March 1900, tailings were reprocessed to extract residual gold. That seems to have been the end of the operations. By 1901, machinery from the mine had been relocated to another mine at Mount Hope. In 1909, the mine was briefly worked by tribute miners, until a winding engine accident occurred. In 1938, the last use of the mine was as a water supply in time of drought. As late as the 1940s, there was talk of mining resuming, but it came to nothing

=== Mining village ===
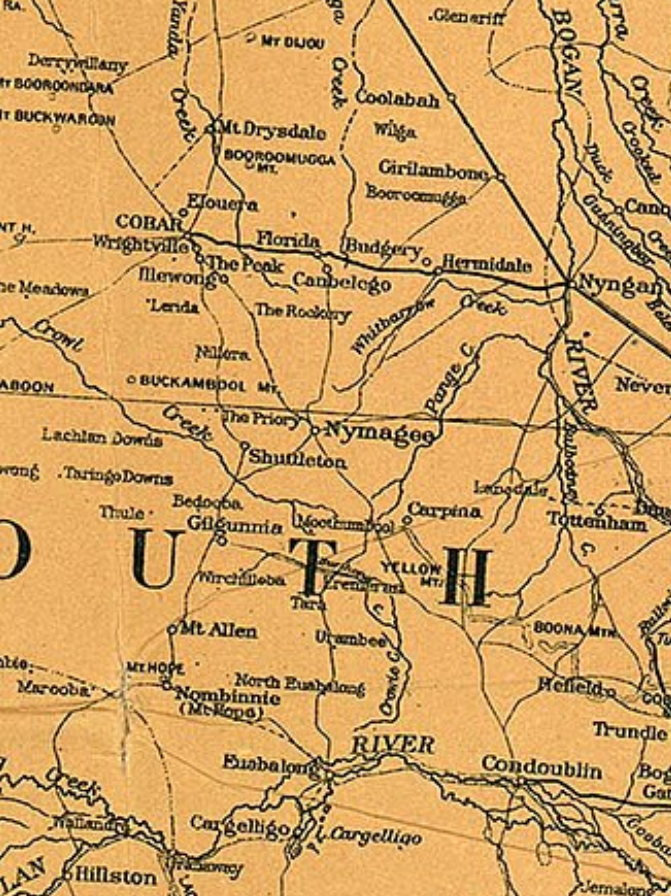
Map showing Mount Allen (1916)

An informal settlement sprang up near the mine, which had a population of 200 by the end of 1893. A village was not officially proclaimed until 22 October 1896. Land was reserved for public and government buildings, public recreation, and as a common for residents' use. These grandiose plans were never completed and Mount Allen was a short-lived settlement.

There was a school at Mount Allen—known as Double Peak, after a landform that lay closer to the village site than the Mount Allen landform—from July 1895 to December 1900.

By April 1898, just after mining ceased, it was described as seeming "entirely abandoned, there being only a few habitations occupied." Building allotments in the village became worthless within a few years. Some of the now lost streets of the former village were Cobar, Hope, Abbott, Carruthers, Copeland, Reid and Fulton streets. The village had a market garden operated by ethic-Chinese. The village effectively ceased to exist officially in 1939, when most of its land area was reallocated to the neighbouring pastoral holding, from which it had been excised originally.

== Remnants ==
There is now nothing left of the settlement except its cemetery, which lies slightly to the north-west of the former village's site, and the remnants of the gold mine. The former village's site is no longer accessible to the general public. The topographic map of the area, including nearby Mount Hope, is known as Mount Allen.
