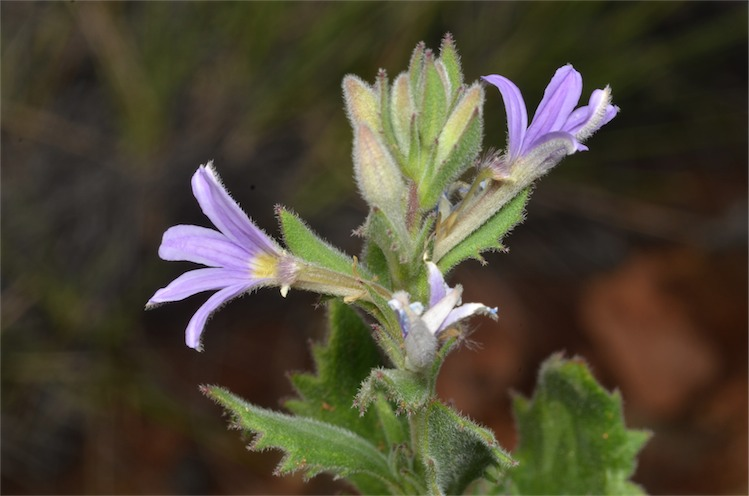

Scientific classification
- Kingdom: Plantae
- Clade: Embryophytes
- Clade: Tracheophytes
- Clade: Spermatophytes
- Clade: Angiosperms
- Clade: Eudicots
- Clade: Asterids
- Order: Asterales
- Family: Goodeniaceae
- Genus: Scaevola
- Species: S. humilis

Binomial name
- Scaevola humilis R.Br.
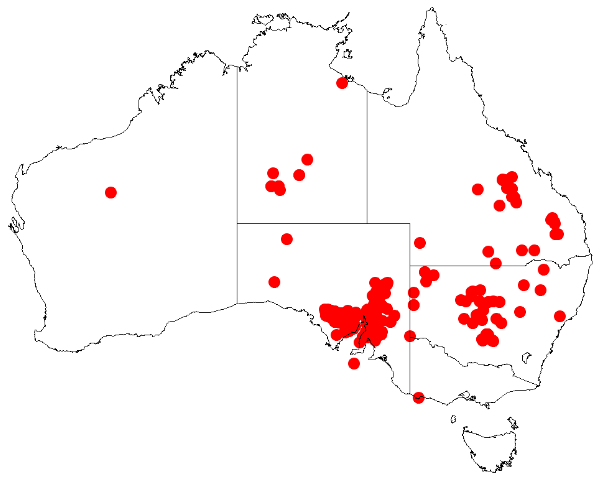
- Occurrence data from AVH

Synonyms
- Lobelia humilis (R.Br.) Kuntze nom. illeg.; Merkusia humilis (R.Br.) de Vriese; Scaevola aemula auct. non R.Br.: Black, J.M. & Robertson, E.L. (1957), Flora of South Australia

= Scaevola humilis =

Species of shrub

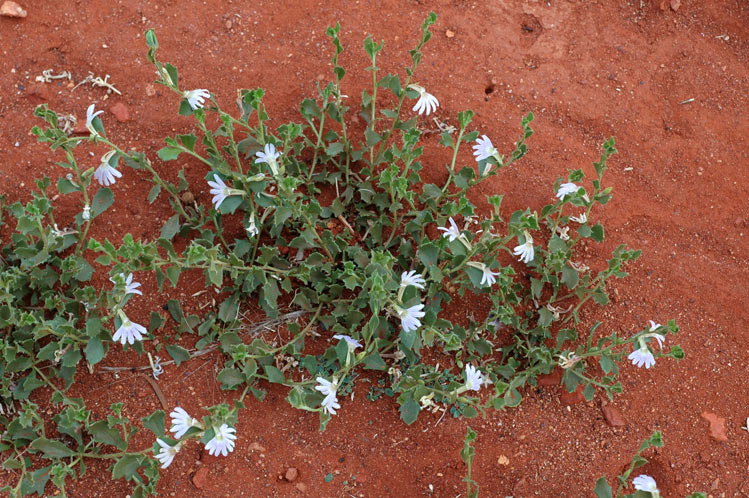
Habit in the Yathong Nature Reserve

Scaevola humilis is a species of flowering plant in the family Goodeniaceae and is endemic to arid areas of Australia. It is a low-lying or ascending herb with elliptic to narrowly egg-shaped leaves with the narrower end towards the base, spikes of blue or white flowers and hairy fruit.

== Description ==
Scaevola humilis is a low-lying or ascending herb that typically grows to a height of 35 cm (14 in), has a woody base and is covered with fine, soft hairs or is almost glabrous. Its leaves are elliptic to narrowly egg-shaped with the narrower end towards the base, 10–50 mm (0.39–1.97 in) long, 4–17 mm (0.16–0.67 in) wide, the edges coarsely toothed. The flowers are borne in spikes up to 150 mm (5.9 in) long, with leaf-like bracts and narrowly elliptic to lance-shaped bracteoles 6–9 mm (0.24–0.35 in) long. The sepals are fused at the base, broadly egg-shaped, 0.6 mm (0.024 in) long. The petals are blue or white, 12–23 mm (0.47–0.91 in) long, hairy on the outside, and densely hairy in the throat with wings up to 1.5 mm (0.059 in) wide. Flowering mainly occurs from May to October, and the fruit is oval, 3–5 mm (0.12–0.20 in) long, wrinkled and covered with soft hairs.

== Taxonomy ==
Scaevola humilis was first formally described in 1810 by Robert Brown in his Prodromus Florae Novae Hollandiae. The specific epithet (humilis) means 'low' or 'small' in stature.

== Distribution and habitat ==
This species of scaevola grows in rocky or gravelly ranges in arid areas in the Northern Territory, South Australia, New South Wales north from Griffith and west from Dubbo and Boggabri and Queensland.

== Conservation status ==
Scaevola humilis is listed as 'least concern' under the Queensland Government Nature Conservation Act 1992.
