= Leioproctus badius =

Scientific classification
- Kingdom: Animalia
- Phylum: Arthropoda
- Clade: Pancrustacea
- Class: Insecta
- Order: Hymenoptera
- Family: Colletidae
- Genus: Leioproctus
- Species: L. badius

Binomial name
- Leioproctus badius Maynard 2013

Synonyms
- Goniocolletes badius Maynard, 2013

Species of bee

Leioproctus badius, or Leioproctus (Goniocolletes) badius, is a species of bee in the family Colletidae and subfamily Colletinae. It is endemic to Australia. It was described by Australian entomologist Glynn Maynard in 2013.

== Etymology ==
The specific epithet badius (Latin: "reddish") refers to the colour of the metasoma.

== Description ==
Female body length is about 9 mm, male body length 9 mm. Integumental colouration is mainly black, the metasoma orange with black patches. The hair is white to pale yellow.

== Distribution and habitat ==
The species occurs in inland south-eastern Queensland. The type locality is 5 km north-east of Springsure.

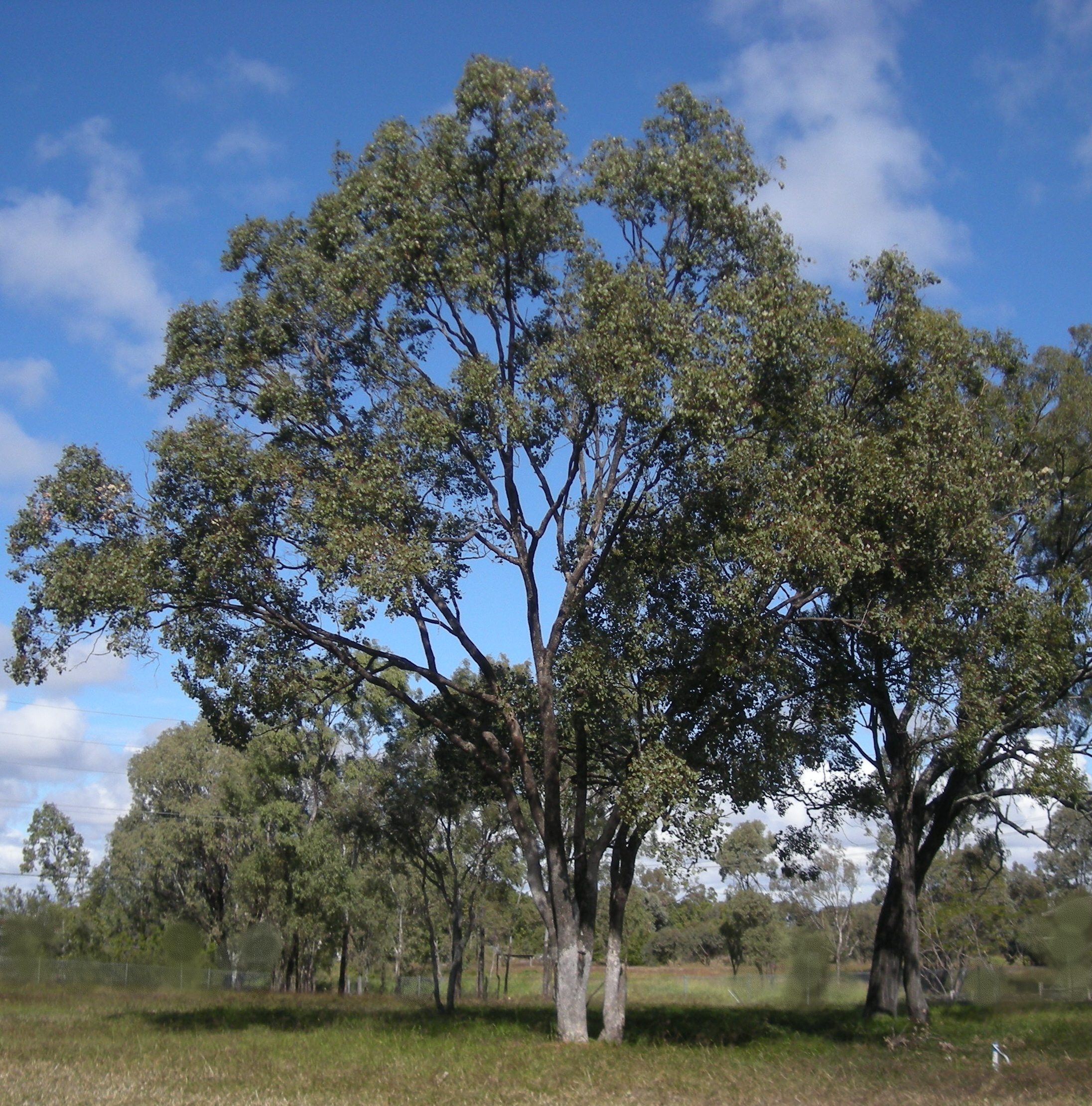
Eucalyptus populnea tree (bimble box), a forage plant of the bees

== Behaviour ==
The adults are flying mellivores. Flowering plants visited by the bees include Eucalyptus camaldulensis and Eucalyptus populnea.

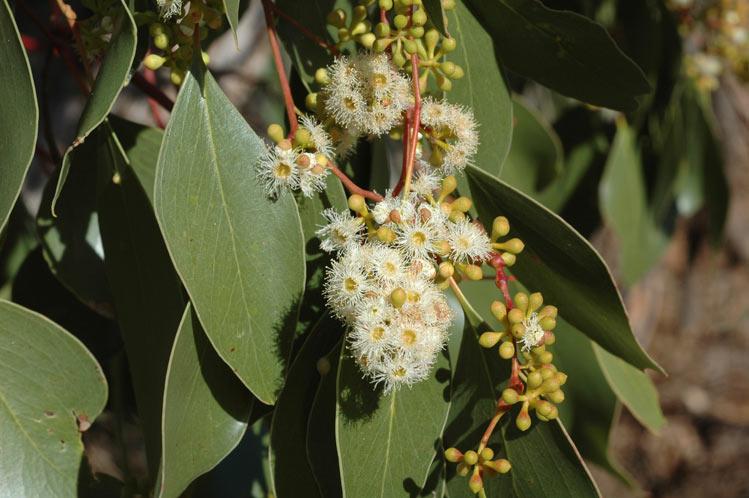
Flowers of Eucalyptus populnea (bimble box), a forage plant of the bees
