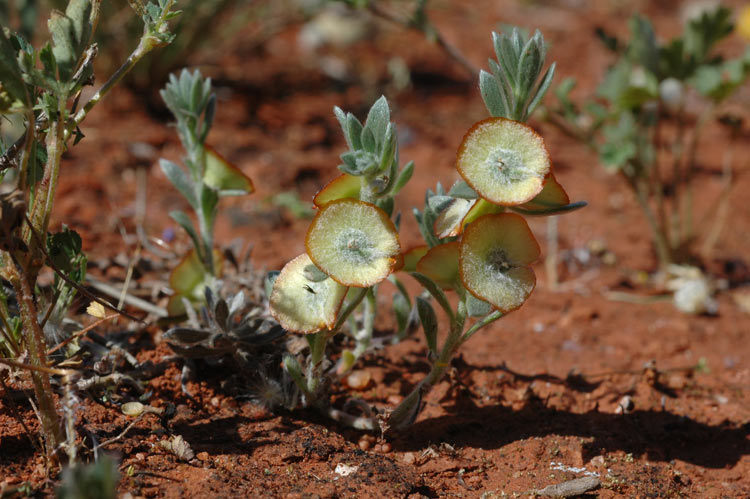
- In Yathong Nature Reserve

Scientific classification
- Kingdom: Plantae
- Clade: Tracheophytes
- Clade: Angiosperms
- Clade: Eudicots
- Order: Caryophyllales
- Family: Amaranthaceae
- Genus: Maireana
- Species: M. humillima

Binomial name
- Maireana humillima (F.Muell.) Paul G.Wilson

Synonyms
- Kochia humillima F.Muell.

= Maireana humillima =

Species of plant

Maireana humillima is a species of flowering plant in the family Amaranthaceae and is endemic to eastern Australia. It is a low, spreading perennial plant with hairy branches, narrowly elliptic to narrowly egg-shaped or narrowly lance-shaped leaves with the narrower end towards the base, bisexual flowers arranged singly, and a glabrous fruiting perianth with a simple, circular wing that is woolly on its upper surface.

== Description ==
Maireana humillima is a low, spreading perennial plant with hairy branches up to 20 cm (7.9 in) long. Its leaves are arranged alternately, narrowly elliptic to narrowly egg-shaped or narrowly lance-shaped with the narrower end towards the base, 5–15 mm (0.20–0.59 in) long with shaggy light brown hairs pressed against the surface. The flowers are arranged singly with a pair of narrowly egg-shaped bracteoles about 1.5 mm (0.059 in) long at the base. The fruiting perianth is glabrous apart from the woolly hairy upper side of the wing with a cup-shaped tube 1.5–2.0 mm (0.059–0.079 in) long. The wings is simple, circular, horizontal but thin, about 12 mm (0.47 in) in diameter.

== Taxonomy ==
This species was first described in 1875 by Ferdinand von Mueller who gave it the name Kochia humillima in his Fragmenta Phytographiae Australiae from specimens he collected near the Murray, Murrumbidgee, Campaspe and Edwards. In 1975, Paul G. Wilson transferred the species to Maireana as M. humillima in the journal Nuytsia. The specific epithet (humillima) means 'the lowest' or 'smallest'.

== Distribution and habitat ==
This species of Maireana usually grows in heavy soil and is found in Queensland, and the western slopes and plains of New South Wales to southern Victoria.
