= Southern NSW Mallee Important Bird Area =

Important Bird Area in New South Wales, Australia

Coordinates: 33°57′17″S 142°54′14″E

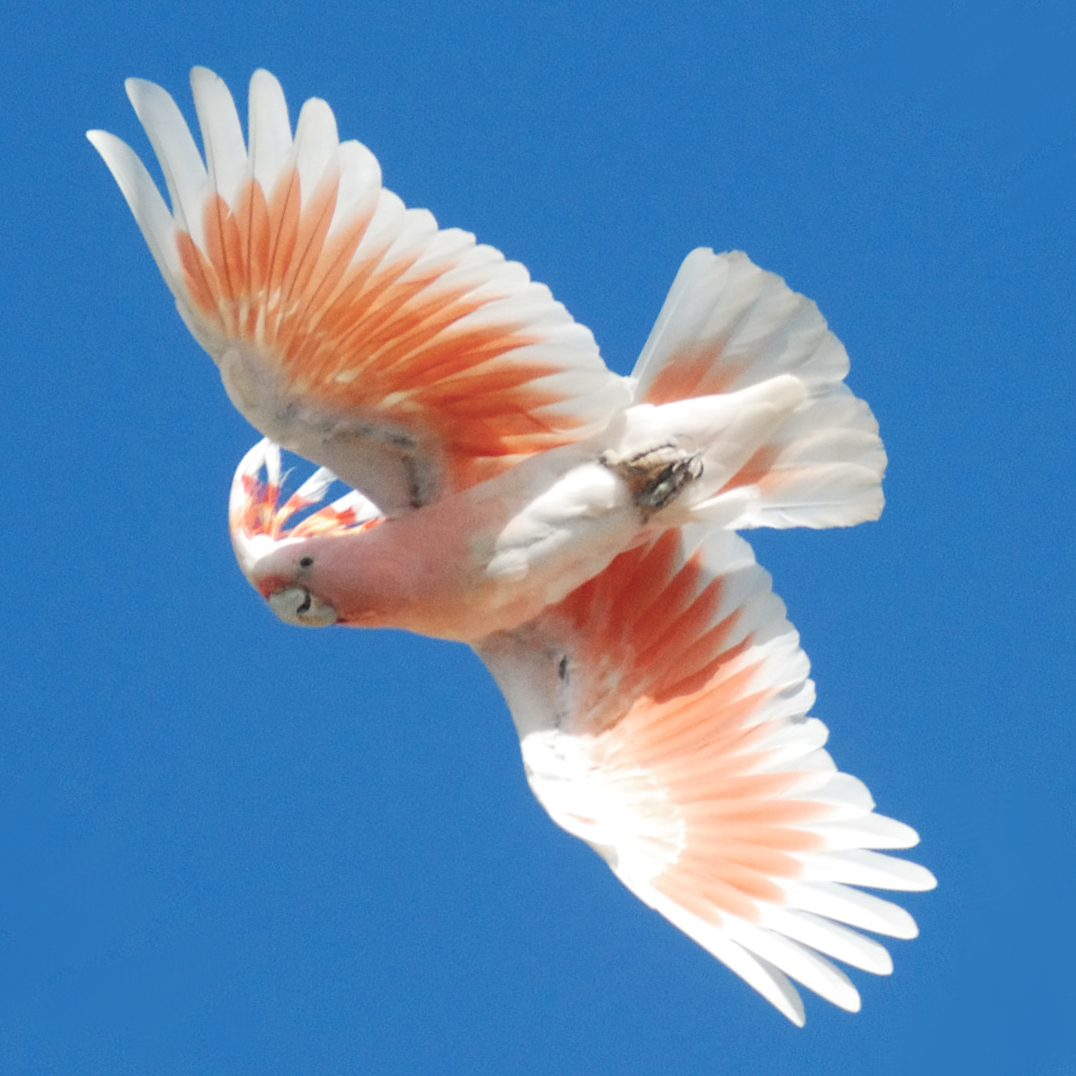
Major Mitchell's cockatoos inhabit the IBA

The Southern NSW Mallee Important Bird Area comprises an irregularly shaped 8232 km^{2} tract of land in south-western New South Wales, Australia. It is roughly bounded by the Murray River in the south, the Darling River in the west, and the Willandra Lakes in the north. It lies north-west of the town of Balranald, north of Robinvale and east of Mildura.

== Description ==
The exact boundaries of the Important Bird Area (IBA) are defined by the presence of remnant mallee woodland and shrubland habitat, excluding areas that have been cleared or support other plant communities. The landscape is mainly mallee on flat or undulating sand plains, much of which is used for grazing. The climate is semi-arid; temperatures range from a mean maximum in January of 33 °C to a July minimum of 4.5 °C; mean annual rainfall is about 280 mm. The site includes several small reserves as well as Mallee Cliffs National Park and part of Mungo National Park.

== Birds ==
The site has been identified by BirdLife International as an IBA because it either is known to support, or contains suitable habitat for, a significant population (estimated at 500 individuals) of the vulnerable malleefowl. Other notable birds recorded in the IBA include flame robins, black and pied honeyeaters, Major Mitchell's cockatoos, purple-crowned lorikeets, regent parrots, shy heathwrens, southern scrub-robins, hooded robins, chestnut quail-thrushes and Gilbert's whistlers.

== See also ==
- Central NSW Mallee Important Bird Area
- Riverland Mallee Important Bird Area
