= Gilgunnia =

Locality in New South Wales, Australia

- Town
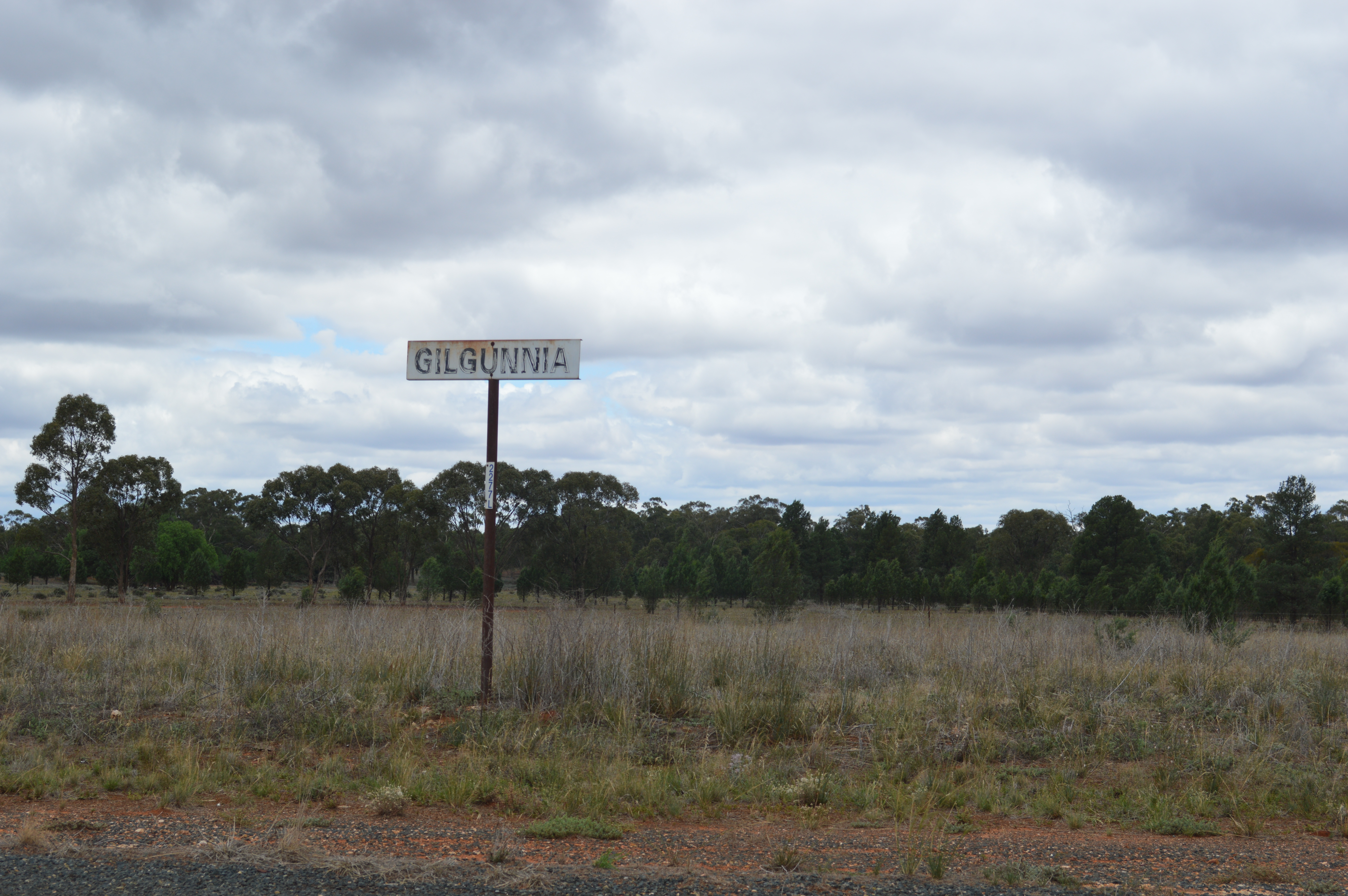
- Road sign at the entry to the site of the former village at Gilgunnia (2017).

- Interactive map of Gilgunnia
- Coordinates: 32°25′02.6″S 146°02′03.5″E
- Country: Australia
- State: New South Wales
- Region: Orana
- LGA: Cobar Shire
- Location: 110 km (68 mi) S of Cobar; 146 km (91 mi) N of Hillston; 592 km (368 mi) WNW of Sydney

Government
  - State electorate: Barwon
  - Federal division: Parkes

Population
  - Total: 0 (2016 census)
- Postcode: 2835
- County: Blaxland
- Parish: Gilgunnia
Localities around Gilgunnia
| | Cobar | Nymagee |
| Irymple | Gilgunnia | Bobadah |
| | Mount Hope | Eremerang |

Gilgunnia is a locality and ghost town in the Orana region of New South Wales, Australia, within the Parish of South Peak in Blaxland County and Cobar Shire. It was once a settlement associated with gold mining, but in 2016 its population was zero. The nearest settlements are Mount Hope (51 km south) and Nymagee (73 km north-east).

== Location ==
It is located 592 km west-north-west of Sydney, 110 km south of Cobar, and 146 km north of Hillston. The former village was located near the intersections of Kidman Way (linking Hillston and Cobar) with Glenwood Road (from Nymagee) and Grain Road (from Euabalong), due east of the landform known as South Peak.

== History ==
=== Aboriginal and early settler history ===
The area now known as Gilgunnia lies on the traditional lands of Wangaaypuwan dialect speakers (also known as Wangaibon) of Ngiyampaa people. The area is west of the traditional lands of Wiradjuri, which extend to around Condoblin. The name Gilgunnia is of Aboriginal origin and said to mean "swamp with aborigines' huts around it". There was once a spring (now dry) in the area, providing permanent water in a semi-arid area and that is probably why the area was called Gilgunnia. The spring would have been important to its traditional owners and also of great interest to settlers moving onto their traditional lands. By 1907, there were no Aboriginal people recorded as living at Gilgunnia.

There were settlers in the area from the 1860s, the Kruge family. Henry Kruge was a native of Sandefjord, in Norway, who arrived in Adelaide in 1852. In 1858, he married Sidwell Woodcock. After working as a hawker, Henry and his wife settled at what later became known as 'Old Gilgunnia'.

In 1870, Gilgunnia and the Kruges played a small part in the discovery of the immense copper deposits at Cobar. Three well and bore sinkers, Hartman, Campbell (a.k.a. Kempf) and Gibb, took samples, from an outcrop of what was later the Great Cobar lode. They showed those samples to Sidwell Kruge—a woman of Cornish origin, previously residing in the South Australian copper-mining town of Burra—who identified the ores as containing copper. Later, at Gilgunnia, Henry Kruge, smelted some of the ore samples in a blacksmith's forge to prove beyond doubt that the ore contained copper.

A hotel was established in 1873, called the Gilgunnia Hotel; its founder envisaged it as a stopping place, north of the Lachlan River, on the travelling stock route, midway between the Murray River and the Darling at Bourke. A small settlement came into being, as the hotel owner, Henry Kruge, also provided other services as a blacksmith and wheelwright, and sold provisions. Cypress pines grew in the area and Kruge set up a sawmill to exploit the resource. In 1878, a post office opened at the hotel. The original settlement was about three miles to the west of the later site of Gilgunnia.

Small amounts of alluvial gold had been found in the area around 1887. However, it was the discovery of a quartz reef, by Aboriginal prospector John 'Jackey' Owen, in April 1895, that led to the establishment of a new settlement. (Owen was not the 'Jacky' buried in the local cemetery in 1906.)

=== Mining village ===
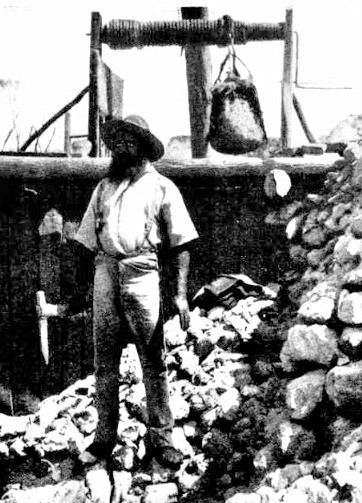
John 'Jackey' Owen, Aboriginal man, prospector, discoverer of reef gold at Gilgunnia, who later found copper ore at Shuttleton.

The new settlement, later Gilgunnia, was at first called "the diggings" or informally 'New Gilgunnia'. The earlier settlement became known as 'Old Gilgunnia'. The old Gilgunnia Hotel became a homestead that survived, until 1976 when it was destroyed by fire.

Within months of the discovery of the quartz reef, an unplanned tent village of 500 inhabitants had sprung up. Unfortunately, some of it was situated upon land reserved for a travelling stock route and part was too close to the mining leases, not in the area that was being planned—in far-away Sydney—as the village. Within a year of the discovery, the village had three hotels, eight stores, four stables, two halls—one being used as a school—sixteen slab huts, five cottages, eleven log huts, 31 weatherboard huts, and one iron hut.

A proclamation on 15 December 1896 brought the unofficial village under government control and the planned village of Gilgunnia was officially proclaimed on 20 January 1897. Land was sold in the village in late June 1897 and early January 1907. Some of the streets were Collins, Fulton, Victor and Skipper streets; some other streets were Owen, Wirchillaba, Nymagee, and Delaney streets. Owen Street is probably one of the first streets to be named after an indigenous person. The village had a public school from 1896 to 1907.

Unlike the other western goldfields, at Canbelego and Wrightville, the gold mines of Gilgunnia were relatively small scale operations. There were numerous small mines in close proximity to the village but there was also a separate smaller mining area, due east of the village, known as "the Four Mile".

A stamper battery was installed to crush the reef quartz. This operation required water, which in short supply in this arid region. An in-ground water storage, known as the Battery Tank was excavated to capture rain water. Crushing operations on occasion were suspended pending rain.

An ethnic-Chinese market gardener, 'Charley' Chin set up a market garden, on the common land just outside the village and supplied the village with fresh fruit and vegetables, an incredible feat in a semi-arid area. He painstakingly dug an in-ground 'tank' to store precious water for the garden, using only hand implements and a wooden wheelbarrow. If he had a surplus of produce, he was known to carry it by bicycle to Mount Hope, returning in time to water his crops at least weekly.

The most significant of the mines was the 'Her Dream'. Paradoxically, in 1909, it was excessive flows of water into that mine that prevented its being mined to greater depth. Another attempt was made to mine the lease, in 1913, but it ended in failure. The other mines were smaller operations and not able to sustain Gilgunnia as it was. For miners in a semi-arid area, it was a cruel fate that, at depth, the mines filled with groundwater, impacting the economic viability of the remote gold field. Very little significant mining took place thereafter, and there was no longer a stamper battery operating at Gilgunnia.

In 1924, the lease of the remaining hotel, Tattersall's Hotel, was taken over by Robert 'Bobby' Nelson, who also had a lease to graze cattle on the village common lands. Nelson cancelled the hotel licence, preferring to operate the building as a store. By 1932, the old hotel also served as the post office. and, by 1935, the population had fallen to around 40.

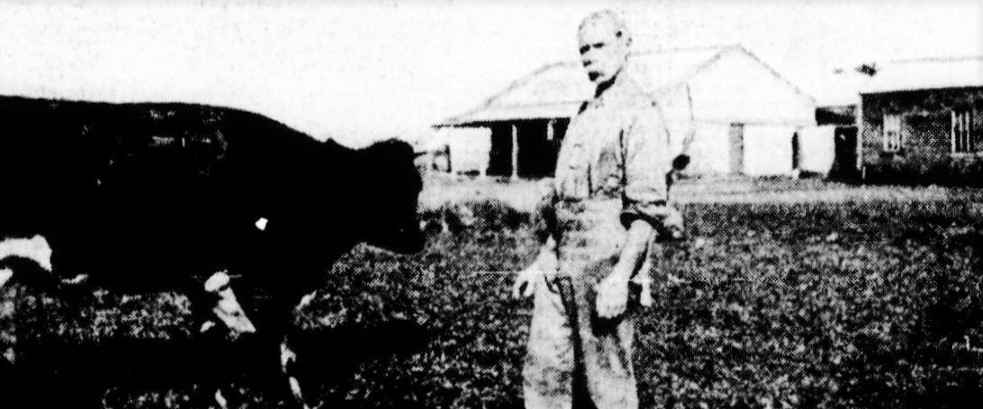
'All that is left of Gilgunnia' c.1927. The man shown is most likely long-term resident 'Bobby' Nelson.

All organised mining activity in the area had ceased, by the end of the 1930s. Although there were people living on nearby grazing properties, the population of the village had fallen to just a few itinerant miners and the two long-time residents, 'Bobby' Nelson and 'Charley' Chin. With other residents departing, after the Second World War began, only these two old men—who sadly did not get on well—remained. Once both became ill and died, during 1942, village life at Gilgunnia effectively ceased. The remaining buildings fell into decay and the village faded away. Mining returned to the area, for a time in the 1990s, when the May Day open-cut mine operated, at a location just south-west of the old village site. The temporary renewal of mining activity did not revive Gilgunnia. In 2016, nobody lived there.

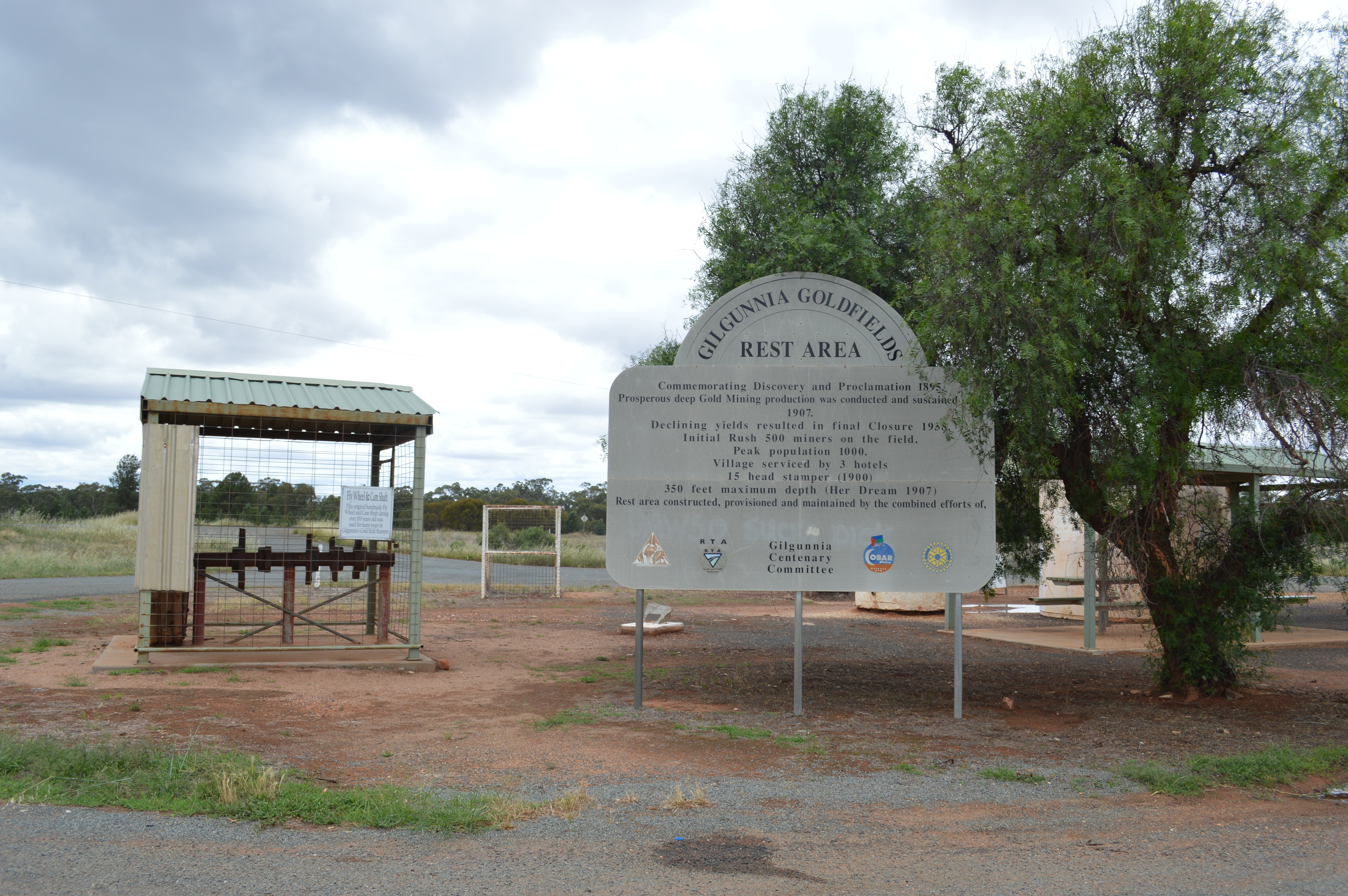
Gilgunnia Goldfields Rest Area (2017)

== Remnants and legacy ==
There are now no buildings left at Gilgunnia and it is not immediately apparent these days why the roads from Cobar, Hillston, Nymagee and Euabalong all meet at this locality. There are some remnants of mining activity, the Battery Tank, and the old market garden. There is also the old village's cemetery. Those buried there include Henry Kruge; his wife, Sidwell who had later remarried, lies in Cobar Cemetery.

There is a rest area on Kidman Way, near the former site of the village, which commemorates Gilgunnia and its former inhabitants. At the rest area, there is also a plaque commemorating the Kruges, the first settlers in the area and founders of Old Gilgunnia.
