= Shuttleton, New South Wales =

Coordinates: 32°7′21″S 146°04′40″E

Shuttleton is an Australian ghost town located in the Parish of Hume, County of Mouramba, New South Wales. The former village site is 29 km (18 miles) west-south-west of Nymagee. The area in which it lies is treated as part of Nymagee for postal and statistical purposes.

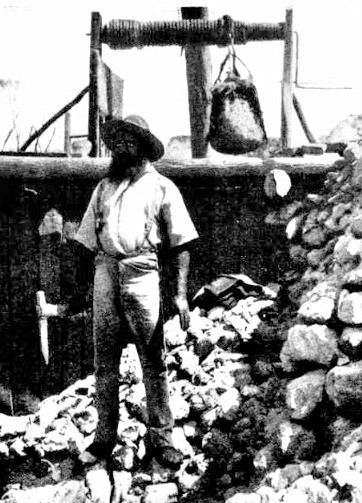
John 'Jacky' Owen, Aboriginal prospector, who discovered copper ore at Shuttleton and reef gold at Gilgunnia.

It was founded in expectation of population growth following the discovery of gold in the district and nearby copper deposits. An outcrop of copper ore was discovered by prospector, John 'Jacky' Owen, an Aboriginal man, in late 1900; he had previously discovered reef gold at Gilgunnia. Owen was either employed by or working in partnership with Thomas Shuttle, who was living in the area as the caretaker of the Government Tank, at Crowl or Sandy Creek—both names were used because "crowl" is derived from the local Aboriginal word meaning "sandy"—a watering place on a travelling stock route. Shuttle is credited as being the co-discoverer and it is he who took out the first mining lease in the area, known as "Shuttle's". However, it was on another lease—held by Eason, Mooney, and Osmetti—further north of the other leases, that the richest discovery was made, in February 1901, creating the need for a permanent settlement.

The new village of Shuttleton was proclaimed on 15 July 1902. The original settlement had been called (informally) Crowl Creek; it was subsequently named Shuttleton, after Thomas Shuttle, who was still exploring his lease in search of copper, around the time that site for the village was selected in 1901. There was a family by the name of Shuttle in the village, for many years afterwards. Thomas Shuttle died, still living in the area, in 1928. It seems that Jacky Owen did not prosper from his discovery but he also lived to an old age.

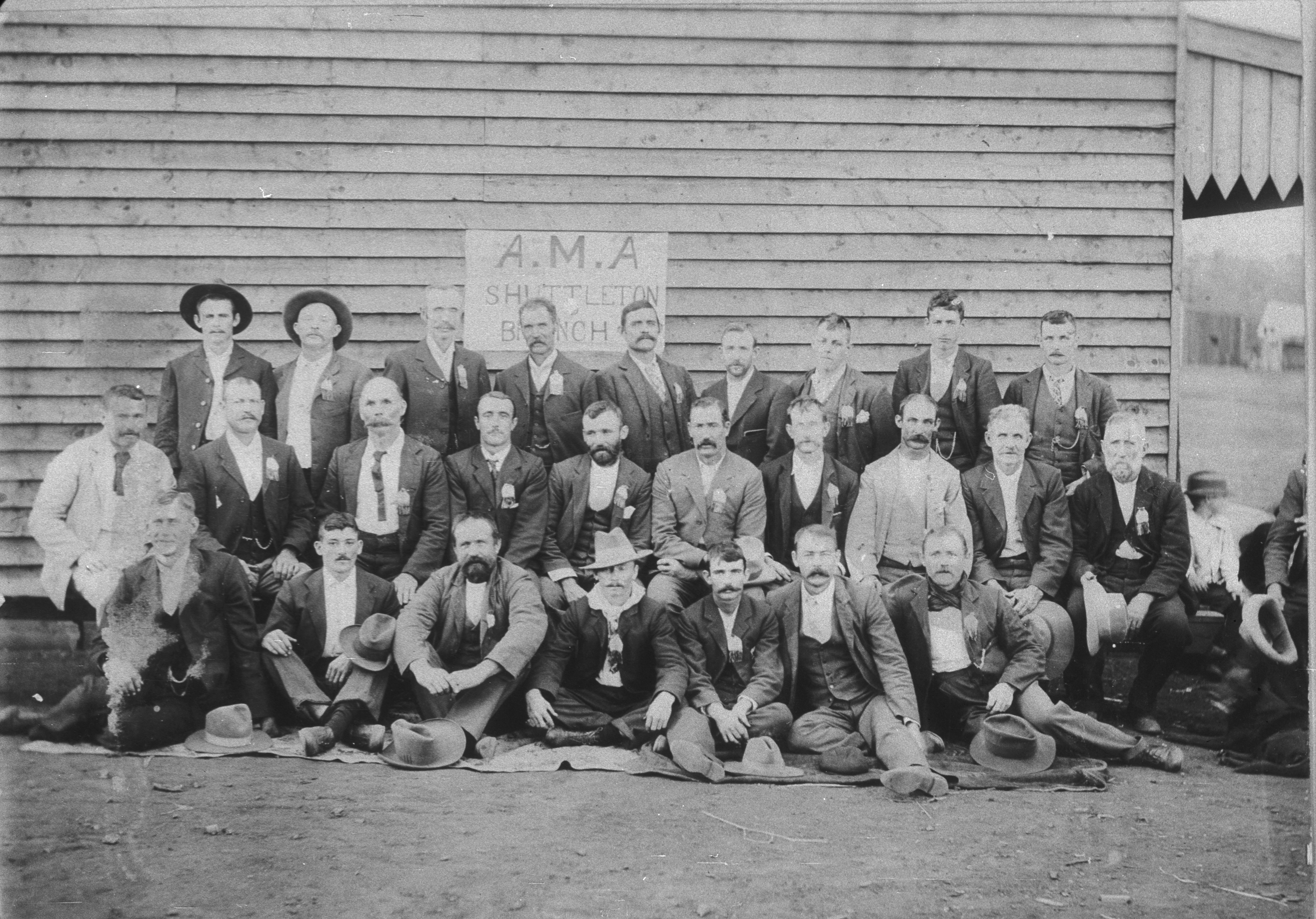
Miners of the Shuttleton Branch of the Amalgamated Miners' Association, date uncertain. (Photo, Kirkham's Studio, Collection of Mitchell Library, State Library of NSW)

By mid-1903, mining was in full swing and reverberatory smelters were under construction. The village had 330 to 350 inhabitants, a post office, police station, public school, two hotels—Tattersall’s Hotel and Commercial Hotel—stores and other businesses. The village had a market garden operated by ethnic-Chinese. A wave of personal bankruptcies in the village suggests that its initial prosperity was short lived. However, by September 1905 there were over 1,000 inhabitants. In 1913, a day of horse racing took place there.

The mines at Shuttleton included the Crowl Creek Copper Mine, also known as the Commonwealth Mine, and the South Shuttleton Mine (later known as the Shuttleton Mine). The Crowl Creek Copper Mine had a smelter. In August 1908, the Crowl Creek and Shuttleton Mines were purchased by Nymagee Copper Limited Co., operator of the copper mine at Nymagee; thereafter, the 'silicaceous' ore from Shuttleton was blended with the 'basic' ore mined at Nymagee to facilitate its smelting, in Nymagee's new water jacket furnaces. The Nymagee operation closed, in 1917, but smelting resumed at Shuttleton in April 1918. The mine and smelter at Shuttleton ceased operating, in mid 1918, leaving only three men working at the mine site and about 100 tons of copper that could not be sold; low copper prices and scarce water made a resumption of mining unlikely. The mines and smelters at both Shuttleton and Nymagee had cost disadvantages, due to their reliance on road transport. There was not, and would never be, a railway to either settlement.

In late 1918, just before the end of the First World War, the village received the news that its former school teacher had been killed in action in France. Another man from Shuttleton had been killed at Gallipoli, in May 1915. In November 1919, a function was held at the village's Oddfellows' Hall, to welcome home three soldiers from Shuttleton.

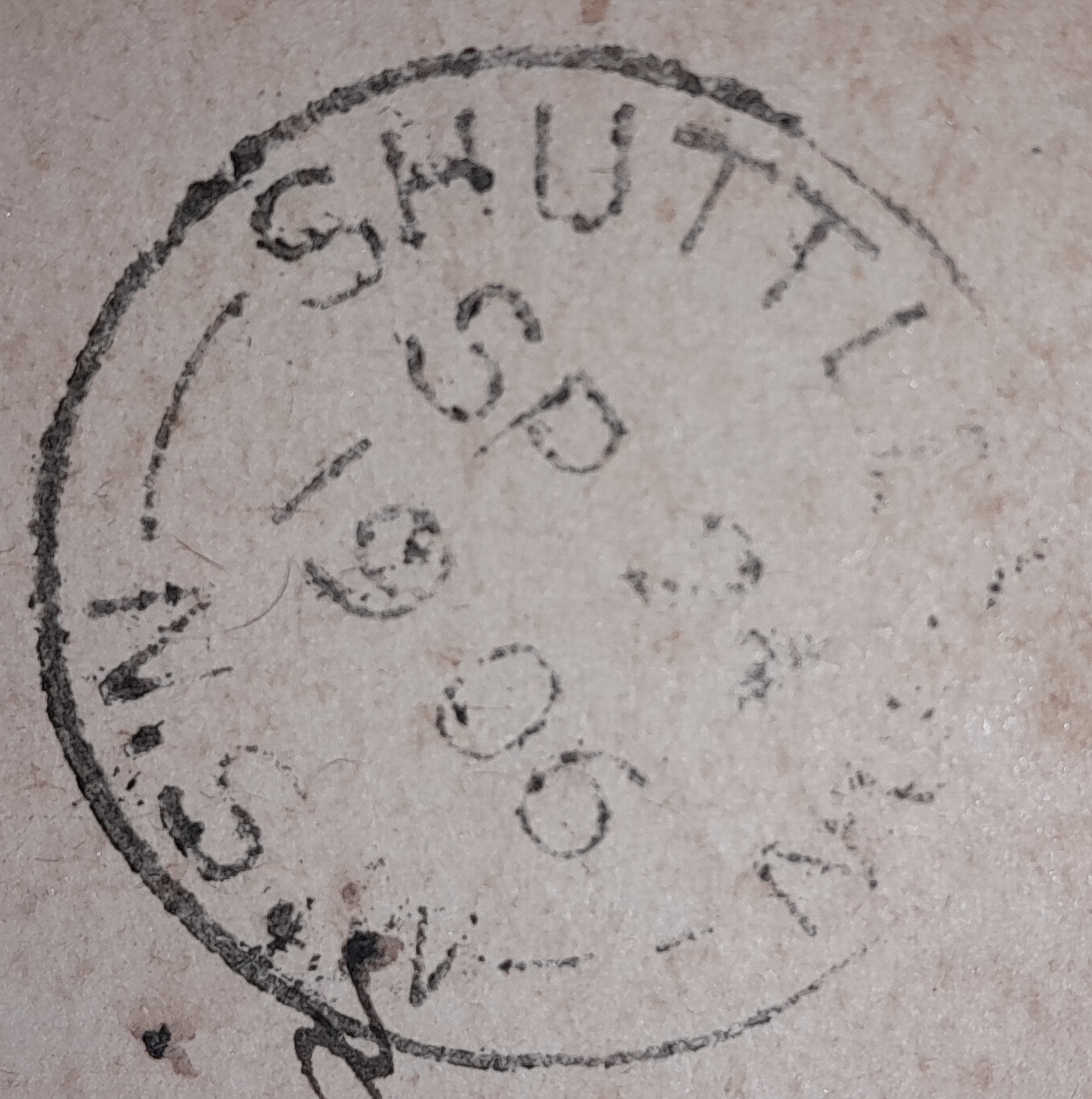
Postmark.

The cessation of mining and smelting, in 1918, led to a steep decline in population. Once the copper mine site closed, finally, in 1920, most of the remaining inhabitants moved away. The school closed in 1920. The last hotel, Tattersall's, also closed in 1920. The last store in the village had already closed, in late 1918. By mid 1923, Shuttleton only had five inhabited houses, with many others being removed. The old church had blown down, and Anglican church services were being conducted, in a disused billiard hall, by the visiting priests of the Brotherhood of the Good Shepherd. The post office closed in late 1928.

The size of the village's area was reduced in 1942 to suit its reduced circumstances. By 1945, it was no longer a polling place. By 1949, its buildings were mainly gone, but it was still significant enough to be, once again, a polling place in 1950. In 1953, the remaining residents of the area erected a steel-framed Anglican church building. In 2006, the old church was being used as a hay storage shed.

Today there is virtually nothing left to show of the former village except its street grid, its 'tank'—an excavated water reservoir— its cemetery, some mine ruins, and an access road—linking Priory Tank Road (from Nymagee) and Kidman Way—called Shuttleton Road.

In recent years, there has been some renewed mineral exploration activity, near the site of the former Star of the West mine (Wirlong prospect) to the east of Shuttleton.
