= Mount Hope, New South Wales =

Mount Hope New South Wales
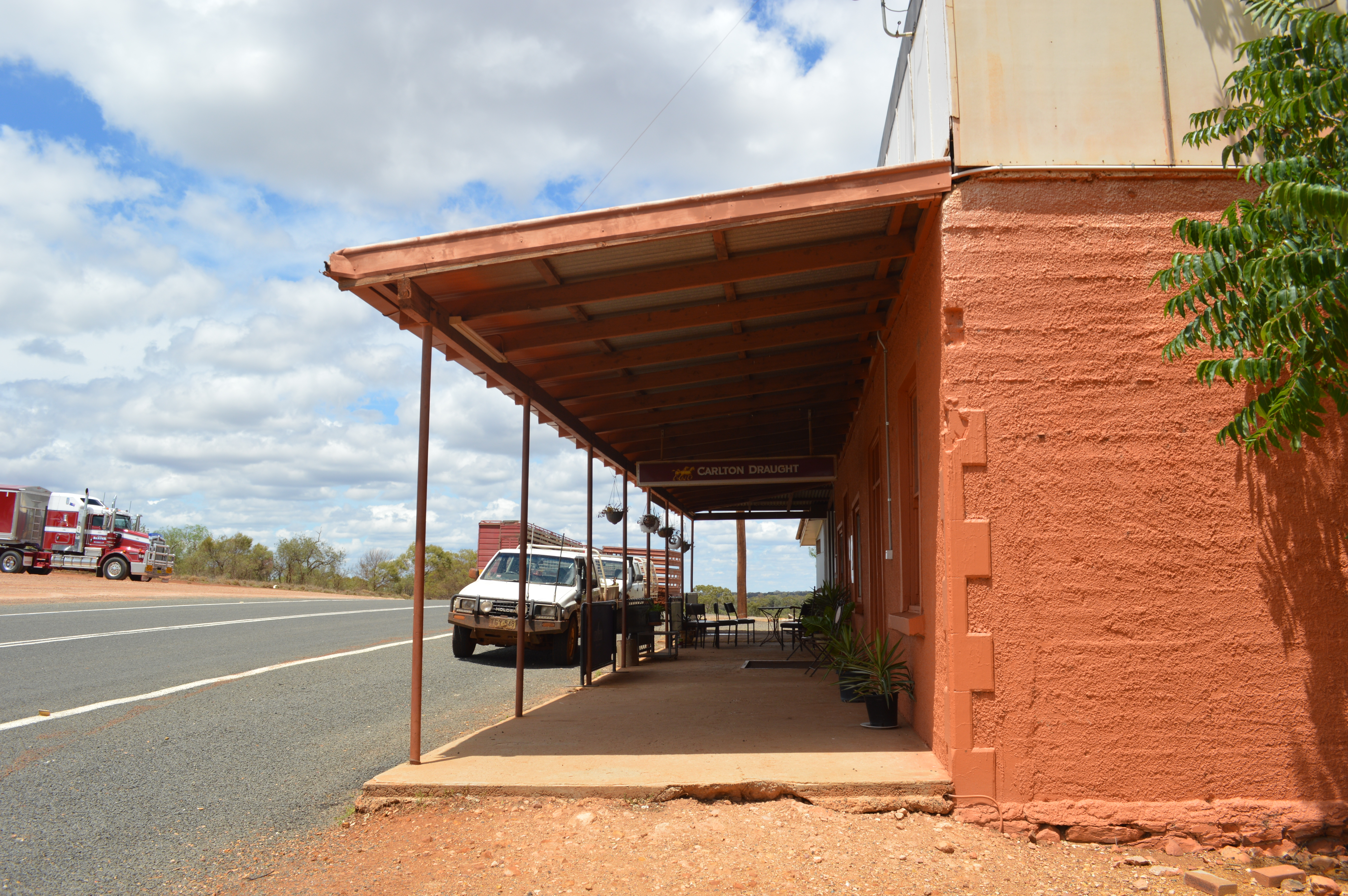
- The Royal Hotel at Mount Hope.

- Coordinates: 32°50′25″S 145°52′36.1″E
- Population: 16 (2021)
- Elevation: 223 m (732 ft)
- Location: 94.7 km (59 mi) NNE of Hillston
- LGA(s): Cobar Shire
- Federal division(s): Parkes

Mount Hope (elevation 223 m) is a settlement in western New South Wales, Australia. It is situated on the Kidman Way, 95 kilometres north of Hillston and 160 km south of Cobar. During the 1870s, a copper mine commenced operations at Mount Hope. In the mid-1880s, a proposed township in the area was officially surveyed and named Nombinnie, but the name has seldom been used. In the meantime, the town of Mount Hope sprang up, closer to the mine.

At the 2021 census, Mount Hope and surrounding area had a population of 16 people living in 10 private dwellings, with a median age of 30 years. The only remaining business at Mount Hope is the Royal Hotel (commonly referred to as the 'Mount Hope Pub') which offers food, beverages and accommodation (though fuel is no longer available).

== History ==
=== Indigenous origins ===
The Mount Hope region is within the traditional lands of the Wangaaypuwan dialect speakers (also known as Wangaibon) of the Ngiyampaa people.

=== 'Coan Downs' station ===
'Coan Downs' was a consolidated pastoral holding in Blaxland county (Western Division) made up of the previous Bundure, Coree, Gonn, Gooan, Killeen, Wagga, Yara and Yara Block B runs. Located about 40 miles north of the Lachlan River, the ‘Coan Downs’ pastoral run was leased by the Desailly brothers (Francis and George) in the late 1860s. By the early 1870s the station was under the management of the Melbourne Banking Company. In 1873 a shepherd on ‘Coan Downs’ station, Alexander Fisher, investigated "an unusual hill" on the pastoral run and "found copper mineralisation" and withered and yellowed vegetation on the site. The location of Fisher's discovery of copper ore was about ten miles south-east of the 'Coan Downs' station homestead and about three miles north-east of Mount Hope, a 300 feet high landmark "standing out in bold relief from the surrounding hills".

=== Mount Hope Copper Mining Company ===
A group of businessmen from Hay soon became involved in the discovery of copper ore at Mount Hope. In October 1873 Henry C. Viviain, a Hay auctioneer, arrived at Booligal with “some very rich specimens of copper ore brought from Mount Hope”. Viviain claimed that “the mountain is formed entirely… of this ore”. The copper ore was sent to Melbourne and assayed at a reported yield of 60 percent. The first shipment of ore from Mount Hope, weighing 10 tons, arrived at Hay in December 1873 on a dray “decorated with flags”. From Hay it was conveyed by water to Adelaide on the Cumberoona steamer. An advertisement in late December in the Riverine Grazier, lodged by Thomas Blewett and Henry B. Welsh of Hay, called for tenders "to carry by land and water, 1,000 tons of copper ore via Hay, from the Mount Hope Copper Mines, 150 miles from Hay, to the smelting works, Adelaide".

A second discovery of copper ore in the Mount Hope vicinity was made soon afterwards by McDowell and Mackenzie, in a porphyry formation just three miles or so south of the Mount Hope mine, which they named the Great Central Copper Mine. In February 1874 a third discovery was made in the district (by R. D. Jones), six miles north-east of the Mount Hope mine.

In September 1874 the Mount Hope Copper Mining Company (Limited) was registered by the company manager, Thomas Clay, with a nominal capital of sixty thousand pounds (made up of five pound shares fully subscribed). Shareholders included a selection of businessmen (mostly from Hay) and district landholders. Richard Hollow, with “thirty years’ experience in copper mining in Cornwall and South Australia”, was appointed manager of the Mount Hope Mine. A manager’s house, a store, blacksmith's shop and miners’ huts were constructed at the mine site and three water tanks were excavated. However, development of the Mount Hope Mine was hampered by a shortage of water and the cost of transporting the ore.

In February 1877 it was reported that at a special meeting at Hay of the Mount Hope Copper Mining Company "the chairman stated that all operations at the mine had been suspended until such times as the shareholders should agree upon some plan by which to work the mine". In the interim “the company's property would be in charge of a responsible caretaker”. In 1878 the company made a call on shareholders of sixpence in the pound. By November it was disclosed that “there were 2000 shares forfeited for non-payment of calls”. In February 1881 the principals of the Mount Hope Copper Mining Company began the process of setting up a new company. In January 1882 the old company was dissolved and its assets transferred to the New Mount Hope Copper Mining Company.

=== Mount Hope township ===
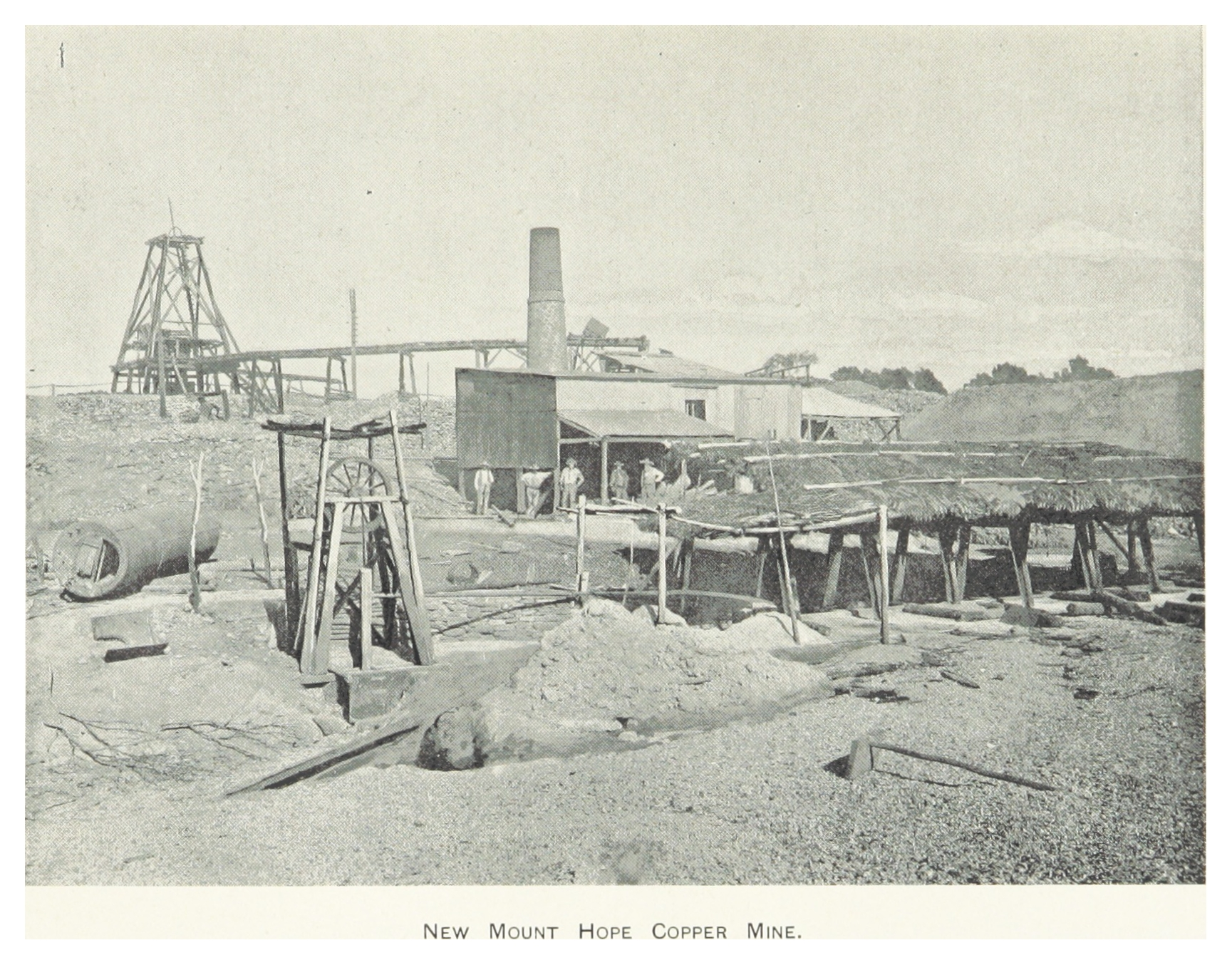
The New Mount Hope Copper Mine [from The Copper-mining Industry and the Distribution of Copper Ores in New South Wales by J. E. Carne (1899)].

The formation of the New Mount Hope Copper Mining Company involved an injection of capital from the smelting company, Messrs. W. J. Weston and Co. of Sydney (representing half the share value) and the transfer of the registered office from Hay to Sydney. The construction of smelting furnaces at Mount Hope were commenced under the management of Captain Mathew Bryant. By February 1881 one furnace was “almost completed and another in a forward state”. Miners were “busy getting out the ore” and, as reported by a resident, “the deep sound of a blast or shot as they call it, startles us eight or ten times a day”. The description of Mount Hope in February 1881 was optimistic about the prospects of the settlement. The writer noted that “Mount Hope has arisen again from the ashes of the first attempt to develop its grand mineral resources, and what was a desert of rocks a few months ago is now a busy little town that may soon rival Cobar”. It was estimated that the adult male population was about fifty or sixty. Women and children were also present; the writer remarked: “I never saw such a place for children; it is like an ant bed, but they all seem healthy and happy”.

In August 1881 new machinery installed at the New Mount Hope Mine was started up. The steam engine was “a horizontal engine of twenty horse power with Cornish boiler”, driving “Madden’s new patent crackers, with winding gear and rollers for crushing the ore”. Two furnaces were in operation, to which the crushed ore was conveyed by a tramway. Since the first furnace started in April there had been “140 tons of copper turned out and sent away”. The population of the township “exceeds 400 souls, but as soon as rain comes it will double that number”. There were two stores, “one just newly opened”, as well as “three hotels, two bakers’ shops, two blacksmiths’ shops, two butchers’ shops, also numerous other business palaces of minor importance, and private dwellings are dotted here and there, scattered as on all new mining townships”.

In November 1882 it was reported that “a Government tank of 25,000 yards is being excavated for the benefit of the public” at Mount Hope. A post office and a bank had opened in the township. Four stores were established “and another in course of erection”. The population “exceeds 500 souls”.

The Great Central Copper Mine south of Mount Hope township had re-commenced operations during 1882. A company had been formed in 1881 to work the mine and, beginning in April 1881, three shafts were sunk under the management of C. L. Cawse. By late 1882 furnaces, sheds and an engine-house were being constructed. Adjoining the Great Central mine was the less developed South Mount Hope mine, the property of “Brown and party”. Seven miles north-west of Mount Hope township was the undeveloped Mount Allen copper mine.

By 1883 the New Mount Hope mine was employing 200 men and boys and had produced 2,088 tons of ore to produce 431 tons of copper. A township of 800 people had grown up around the mine with four hotels, a billiard hall and boxing saloon, four stores, a post office and a bank. This was a prosperous period for the New Mount Hope company; for several years dividends of 2s. 6d. per share were paid to shareholders.

In November 1884 portions of Crown Lands were “declared to be set apart” as a site for “the village of Nombinnie”. The proposed townsite of Nombinnie was located south of the established Mount Hope township. Most references to the name Nombinnie are found in official government publications or newspapers quoting government sources. To residents the township remained known as Mount Hope. By May 1888 none of the surveyed allotments had been sold “and only the surveyor’s pegs and ditches remain to mark the site”. In November 1901 it was reported that there “about a score of new dwellings” in the surveyed township “and others are in process of erection”.

Copper prices declined during the mid-1880s and the “unprecedented depression in the copper market” adversely affected the balance sheets of the Mount Hope mining companies. In late 1885 and early 1886 both the Great Central and the New Mount Hope mines were closed down “in consequence of the low price of copper, and the expense of carting the ore to the port”. Both mines remained closed for two years.

In early 1888 both the companies were "induced by a favourable turn in the market" to restart the mines at Mount Hope. The township had deteriorated to a marked degree after two years of the mines being closed. In May 1888 Mount Hope was described as “a long straggling” township, which “does not look its best at the present time”. Near the mine were “numbers of ruins where mud or bark huts once stood” and the street running over the spur of the hill was “lined by a number of weatherboard stores and shops, many of which have been closed for the past two years”. The publican of the Royal Hotel, William Clark, had "stayed on all through the depression". Opposite to the Royal "is another hotel, empty, forsaken and forlorn". However, "within the past two or three weeks some of the deserted shops have been re-opened" and the population which had departed when the two mines closed was "gradually returning". In August 1888 a correspondent from Mount Hope wrote that "the mines are going on very slowly" because of the cost of wood for the smelting furnaces. The price of dry wood was seven shillings a ton "and carters have to go six, seven, and eight miles for it”. The situation was exacerbated by the practice of “scrubbing” (removing undergrowth) by squatters, for which task Chinese workers were engaged. The Mount Hope Progress Society had asked that “no more permits be granted for ringbarking within a certain distance of the boundaries of Mount Hope common, as the same is injurious to the mining industry”. The writer concluded that “unless something be done to protect timber, the copper mines, &c., in this district will be abandoned for good”.

In August 1899 “concentrating machinery” was installed at the New Mount Hope mine which was able to utilise low grade ore by “dressing it up to a high smelting value”. This was expected to be of “immense benefit to the trade of the district, as of late years owing to insufficient output of copper” employees had not received “the full value of their earnings”. At the Great Central mine it was reported that “affairs look gloomy”, where work was being carried out "in a perfunctory sort of manner, but… there is no money about”.

In 1913 the New Mount Hope copper mine was acquired by Mount Hope Ltd. In March 1918 it was reported that the mine was “now worked as a purely concentrating and leaching proposition” and “gives employment to 150 men”. By that stage the Central Mount Hope mine had ceased operations.

=== Railway branch line ===
The Matakana to Mount Hope single-tracked branch line was opened in February 1919. The copper mine for which this branch was constructed to service ceased full-time operations four months before the line was opened.

In early July 1924 the train service between Matakana and Mount Hope was discontinued “because of the paucity of business”; there had been “so little hope of a mining revival in the district that the whole of the mining machinery at Mount Hope was dismantled and removed”.

=== Population decline ===
In March 1927 Mount Hope was described as a “decayed mining town” that “has been living on hopes and memories for years”. The price of copper had fallen so low “that the mines closed up and much of the two plants has been sold”.

In December 1957 five separate bush fires “were raging out of control” between Condobolin and Hillston. The main Western railway line was cut and tracks destroyed. Fires around Euabalong and Mount Hope were “burning on a 100-mile front”. A fire “threatened to engulf” the village of Matakana (17 km south of Mount Hope) and “20 women and children were driven through an arch of flames to escape the fire” and provided with accommodation at Mount Hope. Fire fighters “managed to divert the flames” around Matakana village.

== The Royal Hotel ==
The Royal Hotel is a survivor from the heyday of Mount Hope. The Royal Hotel was one of four hotels granted licenses during 1881 as the New Mount Hope Copper Mining Company built infrastructure, installed machinery and commenced mining and smelting operations at Mount Hope. The first of the licensed premises was the Mount Hope Hotel in March 1881, followed by William Clark’s Royal Hotel (July), Thomas Saunders’ Albion Hotel (August) and John Lees’ Commercial Hotel (November 1881). In September 1882 a license was granted to James Lyell for the Great Central Hotel at South Mount Hope. William and Sarah Clark and family had been living in the Mount Hope district since about 1876. Clark was also an owner of a store at Mount Hope township.

During the period 1898 to 1905 Louis Mozzini, previously from Hillston, became the licensee of the Royal Hotel. William Clark resumed as licensee of the hotel from July 1905.

William Clark died in February 1910 at Waverley in Sydney. His widow Sarah Clark took over the license of the Royal Hotel at Mount Hope after his death. In July 1912 the license was transferred from Sarah Clark to her son, William Frederick Clark. The correspondent made the comment: “We wish the new proprietor luck in his undertaking and hope that business in Mount Hope will soon liven up so as to compensate all business people for their endurance”. In about 1917 the Clark family sold the Royal Hotel to B. A. Davis.

In 1930 the Royal Hotel was owned by John Swasbrick (Snr.) and the licensee was Mrs. W. Davis. In December 1930 a fire destroyed the Royal Hotel. At the subsequent inquiry by the Coroner it was pointed out that “although the building was constructed chiefly of concrete and iron with an absolute minimum of wood, the building was on fire throughout its length and breadth in an incredibly short space of time, the fire spreading rapidly even against the wind”. The inquiry revealed that “the owner was not in embarrassed circumstances, although the licensee was” and returned an open verdict regarding the origin of the fire.

In June 1933 John Swasbrick died at his residence, the Royal Hotel, aged 79 years. At the time of his death Swasbrick was the owner and licensee of the hotel.

The Royal claims to have the only concrete bar in New South Wales.

== Environment ==
Mount Hope is surrounded by three extensive nature reserves: Yathong, Nombinnie and Round Hill. The reserves comprise a large area of plain and ridge country on the boundaries between three major biophysical regions: the Cobar Peneplain, the Darling Depression and the Southern Riverine Plain. The area protects the largest remaining contiguous stand of mallee in NSW and supports a rich diversity of flora and fauna, including many rare and endangered species.

Round Hill Nature Reserve (south-east of Mount Hope), Nombinnie Nature Reserve (to the south) and Yathong Nature Reserve (to the north-west) are included in the 2,500 square kilometres Central NSW Mallee Important Bird Area because of its significance for bird conservation, especially of the malleefowl and red-lored whistler.

== See also ==
- Mount Allen, New South Wales
