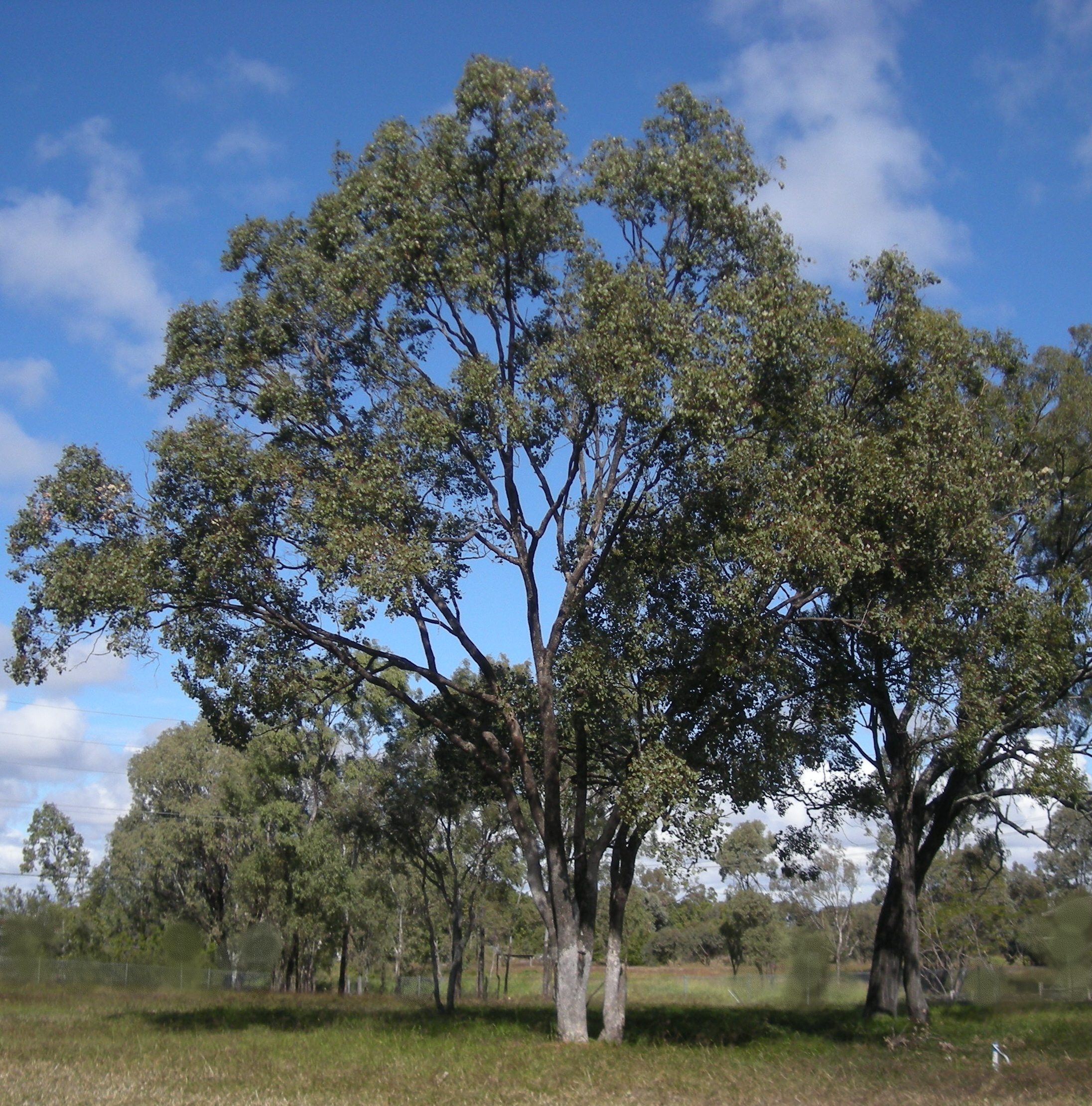
- Eucalyptus populnea in central coastal Queensland

Scientific classification
- Kingdom: Plantae
- Clade: Embryophytes
- Clade: Tracheophytes
- Clade: Spermatophytes
- Clade: Angiosperms
- Clade: Eudicots
- Clade: Rosids
- Order: Myrtales
- Family: Myrtaceae
- Genus: Eucalyptus
- Species: E. populnea

Binomial name
- Eucalyptus populnea F. Muell.
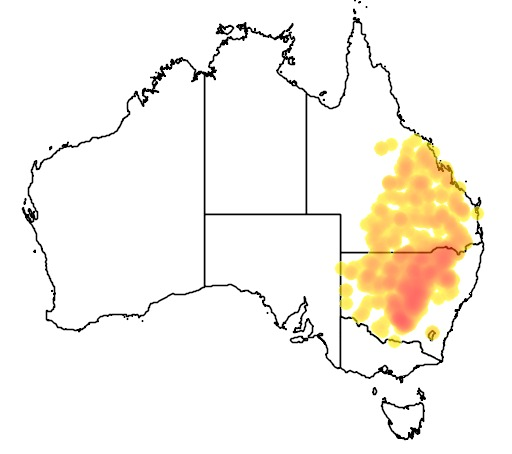
- Distribution of Eucalyptus populnea

Synonyms
- Eucalyptus populifolia Hook. nom. illeg.; Eucalyptus populifolia Hook. var. populifolia; Eucalyptus populnea subsp. bimbil L.A.S.Johnson & K.D.Hill; Eucalyptus populnea F.Muell.subsp. populnea; Eucalyptus populnea F.Muell.var. populnea

= Eucalyptus populnea =

Poplar box

Species of eucalyptus

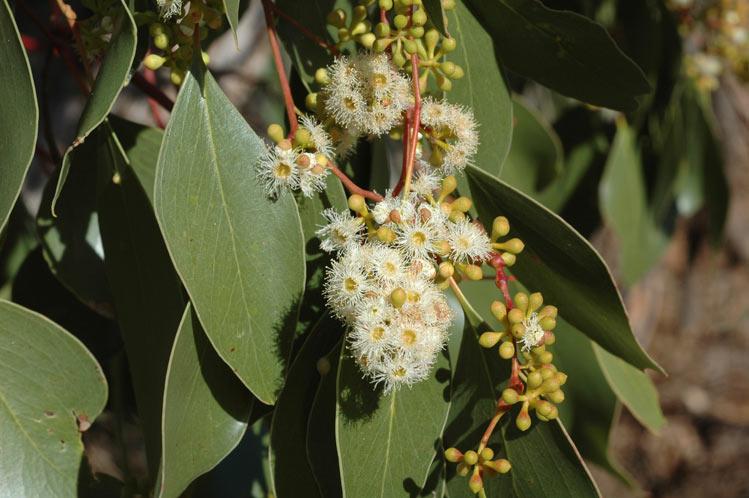
Flower buds and flowers

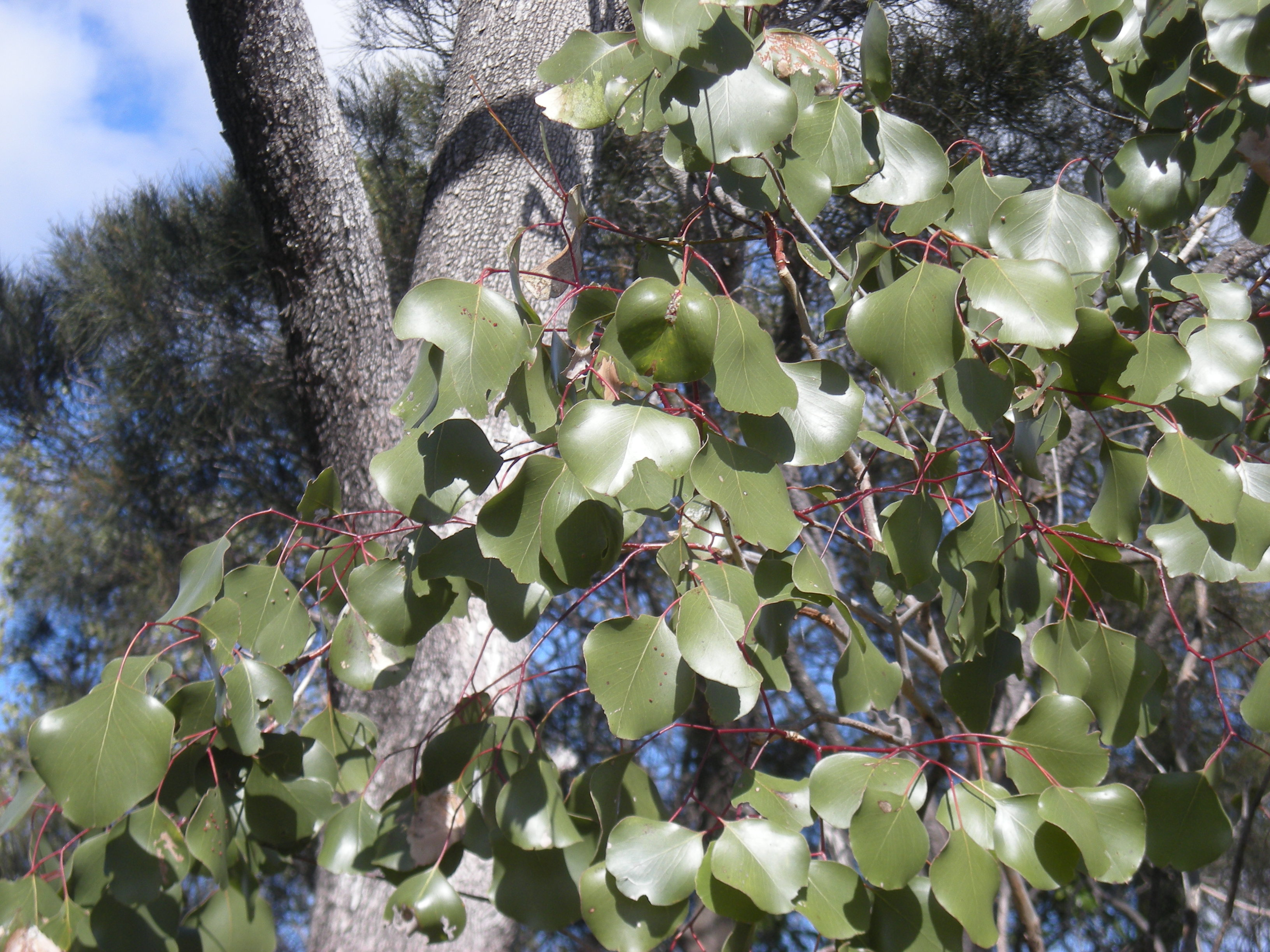
Leaves

Eucalyptus populnea, commonly known as poplar box, bimble box or bimbil box, is a species of small to medium-sized tree that is endemic to eastern Australia. It has rough, fibrous or flaky bark on the trunk and branches, egg-shaped, elliptical or more or less round leaves, flower buds arranged in groups of seven to fifteen or more, white flowers and conical, hemispherical or cup-shaped fruit.

== Description ==
Eucalyptus populnea is a tree that typically grows to a height of 20 m (66 ft) and forms a lignotuber. It has rough, fibrous or flaky, greyish bark on the trunk and larger branches, smooth grey bark that is shed in short ribbons from the thinner branches. Young plants and coppice regrowth have egg-shaped to almost round, dull greyish green leaves that are 60–115 mm (2.4–4.5 in) long and 35–95 mm (1.4–3.7 in) wide. The crown has leaves that are the same shade of glossy green on both sides, egg-shaped, elliptical or more or less round leaves that are 40–110 mm (1.6–4.3 in) long and 18–50 mm (0.71–1.97 in) wide tapering to a petiole 10–32 mm (0.39–1.26 in) long. The flower buds are mostly arranged on the ends of branchlets in groups of seven to fifteen or more, on a branched peduncle 4–11 mm (0.16–0.43 in) long, the individual buds on pedicels 1–4 mm (0.039–0.157 in) long. Mature buds are oblong to spherical, 3–5 mm (0.12–0.20 in) long and 2–3 mm (0.079–0.118 in) wide with a conical to rounded operculum. Flowering occurs from August to December and the flowers are white. The fruit is a woody, conical, hemispherical or cup-shaped capsule 2–4 mm (0.079–0.157 in) long and wide with the valves near rim level.

== Taxonomy ==
Eucalyptus populnea was first formally described in 1858 by botanist Ferdinand von Mueller in Journal of the Proceedings of the Linnean Society, Botany. The specific epithet populnea is a Latin adjective referring to the poplar-like foliage.

The common names bimble box and bimbil box are from the Wiradjuri name for the species. Other common names recorded include round-leaf box, red box, white box, egolla, nankeen gum, round-leaved box and shiny-leaf box.

In 1990, Lawrie Johnson and Ken Hill described two subspecies, populnea and bimbil but the names have not been accepted by the Australian Plant Census.

Hybrids with E. populnea have been recorded but only one, Eucalyptus populnea F.Muell. × Eucalyptus thozetiana (F.Muell. ex Maiden) R.T.Baker is accepted at the Australian Plant Census.

== Distribution and habitat ==
Poplar box is widespread in New South Wales where it is found on the western plains north from Narrandera and Pooncarie, extending into Queensland as far as Rockhampton. It is most abundant in the northern and central sections on the western plains, becoming gradually less common the New South Wales far west, where it is restricted to areas that are more reliably watered and sandier.

This eucalypt is most commonly found on red soils with a sandy loam to clay loam texture, growing in association with gum coolibah (E. intertexta), grey box (E. microcarpa) and white cypress pine (Callitris glaucophylla). It can be found less commonly on sandplains composed of deep loamy sands, where it will be found growing with ironwood (Acacia excelsa) and mulga (Acacia aneura). In the far west of New South Wales it grows in small terminal drainage depressions with sandy soils overlying clay at depth.

== Ecology ==
It is a favoured food tree for koalas in the range where it occurs.

== Uses ==
The flowers of E. populnea produce honey of a good quality, but of limited supply, and which is very dense and pale amber in colour. The timber has been found to be durable and hard and is suitable for fence posts and construction work. However it is not any easy to work timber and is susceptible to white ant attack. It is a suitable species for a windbreak, as it can be propagated easily and is not difficult to establish. It is an excellent fuel, producing a great deal of heat and burns cleanly.

== Conservation ==
Although it is widespread, the conservation status of E. populnea and allied plant communities is poor. Along the eastern edge of the species' distribution, only a small remnant of some communities occur on the better soil types. There are also a number of minor communities which only occur in limited areas, with very few of these represented in conservation areas such as national parks or nature reserves.

Protected areas in which significant populations can be found include the Yathong Nature Reserve in New South Wales.

== See also ==
- List of Eucalyptus species
