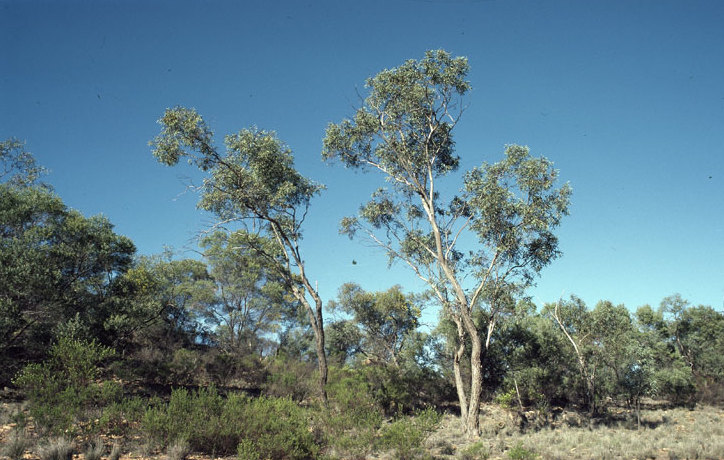
- Eucalyptus morrisii near Girilambone

Scientific classification
- Kingdom: Plantae
- Clade: Tracheophytes
- Clade: Angiosperms
- Clade: Eudicots
- Clade: Rosids
- Order: Myrtales
- Family: Myrtaceae
- Genus: Eucalyptus
- Species: E. morrisii

Binomial name
- Eucalyptus morrisii R.T.Baker

= Eucalyptus morrisii =

Grey mallee

Species of eucalyptus

Eucalyptus morrisii, commonly known as grey mallee, is a species of mallee or straggly tree that is endemic to western New South Wales. It has rough, fibrous or flaky bark on some or all of the trunk, smooth greyish bark above, lance-shaped adult leaves, flower buds usually in groups of three, white flowers and conical or hemispherical fruit.

== Description ==
Eucalyptus morrisii is a mallee, sometimes a straggly tree, that typically grows to a height of 4–10 m (13–33 ft) and forms a lignotuber. It has rough, fibrous or flaky, sometimes compacted, dark grey bark on part or all of the trunk, smooth greyish bark above. Young plants and coppice regrowth have linear to narrow lance-shaped leaves that are dull green, 60–150 mm (2.4–5.9 in) long and 5–20 mm (0.20–0.79 in) wide on a short petiole. Adult leaves are lance-shaped, the same shade of dull, greyish green on both sides, 55–145 mm (2.2–5.7 in) long and 8–21 mm (0.31–0.83 in) wide on a petiole 7–20 mm (0.28–0.79 in) long. The flower buds are arranged in leaf axils, usually in groups of three, on a peduncle 5–13 mm (0.20–0.51 in) long, the individual buds on pedicels 2–3 mm (0.079–0.118 in) long. Mature buds are oval, yellow or cream-coloured, 8–9 mm (0.31–0.35 in) long and about 5 mm (0.20 in) wide with a conical operculum. Flowering occurs in December and the flowers are white. The fruit is a woody conical or hemispherical capsule 7–9 mm (0.28–0.35 in) long and 6–9 mm (0.24–0.35 in) wide with the valves protruding above the rim.

== Taxonomy and naming ==
Eucalyptus morrisii was first described in 1900 by Richard Thomas Baker in Proceedings of the Linnean Society of New South Wales from specimens collected "near Girilambone, on stony or rocky hills". It was first collected by William Baeuerlen, (previously known as Wilhelm Bäuerlen). The specific epithet honours "R. N. Morris, LL.D., the present Superintendent of Technical Education in New South Wales, in acknowledgment of his co-operation in our work on the economies of the genus Eucalyptus".

== Distribution and habitat ==
Grey mallee is usually found in low mallee communities, growing on shallow soil on stony hills. It occurs in the area between Bourke, Nyngan and Cobar in central-western New South Wales.
