= Matakana, New South Wales =

Matakana
- Town
- Coordinates: 32°59′27″S 145°54′22″E
- Country: Australia
- State: New South Wales
- LGA: Cobar Shire
- Location: 17 km (11 mi) S of Mount Hope; 78 km (48 mi) NNE of Hillston

Government
  - Federal division: Parkes
- Elevation: 150 m (490 ft)

Matakana is a rural locality in western New South Wales, Australia. It is situated just off the Kidman Way, 78 kilometres north of Hillston and 177 kilometres south of Cobar. The small settlement of Mount Hope is located 17 kilometres to the north on the Kidman Way.

Matakana is on the route of the Broken Hill railway line, between the Euabalong West and Ivanhoe stations. Matakana was once a siding on the railway line. A short branch line connecting Matakana to Mount Hope was opened in February 1919 and closed after five years. A small rural community settled in the vicinity of the Matakana siding during its operation.

== History ==
In August 1901 there was a report of a “small gold rush” near Matakana, nine miles south of Mount Hope, after the discovery of a reef where “gold can be seen in the stone”. The discovery by prospectors Eldridge and Grogan caused a flurry of excitement at Mount Hope where “the Warden's clerk has been kept busy issuing miner's rights”.

The Matakana to Mount Hope single-track branch railway line was opened in February 1919.

In early July 1924 the train service between Matakana and Mount Hope was discontinued “because of the paucity of business”; there had been “so little hope of a mining revival in the district that the whole of the mining machinery at Mount Hope was dismantled and removed”.

In July 1929 “a site near the railway line at Matakana” was selected as the location of “an experimental farm within the area to serve prospective settlers”. The selection of the site was a part of the “preliminary investigations” by E. S. Clayton (Chief Experimentalist of the Department of Agriculture) “for the projected settlement of a large area of the south-western mallee lands in N.S.W.” . The area was expected to “be devoted chiefly to wheatgrowing, with a probable subsequent extension to sheep”. The water supply, "in addition to bores”, was proposed to be drawn from Wyangala dam. In August 1930 Matakana was described as “the proposed Mallee wheatgrowing settlement”.

In October 1941 “new trucking yards” were completed at Matakana and it was expected that “persons trucking stock there will find a great improvement”.

In July 1952 a description was published of an overnight camp at Matakana, described as “that unexpected railway line break in the midst of miles and miles of thick high mallee”. Trains passed along the track during the night: “on a westward bound goods train we counted 54 trucks in the bright moonlight”.

In December 1957 five separate bush fires “were raging out of control” between Condobolin and Hillston. The main Western railway line was cut and tracks destroyed. Fires around Euabalong and Mount Hope were “burning on a 100-mile front”. A fire “threatened to engulf” the “village of Matakana” and “20 women and children were driven through an arch of flames to escape the fire” and provided with accommodation at nearby Mount Hope. Fire fighters “managed to divert the flames” around Matakana.

== Environment ==
Matakana is surrounded by two extensive nature reserves, Nombinnie to the south-west and Round Hill to the east. The reserves comprise a large area of plain and ridge country, and together with the Yathong Nature Reserve (north-west of Mount Hope), the area protects the largest remaining contiguous stand of mallee in NSW and supports a rich diversity of flora and fauna, including many rare and endangered species.
