= Yathong Nature Reserve =

Protected area in New South Wales, Australia

- IUCN category Ia (strict nature reserve)
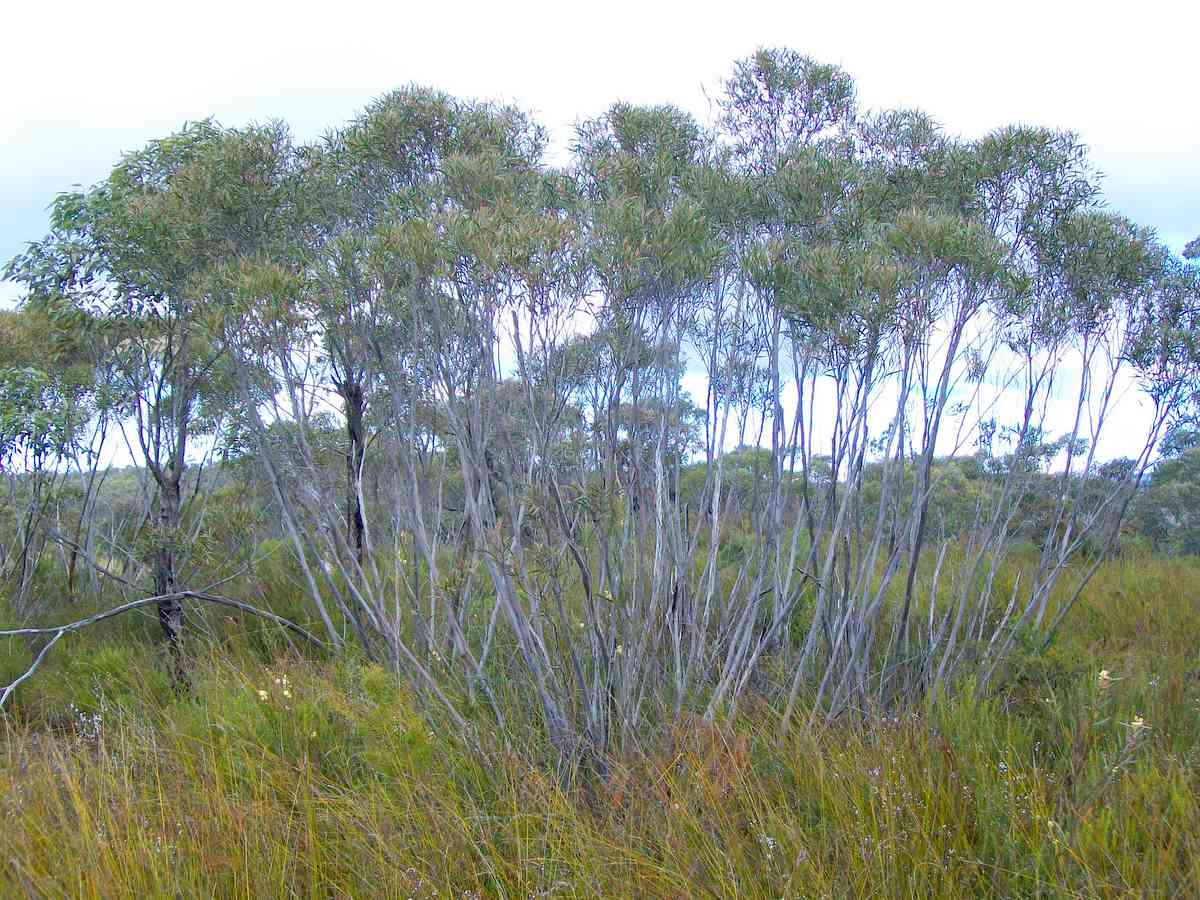
- Example of mallee vegetation

- Location within New South Wales
- Location: New South Wales
- Nearest city: Cobar
- Coordinates: 32°33′38.5″S 145°32′09.2″E
- Area: 1,072.4 km^{2} (414.1 sq mi)
- Established: April 1971 (NR); 1977 (MAB)
- Governing body: NSW National Parks & Wildlife Service
- Website: Official website

The Yathong Nature Reserve is a protected nature reserve that is also a nationally and internationally recognized biosphere situated in the central-western region of New South Wales, in eastern Australia. The 107,240-hectare (265,000-acre) reserve was listed by UNESCO in 1977 as a Biosphere Reserve under the Man and the Biosphere Programme (MAB). The reserve is significant for its biodiversity in both native plant and animal species. Cultural heritage and historical grazing activities add to the significance of this site as a conservation area.

The reserve is the most extensive in New South Wales and shares a border with the Nombinnie Nature Reserve in the south-eastern corner, and is part of the Central NSW Mallee Important Bird Area.

The reserve is situated 130 kilometres (81 mi) south of the central-west town of Cobar and 656 kilometres (408 mi) west from Sydney.

== Geography and climate ==
The topography and landscape of the Yathong Nature Reserve is typical of central New South Wales in its predominance of semi-arid characteristics. The reserve is positioned within two Interim Biogeographic Regionalisation of Australia (IBRA) bioregions of the Cobar Peneplain and the Murray Darling Depression. The geography exhibits a mix of flat, undulating plains, ridges and ranges. The dominating ridge system is the Merrimerriwa Range, which is a prominent feature in the landscape that extends south throughout the south-east corner of the reserve. These regions are dominated by soil types that range from thin sandy/stony on the ridges to thicker colluvial, red and earthy types that exhibit texture contrast profiles.

The reserve is subject to the dominating semi-arid climate of the region. Hot and dry climatic patterns give rise to hot summers and mild winters with steady rainfall averages throughout the year.

== Ecological character ==
Regional biospheres share uneven borders both within and in close proximity to the reserve, which greatly influences the reserve's ecological character and structure. These geographic and landscape properties provide a variety of habitats and ecosystems in which plant and animal species thrive. Sub-tropical, arid and semi-arid landscapes and subtle climatic components are an influencing factor for the rich plant communities. This is also the case for the animal population, which also exhibits a richness and diversity. The major vegetation groups include semi-arid woodlands, arid shrub-lands and grassy woodlands. Animal communities are composed of mixed mammals, birds and reptiles; some of which are listed as endangered or rare both regionally and nationally.

=== Flora ===
There are a range of plant species that make up the significant mixed floral communities across the reserve. Current records show a total of 460 species within the reserve of which 12 have protection status in New South Wales. Two species, curly-bark wattle (Acacia curranii) and wingless fissure-weed (Osteocarpum pentapterum), have vulnerable and extinct listing respectively. The vegetation communities can be split based on dominating geographic assemblages within the reserve. Roughly 50% of the vegetation is of mallee vegetation types, which include green mallee (Eucalyptus viridis), grey mallee (Eucalyptus morrisii), white mallee (Eucalyptus dumosa), red mallee (Eucalyptus socialis), yorrell white mallee (Eucalyptus gracilis) and dwyers mallee (Eucalyptus dwyeri). The remaining vegetation communities of the reserve are woodland types that have two classes: grassy and semi-arid woodland. They include white cypress pine (Callitris glaucophylla), bimble box (Eucalyptus populnea), black box (Eucalyptus largiflorens), and belah (Casuarina cristata). Both community structure and diversity of the vegetation throughout the reserve has undergone measurable alteration as a result of land clearance and grazing activities. Uncertainty surrounds the pre-European character of distribution and diversity of vegetation and therefore the full extent to which impacts have altered the natural community assemblage is unclear.

Mallee communities have a distinctive vegetation assemblage which is predominately made up of eucalypt species. Extensive grazing and agricultural activities following European settlement has reduced the distribution of these distinctive communities. The extent of intact mallee within the reserve highlights the importance for conservation activities for both the distinctive plant communities and the inhabiting fauna.

=== Fauna ===
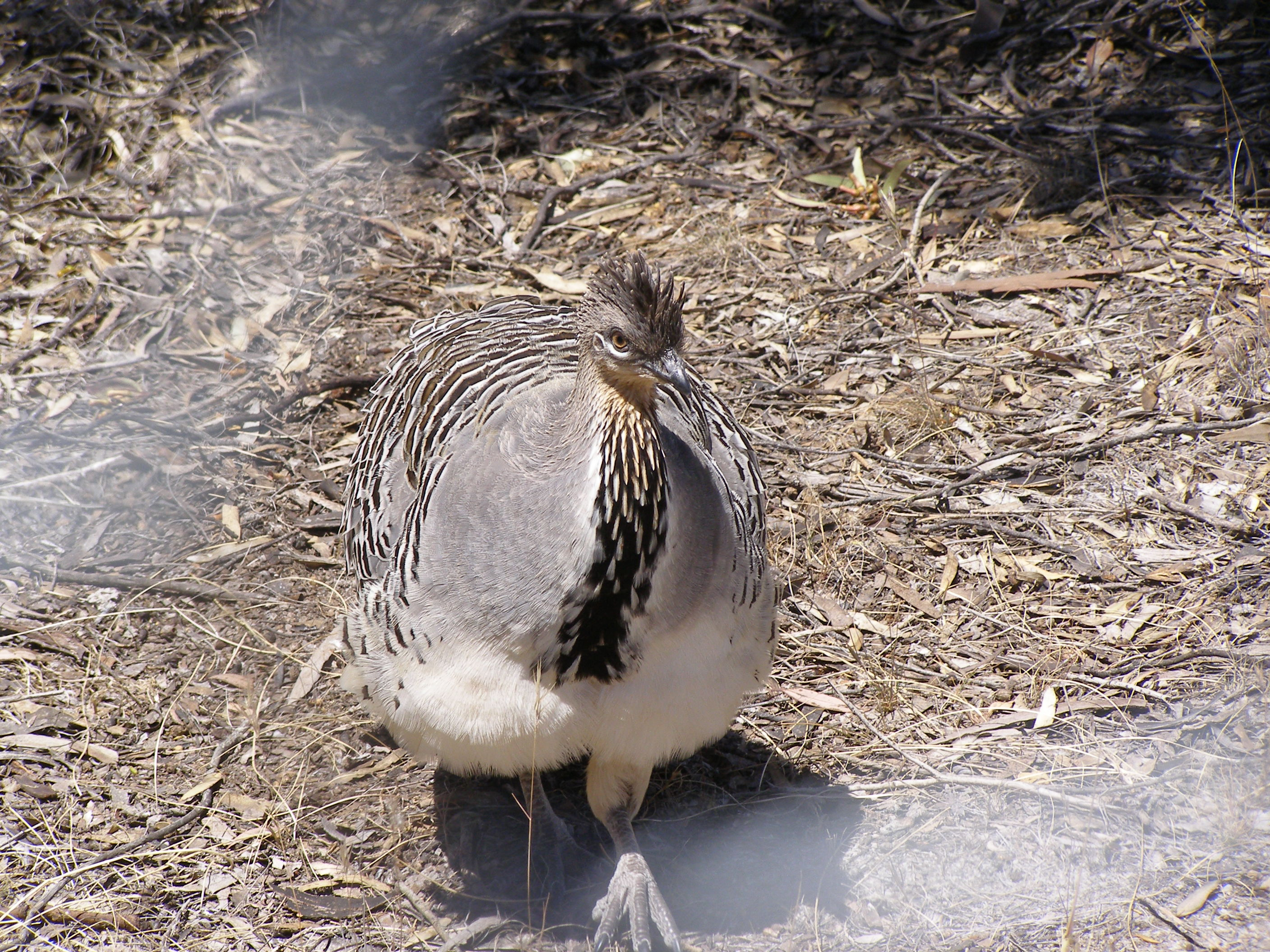
Malleefowl

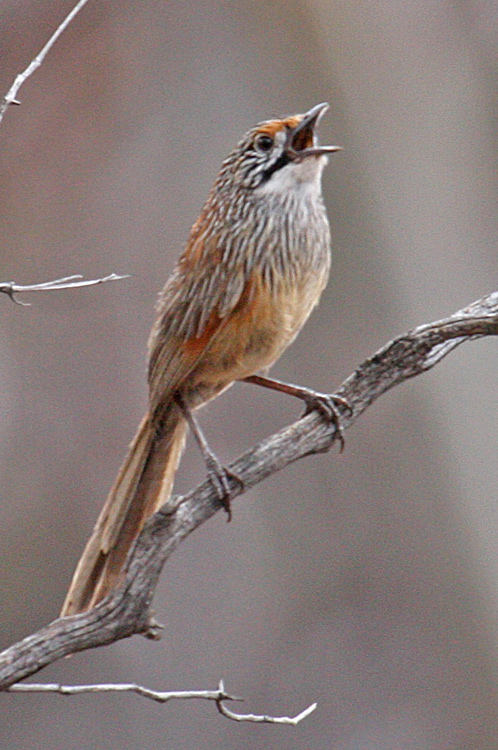
Striated grass wren

The reserve hosts a diverse range of animal species with a recorded total of 253 all of which have a protected status in New South Wales. Examples of mammal species include the short-beaked echidna (Tachyglossus aculeatus), brush-tailed rock-wallaby (Petrogale penicillata), yellow-bellied sheathtail-bat (Saccolaimus flaviventris). Three nationally important kangaroo species are all present within the reserve; eastern grey (Macropus giganteus), western grey (Macropus fuliginosus) and red kangaroo (Macropus rufus). Reptile species are also represented well within the reserve and include species such as; marble-faced delma (Delma australis), western blue-tongued lizard (Tiliqua occipitalis) and mallee military dragon (Ctenophorus fordi). Reptiles within the region have a preference for mallee habitat much like that of the malleefowl.

The area is rich in bird species with 130 being confirmed and a further concentration of 12 species within mallee habitat. Current records raise the total number of bird species present in the area up to 162. All recorded bird species are listed as protected in NSW; of these 11 are protected and 1 endangered and 4 recognised nationally. Notable species include malleefowl (Leipoa ocellata), red-lored whistler (Pachycephala rufogularis), grey falcon (Falco hypoleucos), pink cockatoo (Lophochroa leadbeateri) and striated grass wren (Amytornis striatus).

The malleefowl has gained considerable attention and conservation status within and outside the reserve. This is a result of the combination of encroachment of human activities and the specificity of the habitat requirements of the malleefowl. Management strategies at the time of NPWS reserve plan included breeding programs alongside activities to reduce threatening processes and predatory species. A national recovery plan targeting a range of endangered species, not specific to the reserve, includes actions to protect and promote the malleefowl population. The actions undertaken in NSW will comprise a variety of conservation and management activities. Introduced animal species, data collection and monitoring are the main approaches taken in NSW in the effort to preserve the malleefowl.

Many introduces species occur within the area and cause some alterations to the native species that inhabit the reserve. The major introduced species are the European red fox (Vulpes vulpes), feral cats (Felis catus), feral dogs (Canis lupus familiaris), feral pigs (Sus scrofa), goat (Capra hircus) and rabbit (Oryctolagos cuniculus).

== Environmental hazards and threats ==
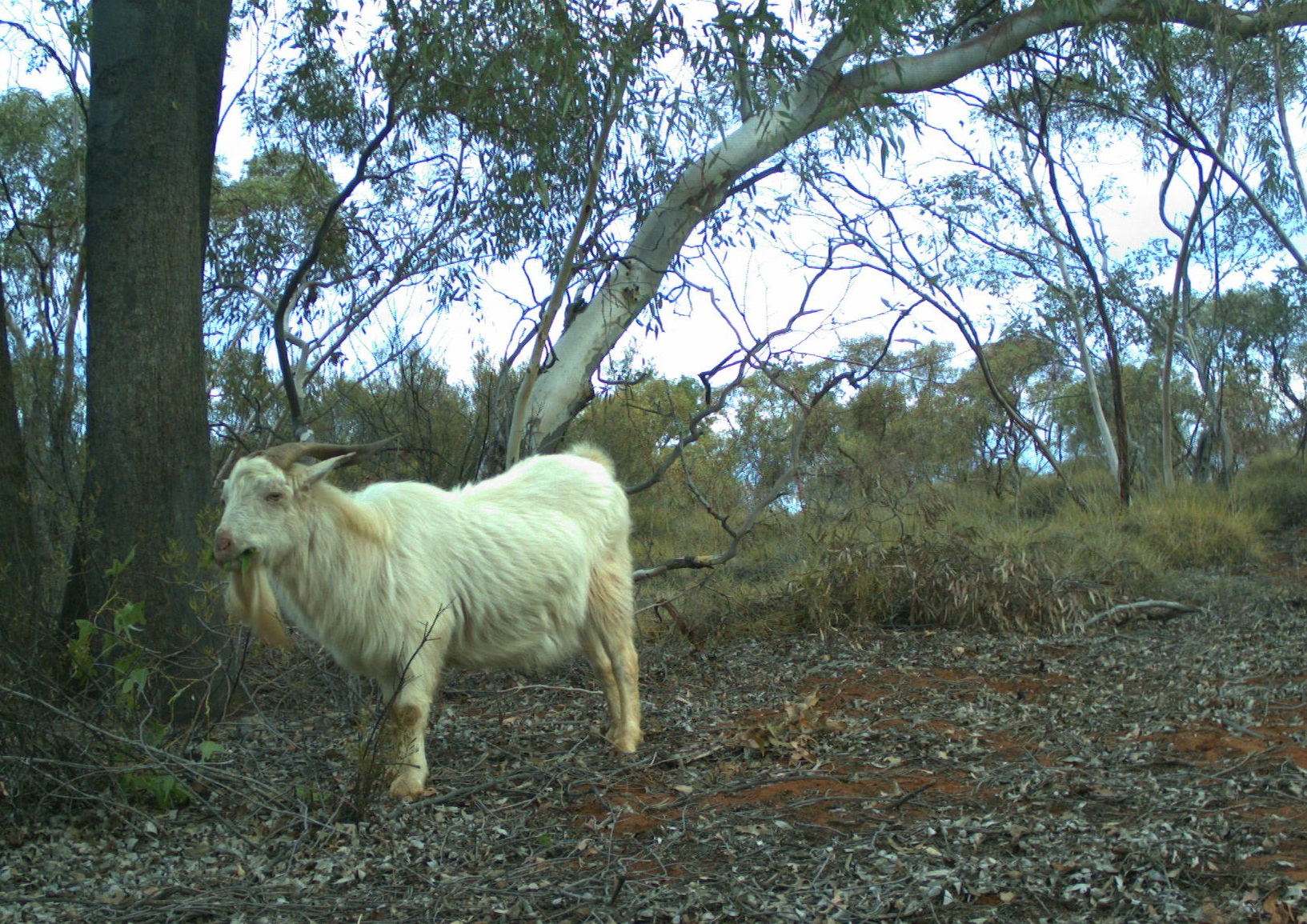
Feral goat browsing in Yathong Nature Reserve

The occurrence of bushfire is the primary environmental hazard that poses a direct threat to the biodiversity of the reserve. The threat of fire has been listed as a Key Threatening Process (KTP) by the NSW Government as it would have a drastic effect on the "loss of vegetation structure and composition". The fire management plan is one that considers biodiversity and cultural heritage in the approach to managing fires. The size and age of the reserve allows for a greater capacity for drought and fire resistance, which is in part due to the age classes of existing vegetation.

The second concern regarding threats comes from predation and encroachment of introduced species. Predation threats for the native species are a result of the feeding habits of the introduce feral animals. Both feral dogs and cats, for instance, pose threats to animal species within the reserve. Feral cat and fox predation on bird species is of particular concern for ground dwelling and nesting birds. Examples of the bird species that are vulnerable include; red-lored whistler (Pachycephala rufogularis), malleefowl (Leipoa ocellata) and striated grass wren (Amytornis striatus). Goats and rabbit species pose a risk to both the plant and animal communities through overgrazing and species competition. This is a raised concern where native animals may rely on a specific habitat such as the malleefowl. Competition, overgrazing and habitat destruction also comes from the three kangaroo species present within the reserve.

Introduced and invasive plant species also pose threats to the structure and range of plant communities. Species such as lantana (Lantana camara L. sens. Lat), bitou bush (Chrysanthemoides monilifera) and perennial grasses are a source of competition for native plant species. Subsequent effects on the habit and the dependent native animal species raises concern for the spread of invasive species.

== Reserve management ==
Yathong Nature Reserve is managed by the NSW National Parks & Wildlife Service (NPWS), an agency of the Government of New South Wales. The management goals of the reserve plan are the protection of floral and faunal communities with wider consideration of natural and cultural heritage and public uses. The key areas for management will focus on native and introduced flora and fauna alongside considerations of fire management. The second area of concern regards the recognition of cultural and historic properties of the park. The Ngiyam and Wiradjuripaa people, traditional land owners, will be involved with works and activities that concern cultural values, heritage and important sites. The development of information and knowledge of the reserve will draw from the knowledge that the traditional land owners possess.

The importance of the reserve has drawn interest from groups concerned with flora and fauna communities of the area. The Foundation for National Parks and Wildlife (FNPW) has been involved in the creation of the reserve and subsequent conservation activities, particularly of the malleefowl. The reserve is also listed in the Important Bird Area database, which contributes to monitoring the population's numbers and therefore aiding future protection and conservation efforts.

Management activities regarding threats mainly focus on controlling the effect of encroachment and predation by introduced species. Actions undertaken by the NPWS include targeted control plans for endangered and vulnerable native species. Baiting programs exist and target pest species such as foxes and feral dogs and cats.

== See also ==
- Protected areas of New South Wales
- List of biosphere reserves in Australia
