= Nombinnie Nature Reserve =

Protected area in New South Wales, Australia

- IUCN category Ia (strict nature reserve)
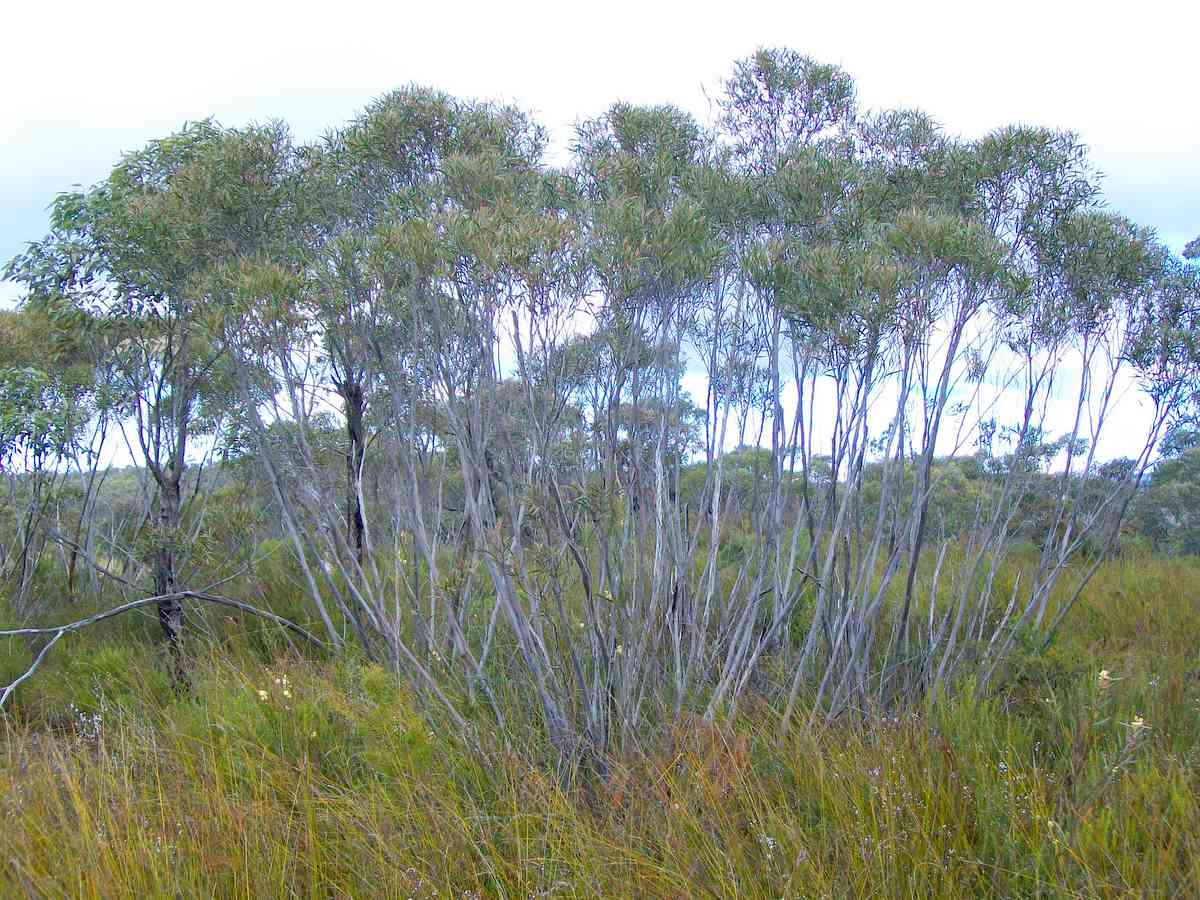
- Example of mallee vegetation (Eucalyptus stricta)

- Location within New South Wales
- Location: New South Wales
- Nearest city: Hillston
- Coordinates: 33°06′S 145°45′E
- Area: 700 km^{2} (270 sq mi)
- Established: December 1988 (NR); 1977 (MAB)
- Governing body: NSW National Parks & Wildlife Service
- Website: Official website

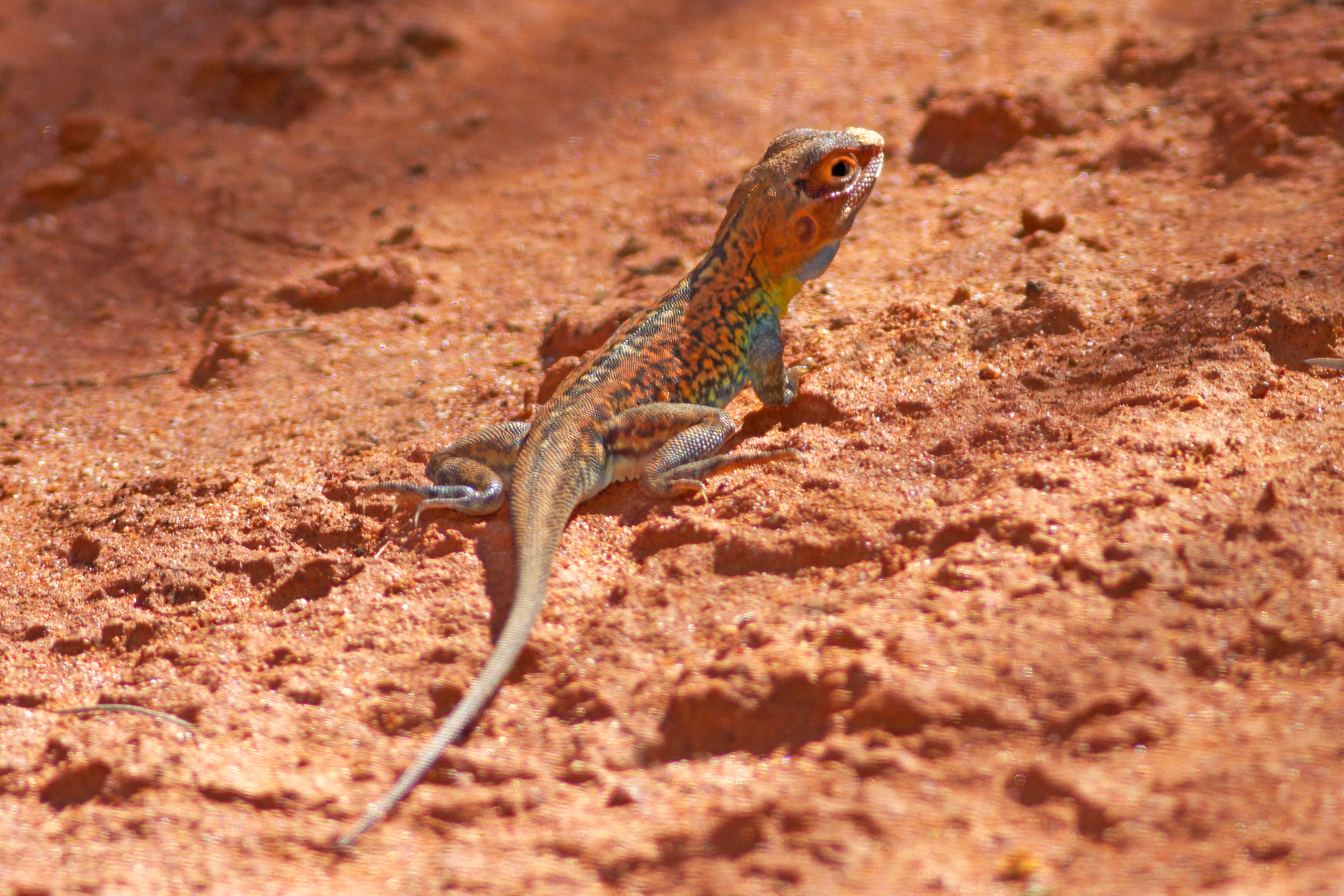
Painted dragon at Nombinnie

The Nombinnie Nature Reserve is a protected nature reserve in central New South Wales.
