= Hermidale =

Village in New South Wales, Australia

- Town
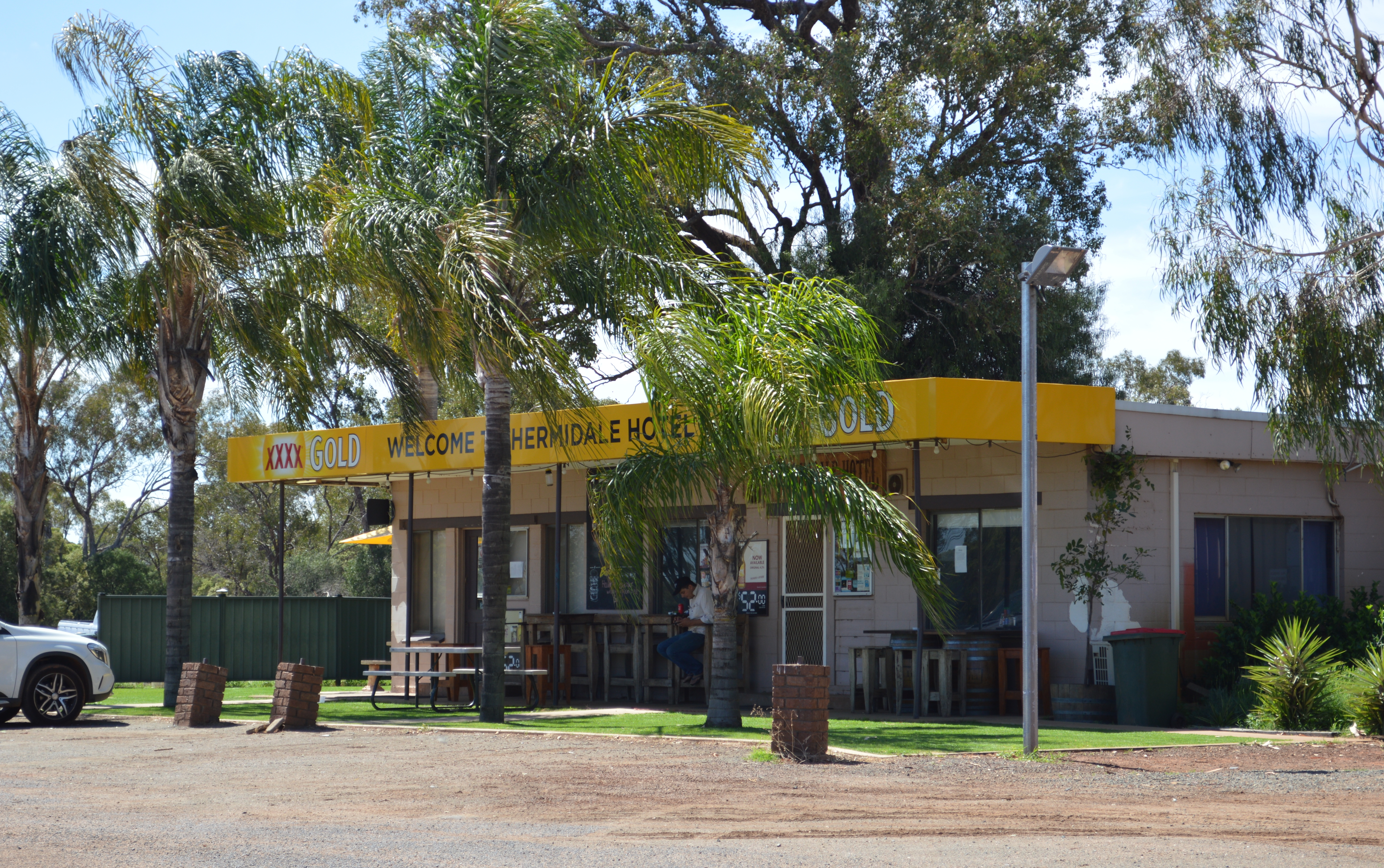
- Hermidale Hotel, 2017

- Interactive map of Hermidale
- Coordinates: 31°31′52.4″S 146°39′55.3″E
- Country: Australia
- State: New South Wales
- Region: Orana
- LGA: Bogan Shire
- Location: 46 km (29 mi) W of Nyngan; 600 km (370 mi) W of Sydney; 87 km (54 mi) E of Cobar

Government
  - State electorate: Barwon
  - Federal division: Parkes

Population
  - Total: 127 (2021 census)
- Postcode: 2831
- County: Canbelego
- Parish: Hermitage

Hermidale is a village in the Orana region of New South Wales, Australia. It is 600km north-west of Sydney and the two closest towns are Nyngan (46 km to the east) and Cobar (87 km to the west). It lies on the Barrier Highway. At the 2021 Census, the population of Hermidale was 127.

The area now known as Hermidale is part of the traditional lands of Wangaaypuwan dialect speakers (also known as Wangaibon) of Ngiyampaa people. After settler colonisation, the site of Hermidale lay partly within the County of Canbelego (Parish of Hermitage) and partly within the County of Flinders (Parish of Boree).

The area was originally known to settlers as Hermitage Plains but postal authorities substituted the name Hermidale, in 1892, initially leading to some confusion with distant Armidale. What would become the village site lay astride the route of the Cobar railway line and a station was opened there in 1892. The village of Hermidale was proclaimed on 18 July 1896. Sales of land took place in mid-1897. The public school opened in 1901.

There were many mines near Hermidale, the most important of which was the Budgery Copper Mine (north-west of the village). There were also some small gold mines in the far west of the modern-day locality, around Muriel Tank. Hermidale was initially the rail connection location for the mines at Nymagee but the opening of the Budgery Copper Mine brought some prosperity to the village from around 1906. In 1923, mining became uneconomic due to low copper prices and the Budgery Mining Co. went into liquidation. By 1924, all levels of the mine were flooded; the mine water contained dissolved copper salts and copper was extracted from it. There was also a village of Budgery—planned in 1908—but its design was cancelled in 1927, leaving Hermidale as the established community in the area.

In 1913, Hermidale was the location of the murder of Mary Jane Greentree.

Unlike other former mining villages in the region, such as the ghost towns of Bobadah and Canbelego, Hermidale has considerable passing traffic, bringing potential customers to the village, due to its location on the Barrier Highway. The village retains a sports ground, tennis courts, post office, public school and one hotel, and it has a small cemetery.

In 2018, it was announced that Hermidale is the site of a new multi-user rail siding that will accommodate trains up to 1,200 metres long. It will enable trains to be loaded more efficiently, while other trains pass on the rail line. The new siding will result in 33,000 tonnes of freight each year being switched from road transport to rail.
