= Walton, New South Wales =

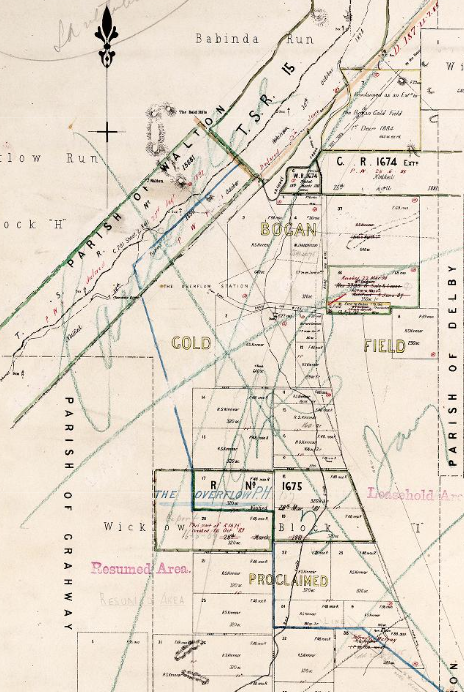
Extract of 1880s parish map of Flinders County, NSW.

Walton is a bounded rural locality, and cadastral parish, 100 kilometres (62 mi) south of Nyngan, New South Wales. It is located at 32°10′26″S 146°34′16″E on Gunningbar Creek near the junction with the Bogan River and is in Bogan Shire and Flinders County. The locality is south of the town of Nymagee, and west of Tottenham, New South Wales.

== History ==
The original inhabitants of the area were the Wiradjuri Aboriginal tribe, though anthropologist Norman Tindale believed the area around The Overflow (opposite bank of the creek) was traditional lands of the neighbouring Wangaibon a tribe of the Ngiyambaa peoples. However this may have been due to an error in one of his source materials.

Thomas Mitchell explored the area around the Bogan River in 1835.
