= Canonba =

- Town
- Interactive map of Canonba
- Coordinates: 31°21′00″S 147°21′00″E
- Country: Australia
- State: New South Wales
- Region: Orana
- LGA: Bogan Shire
- Location: 30 km (19 mi) NE of Nyngan

Government
  - State electorate: Barwon
  - Federal division: Parkes

Population
  - Total: 22 (2016 census)
- Postcode: 2825
- County: Gregory
- Parish: Canonba, North Canonba
Localities around Canonba
Girilambone	Macquarie Marshes	Quambone
	Canonba
Nyngan		Warren

Canonba is a locality in the Orana region of New South Wales, Australia. There was also a village of the same name (sometimes spelt Canonbar or Cannonbar), which is now a ghost town. It lay on Duck Creek, a tributary of the Bogan River, approximately 30 km north-east of Nyngan. Since 1983, the old village site has been known officially as Old Canonba.

== History ==
=== Aboriginal history ===
The area upon which Canonba lay is on the traditional lands of Wangaaypuwan dialect speakers (also known as Wangaibon) of Ngiyampaa people. After colonisation, although dispossessed, the local people remained on their lands; as late as 1889, a corroboree took place near Canonba. In the year 1907, there were 35 Aborigines recorded as living at 'Canonbar'.

The name Canonba may be derived from a local language word for the shingle-back lizard (Tiliqua rugosa). Early settlers recalled the word as Carringbung.

=== Settler colonisation, conflict and killings ===
The association of colonial settlers with the area dates from in 1829, when an expedition led by Hamilton Hume crossed Duck Creek. During the return journey of the second expedition of the explorer and surveyor-general Sir Thomas Mitchell, in 1835, Duck Creek, a little to the north of what became Canonba, was surveyed by James Larmer, an assistant-surveyor and second-in-command of the expedition. Mitchell returned to the area, in January 1847, when his third expedition camped for two weeks at the 'ponds of Canonba', which would later become the site of the village.

The area between the Macquarie and the Bogan Rivers contains other watercourses, including Duck Creek, Gunningbar Creek, Crooked Creek and Marra Creek. Although the area was a semi-arid saltbush plain, the watercourses, waterholes, and billabongs improved the potential of the area for grazing, encouraging some settlers to move into the area, even though the same water sources were precious to the traditional owners. The area was outside the boundary of the Nineteen Counties—within which the colonial government of New South Wales allowed settlers to purchase land—but, from 1836, specific sections of land could be leased there for an annual payment, under the Squatting Act, 1836.

The area was the site of frontier violence in late 1841. Seeking water for their stock during a dry period, seven stockmen—working for William Lee and Joseph Moulder—drove 600 head of cattle off a legal grazing lease and into the area near the Canonba waterhole. It seems the cattle muddied and polluted the waterhole angering the traditional owners, who attacked the stockmen, killing three, and wounding three others. A stockman who was away from the main group, used his pistol to cover the wounded survivors as they escaped. Mounted Police from Bathurst, augmented by some stockmen, made a reprisal attack, at Duck Creek, that became a massacre. A contemporary report stated—although it was not known for certain how many died—there were fifteen or as many as thirty Aborigines killed. Only three of the Aborigines who died were identified as being involved in the stockmen's deaths. The party captured three other Aboriginal men, supposed to be involved in the stockmen's deaths, one of whom later escaped.

Even at the time, the actions of the Mounted Police were highly controversial. They had set out, during the absence of their commander, to assist the stockmen—who themselves had been acting illegally—carried out a frontier policing role normally that of the Border Police—under the command of local Commissioner for Crown Lands, Allman—and had killed many Aborigines who, although of the same tribe, were innocent of the killing of the stockmen. For his part in causing the original trouble with the Aborigines, Governor Gipps revoked Lee's lease. The other effect of the violence was that further settlement in the area between the Bogan and the Darling was banned, in effect, until around 1860. Sadly, this was far from the only incident of horrific frontier violence and killing near the Bogan River during the 1840s.

=== The village of Canonba ===
==== Growth and heyday ====
By the very early 1850s, squatters were taking up runs in the district officially. A prominent early settler was John Brown, who had a landholding called 'Canonba' on Duck Creek. A hotel and store were built on part of Brown's land and, in September 1853, the government reserved a piece of nearby Crown Land as the site of a village. This circumstance could have led to a settlement partially on the government village reserve—on the north-east side of Duck Creek—and partially on Brown's land, on the south-west, or left, bank. The privately owned section was sometimes referred to as 'Brownstown'. However, a bridge crossing Duck Creek and connecting the two parts of the village site was not completed until 1874 and, probably for that reason, the village seems to have developed mainly on the south-west side of the creek.

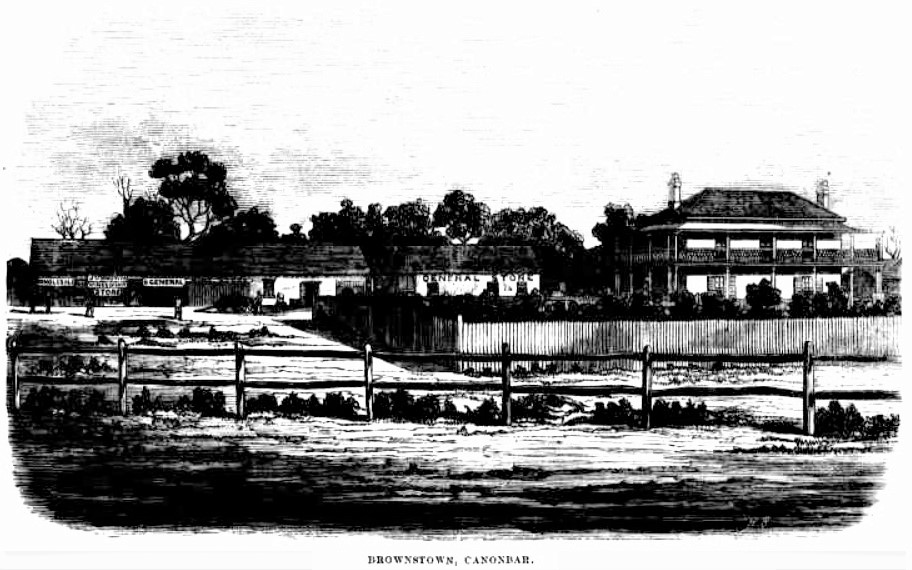
Part of the village of Canonba c.1874 The two-storey building is probably John Brown's house.

Canonba's position between the Macquarie and Bogan Rivers, its water, and its good soil were advantages of its location. In 1858, a post office was opened there, with a police station following in 1864. The village was proclaimed in 1866 and a town plan published in the same year, making it one of the earliest official settlements of the region. During the next 15 years, the village grew to be the main settlement in the region west of Dubbo. It was the site of cattle and sheep sales, the point from which the mail service for Bourke started, and a stopping place on the Cobb & Co.'s stage coach route from Dubbo to Bourke.

The town was badly affected by a flood in July 1867. Brown erected the first levies in the area to protect his properties in the town, but two hotels, Canonba and Isaac's hotels, were flooded.

In 1870, Canonba was described as "rather a nice town, being built principally of brick, and is in the heart of one of the finest squatting districts in the colony." By 1870, the village had a court of petty sessions, three public houses with a fourth on the way, some stores, and the usual trades of a rural settlement—saddle and harness makers, blacksmiths, tailors, bootmakers, wheelwrights—orchards and a vineyard; John Brown had built himself a double storey house of brick, overlooking what was by then being called a town, and a public schoolhouse awaiting a teacher. A school opened—unofficially—in 1871 but closed in 1872, being without an officially appointed teacher. A new schoolhouse was built by the government and opened in 1878. By 1874, probably on the right bank of Duck Creek, there were two acres of vegetable gardens operated by ethnic-Chinese market gardeners.

In 1881, the population reached what was probably its peak of 472.

==== Decline ====
In 1883, the Main Western railway line bypassed Canonba and instead ran to what is now the site of Nyngan—where the line crossed the Bogan River—resulting in the establishment of a rival settlement there around 1882. Another settlement nearby, Girilambone, was established, in 1880 as a private town associated with a copper mine, and it was also on the railway line from 1884. These developments led to the almost total decline of Canonba, in only a few years.

Many residents left Canonba and moved to Nyngan. A number of Canonba's houses and other buildings were pulled down and relocated to Nyngan. Businesses and public institutions followed. By 1887, the town no longer had a bank, just one public house and one store, and its church was described as "roofless walls", its belfry having been dismantled. John Brown, the 'King of Canonbar' and the driving force behind the village, although immensely wealthy, was in decline himself; around 1881, he had retired to Emu Hall at Emu Plains, where he died in 1888. The school closed in 1890. By the 1891 census, there were only 58 inhabitants and 12 dwellings left.

The design of the village was altered to reduce the scale of the settlement and more realistically reflect its diminished future prospects. Canonba lingered on as a rural hamlet for a time, still significant enough to be a polling place into the early 1930s. The post office, named 'Cannonbar', closed in late 1924. Canonba gave its name to the surrounding area and its Pasture Protection Board, then faded away completely.

Canonba lost its status as a village, in 1983, and was officially renamed 'Old Canonba'.

==== Remnants ====
The old village site lies just on the upstream side of where the modern-day Canonba Road crosses Duck Creek. One of its streets, Duck Street, still appears on maps—although its alignment no longer follows the old town plan—as do building allotments of the old village. All that is left of Canonba is its neglected cemetery and a boulder marked with a plaque that commemorates the former village. There is no commemoration of the frontier violence and massacres of the 1840s.

== Present day ==
The locality of Canonba is now a quiet rural area, with grazing being the main occupation.
