= Grahway, New South Wales =

Grahway
- Coordinates: 32°12′05″S 146°38′31″E
- Country: Australia
- State: New South Wales
- LGA: Bogan Shire Council
- Location: 618 km (384 mi) from Sydney

Government
  - State electorate: Barwon
  - Federal division: Parkes
- Elevation: 168 m (551 ft)
- Postcode: 2877

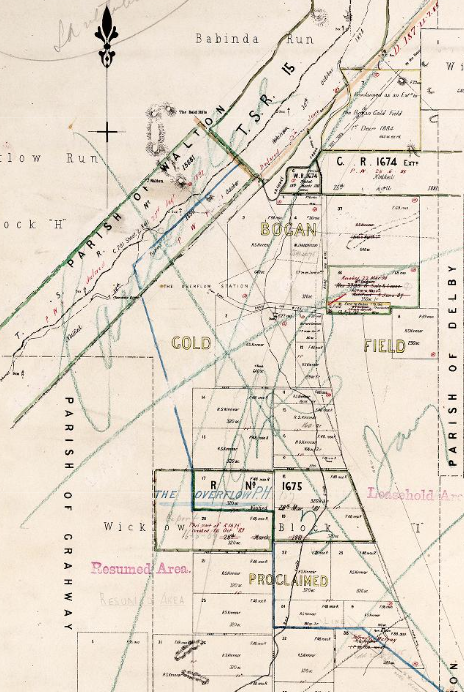
extract of 1880s parish map of Flinders County NSW.

Grahway is a bounded rural locality, and cadastral parish, 100 kilometres south of Nyngan, New South Wales. It is located at 32°12′05″S 146°38′31″E on Gunningbar Creek near the junction with the Bogan River and is in Bogan Shire and Flinders County. The locality is 32 kilometres south of the town of Nymagee, and west of Tottenham, New South Wales.

== History ==
The original inhabitants of the area were the Wiradjuri Aboriginal tribe, though anthropologist Norman Tindale believed the area around "The Overflow" was traditional lands of the neighboring Wangaibon a tribe of the Ngiyambaa peoples. though this may have been due to an error in one of his source materials.

Thomas Mitchell explored the area around the Bogan River in 1835. The sheep station "The Overflow" made famous with the poem Clancy of the Overflow by Banjo Paterson, is located 1 km south of the Parish.
