= Miandetta, New South Wales =

Miandetta
- Town
- Interactive map of Miandetta
- Coordinates: 31°34′02″S 146°58′26″E
- Country: Australia
- State: New South Wales
- Region: Orana
- LGA: Bogan Shire
- Location: 110 km (68 mi) E of Cobar; 21.5 km (13.4 mi) W of Nyngan; 574 km (357 mi) NW of Sydney

Government
  - State electorate: Barwon
  - Federal division: Parkes

Population
  - Total: 23 (2021 census)
- Postcode: 2825
- County: Flinders, Canbelego
- Parish: Gilgai, Coreen

Miandetta is a locality in the Bogan Shire, within the Orana region, of New South Wales, Australia. There was once a small settlement, also known as Miandetta. The locality had a population of 23, in 2021.

== Location and name ==
The locality lies on both sides of the Barrier Highway and Cobar railway line, between Nyngan and Hermidale. The area now known as Miandetta is part of the traditional lands of Wangaaypuwan dialect speakers (also known as Wangaibon) of Ngiyampaa people. After settler colonisation, the site of Miandetta lay partly within the County of Canbelego (Parish of Coreen) and partly within the County of Flinders (Parish of Gilgai). The name Miandetta is said to be derived from an Aboriginal word meaning 'bend in river'. Miandetta is also the name of a parish that extends as far east as the Bogan River. Miandetta was also the name of the North Sydney home of Edmund Barton, although it appears unconnected to the locality.

== History ==
The railway line to Cobar opened in 1892. In July 1892, a station opened, as Pangee; it was renamed Minadetta in August 1893. It was also referred to as Miandetta Siding. In 1903, a crossing loop was placed at Miandetta, to allow trains on the single-track railway to pass one another.

Village Reserve No. 24021 was notified at Miandetta siding in the Parish of Coreen on 18 April 1896. Village lots were laid out. There was some mining activity in the area, from 1906 to 1908, but the mines did not prove viable. In April 1905, the village held a horse race meeting, with four races including one for the 'Miandetta Cup'.

A triangular-shaped forested area to the south-west of the old village's site is reserved, as the Miandetta State Forest, and approximately 3 km to the north is the Thorndale State Forest. In the past, there was tree-felling and saw-milling in the area, probably to provide logs and timber for the mines near Cobar. Most other land in the locality was cleared for agricultural purposes, but the area had no natural sources of water, and was dependent upon rainfall.

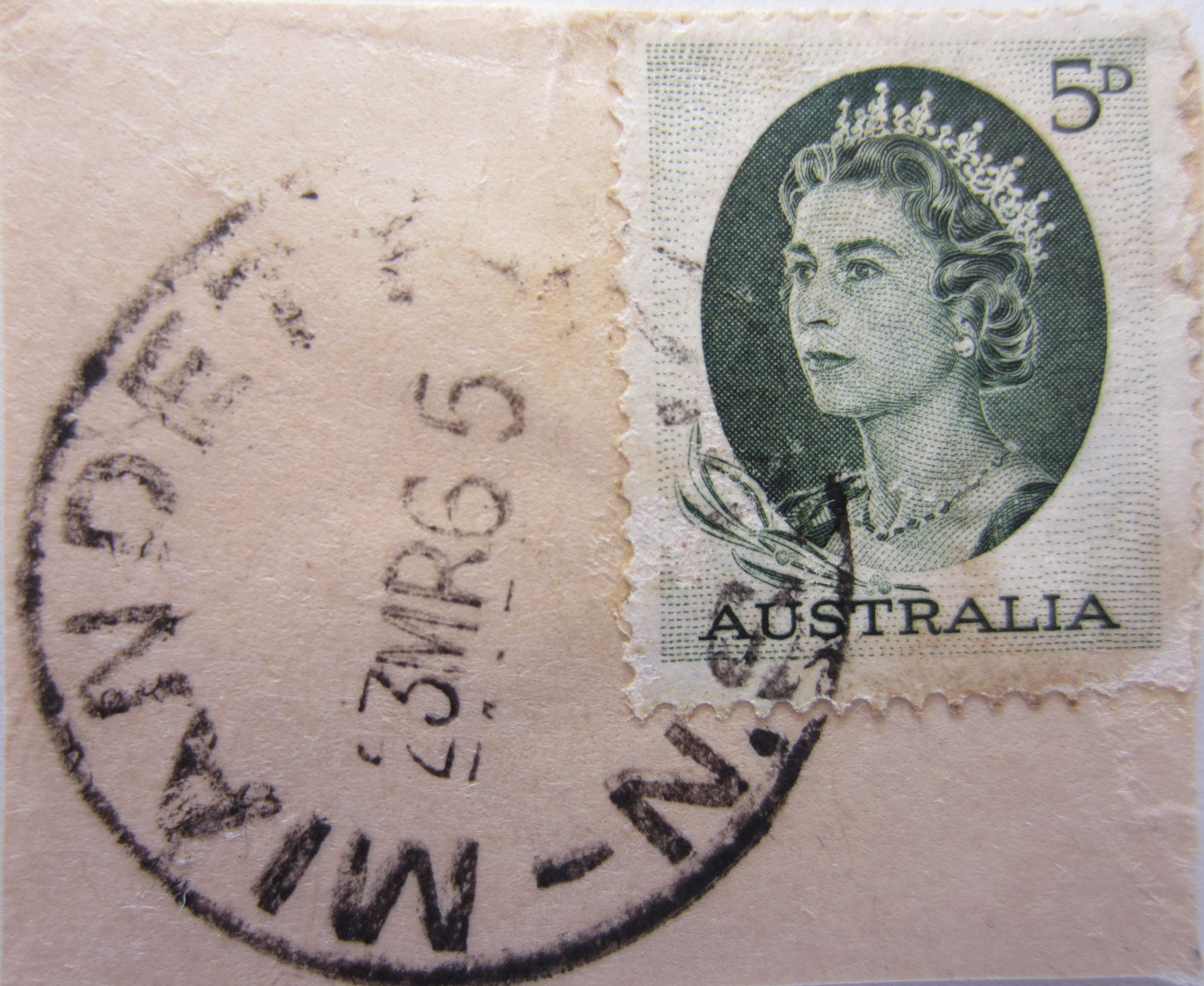
Miandetta, N.S.W. - postmark

There was a hotel known as the Federal House Hotel, later better known as the Federal Hotel. It was in operation by early 1907. It burnt down in October 1928. A new hotel building opened in May 1930, but it too burnt down in March 1932, and was not rebuilt. From around 1915 until at earliest 1962, Miandetta had a public hall, which was used as a venue for dances and functions.

Initially, there was no post office, but a post box there was serviced by guards on the passing trains. A post office was established at Miandetta, and in August 1908, the postmistress was convicted and sentenced to three months imprisonment, for the theft of a letter containing a cheque. The post office closed in 1976.

There was a provisional school from September 1912 until May 1945.

== Present day ==
The railway line to Cobar continues in operation, as a freight-only railway, but the platform, siding and passing loop, at Miandetta, are all gone. There is nothing left of the village today, but the plan of the building allotments of the small village—ten blocks of land, the old school site, and two streets—still appears on modern maps, and some roads converge at the former village's location. Buildings in the area today are outside the old village's plan, and are not remnants of the old village. The locality remains primarily agricultural.
