= Bobadah =

Village in New South Wales, Australia

- Town
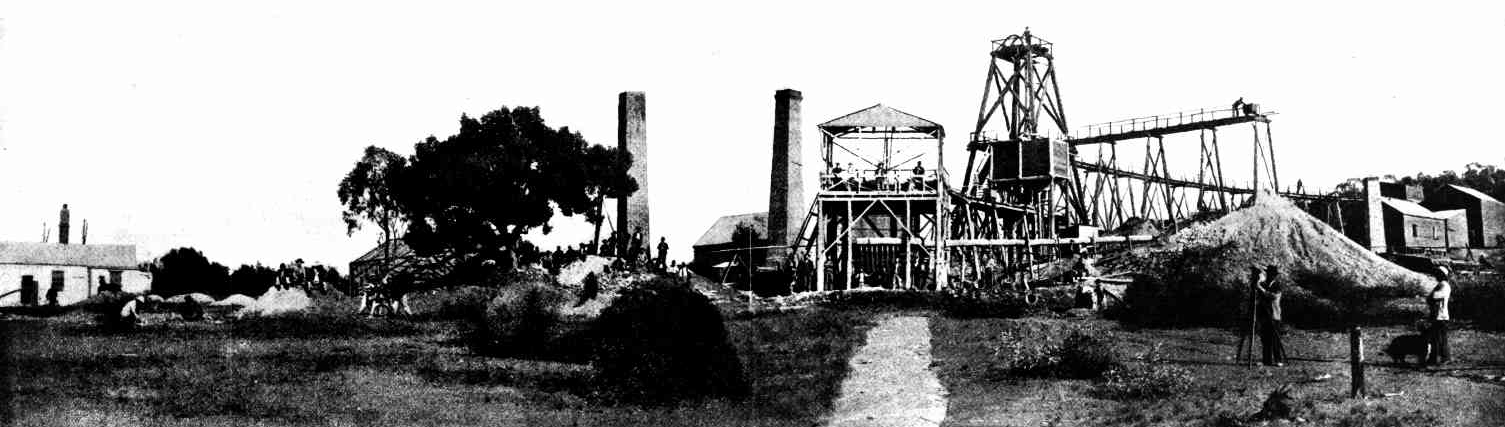
- Overflow Mine, Bobadah, c.1901.

- Interactive map of Bobadah
- Coordinates: 32°18′27.3″S 146°41′31.1″E
- Country: Australia
- State: New South Wales
- Region: Orana
- LGA: Bogan Shire
- Location: 111 km (69 mi) S of Nyngan; 563 km (350 mi) NW of Sydney

Government
  - State electorate: Barwon
  - Federal division: Parkes

Population
  - Total: 10 (2016 census)
- Postcode: 2877
- County: Flinders
- Parish: Cameron

Bobadah was a mining village, now a locality, in the Orana region of New South Wales, Australia. The village was also known as Carpina, its official name, although that name was rarely used. It is now a ghost town, with its community hall being its last remaining building. It was once a larger settlement associated with the nearby Overflow Mine. The name, Bobadah, is now also applied to the surrounding rural locality, for statistical and postal purposes. Its population in 2021, including the surrounding area, was 30, up from 10 in 2016.

== Location ==
By road, Bobadah is 563 km north-west of Sydney, 108 km north-west of Condobolin, 111 km south-west of Nyngan and 153 km south-east of Cobar. The two nearest settlements are Nymagee, 53 km to the north-west, and Tottenham, 76 km to the east. Its location has been claimed to be at the centre of New South Wales, both east-west and north-south.

== History ==
=== Aboriginal history ===
The site that would become Bobadah is part of the traditional lands of Wangaaypuwan dialect speakers (also known as Wangaibon) of Ngiyampaa people. The area is west of the traditional lands of Wiradjuri people, which extend to around Condobolin. Small stone flakes created by tool making have been found in the area, and it may have been a meeting place.

The name, Bobadah, is of Aboriginal origin and said to mean "never failing water supply". The other name of the village, Carpina, is also of Aboriginal origin and said to mean "a small bird's egg found here in great numbers".

=== Mining village ===
After settler colonisation, the site of Bobadah was within the Parish of Cameron in the County of Flinders, about 10km south of the homestead of the famous "The Overflow" sheep station. A deposit of silver-lead ore was found on that station in 1895, near to what would become Bobadah.

The deposit outcropped on a ridge to the north of the future village site, over about one kilometre, and contained ores of gold, copper, silver, lead, and zinc. The deposit became the site of the Overflow Mine. By 1897, mining and cyanide extraction of silver was underway. Multiple shafts were sunk by the Overflow Mine, in its early years.

By October 1896, the Chief Inspector of Mines, William Slee, had laid down a street—probably the one later called Slee Street—for a mining settlement to be called Bobadah. However, in April 1897, a surveyor, O’Connor, laid out a plan for a village to be called Carpina, at the same general location. The Village of Carpina was proclaimed on 3 November 1897, but the commonly used name remained Bobadah.

By 1898, Bobadah had a population of between 300 and 400—many of whom were children—three hotels—the Royal Hotel, the Bobadah Hotel, and another run by a Mr Cooper—four stores, a boarding house, sawmill, baker, butcher. watchmaker and newsagent, but no clergyman. From as early as 1907 to at least 1922, the town hosted a day of horse racing.

A public school opened in August 1897, closed in May 1923, and reopened in 1943. A police station opened in 1900. Bobadah's post office opened in 1897. Bobadah interests agitated for a railway to run via Bobadah, for many years, but the railway was never built.

In 1919, a disgruntled former employee of the village's remaining hotel, the Royal Hotel, was found not guilty of an attempt to burn it down. The hotel was still operating as late as 1925.

Bobadah's growth never met the early expectations, with its fate tied to that of the Overflow Mine. There were issues with treating the complex ores—containing silver, gold, copper and lead ores and pyrite—and an early attempt to use a water-jacket blast furnace around 1899 was an expensive and complete failure. The mine was an early adopter of the cyanide process, and the grinding its ores in a ball mill, but had difficulties applying these technologies. The presence of lead and copper in the ore being treated using cyanide prevented effective processing by that method. The mine's operator seemed to have had difficulty in determining which of the various minerals present should be the object of the mining. An attempt in 1899 to auction 110 residential lots in Bobadah met with little interest, perhaps due to their cost or to the doubtful future of the mine.

By 1900, the first phase of mining was over and there were said to be only 40 people left in the town. Its other problems were compounded by a lengthy drought that deprived the mine of water need for operation. Mining resumed at the Overflow Mine, in 1901, under new ownership but with the same mine manager, and in May of that year, the population was 96. Mining continued, sporadically, and the village population grew once again. During 1912 and to at least early 1913, the Overflow Mine was being worked by tribute miners, but there was also a second mine, 'Sullivan's Wonder', to the south of the town. The Overflow Mine was not worked to any significant extent between 1914 and 1922. A Prospecting Miners' Association Mining was formed and mining resumed during the 1930s. The Overflow Mine closed for the last time in 1942.

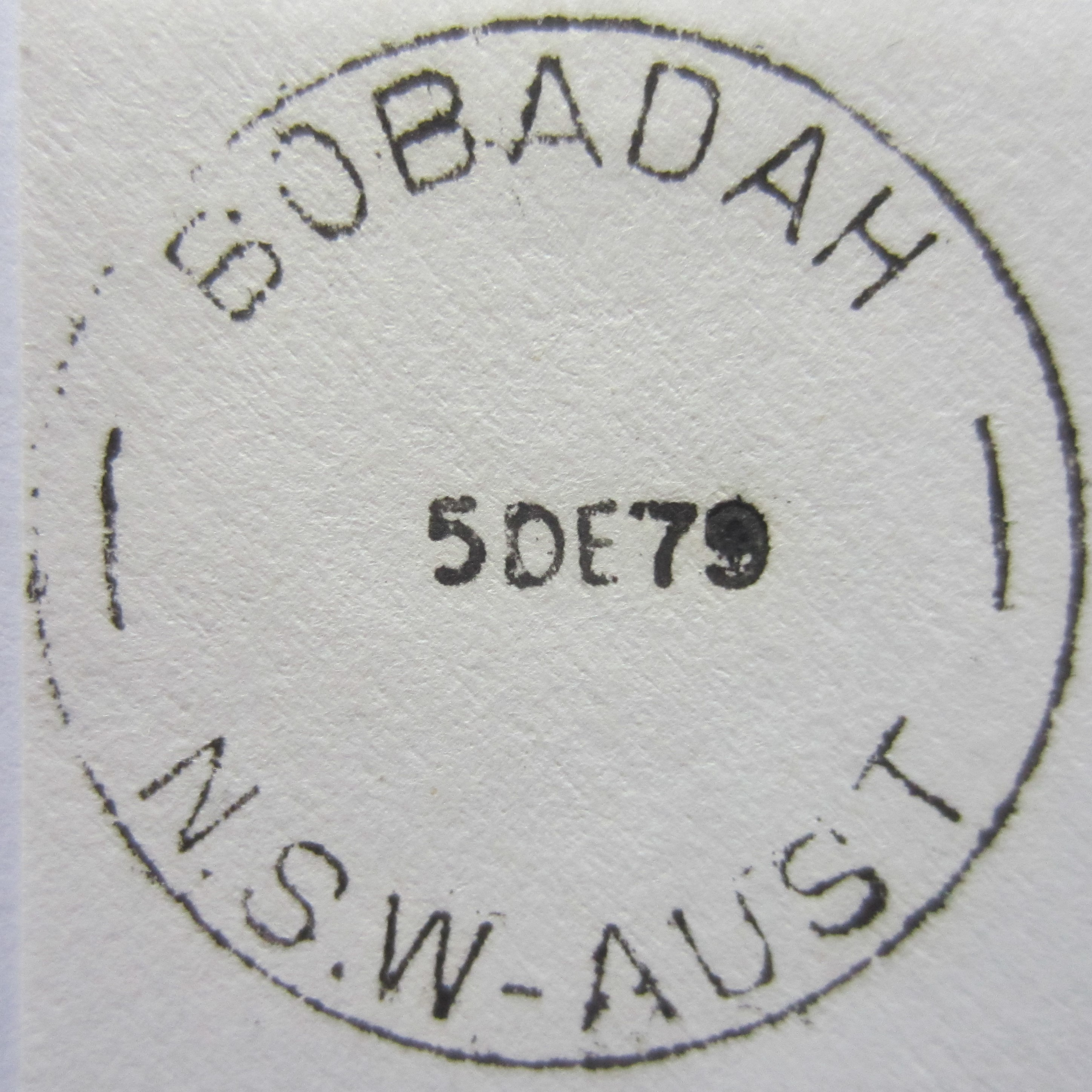
Postmark from the last day of operation of the post office at Bobadah, 5 December 1979.

=== After mining ===
The story of Bobadah after the mine closed is one of a gradual decline. The plan of the village was altered more than once to reduce its size and more realistically reflect its diminished future prospects. In 1931, Bobadah's population was 547. In 1947, after mining had ceased, the village no longer had a hotel and, aside from the hall, there were less than a dozen buildings left. It was said of Bobadah that, "The decadent buildings, general dilapidation of surroundings tell the sad story of years of decline." In 1954, Bobadah was described as a 'ghost town', and the population had sunk to 143, although some hopes were raised by the discovery of uranium in the area.

Although there was grazing in the area, Bobadah's remoteness, lack of employment, and the economic gravity of other settlements caused it to fade away. The school closed in December 1972, followed by the post office in December 1979.

== Remnants ==
The last remaining building is Bobadah's community hall; locals from the surrounding area successfully fought a demolition order and raised money to restore the hall. North of the hall, in 2006, were an open-cut pit, a tunnel and a ventilation shaft, two concrete cyanide tanks, cyanide-process sand tailings, and some other remnants of previous mining activity.

The street plan and the residential lots of Bobadah are still visible in modern day maps, near the location of the Bobadah Hall. Two intersecting roads, at the old village site, still carry the names of village streets; Condobolin Street and Bindiguy Street. Another remnant is the Bobadah-Carpina cemetery.
