= The Overflow =

- Coordinates: 32°12′05″S 146°38′31″E
- Country: Australia
- State: New South Wales
- LGA: Bogan Shire Council
- Location: 618 km (384 mi) from Sydney

Government
  - State electorate: Barwon
  - Federal division: Parkes
- Elevation: 168 m (551 ft)
- Postcode: 2877

The Overflow is a bounded rural locality, cadastral parish and sheep station, 100 kilometres (62 mi) south of Nyngan, New South Wales. It is located at 32°12′05″S 146°38′31″E, on Gunningbar Creek near the junction with the Bogan River and is in Bogan Shire and Flinders County. The locality is 32 kilometres (20 mi) south of the town of Nymagee, and west of Tottenham, New South Wales.

The elevation of The Overflow is 168 metres (551 ft) above sea level.

== History ==
The original inhabitants of the area were the Wiradjuri Aboriginal tribe. However, anthropologist Norman Tindale believed the area around The Overflow was the traditional lands of the neighbouring Wangaibon, a tribe of the Ngiyambaa peoples, though this may have been due to an error in one of his source materials.

Thomas Mitchell explored the area around the Bogan River in 1835.

The Overflow entered the Australian cultural consciousness with the poem "Clancy of the Overflow" by Banjo Paterson, and to a less extent the poems "The Man from Snowy River", and the satirical "Banjo, of the Overflow", as well as the Bulletin Debate, all published about 1888/89. "Clancy of the Overflow" painted a somewhat idyllic picture of rural life, and this idealised Overflow has become somewhat symbolic of the central west of New South Wales.

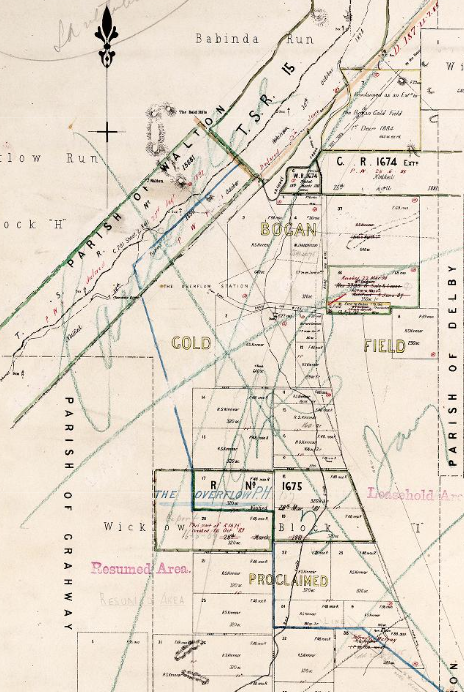
Extract of 1880s parish map of Flinders County, NSW (Note: The map shows the Overflow Sheep Station in central NSW at the time that the poem "Clancy of the Overflow" was written.)

== See also ==
- Bobadah
