= Girilambone, New South Wales =

Girilambone
- Town
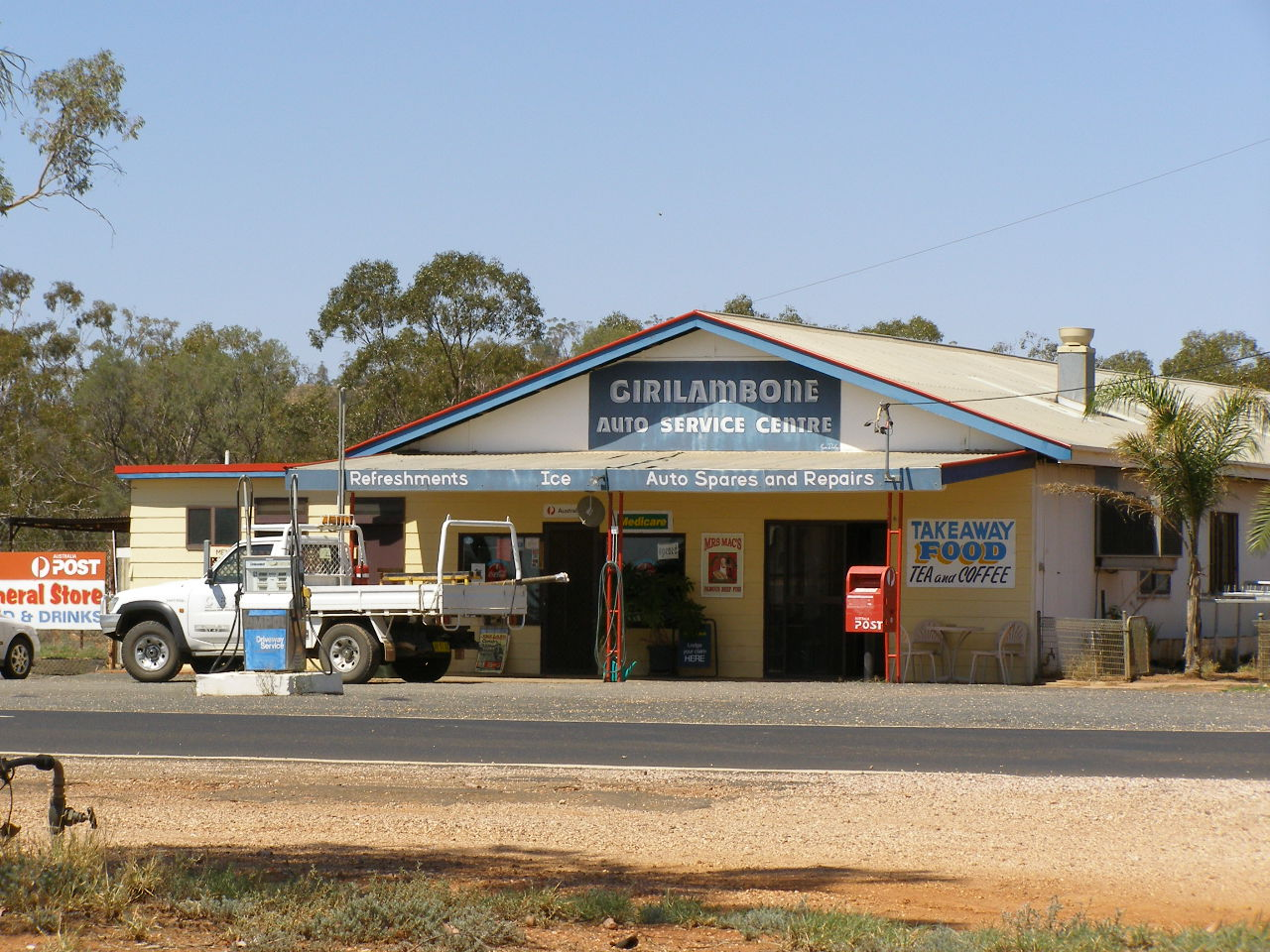
- Petrol station, 2007

- Interactive map of Girilambone
- Coordinates: 31°15′S 146°54′E
- Country: Australia
- State: New South Wales
- Region: Orana (New South Wales)
- LGA: Bogan Shire
- Location: 45 km (28 mi) NW of Nyngan; 156 km (97 mi) SE of Bourke; 610 km (380 mi) NW of Sydney

Government
  - State electorate: Barwon
  - Federal division: Parkes
- Elevation: 195 m (640 ft)

Population
  - Total: 107 (2016 census)
- Postcode: 2831
- County: Canbelego

Girilambone is a small village in western New South Wales, Australia. It is located north of Nyngan and 610 km north-west of Sydney. The name is also applied to the surrounding area, for postal and statistical purposes. At the 2016 census, the population of the village and its surrounding area was only 107, but it had fallen to just 86 in 2021. The village was originally associated with copper mining.

== History ==
=== Aboriginal history and name ===
The area of land now known as Girilambone lies within the traditional lands of the Wangaaypuwan dialect speakers (also known as Wangaibon) of the Ngiyampaa people.

The name Girilambone is an anglicised word, derived from the local language, for 'place of many stars' or 'place of falling stars'. The name is associated with a dreamtime story of the local people. The story may relate to an astronomical event, as a large meteorite was found 70km south-west of Girilambone, in 1909. It was 32kg in weight, but reports seem to differ on whether its surface condition indicated that it landed long ago or more recently.

In 1907, there were no Aboriginal people recorded as living at Girilambone. At the 2021 census, some people living in Girilambone were recorded as having Aboriginal ancestry.

=== Settler history ===
Thomas Hartman found copper carbonate near Girilambone Hill, north-west of Nyngan, in 1875. In 1879, Hartman, Charles Campbell—two of the discoverers of the lode that became the Great Cobar mine—and two others, took out a mineral claim there. However, their claim was disputed, and it was withdrawn, after Hartman and Campbell concluded that it was only a shallow deposit.

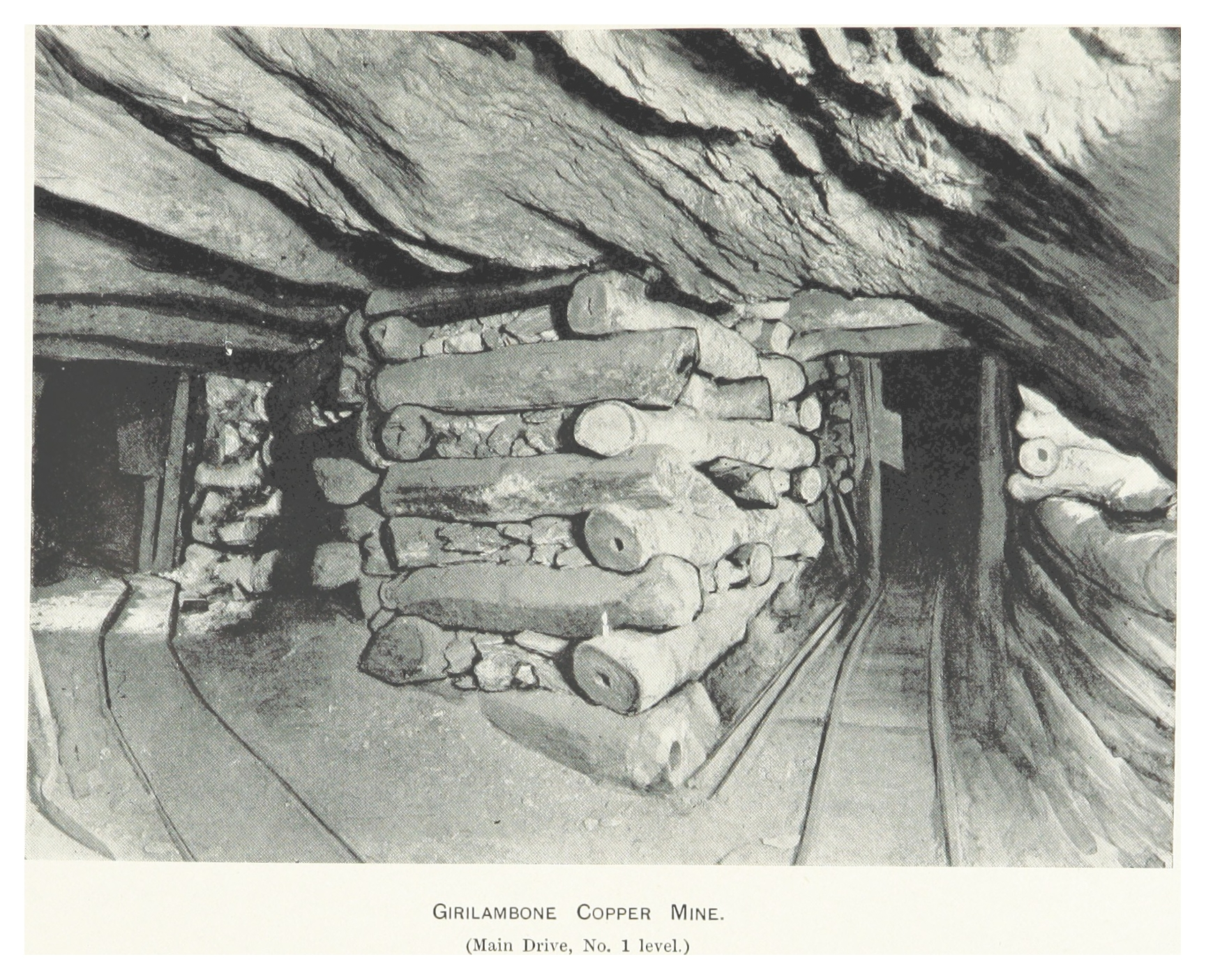
Copper mine, 1899

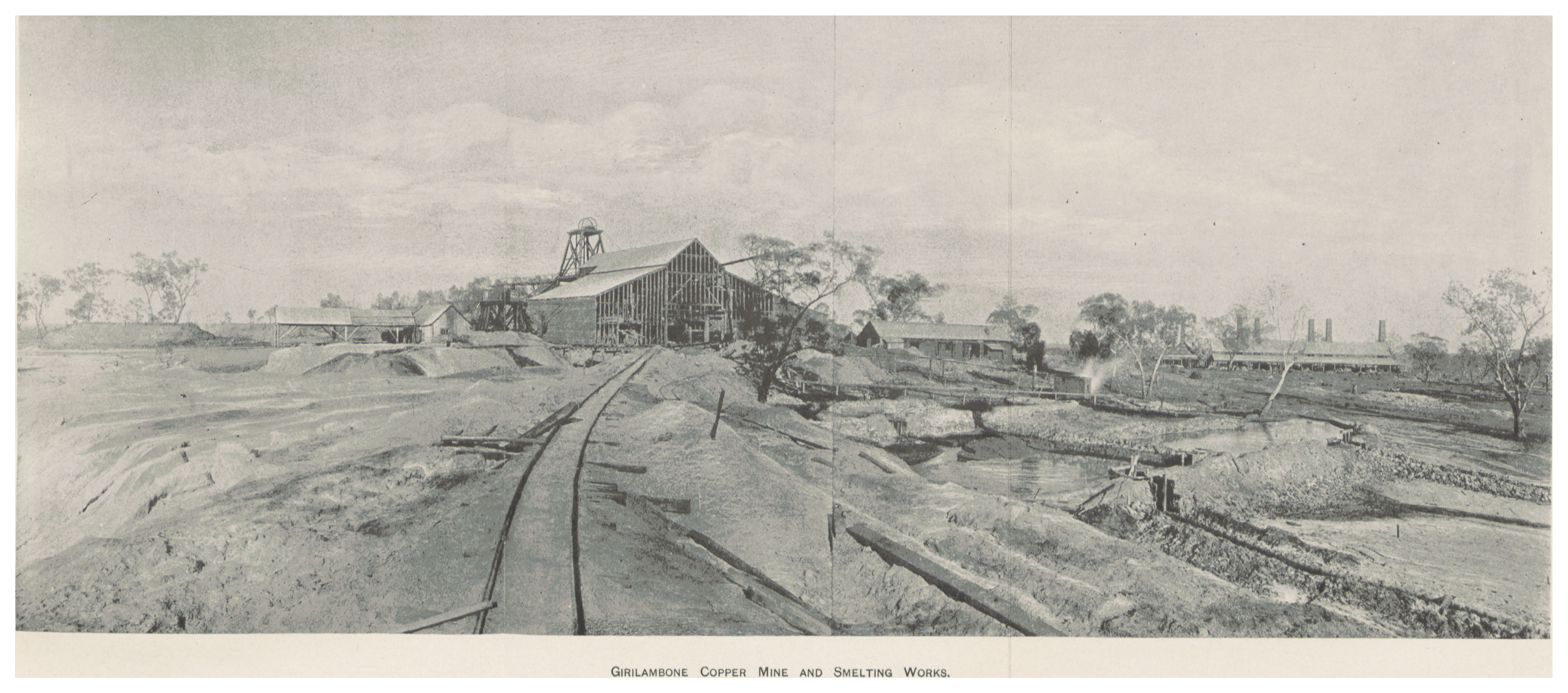
Copper mine and smelting works, 1899

In March 1881, the Girilambone Copper Mining Company Ltd was formed with a nominal capital of £75,000 in £100 shares. Its directors included Russell Barton, but Hartman and Campbell were not involved. By early 1882, there was already a mining village, known as Girilambone, near the copper mine, and from late 1882, a copper smelter.

In early 1880, mining had commenced on a small scale at the Girilambone Copper Mine—3 km west of Girilambone—and in 1881 a reverberatory smelter was built.

Giriambone was initially founded as a privately owned mining town. In late 1880, a 100-acre block, east of the copper mine and adjacent to the planned railway line, was surveyed and the plan of a private subdivision of it was made. This land is on the western side of the railway line, and two of its streets are the modern-day Sydney Road—then 'Great Northern Road'—and Railway Road. Girilambone originally developed on this land, which was also the site of the first school, which opened in 1882. Other streets of the private town were, Girilambone, Louisa, Oxide, Carbonate, Malachite and Suphate Streets, Australia Parade, and the incongruously-named Rue d'Enfer (named after a former street of Paris).

Thomas Hartman became a hotel keeper, at Girilambone. He lived there for many years, but subsequently moved to Sydney, where he died seven months later, in June 1904.

When the Main Western railway line reached Girilambone in 1884, a government village was surveyed on the eastern side of the new railway line and the railway station was built on that eastern side. The railway station opened, in 1884, with the name 'Giralambone', The station's name was altered to its current form in 1889.

For some decades, there were two Girilambone settlements; the original privately owned mining town—thereafter called Girilambone Mine—and the newer government village of Girilambone vied with each other for dominance. The focus of the settlement gradually shifted to the government village; some businesses migrated to the newer village and others to Nyngan. The town allotments of the older Girilambone, west of the railway line, are still visible on Google Maps but virtually nothing remains of the first Girilambone. This is probably the reason that the Mitchell Highway (Sydney Road) bypasses the village centre; it passes instead along one side of the site of the older private town.

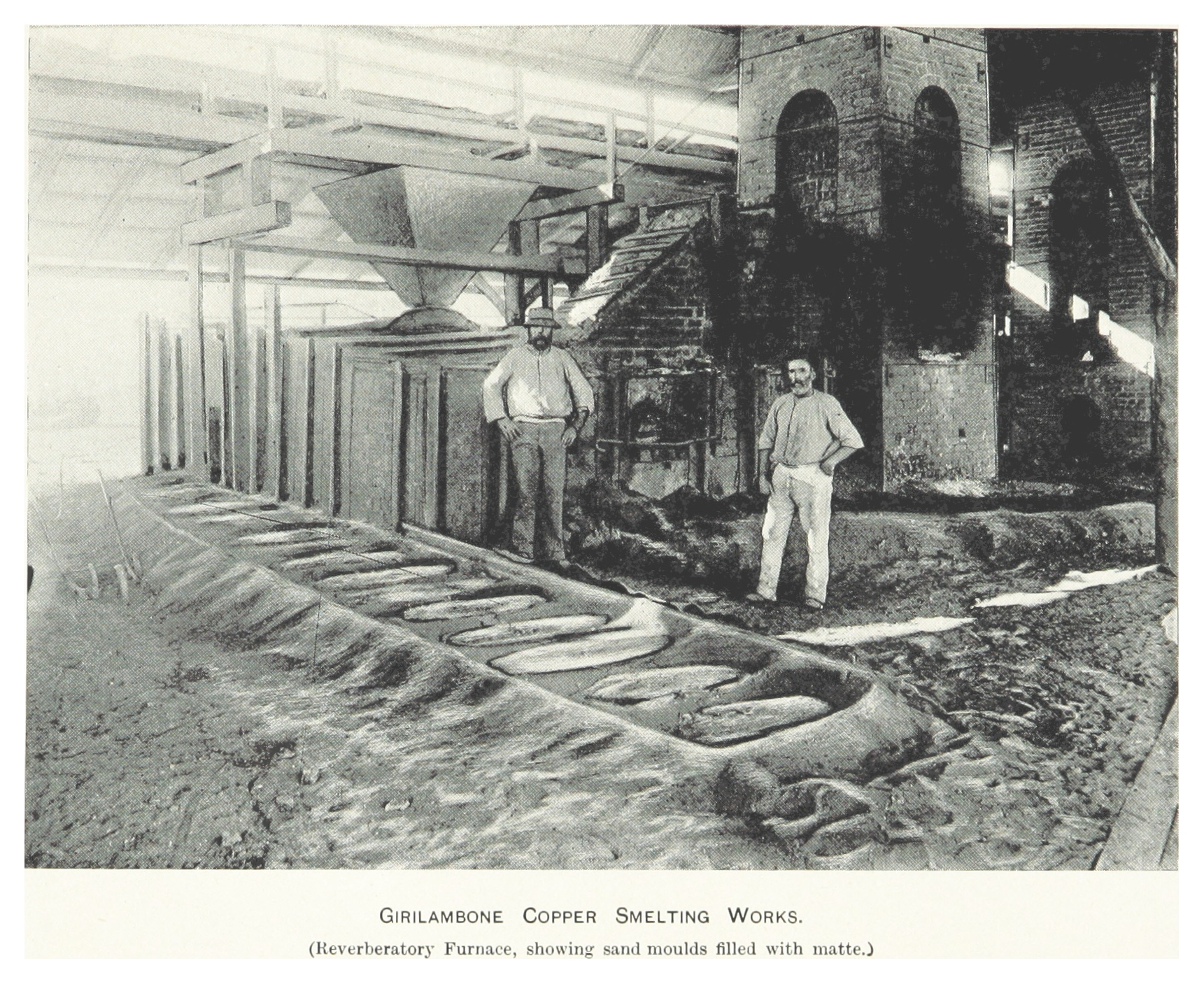
Smelting works, 1899

At the 1891 census, Girilambone had a population of 161 in 34 'habitations'. In 1897, a new public school was opened in the government village—the older school became known as Girilambone Mine Public School, until it closed in 1904—and in 1894 a new post office opened—the older post office (opened in 1881) became known as Girilambone Mine, until it closed in 1919—in the government village. In 1899, a new police station and lock-up was opened.

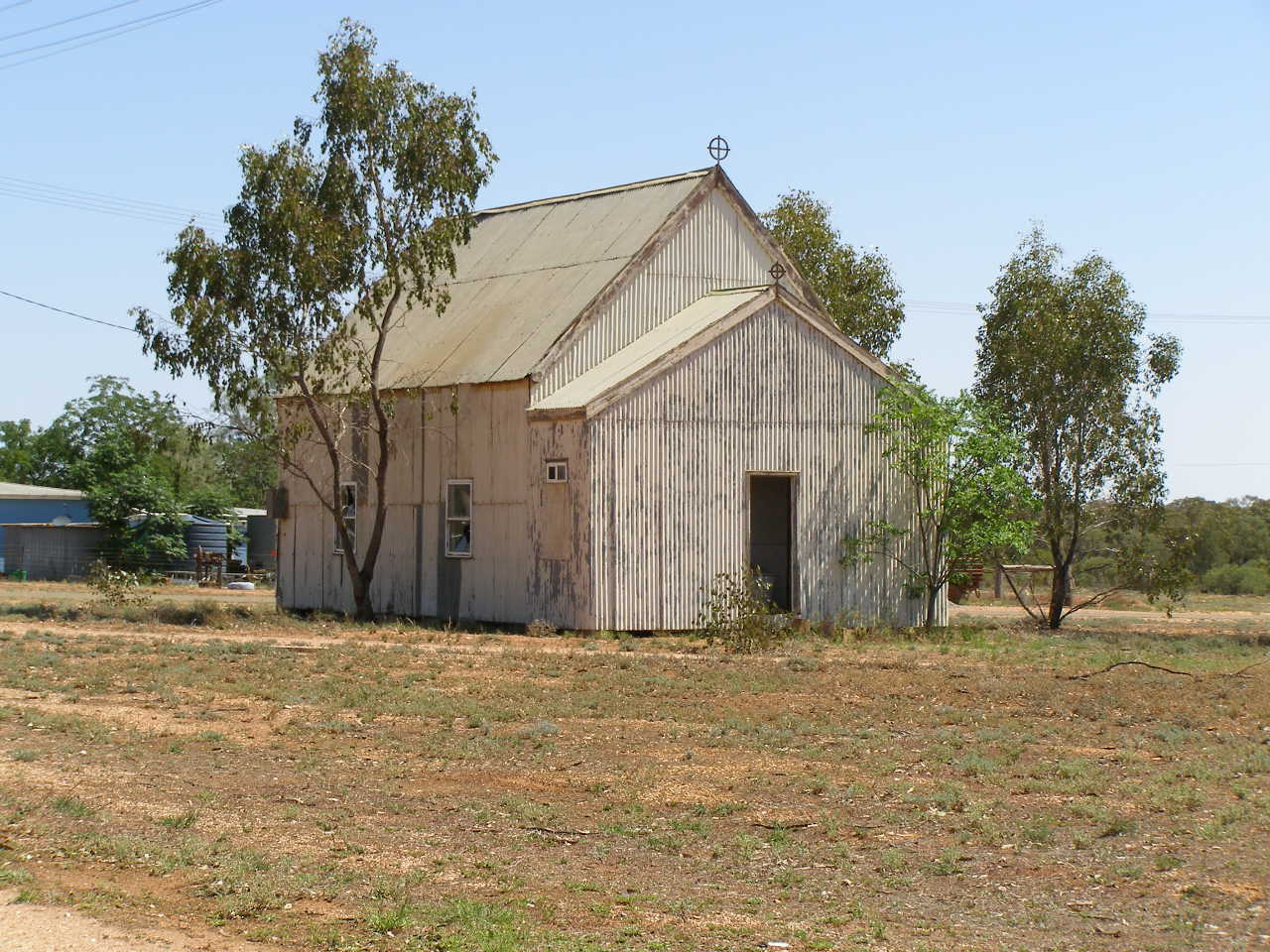
Former Catholic church, 2007

In 1895, the Girilambone Copper Mine—a victim of low copper prices—was sold, as one lot, at auction, by its creditor, the Australian Joint Stock Bank. In 1896, the Girilambone Copper Mining Co. was formed and the main period of copper production began; it lasted until 1901. During this period, the price of copper had increased. On 11 January 1901, buildings at the mine and in the village were extensively damaged—some totally destroyed—by violent winds, described as a 'hurricane.'

From April 1901 onward, the copper price declined, reaching a level, by the end of 1901, at which mining became uneconomic. In 1902, the Girilambone Copper Mining Co.was wound up by its liquidator and its assets transferred into a new company Girilambone Mining Co. (No Liability). Mining restarted and continued until around 1910. There were other mines between Girilambone and Hermidale, some relatively close to Girilambone.

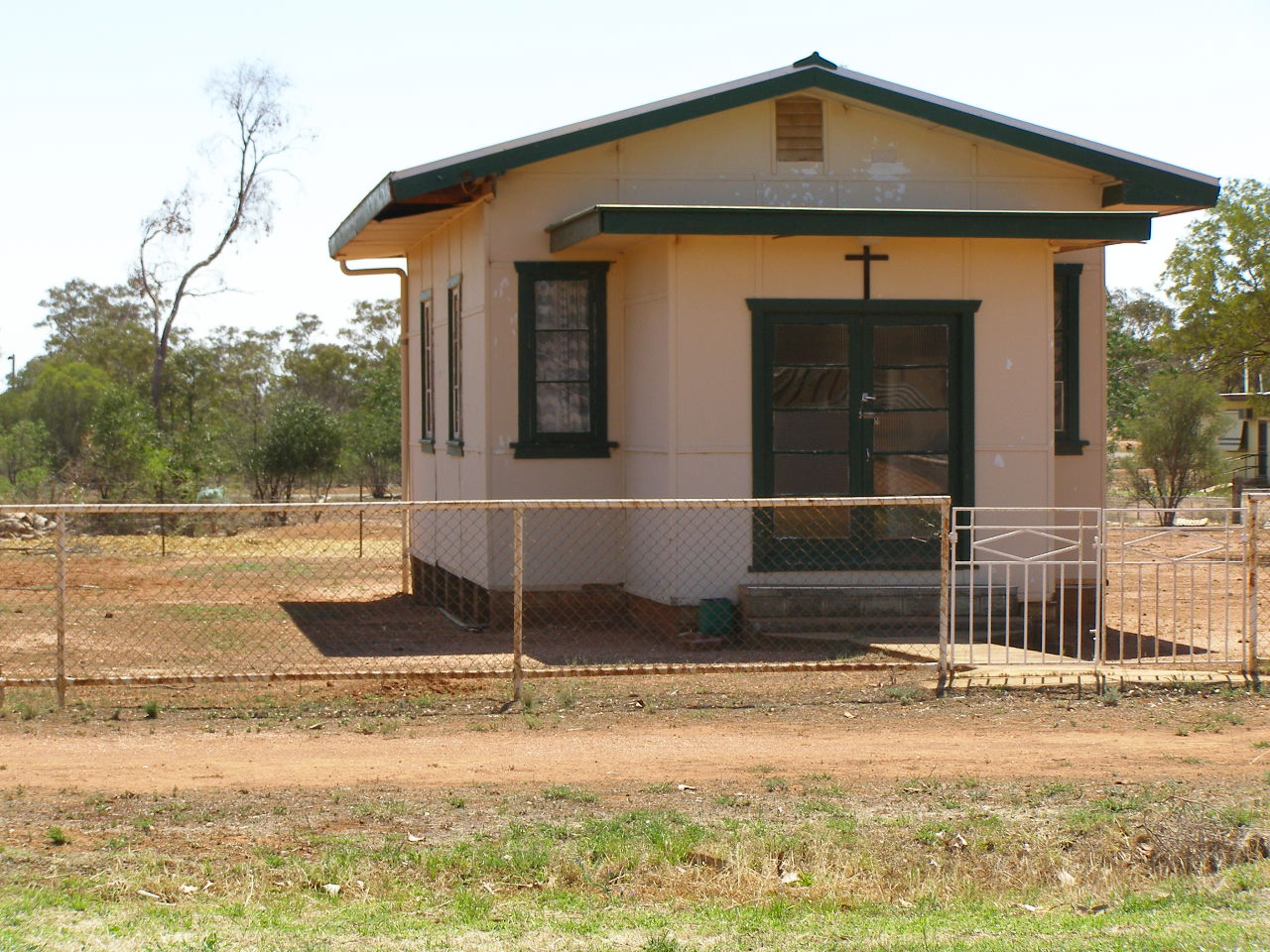
Former St Paul's Anglican Church, 2007

On Sunday 16 July 1898, Reverend Father Daly of the Society of Jesus opened and blessed a Catholic church on the eastern corner of Sirius and Myall Streets (31.2459°S 146.9049°E). It is now closed but still extant.

On Friday 17 January 1913 a Union Church (intended for the use of all denominations) was opened by Mrs Elletson with around 300 people in attendance.

In 1915, Girilambone's population was estimated at 400, but, by 1931, was 317. At the 1933 census, the village's population was 156 with 136 others in the surrounding area.

St Paul's Anglican Church in Myall Street (31.2468°S 146.9057°E) held its first service on 30 August 1925. The church building was a former shop relocated from Cobar, erected by Mr Howarth of Nyngan. It is now closed but still extant in private ownership.

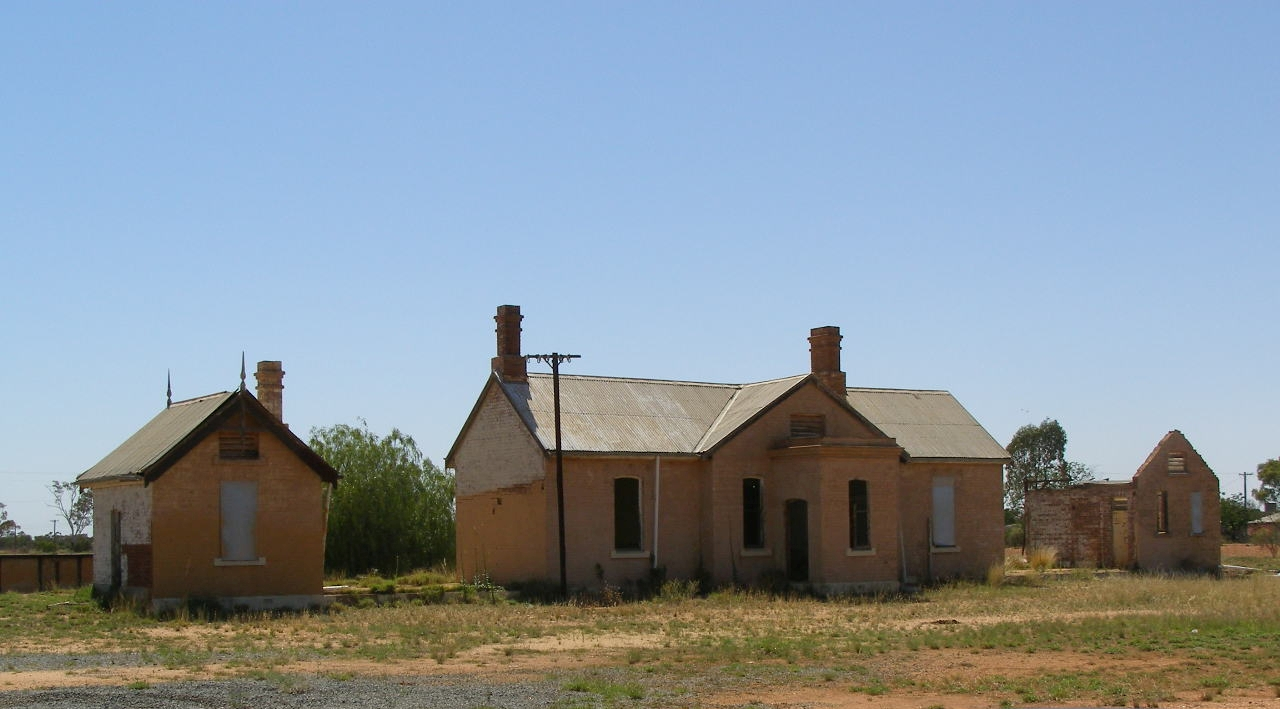
Former railway station buildings, 2007

The police station closed in 1975, and the railway station in 1986.

The village has two cemeteries, one established 1901 on Arcturus Street and an older one on Sydney Road (Mitchell Highway); the Old Girilambone Cemetery lies closer to the original mining settlement, west of the railway, and has not been used for many years. The newer Girilambone Cemetery is the resting place of Helena ('Ellen') Kerz, who was murdered by Jimmy Governor, on 20 July 1900, at Breelong.

The old Girilambone Copper Mine deposit was the upper (oxide ore) levels of a larger deposit, now known as the Murrawombie deposit. This deposit was mined again, by open pit methods, from 1993 to 2002. In 2008, a new underground mine to mine the deeper, sulphide ores was opened but mining was soon suspended due to economic conditions; mining operations restarted in late 2015. Although mining has resumed, that has had little direct benefit to Girilambone.

In 2019, the N.S.W. government announced funding to repair the derelict railway station building and to repurpose it as a visitor centre with a museum and Indigenous art gallery. Work on the restoration and renovation of the old building was well under way in September 2022.

Alfred "Tony" Lodge (1939–2018) was a successful farmer in the area until his departure to Orange, New South Wales with his family in 1977.

Preceding station	Former services	Following station
Coolabah towards Bourke	Main Western Line	Nyngan towards Sydney
