= Wharfdale =

Wharfdale is a bounded rural locality, and cadastral parish south of Nyngan and west of Tottenham, New South Wales.

Warfdale is located at 32°12′54″S 147°02′04″E and is in Bogan Shire and Flinders County. Warfdale is one of the candidates for the geographic centre of the state of New South Wales, and is at an elevation 281 metres (922 ft) above sea level,

The area is named for Wharfedale in Yorkshire.

The original inhabitants of the area were the Wiradjuri Aboriginal tribe, and the first European to visit the area was Thomas Mitchell, who explored the area around the Bogan River in 1835.

Today much of the area is incorporated into the Wharfedale State Forest.
