= Miandetta =

Miandetta may refer to:

- Miandetta, New South Wales
- Miandetta, Tasmania
- Miandetta (house) - the house of Edmund Barton, in Carabella Street, North Sydney, New South Wales (since demolished)
