= WYB =

WYB or wyb may refer to:

- WYB, the National Rail station code for Weybridge railway station, Surrey, England
- wyb, the ISO 639-3 code for Ngiyampaa language, New South Wales, Australia
