= Delby =

Delby may refer to:

- Delby Lemieux (born 2003), American professional football center
- Delby Powless (born 1980), Mohawk lacrosse player
- Delby, New South Wales, Australia

== See also ==
- Dalby (disambiguation)
