= Wharfedale (disambiguation) =

Wharfedale is one of the Yorkshire dales.

Wharfedale may also refer to:

- Wharfedale (company), an electronics manufacturer
- Wharfedale (ward), Bradford, West Yorkshire, England
- Wharfedale Rural District, a former rural district in the West Riding of Yorkshire, England
- Upper Wharfedale School, in North Yorkshire, England

== See also ==
- Wharfdale, New South Wales, Australia
- River Wharfe, Yorkshire, England
- Wharf (disambiguation)
