= Flinders County =

Flinders New South Wales
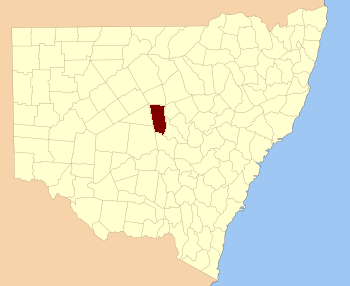
- Location in New South Wales
Lands administrative divisions around Flinders:
Robinson	Canbelego	Oxley
Mouramba	Flinders	Kennedy
Blaxland	Cunningham	Kennedy

Flinders County is one of the 141 cadastral divisions of New South Wales. It is located to the south west of the Bogan River.

Flinders County was named in honour of the navigator, hydrographer, and scientist Matthew Flinders (1774–1814).

The topography is generally flat and the climate has a Koppen Climate Classification of BsK (Hot semi arid).

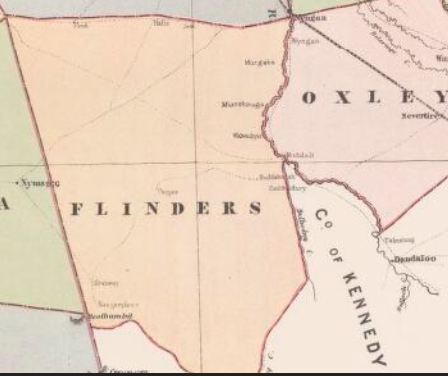
Flinders Country in the late 19th century

The only town of the Parish is Nyngan, which is the seat of local government. The Village of Hermidale is located on the highway which forms the northern border of the country.

== Parishes within this county ==
A full list of parishes found within this county; their current LGA and mapping coordinates to the approximate centre of each location is as follows:

Parish	LGA	Coordinates
Babego	Bogan Shire	31°57′54″S 146°32′04″E
Babinda	Bogan Shire	31°57′54″S 146°30′04″E
Balgay	Bogan Shire	32°07′54″S 147°00′04″E
Barrow	Bogan Shire	31°51′54″S 146°30′04″E
Bebri	Bogan Shire	31°49′54″S 146°38′04″E
Belah	Lachlan Shire	32°08′54″S 147°10′04″E
Birrigan	Bogan Shire	31°37′54″S 146°50′04″E
Boree	Bogan Shire	31°33′54″S 146°42′04″E
Budgery	Bogan Shire	31°33′54″S 146°34′04″E
Budtha	Bogan Shire	32°02′54″S 147°09′04″E
Bulbodny	Lachlan Shire	32°14′54″S 147°10′04″E
Bulga	Bogan Shire	31°43′39″S 146°23′59″E
Bumbaldry	Lachlan Shire	32°23′54″S 147°07′04″E
Burra	Lachlan Shire	32°23′54″S 147°00′04″E
Cameron	Bogan Shire	32°19′37″S 146°44′07″E
Condon	Bogan Shire	31°45′54″S 146°34′04″E
Coolibah	Bogan Shire	31°55′54″S 146°56′04″E
Crowie	Bogan Shire	31°57′54″S 146°36′04″E
Cumbine	Bogan Shire	32°06′28″S 146°30′25″E
Currajong	Bogan Shire	32°04′21″S 146°52′02″E
Delby	Bogan Shire	32°15′57″S 146°43′29″E
Egeria	Bogan Shire	31°43′54″S 146°30′04″E
Firbank	Bogan Shire	31°53′54″S 146°32′04″E
Foster	Bogan Shire	31°33′54″S 146°46′04″E
Geweroo	Bogan Shire	31°38′34″S 146°23′38″E
Gilgai	Bogan Shire	31°37′54″S 147°01′04″E
Gilgai	Bogan Shire	31°35′54″S 146°58′04″E
Grahway	Bogan Shire	32°14′21″S 146°33′05″E
Grayrigg	Bogan Shire	31°39′54″S 146°40′04″E
Hermitage	Bogan Shire	31°55′54″S 146°48′04″E
Hermitage Plains	Bogan Shire	31°53′54″S 146°42′04″E
Honeybugle	Bogan Shire	31°49′54″S 146°56′04″E
Honeybugle	Bogan Shire	31°51′54″S 147°01′04″E
Howgill	Bogan Shire	31°47′54″S 146°30′04″E
Keenan	Bogan Shire	31°41′54″S 146°56′04″E
Keenan	Bogan Shire	31°43′54″S 147°02′04″E
Kinnear	Bogan Shire	32°07′56″S 146°43′28″E
Lambrigg	Bogan Shire	31°39′54″S 146°34′04″E
Merrilba	Bogan Shire	31°55′54″S 147°04′04″E
Miamley North	Lachlan Shire	32°20′52″S 146°54′39″E
Miandetta	Bogan Shire	31°37′54″S 147°06′04″E
Minalong	Lachlan Shire	32°18′54″S 147°10′04″E
Mogille	Lachlan Shire	32°18′38″S 146°50′52″E
Mogille Plain	Lachlan Shire	32°20′54″S 147°00′04″E
Mogundale	Lachlan Shire	32°15′04″S 146°51′07″E
Mullah	Bogan Shire	31°45′54″S 146°36′04″E
Murrabudda	Bogan Shire	31°43′54″S 147°06′04″E
Myall Cowall	Bogan Shire	32°02′54″S 147°04′04″E
Nangerybone	Bogan Shire	32°19′57″S 146°35′48″E
Nardoo	Bogan Shire	31°41′54″S 146°48′04″E
Oberon	Lachlan Shire	32°17′54″S 147°03′04″E
Pangee	Bogan Shire	31°57′54″S 146°42′04″E
Pangee Creek	Bogan Shire	31°49′54″S 146°46′04″E
Quanda	Bogan Shire	31°43′54″S 146°42′04″E
Quondong	Bogan Shire	31°45′54″S 146°52′04″E
Red Gilgais	Bogan Shire	31°57′54″S 146°56′04″E
Red Gilgais	Bogan Shire	32°01′54″S 147°00′04″E
Regan	Bogan Shire	31°51′54″S 146°52′04″E
Talgong	Bogan Shire	32°10′30″S 146°52′11″E
The Bluff	Lachlan Shire	32°27′42″S 146°53′02″E
The Overflow	Bogan Shire	32°12′05″S 146°38′31″E
Umang	Bogan Shire	32°07′54″S 147°04′04″E
Walkers Hill	Bogan Shire	32°23′45″S 146°47′29″E
Walton	Bogan Shire	32°10′26″S 146°34′16″E
Walwa	Bogan Shire	32°06′04″S 146°36′55″E
Wharfdale	Bogan Shire	32°12′54″S 147°02′04″E
Wharfdale North	Bogan Shire	32°11′33″S 146°57′19″E
Whitbarrow	Bogan Shire	31°33′54″S 146°50′04″E
Wicklow	Bogan Shire	31°57′54″S 146°58′04″E
Wicklow	Bogan Shire	31°59′54″S 147°00′04″E
Widgeland	Bogan Shire	31°49′54″S 147°02′04″E
Wilmatha	Lachlan Shire	32°27′54″S 147°03′04″E
Winfell	Bogan Shire	31°39′54″S 146°30′04″E
Yamma	Bogan Shire	31°37′54″S 146°44′04″E
Yarrow	Bogan Shire	31°55′54″S 146°36′04″E
Yoongee	Bogan Shire	31°33′54″S 146°30′04″E
