= Genaren Creek =

Coordinates: 32°26′S 147°51′E

Genaren Creek is a creek in central New South Wales.

Genaren Creek is a tributary of the Bogan River and drops around 26.9m over its 33.9 km length starts at an elevation of 247m and ends at an elevation of 220m flowing into the Bogan River, east of Peak Hill, New South Wales.
