= Emu Hall =

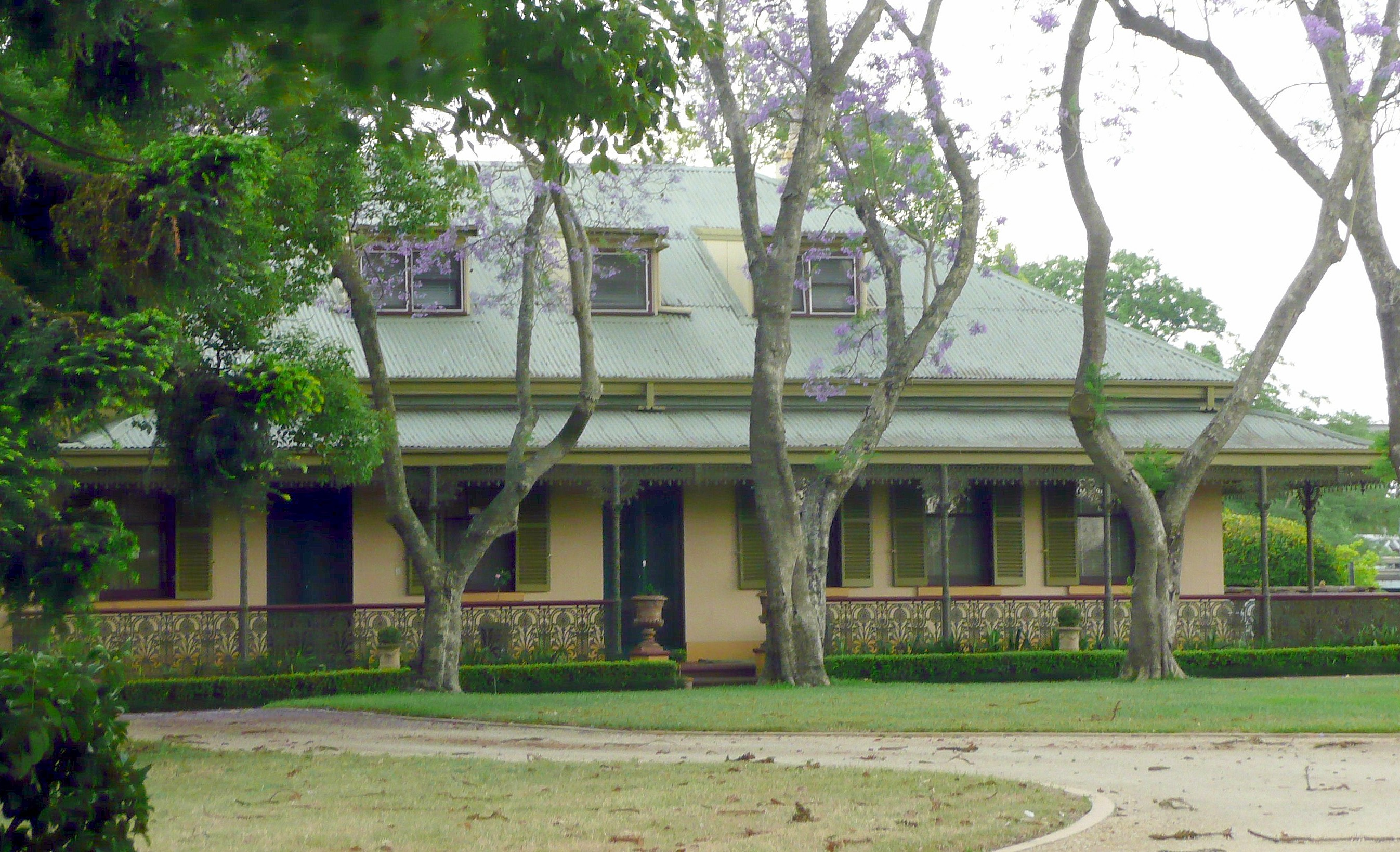

General information
- Type: Rendered face brick and corrugated steel roofed house
- Architectural style: Victorian Italianate
- Location: 2-26 Great Western Highway, Emu Plains, New South Wales, Australia
- Completed: 1854
- Client: James Tobias Ryan
- Owner: Private ownership

Website
- Penrith Heritage Inventory

Emu Hall is a historic house in the Sydney suburb of Emu Plains in the state of New South Wales, Australia. It is 58 kilometres (36 mi) west of the Sydney central business district, in the local government area of the City of Penrith and is part of the Greater Western Sydney region. The house is on the western side of the Nepean River, located at the foot of the Blue Mountains.

== The builder ==
Emu Hall was erected for James Tobias Ryan (1818–1899) between 1851 and 1854. Ryan was a butcher, pastoralist, politician, author and sportsman who was born near Penrith, New South Wales. From 1860 until 1872 he was the member for Nepean in the New South Wales Legislative Assembly. He was a jovial and popular parliamentarian but didn't aspire to a ministerial appointment. Ryan was well known as a sportsman and as a good boxer and crack pigeon shooter. He was also a race-horse owner and breeder as well as a gambling man. This led to his decline and on his death he was penniless.

== Other owners ==
By 1881, the house was the last home of a wealthy grazier, John Brown, formerly of Canonba, who died there in 1888.

In 1904, William George Magrath purchased the home with his wife, Elsie (nee Lonergan, formerly of Wagga Wagga) and it was subsequently taken over upon his death by one of his children, James (Denny) Magrath, and his family; wife, Shirley, and children; Dianne, Bradley (deceased), Rowena, Tracey, and Donna, in 1967. They remained there until 2004 when the property was sold.

== The house ==
The siting of the house in riverside grounds is indicative of a new wealthy class of family in the district during the mid-nineteenth century. As an historic house in a garden setting, it has landmark status on both the highway and river. It has a hipped corrugated steel roof and verandahs to the southern and eastern elevations with cast iron columns, decorative lace friezes and balustrading. Fenestration consists of large sashed windows and french doors. Newer dormer windows have been added to the roof. The house has an enclosed service yard and a free-standing service wing. Within the property there are brick stables and a derelict timber slab barn. In the garden, remnant plantings remain, including clusters of Jacarandas, camphor laurels and bunya pines.

== See also ==
- Australian residential architectural styles
