= Western Plains wine zone =

Western Plains
- Wine region
- Type: Australian Geographical Indication
- Year established: 1996
- Country: Australia
- Part of: New South Wales
- Sub-regions: None
- Grapes produced: Shiraz, Grenache etc.
- No. of wineries: 8

Western Plains is an Australian Geographical Indication for a grape growing zone (larger than a "region") encompassing most of northwestern New South Wales in Australia. It was entered in the Register of Protected Names on 1 May 1996. There are no regions defined in the zone. Most of this zone is arid and unsuitable for grape growing.

There are approximately eight commercial wineries in the Western Plains zone. They are all in the eastern part of the zone, near the towns of Dubbo, Narromine, Warren and Coonabarabran.
