= Canbelego County =

Cadastral in New South Wales, Australia

Canbelego New South Wales
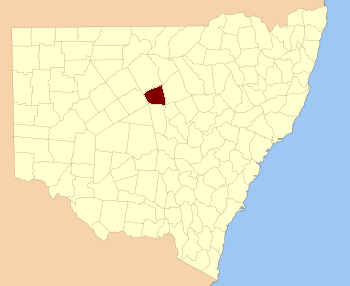
- Location in New South Wales
Lands administrative divisions around Canbelego:
| Yanda | Cowper | Clyde |
| Robinson | Canbelego | Gregory |
| Mouramba | Flinders | Oxley |

Canbelego County is one of the 141 cadastral divisions of New South Wales.

Canbelego is believed to be derived from a local Aboriginal word.

== Parishes within this county ==
A full list of parishes found within this county; their current LGA and mapping coordinates to the approximate centre of each location is as follows:

| Parish | LGA | Coordinates |
|---|---|---|
| Antares | Bogan Shire | 31°05′54″S 146°54′04″E |
| Bannan | Bogan Shire | 31°05′54″S 146°43′59″E |
| Berry | Bogan Shire | 31°06′37″S 146°40′10″E |
| Boree | Bogan Shire | 31°27′54″S 147°04′04″E |
| Carnbilly | Bogan Shire | 31°23′54″S 146°46′04″E |
| Caro | Bogan Shire | 31°23′54″S 146°54′04″E |
| Coreen | Bogan Shire | 31°27′54″S 147°02′04″E |
| Courebone | Bogan Shire | 31°13′54″S 147°00′04″E |
| Currawong | Bogan Shire | 31°27′54″S 146°46′04″E |
| Eton | Cobar Shire | 31°15′26″S 146°25′13″E |
| Florida | Cobar Shire | 31°27′03″S 146°18′18″E |
| Gidalambone | Bogan Shire | 31°11′54″S 146°48′04″E |
| Gilgies | Bogan Shire | 31°30′49″S 146°25′03″E |
| Gilgoenbon | Bogan Shire | 31°25′54″S 147°02′04″E |
| Glenariff | Bogan Shire | 31°00′05″S 146°45′45″E |
| Goyder | Cobar Shire | 31°21′45″S 146°21′06″E |
| Grahweed | Bogan Shire | 31°17′54″S 147°02′04″E |
| Hall | Bogan Shire | 31°05′54″S 147°02′04″E |
| Hermitage | Bogan Shire | 31°25′54″S 146°40′04″E |
| Kelley | Cobar Shire | 31°19′45″S 146°27′18″E |
| Kidgery | Bogan Shire | 31°25′54″S 147°02′04″E |
| King | Bogan Shire | 31°23′54″S 146°30′04″E |
| Langtree | Cobar Shire | 31°23′41″S 146°24′50″E |
| Lincoln | Bogan Shire | 31°15′54″S 146°44′04″E |
| Lynch | Bogan Shire | 31°27′54″S 147°08′04″E |
| Meeson | Bogan Shire | 31°12′05″S 146°33′21″E |
| Mepunga | Bogan Shire | 31°07′57″S 146°29′28″E |
| Merri | Bogan Shire | 31°11′59″S 146°40′01″E |
| Monkellan | Bogan Shire | 31°23′54″S 146°34′04″E |
| Mulga | Cobar Shire | 31°16′36″S 146°10′30″E |
| Muriel | Bogan Shire | 31°27′54″S 146°34′04″E |
| Narrama | Cobar Shire | 31°23′50″S 146°16′33″E |
| Neiley | Bogan Shire | 31°17′54″S 147°00′04″E |
| Nirranda | Bogan Shire | 31°27′54″S 146°52′04″E |
| Nullawarra | Cobar Shire | 31°18′55″S 146°16′05″E |
| Orion | Bogan Shire | 31°15′54″S 146°38′04″E |
| Quandong | Cobar Shire | 31°14′10″S 146°16′17″E |
| Sturt | Bogan Shire | 31°01′54″S 146°56′04″E |
| The Brothers | Bogan Shire | 31°09′54″S 146°44′04″E |
| The Pines | Bogan Shire | 31°07′54″S 146°54′04″E |
| Tootalally | Bogan Shire | 31°05′54″S 146°48′04″E |
| Tooram | Bogan Shire | 31°10′26″S 146°22′12″E |
| Tritton | Bogan Shire | 31°19′54″S 146°38′04″E |
| Vega | Bogan Shire | 31°00′51″S 146°39′39″E |
| Warong | Bogan Shire | 31°27′54″S 146°30′04″E |
| Warranbilla | Bogan Shire | 31°09′54″S 146°58′04″E |
| Warrego | Bogan Shire | 31°17′54″S 146°32′04″E |
| Warungo | Bogan Shire | 30°59′54″S 146°50′04″E |
| Waveney | Bogan Shire | 31°04′21″S 146°34′09″E |
| Wilgabone | Bogan Shire | 31°17′54″S 146°50′04″E |
| Willeroon | Bogan Shire | 31°01′54″S 147°02′04″E |
| Yarran | Bogan Shire | 31°06′39″S 146°19′09″E |
