= Ngiyampaa =

Aboriginal Australian people of New South Wales

The Ngiyampaa people, also spelt Ngyiyambaa, Nyammba and Ngemba, (Note: This version of the ethnonym represents a northern pronunciation, in which speakers tended to run iya together, producing a vocalisation close to English 'e'. (Beckett et al. 2003, p. 12)) are an Aboriginal Australian people of the state of New South Wales. The generic name refers to an aggregation of three groups, the Ngiyampaa, the Ngiyampaa Wangaaypuwan, and the Ngiyampaa Wayilwan, respectively clans of a larger Ngiyampaa nation.

== Language ==
Their language consisted of varieties of Ngiyampaa, (Note: The name of the language means 'talk-world' (Donaldson 1984, p. 23)) which was composed of two dialects, Ngiyambaa Wangaaypuwan and Wayilwan Ngiyambaa. The Wangaaypuwan (with wangaay) people are so called because they use wangaay to say "no", as opposed to the Ngiyampaa in the Macquarie Marshes and towards Walgett, who were historically defined separately by colonial ethnographers as Wayilwan, so-called because their word for "no" was wayil. The distinction between Ngiyampaa, Wangaaypuwan, and Wayilwan traditionally drawn, and sanctioned by the classification of Norman Tindale, may rest upon a flawed assumption of marked "tribal" differences based on Ngiyampaa linguistic discriminations between internal groups or clans whose word for "no" varied.

== Country ==
According to Tindale's estimation, Ngiyampaa tribal lands (ngurrampaa, "country") (Note: ngurra means 'camp' while the suffix paa indicates a world or place. (Donaldson 1984, p. 23)) extended over some 6,600 square miles (17,000 km^{2}) in the territory, much of it peneplain, lying south of the south bank of the Barwon and Darling rivers, from Brewarrina to Dunlop. Their area included Yanda Creek down to the source of Mulga Creek, and took in the Bogan River. The Wayilwan clan were on their southeastern flank, the Wangaaypuwan clan southwest while the Gamilaraay were to the northeast and the Paakantyi to their west and northwest.

Mount Grenfell, some 80 kilometres (50 mi) northwest of Cobar, is an important site for the Ngiyampaa people, who were barred from accessing it until the 1970s.

== Group classifications ==
A geographical distinction regarding the homeland camping world (ngurrampaa) is attested between three groups, all inhabiting areas devoid of permanent watercourses.

- (a) pilaarrkiyalu ('woodlanders'. Lit.'belar people') to the east.
- (b) nhiilyikiyalu (nilyah tree people) a westerly group who formerly camped northwest of the ngurrampaa, around Marfield station.

These two groups are collectively referred to as drylanders.

- (c)karulkiyalu or 'stone people', those associated with the stony terrain north of the Ngiyampaa's camping world.

A further distinction was drawn between the above three groups and two groups of river people whose descendants now dwell to the east and west of the ngurrampaa. These are the

- (d) kaliyarrkiyalu (people of the Lachlan River (kaliyarr), the Wiradjuri)
- (e) paawankay (people of the Darling River, the Paakantyi).

== History of contact ==
In 1914 a regional newspaper stated that there had been a massacre in 1859 of around 300 Ngiyampaa at Hospital Creek, close to Brewarrina.

== Some words ==
- ngurram-paa ('camp-world', therefore homeland)
- ngurrangkiyalu (housewife)
- purrpa (school for making men)
- waaway (Rainbow Serpent)
- wirringan (doctors or 'clever' people)

== Sources ==
- Beckett, Jeremy; Donaldson, Tamsin; Steadman, Bradley; Meredith, Steve (April 2003). Yapapunakirri Let's Track Back: The Aboriginal World Around Mount Grenfell. Office of the Registrar, Aboriginal Land Rights Act 1983 (NSW). ISBN 0-9581920-1-4..
- Dixon, R. M. W. (2002). Australian Languages: Their Nature and Development. Cambridge University Press. ISBN 978-0-521-47378-1.
- Donaldson, Tamsin (1984). "What's in a name? An etymological view of land, language and social identification from central western New South Wales" (PDF). Aboriginal History. 8 (1): 21–44.
- Donaldson, Tamsin (1985). "From Speaking Ngiyampa to Speaking English". Aboriginal History. 9 (1–2): 126–147. JSTOR 24045833.
- Tindale, Norman Barnett (1974). "Ngemba (NSW)". Aboriginal Tribes of Australia: Their Terrain, Environmental Controls, Distribution, Limits, and Proper Names. Australian National University.
