= Gunningbar Creek =

Gunningbar Creek is a waterway in Central West New South Wales. It is part of a regulated system Gunningbar Creek is an important tributary of the Bogan River.
