= Orana (New South Wales) =

- Region
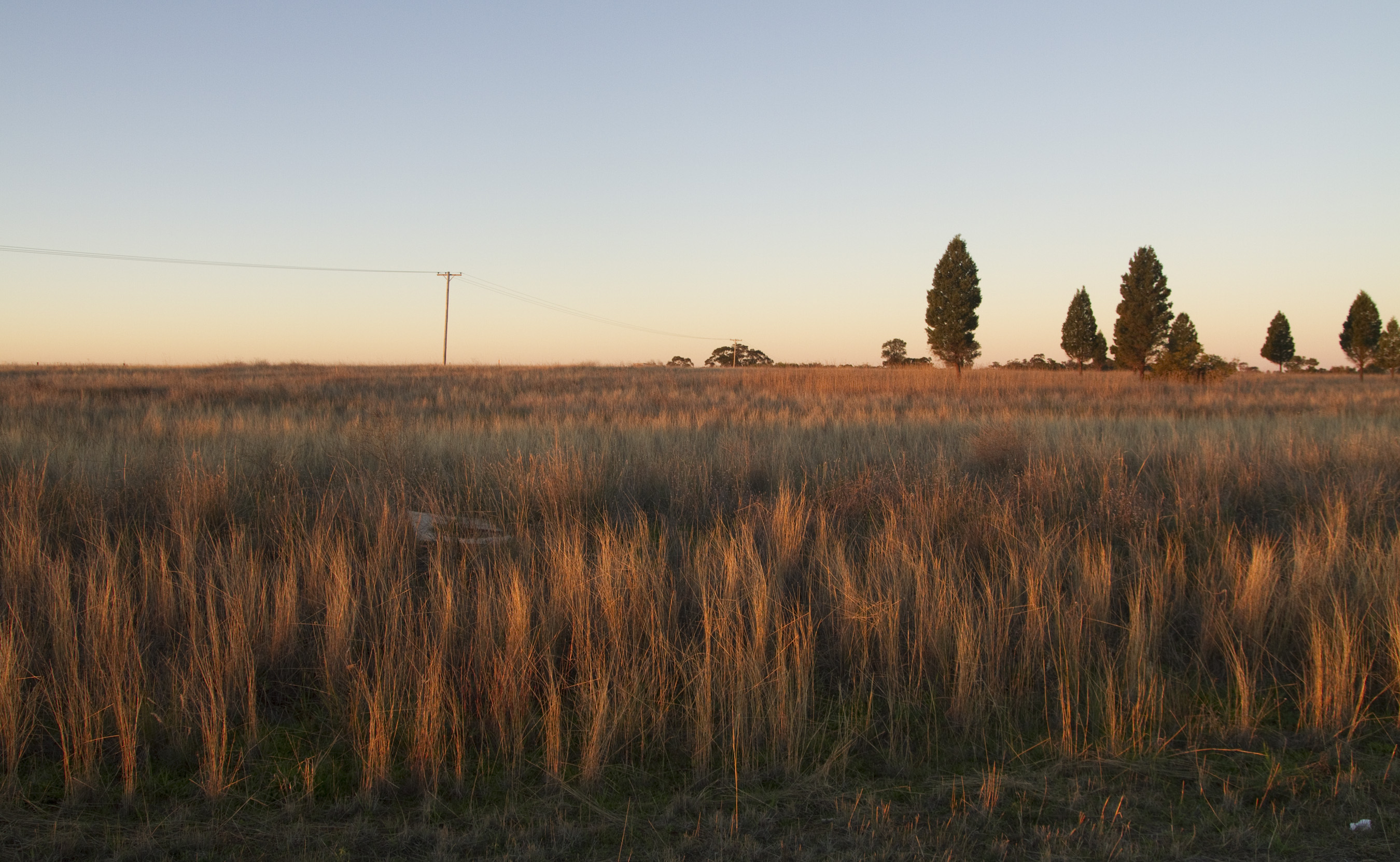
- Looking over farms at the edge of Dubbo

- Coordinates: 31°20′S 148°10′E
- Country: Australia
- State: New South Wales
- LGA: Bogan Shire; Bourke Shire; Brewarrina Shire; Cobar Shire; Coonamble Shire; Dubbo Regional Council; Gilgandra Shire; Narromine Shire; Walgett Shire; Warren Shire; Warrumbungle Shire

Government
  - State electorates: Barwon; Dubbo
  - Federal divisions: Calare; Parkes

Area
  - Total: 192,581 km^{2} (74,356 sq mi)

Population
  - Total: 122,897 (2021)
  - Density: 0.638157/km^{2} (1.652820/sq mi)
- Time zone: UTC+10 (AEST)
  - Summer (DST): AEDT
Regions around Orana
Far West	North West Slopes	North West Slopes
Far West	Orana	Central West
Far West	Riverina	South West Slopes

Orana is a vast region in north-central New South Wales, Australia. As of June 2015 it had an estimated population of 113,824 people. It has an area of 198,561 square kilometres (76,665 sq mi) and is the largest region in New South Wales, comprising approximately 25% of that state. The major localities include Dubbo and Cobar. This region corresponds approximately with the Australian Bureau of Statistics' North Western Statistical Division.

== Geography ==
Mount Exmouth (1,206 metres) located within the Warrumbungle National Park is the tallest mountain peak located within the Orana region.

== Etymology ==
The term 'Orana' is said to mean "welcome" in an Aboriginal language, perhaps that of the local Wiradjuri group. Orana was popularised as an Australian Aboriginal word in the carol Orana to Christmas Day, released in 1948, though its true origins are obscure. Linguist David Nash suggests that Orana's true origin may be a Polynesian language, noting that Kia orāna is a common greeting on Rarotonga, the largest of the Cook Islands and Ia Orana in Tahitian means "hello". He says the word was first ascribed as Aboriginal in the 1920s and specifically Wiradjuri only from the 1970s, and does not fit the usual form of Wiradjuri words.

== Economy ==
Agriculture is the predominant industry in the Orana region, with 86% of the area under agricultural land use. This land makes up 27% of the total agricultural land in New South Wales. The output equals approximately A$658 million or 11.7% of the state's agricultural production. Agriculture industry jobs provide over 20 percent of the employment in the region. Wine made from the small number of vineyards in the Orana region may be labelled as Western Plains.

== Transport ==
Orana is served by NSW TrainLink rail and coach services, including the Central West Express running between Sydney and Dubbo.

Dubbo Airport is the region's main airport with smaller regional airports including Bourke Airport and Cobar Airport.

== Media ==
Radio stations that broadcast to the region are:

- ABC Western Plains serving Dubbo and part of the region (part of ABC Local Radio)
- ABC Central West can also be received in some parts of the region (part of ABC Local Radio)
- Triple M (commercial)
- 2WEB serving Bourke and surrounding areas (community)
- 2DU serving Dubbo (community)

The region is served by five television stations. In common with all Australian TV stations, they now broadcast digital transmissions only, with the primary program in each case being designated as:

- QQQ, 7two, 7mate – Seven Network owned and operated channels.
- CDT, 10 Drama, 10 Comedy – an affiliate of Network 10.
- Imparja, 9Go!, 9Gem – an affiliate of the Nine Network.
- ABC TV – ABC, ABC Family, ABC Kids, ABC Entertains, ABC News
- SBS Television – SBS, SBS Viceland, SBS World Movies, SBS WorldWatch, SBS Food, NITV

Seven (formerly branded as Prime7 and Prime Television) and WIN Television both produce half-hour-long local news bulletins. Seven News (formerly Prime7 News and Prime News) screens at 6 pm, while WIN News screens at 5:30 pm from Monday to Friday. Nine News Central West was an hour-long bulletin that mixed local and national news, broadcast on the Southern Cross Austereo primary channel, when it was a Nine affiliate.

== See also ==
- Regions of New South Wales
- Western Plains wine zone
- Taronga Western Plains Zoo
