= Nymagee =

- Town
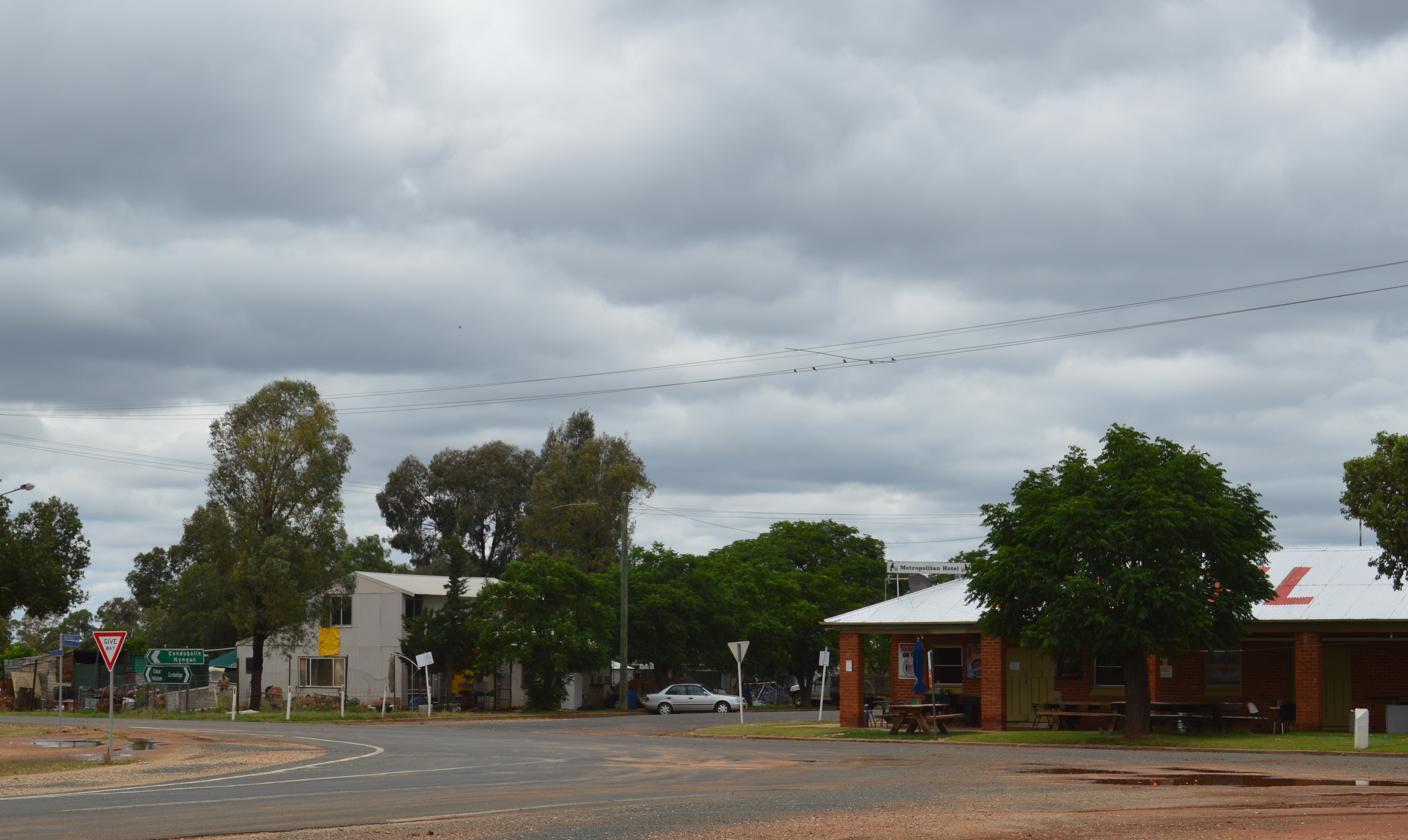
- Nymagee, with the Metropolitan Hotel on the right

- Coordinates: 32°07′S 146°32′E
- Country: Australia
- State: New South Wales
- LGA: Cobar Shire Council
- Location: 618 km (384 mi) from Sydney

Government
  - State electorate: Barwon
  - Federal division: Parkes
- Elevation: 260 m (850 ft)

Population
  - Total: 100 (2016 census)
- Postcode: 2831

Nymagee is a small town in the north west of New South Wales, 618 kilometres (384 mi) north west of Sydney, 130 kilometres (81 mi) south west of Nyngan and 89 kilometres (55 mi) south of Cobar. It is in the Shire of Cobar, The State Government area of Barwon and the Federal Government area of Parkes. At the 2016 census, Nymagee had a population of 101.

An area, COP4, of 2,070,061 hectares (5,115,230 acres) around Nymagee has also been designated as an IBRA biogeographic subregion of the Cobar Peneplain biogeographic region.

== History ==
Nymagee was originally a copper mining town and in its peak supported a population of over 2200, half of those being Chinese migrants. However, when the mine closed in 1917, most of the residents left. By 1949, the inhabitants were thinking of Nymagee as a 'ghost town', even though it still possessed a hall, racecourse and social and sports clubs.

Nymagee had a market garden cultivated by Tong Mow, for 38 years, until ill health forced him to stop in 1920.

In 1999 local residents started an outback music festival to increase tourism and residents in the town. The first festival was visited by 600 tourists and the festival has since increased Nymagee's tourism by 60% and significantly increased the number of permanent residents

Nymagee is also home to the fictional character "Clancy" from the poem "Clancy of the Overflow", written by the famous bush poet Banjo Paterson. The sheep station "The Overflow" featured in the poem is situated about 32 kilometres (20 mi) south east of Nymagee.

== Mining approval ==
In March 2023, approval was obtained for a mine just outside Nymagee.
