= Wangaaypuwan =

Aboriginal Australian people of New South Wales

Wongaibon
Total population
- possibly under 100 (less than 1% of the Australian population, less than 1% of the Aboriginal population)

Regions with significant populations
- Australia (New South Wales)

Languages
- English

Religion
- Aboriginal mythology

The Wangaaypuwan, also known as the Wongaibon or Ngiyampaa Wangaaypuwan, are an Aboriginal Australian people who traditionally lived between Nyngan, the headwaters of Bogan Creek, and on Tigers Camp and Boggy Cowal creeks and west to Ivanhoe, New South Wales. They are a clan of the Ngiyampaa nation.

== Ethnonym ==
The tribal ethnonym derives from their word for "no", variously transcribed worjai, wonghi or wangaay.

== Language ==
They spoke a distinct dialect of the Ngiyambaa language. The last known speaker was a woman called "Old Nanny", from whom a list of sixty words was collected. She died sometime around 1914.

Like other Ngiyampaa people such as the Wayilwan, they also referred to themselves according to their home country.

== Country ==
According to anthropologist Norman Tindale, the Wangaaypuwans' traditional lands extended over some 27,000 square miles (70,000 km^{2}) of territory, taking in the headwaters of the Bogan River, the Tiger's Camp and Boggy Cowal creeks. Their area encompassed Trida, Narromine, Nyngan, Girilambone, Cobar, and Gilgunnia. The western boundary lay around Ivanhoe and near the Neckarboo Range. Their southern borders ran to Trundle. When severe drought struck they were known to venture into Wiradjuri land, to their west, on the Lachlan River and Little Billabong Creek.

== Social organisation ==
According to an early observer, A. L. P. Cameron, the Wangaaypuwans' social divisions were as follows:

Classes	Totems
Ipai	wagun (crow)
Kumbu	murua (kangaroo)
Murri	tali (iguana)
Kubbi	kuru (bandicoot); kurakai (opossum)

The Wangaaypuwan intermarried with the Wiradjuri, and the marriage pattern, again according to Cameron, was as follows:

Male	Marries	Children are
(M) Ipai	(F) Matha	Murri/Matha
(M) Kumbu	(F) Kubbitha	Kubbi/Kubbitha
(M) Murri	(F) Ipatha	Ipai/Ipatha
(M) Kubbi	(F) Butha	Kumbu/Butha

Cameron elsewhere states that Ipatha, Butha, Matha and Kubbitha were the female equivalents of Ipai, Kumbu, Murri and Kubbi.

There were five grades classified for the ages of man: a boy was eramurrung, bimbadjeri during the initiatory months, then bigumjeri. On reaching middle age, he became gibera and in old age giribung.

== Lore ==
According to a Wangaaypuwan story, the emu once had enormous wings, and, flying high, grew curious at the sight of numerous birds engaged in fishing in a lake. On its descent, the other species flew off in alarm, save for the brolga or native companion. The emu inquired about how it might learn the craft of fishing, and the brolga, with treacherous mischief in mind, told it that to trawl up fish, it would have to have its immense wings removed which, on the emu consenting, the native companion set about doing, and, once the shearing was completed, scorned the emu, which was now deprived of flight. On meeting up again after many years, it turned out the emu had a brood of ten chicks, while the brolga had only one. The brolga apologized for her bad behaviour and was forgiven. But, unable to change her malicious ways, she jumped at the excuse provided by the emu's admission it was hard to feed her nurslings, by suggesting they eat them.

Once more the emu was inveigled into accepting the brolga's advice, only, once the latter had gorged itself, to be cajoled for its stupidity in having its young killed. On a third occasion, the brolga, seeing the emu on a brood of 10 eggs, tried to get them, but was fended off as the emu rushed off the nest and charged the native companion. It in turn, leapt at the opportunity to smash the eggs by dropping down from the sky. Only one remained intact. The outraged emu, finding nothing to throw at her antagonist, took this last egg and launched it after the brolga as it flew high into the sky. It hit its target, and, as it broke, formed the sun.

== Alternative names and spellings ==
- Mudall
- Wongai-bun
- Wonghi
- Wonghibon
- Wonghibone
- Wonghibone
- Wongi-boner
- Wo'yaibun (typo)
- Wungai
- Wuzai/Wozai (z = substitute for the ng ( ŋ) symbol by Ridley)

== Some words ==
Source: Wangaaypuwan dictionary

- paapaa (father)
- kunii (mother)
- purraay (child)
- palkaa (boomerang)
- mirri (tame dog)
- wampuy (rock kangaroo)
- winarr (woman, wife)
- thurrkala (initiated man)
- mayi (Aboriginal person)
- walmarra (medicine man)
- ngaawaa (yes)
- wangaay (no, not)

== Sources ==
- Balfe, J. (1887). "Bogan River" (PDF). In Curr, Edward Micklethwaite (ed.). The Australian race: its origin, languages, customs, place of landing in Australia and the routes by which it spread itself over the continent. Vol. 3. Melbourne: J. Ferres. pp. 380–381.
- Cameron, A. L. P. (1885). "Notes on some tribes of New South Wales". The Journal of the Anthropological Institute of Great Britain and Ireland. 14: 344–370. doi:10.2307/2841627. JSTOR 2841627.
- Cameron, A. L. P. (21 November 1899). "Aboriginal names of places". Science of Man. 2 (10): 195.
- Cameron, A. L. P. (23 April 1900). "Aboriginal words with meanings used by the Wonjhibon tribe". Science of Man. 3 (3): 46–47.
- Cameron, A. L. P. (23 June 1902a). "Marriage law as practised by the Wonghibone tribe". Science of Man. 5 (5): 83–84.
- Cameron, A. L. P. (27 December 1902b). "Marriage laws of the aboriginal tribes of N.S.W." Science of Man. 5 (11): 176–179.
- Cameron, A. L. P. (22 April 1903). "Traditions and folklore of the aborigines of New South Wales". Science of Man. 6 (3): 46–48.
- "Cobar Peneplain - regional history Aboriginal occupation". Office of Environment & Heritage, NSW Government. 2011.
- Donaldson, Tamsin (1984). "What's in a name? An etymological view of land, language and social identification from central western New South Wales" (PDF). Aboriginal History. 8 (1): 21–44.
- Magistrates (1887). "Sources of Bogan River" (PDF). In Curr, Edward Micklethwaite (ed.). The Australian race: its origin, languages, customs, place of landing in Australia and the routes by which it spread itself over the continent. Vol. 3. Melbourne: J. Ferres. pp. 382–383.
- Ridley, William (1873). "Report on Australian languages and traditions". The Journal of the Anthropological Institute of Great Britain and Ireland. 2: 257–291. doi:10.2307/2841174. JSTOR 2841174.
- Ridley, William (1875). Kámilarói, and other Australian languages (PDF). Sydney: T. Richards, government printer.
- Smart, J.; Creaser, P.; Monaghan, D. (2000). Linking Conservation Assessment and Aboriginal Ecological Knowledge on the Cobar Peneplain. NPWS.
- Tindale, Norman Barnett (1974). "Wongaibon (NSW)". Aboriginal Tribes of Australia: Their Terrain, Environmental Controls, Distribution, Limits, and Proper Names. Australian National University Press. ISBN 978-0-708-10741-6. Archived from the original on 7 March 2016.
- "Wangaibon". Countries and their Cultures.
- Woods, J. D. (1879). The Native Tribes of South Australia. Adelaide: E. S. Wigg & Son.
