= Ngiyampaa language =

Critically endangered Pama–Nyungan language of New South Wales, Australia

Ngiyampaa/Ngiyambaa
- Native to: Australia
- Region: New South Wales
- Ethnicity: Ngiyambaa (Wangaaypuwan, Wayilwan)
- Native speakers: 11-50 (2018-2019)
- Language family: Pama–Nyungan: Wiradhuric; Ngiyampaa/Ngiyambaa
- Dialects: Wangaaybuwan; Wayilwan (Wailwan)

Language codes
- ISO 639-3: wyb
- Glottolog: wang1291
- AIATSIS: D22 Ngiyampaa / Ngempa, D20 Wayilwan, D18 Wangaaypuwan
- ELP: Ngiyambaa
- Ngiyambaa is classified as Critically Endangered by the UNESCO Atlas of the World's Languages in Danger.

The Ngiyampaa language, also spelt Ngiyambaa, Ngempa, Ngemba and other variants, is a Pama–Nyungan language of the Wiradhuric subgroup. It was the traditional language of the Wangaaypuwan and Wayilwan peoples of New South Wales.

== Speakers and status ==
Ngiyampaa was the traditional language of the Wangaaypuwan and Wayilwan peoples of New South Wales, Australia, but is now moribund.

According to Tamsin Donaldson (1980) there are two dialects of Ngiyampaa: Wangaaybuwan, spoken by the people in the south, and Wayil or Wayilwan, spoken by people in the north. They have very similar grammars.

Donaldson records that by the 1970s there were only about ten people fluent in Wangaaypuwan, and only a couple of Wayilwan speakers left. In 2018–2019, it was estimated by one source that there were 11–50 speakers of the Ngiyambaa language.

== Names ==
Ngiyambaa (meaning language), or Ngiyambaambuwali, was also used by the Wangaaypuwan and Wayilwan to describe themselves, whilst 'Wangaaypuwan' and 'Wayilwan' (meaning 'With Wangaay/Wayil' (for 'no') were used to distinguish both the language and the speakers from others who did not have wangaay or wayil for no.

Other names for Ngiyambaa are: Giamba, Narran, Noongaburrah, Ngampah, Ngemba, Ngeumba, Ngiamba, Ngjamba, Ngiyampaa and Ngumbarr; Wangaibon is also called Wangaaybuwan and Wongaibon, and Weilwan is also called Wailwan, Wayilwan, or Wailwun.

Their language consisted of varieties of Ngiyampaa, (Note: The name of the language means 'talk-world' (Donaldson 1984, p. 23)) which was composed of two dialects, Ngiyampaa Wangaaypuwan and Ngiyambaa Wayilwan. The Wangaaypuwan (with wangaay) people are so called because they use wangaay to say "no", as opposed to the Ngiyampaa in the Macquarie Marshes and towards Walgett, who were historically defined separately by colonial ethnographers as Wayilwan, so-called because their word for "no" was wayil. The distinction between Ngiyampaa, Wangaaypuwan, and Wayilwan traditionally drawn, and sanctioned by the classification of Norman Tindale, may rest upon a flawed assumption of marked "tribal" differences based on Ngiyampaa linguistic discriminations between internal groups or clans whose word for "no" varied.

== Phonology ==
=== Consonants ===
	Peripheral		Laminal		Apical	
	Labial	Velar	Dental	Palatal	Alveolar	Retroflex
Plosive	b ⟨b/p⟩	ɡ ⟨g/k⟩	d̪ ⟨dh/th⟩	ɟ ⟨dy/ty⟩	d ⟨d/t⟩	
Nasal	m ⟨m⟩	ŋ ⟨ng⟩	n̪ ⟨nh⟩	ɲ ⟨ny⟩	n ⟨n⟩	
Lateral					l ⟨l⟩	
Rhotic					r ⟨rr⟩	
Approximant	w ⟨w⟩			j ⟨y⟩		ɻ ⟨r⟩

Wangaaypuwan orthography uses p, t, k while Wayilwan uses b, d, g.

=== Vowels ===
	Front	Central	Back
Close	i ⟨i⟩ iː ⟨ii⟩		u ⟨u⟩ uː ⟨uu⟩
Open		a ⟨a⟩ aː ⟨aa⟩	

Phonemes	Allophones
/i/, /iː/	[i], [ɪ], [iː], [ɪː]
/a/	[ä], [ə], [ʌ], [e], [ɛ], [o], [ɔ]
/u/, /uː/	[u], [ʊ], [o], [uː], [ʊː], [oː]

== Sources ==
- Beckett, Jeremy; Donaldson, Tamsin; Steadman, Bradley; Meredith, Steve (April 2003). Yapapunakirri Let's Track Back: The Aboriginal World Around Mount Grenfell. Office of the Registrar, Aboriginal Land Rights Act 1983 (NSW). ISBN 0-9581920-1-4..
- Dixon, R. M. W. (2002). Australian Languages: Their Nature and Development. Cambridge University Press. ISBN 978-0-521-47378-1.
- Donaldson, Tamsin (1980). Ngiyambaa: The language of the Wangaaybuwan. Cambridge University Press. ISBN 0-521-22524-8. ISSN 0068-676X.
- Donaldson, Tamsin (1984). "What's in a name? An etymological view of land, language and social identification from central western New South Wales" (PDF). Aboriginal History. 8 (1): 21–44.
- Donaldson, Tamsin (1985). "From Speaking Ngiyampa to Speaking English". Aboriginal History. 9 (1–2): 126–147. JSTOR 24045833.
- Tindale, Norman Barnett (1974). "Ngemba (NSW)". Aboriginal Tribes of Australia: Their Terrain, Environmental Controls, Distribution, Limits, and Proper Names. Australian National University.
