= Bogan River =

River in Australia

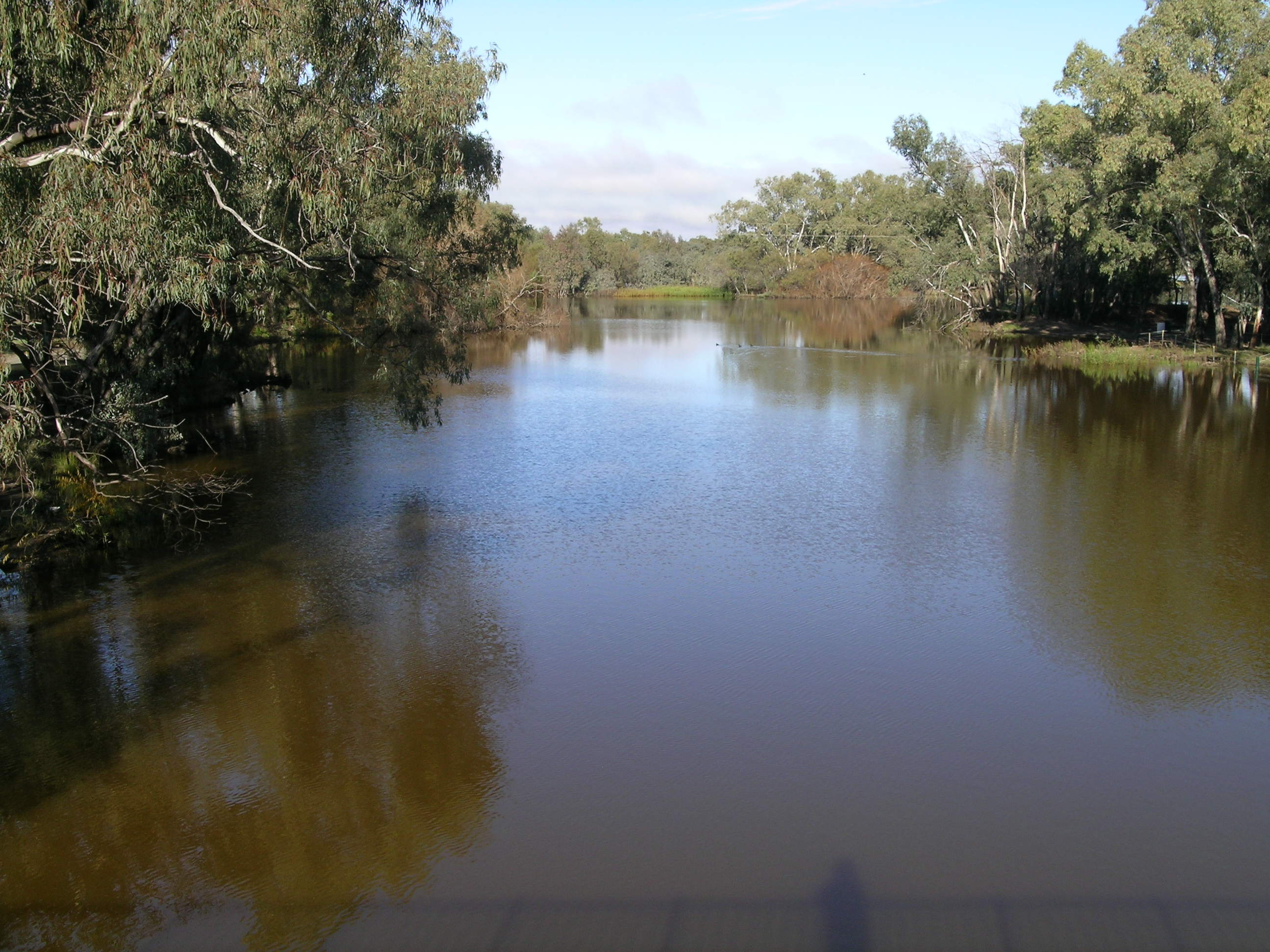
- The Bogan River at Nyngan

- Location of the Bogan River mouth in New South Wales
- Etymology: 1. Aboriginal: the birthplace of a notable headman of the local tribe;

Location
- Country: Australia
- State: New South Wales
- Region: Central West, Orana

Physical characteristics
- Source: Little River (Parkes)
  - location: Cooks Myalls, near Parkes
  - coordinates: 33°00′30″S 148°02′00″E
  - elevation: 305 m (1,001 ft)
- Mouth: Darling River
  - location: Barwon River, near Bourke
  - coordinates: 29°57′38″S 146°20′07″E
  - elevation: 111 m (364 ft)
- Length: 617 km (383 mi)
- Basin size: 18,000 km^{2} (6,900 sq mi)

Basin features
- River system: Macquarie–Barwon sub-catchment, Darling River catchment, Murray-Darling basin
- Tributaries
  - left: Genaren Creek, Sandy Creek, Bulbodney Creek, Little Bogan River
  - right: Cookopie Creek, Burrill Creek, Gundong Creek, Tomingley Creek, Mulla Mulla Cowal, Moonagee Cowal, Gunningbar Creek, Nyangi Bogan Cowal, Duck Creek, Bywash Billabong, Kellys Cowal
- Basin area is upstream of Nyngan only

Bogan River, a perennial river that is part of the Macquarie–Barwon catchment within the Murray–Darling basin, is located in the central west and Orana regions of New South Wales, Australia.

From its origin near Parkes, the Bogan River flows for about 617 kilometres (383 mi) in length and flows into the Barwon River between Brewarrina and Bourke.

The name Bogan is supposedly an Australian Aboriginal (Wiradjuri or Ngiyambaa) term meaning 'the birthplace of a notable headman of the local tribe'; this may be in reference to the Wiradjuri people of the Bulgandramine Aboriginal Mission, whose word for "leader" is “Balgabalgar”. The word is also a Gaelic term meaning bog.

== Geography ==
From the foothills of the Herveys Range, the Bogan River rises to the west of the headwaters of the Little River at Cooks Myalls, near Goonumbla, 19 kilometres (12 mi) north-west of Parkes. The river flows in a generally north-north-westerly direction past Tottenham, Peak Hill and through Nyngan. East of Bourke, the Bogan River joins with the Little Bogan River to form the Darling River. The Bogan River has over twenty tributaries. The main tributaries to the west are Bullock, Bulbodney, Pangee and Whitbarrow Creeks. The eastern catchment between the Bogan and Macquarie Rivers is ill-defined and has only one major tributary, Mulla Cowal. Other sources have claimed that Bugwah Cowal, and Burrill, Duck and Gunningbar Creeks are important tributaries.

Unlike the other main rivers of inland New South Wales, the Bogan does not rise in the well-watered highland areas, so its flow is low and erratic and not much use for irrigation.

Major weirs along the watercourse are at Muddal Weir, located west of Peak Hill; the Nyngan Weir, located north of Nyngan; and Gongolgon Weir, where the mean daily flow exceeds 700 megalitres (25×10^{6} cu ft).

The Kamilaroi Highway crosses the Bogan River 43 kilometres (27 mi) east of Bourke.

== History ==
=== Aboriginal history ===
A number of Aboriginal peoples lived in the lands surrounding the Bogan River for many thousands of years. In the area surrounding Peak Hill, the indigenous inhabitants of the area were the Wiradjuri clan. In the area surrounding Nyngan, the Ngiyambaa Aboriginal people were the principal custodians of the land.

=== Late modern history ===
The river was crossed by John Oxley in 1817, but was named by Charles Sturt in his 1828-9 expedition as New Years Creek on 1 January 1829. It was also called the Bogan River prior to Major Sir Thomas Mitchell reaching here in 1835.

The Albert Priest Channel was built in 1941 and this assists the water supplies of Nyngan and Cobar with Macquarie River water. It is about 60 km long, extending from Gunningbar Creek near Warren to the Bogan River upstream of Nyngan. A pipeline takes water from Nyngan to Cobar.

In April 1990, major flooding occurred along the river and in Nyngan, and despite a massive effort by local people to build levee walls using sandbags, 2,500 people had to be evacuated from the town. The floods caused A$50 million damage. Other significant flooding of the Bogan River occurred in 1928, 1950, 1989 and other years. In 1989 the significant flooding was downstream of Nyngan. https://trove.nla.gov.au/newspaper/article/63179773

== See also ==
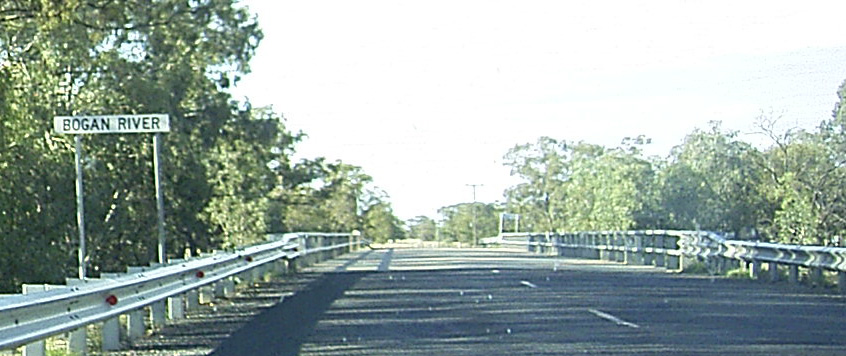
A crossing of the Bogan River on the Dandaloo-Trangie Road, pictured in 2009.

- Rivers of New South Wales
