= Bogan Shire =

- Local government area
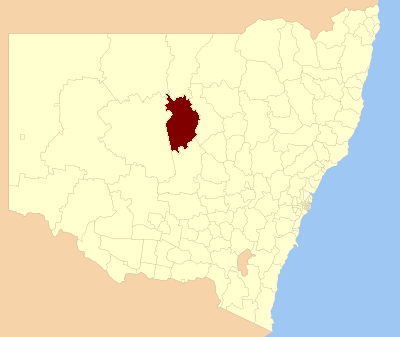
- Location in New South Wales

- Interactive map of Bogan Shire
- Coordinates: 31°34′S 147°12′E
- Country: Australia
- State: New South Wales
- Region: Orana
- Established: 7 May 1906.
- Council seat: Nyngan

Government
  - Mayor: Glen Neill (Unaligned)
  - State electorate: Barwon
  - Federal division: Parkes

Area
  - Total: 14,611 km^{2} (5,641 sq mi)

Population
  - Totals: 2,692 (2016 census); 2,621 (2018 est.)
  - Density: 0.21/km^{2} (0.54/sq mi)
- Website: Bogan Shire
LGAs around Bogan Shire
Bourke	Brewarrina	Warren
Cobar	Bogan Shire	Warren
Cobar	Lachlan	Lachlan

Bogan Shire is a local government area in the Orana region of New South Wales, Australia. The Shire is located adjacent to the Mitchell and Barrier highways and its only significant town is Nyngan.

The Municipality of Nyngan was proclaimed on 17 February 1891 with Nyngan having a population of 1,355. Bogan Shire was proclaimed on 7 May 1906. Bogan Shire absorbed the Municipality of Nyngan on 1 January 1972.

The mayor of Bogan Shire Council is Glen Neill, who is unaligned with any political party.

== Demographics ==
Selected historical census data for Bogan Shire local government area
Census year		2001	2006	2011	2016	2021
Population	Estimated residents on census night	3,083	▼2,883	▲2,900	▼2,692	▼2,467
Population	LGA rank in terms of size within New South Wales			122nd	▼125th	125th
Population	% of New South Wales population	0.05%	▼0.04%	0.04%	0.04%	▼0.03%
Population	% of Australian population	0.02%	▼0.01%	0.01%	0.01%	0.01%
Cultural and language diversity						
Ancestry, top responses	Australian			39.3%	▼39.1%	▲47.0%
Ancestry, top responses	English			30.6%	▼28.7%	▲37.1%
Ancestry, top responses	Australian Aboriginal			n/c	n/c	▲16.3%
Ancestry, top responses	Irish			10.3%	▼9.1%	▲11.3%
Ancestry, top responses	Scottish			5.4%	▲5.6%	▲6.9%
Language, top responses (other than English)	Gujarati	n/c	n/c	n/c	n/c	▲0.6%
Language, top responses (other than English)	Nepali	n/c	n/c	▲0.2%	▼ n/c	▲0.4%
Language, top responses (other than English)	Fijian	n/c	n/c	n/c	n/c	▲0.4%
Language, top responses (other than English)	Shona	n/c	n/c	n/c	n/c	▲0.3%
Language, top responses (other than English)	Lao	n/c	n/c	n/c	n/c	▲0.2%
Religious affiliation						
Religious affiliation, top responses	Catholic	37.1%	▲37.7%	▼36.6%	▼34.9%	▼31.3%
Religious affiliation, top responses	No Religion	4.4%	▲6.8%	▲7.4%	▲11.5%	▲24.8%
Religious affiliation, top responses	Anglican	33.9%	▼32.6%	▼29.6%	▼25.3%	▼21.9%
Religious affiliation, top responses	Not Stated	n/c	n/c	n/c	▲12.1%	▼8.3%
Religious affiliation, top responses	Uniting Church	11.9%	▼10.3%	▼9.6%	▼8.6%	▼6.3%
Median weekly incomes						
Personal income	Median weekly personal income		A$365	A$478	A$634	A$774
Personal income	% of Australian median income		78.3%	▲82.8%	▲95.8%	▲96.1%
Family income	Median weekly family income		A$944	A$1,182	A$1,561	A$1,931
Family income	% of Australian median income		80.6%	▼79.8%	▲90.0%	▲91.1%
Household income	Median weekly household income		A$708	A$902	A$1,155	A$1,444
Household income	% of Australian median income		68.9%	▲73.1%	▲80.3%	▲82.7%

=== Incomes ===
According to the Australian Bureau of Statistics during 2003–04 there:

- were 798 wage and salary earners (ranked 151st in New South Wales and 484th in Australia, less than 0.1% of both New South Wales's 2,558,415 and Australia's 7,831,856)
- was a total income of $26 million (ranked 150th in New South Wales and 484th in Australia, less than 0.1% of both New South Wales's $107 billion and Australia's $304 billion)
- was an estimated average income per wage and salary earner of $32,823 (ranked 99th in New South Wales and 338th in Australia, 79% of New South Wales's $41,407 and 85% of Australia's $38,820)
- was an estimated median income per wage and salary earner of $29,413 (ranked 111th in New South Wales and 388th in Australia, 83% of New South Wales's $35,479 and 86% of Australia's $34,149).

== Council ==
=== Current composition and election method ===
Bogan Shire Council is composed of nine councillors elected proportionally as a single ward. All councillors are elected for a fixed four-year term of office. The mayor is elected by the councillors at the first meeting of the council. The most recent election was held on 4 December 2021, and the makeup of the council is as follows:

Party	Councillors
Independents and Unaligned	9
Total	9

The current Council, elected in 2021, in order of election, is:

Councillor	Party	Notes
Victoria Boag	Independent	Deputy Mayor
Graham Jackson	Unaligned	
Glen Neill	Unaligned	Mayor
Karl Bright	Independent	
Jodi Douglas	Independent	
Tony Elias	Unaligned	
Greg Deacon	Unaligned	
Richard Milligan	Unaligned	
Douglas Menzies	Unaligned	

== Election results ==
=== 2024 ===
2024 New South Wales local elections: Bogan
Party	Candidate	Votes	%	±%
Independent	Glen Neill (elected)	523	35.0	+12.1
Independent	Karl Bright (elected)	167	11.2	−3.5
Independent	Emily Stanton (elected)	130	8.7	+8.7
Independent	Graham Jackson (elected)	121	8.1	−3.5
Independent	Douglas Menzies (elected)	114	7.6	+1.0
Independent	Victoria Boag (elected)	111	7.4	−3.2
Independent	Sam Issa (elected)	110	7.4	+7.4
Independent	Richard Bootle (elected)	85	5.7	+5.7
Independent	Richard Milligan	76	5.1	−1.7
Independent	Judy Elias (elected)	58	3.9	+3.9
Total formal votes		1,495	96.6	
Informal votes		53	3.4	
Turnout		1,548	80.0	

=== 2021 ===
2021 New South Wales local elections: Bogan
Party	Candidate	Votes	%	±%
Independent	Glen Neill (elected)	336	22.9	
Independent	Karl Bright (elected)	216	14.7	
Independent	Graham Jackson (elected)	200	13.6	
Independent	Victoria Boag (elected)	155	10.6	
Independent	Jodi Douglas (elected)	116	7.9	
Independent	Richard Milligan (elected)	99	6.7	
Independent	Douglas Menzies (elected)	97	6.6	
Independent	Michael Hoare	66	4.5	
Independent	Greg Deacon (elected)	65	4.4	
Independent	Veneta Dutton	59	4.0	
Independent	Tony Elias (elected)	58	4.0	
Total formal votes		1,467	97.5	
Informal votes		38	2.5	
Turnout		1,505	78.4	

== Meteorology ==
Bogan Shire is supported by agricultural production, grazing of sheep and cattle and cropping, primarily wheat. The area averages about 17 inches (430 mm) per year. However, there is great variability in the rainfall. In 1888 Nyngan had only 7.5 inches (190 mm) recorded, while in 1950 it had nearly 45 inches (1,100 mm).
