= Nevertire railway station =

Former railway station in New South Wales, Australia

Nevertire

General information
- Location: Trangie Street, Nevertire; New South Wales; Australia
- Coordinates: 31.8381°S 147.7161°E
- Lines: Main Western; Warren
- Distance: 563.700 km (350.267 mi) from Central
- Platforms: 1 (1 side)
- Tracks: 3

Construction
- Structure type: Ground

Other information
- Status: Demolished

History
- Opened: 1 May 1883 (143 years ago)

Services
Preceding station	Former services	Following station
Mullengudgery towards Bourke	Main Western Line	Trangie towards Sydney
Egelabra towards Warren	Warren Line	Terminus
Location

Nevertire railway station was a regional railway station located on the Main Western line, serving the Orana town of Nevertire.

== History ==
Nevertire station opened in May 1883 but is now closed to passenger services. A large wheat loading facility and silo and the junction of the Warren railway line are located at Nevertire.
