= Lawson Parish (Oxley County), New South Wales =

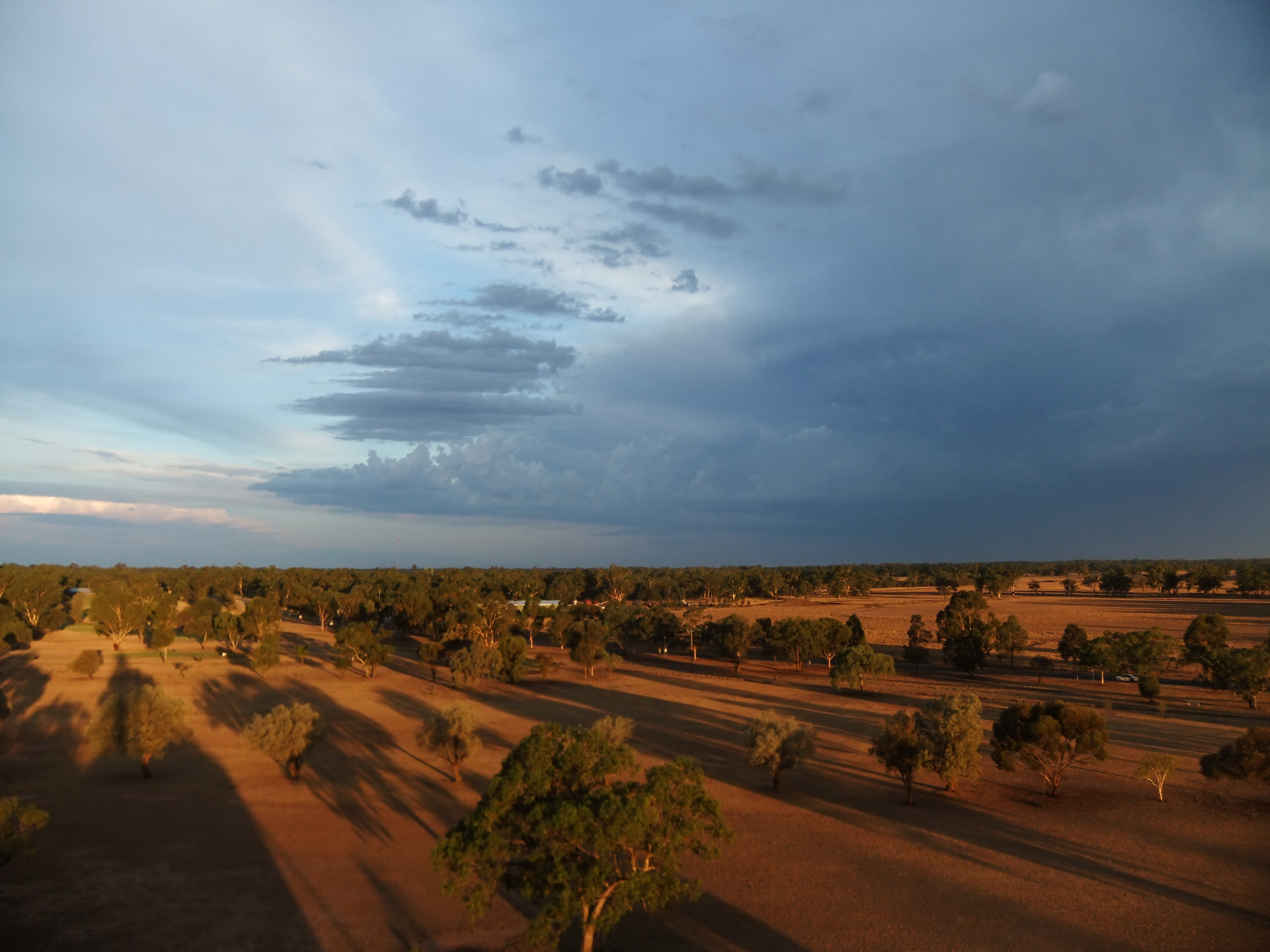
Lawson Parish Warren NSW, coming from Nevertire.

Lawson Parish is a rural locality of Warren Shire.

Lawson Parish is also a civil parish of Oxley County, New South Wales, a Cadastral divisions of New South Wales. The parish is on the Macquarie River east, outside of Warren, New South Wales.

Lawson, Parish is located at 31°43′54″S 147°46′04″e between Nevertire, New South Wales and Warren, New South Wales. The economy of the parish is based on broad acre agriculture, mainly sheep, cattle, cotton and wheat.

== History ==
Before European settlement the area is said to have been occupied by the Ngiyambaa Aborigines. Explorer John Oxley camped near the present site of Warren during his investigation of the Macquarie River in 1818. He noted an abundance of kangaroos and emus. Charles Sturt carried out further exploration in 1828–29.

== Geography ==
The topography is flat with a Köppen climate classification of BsK (Hot semi arid).

== See also ==
- Snakes Plain, New South Wales
