= Marthaguy Shire =

Former local government area in New South Wales, Australia

Marthaguy Shire New South Wales
- Established: 7 March 1906
- Abolished: 1 January 1957
- Council seat: Warren
- Region: Orana

Marthaguy Shire was a local government area in the Orana region of New South Wales, Australia.

Marthaguy Shire was proclaimed on 7 March 1906, one of 134 shires created after the passing of the Local Government (Shires) Act 1905.

The shire office was in Warren. Towns and villages in the shire included Collie and Nevertire.

Marthaguy Shire amalgamated with the Municipality of Warren to form Warren Shire on 1 January 1957.
