= Ewenmar County =

Ewenmar New South Wales
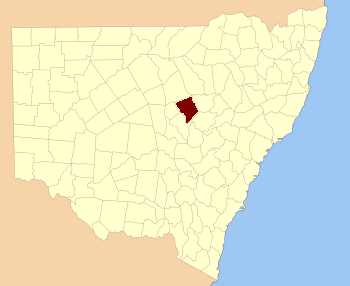
- Location in New South Wales
Lands administrative divisions around Ewenmar:
Gregory	Leichhardt	Gowen
Oxley	Ewenmar	Gowen
Narromine	Narromine	Lincoln

Ewenmar County is one of the 141 cadastral divisions of New South Wales. It is located between the Macquarie River on the west and the Castlereagh River on the east, between Warren and Gilgandra. The name derives from a local Aboriginal word.

== Parishes ==
A full list of parishes in this county, their current LGA and approximately central mapping coordinates follow:

Parish	LGA	Coordinates
Allamurgoola	Gilgandra Shire	31°25′54″S 148°30′04″E
Armatree	Coonamble Shire	31°23′54″S 148°24′04″E
Balladoran	Gilgandra Shire	31°47′54″S 148°35′04″E
Beemunnel	Warren Shire	31°41′54″S 148°02′04″E
Berida	Gilgandra Shire	31°34′54″S 148°28′04″E
Bobarah	Gilgandra Shire	31°39′54″S 148°37′04″E
Boebung	Gilgandra Shire	31°27′54″S 148°24′04″E
Bourbah	Warren Shire	31°23′54″S 148°16′04″E
Breelong	Gilgandra Shire	31°47′21″S 148°41′44″E
Bugabada	Narromine Shire	31°53′54″S 148°18′04″E
Bullagreen	Warren Shire	31°23′54″S 148°10′04″E
Bundemar	Warren Shire	31°49′54″S 148°14′04″E
Bundijoe	Warren Shire	31°47′54″S 148°16′04″E
Bundilla	Warren Shire	31°27′54″S 148°08′04″E
Bundobering	Gilgandra Shire	31°41′54″S 148°26′04″E
Bungey	Gilgandra Shire	31°43′54″S 148°33′04″E
Buramilong	Gilgandra Shire	31°37′54″S 148°31′04″E
Burroway	Narromine Shire	32°01′54″S 148°17′04″E
Carrigan	Narromine Shire	31°51′54″S 148°10′04″E
Cobboco	Gilgandra Shire	31°59′54″S 148°26′04″E
Collemburrawang	Warren Shire	31°27′54″S 147°50′04″E
Collie	Warren Shire	31°15′54″S 148°42′04″E
Connibong	Gilgandra Shire	31°27′54″S 148°20′04″E
Coolbaggie	Narromine Shire	32°08′54″S 148°24′04″E
Coradgerie	Warren Shire	31°35′54″S 148°14′04″E
Driel	Warren Shire	31°39′54″S 147°56′04″E
Drillwarrina	Gilgandra Shire	31°52′54″S 148°33′04″E
Eiraban	Gilgandra Shire	31°47′54″S 148°24′04″E
Emogandry	Narromine Shire	31°57′54″S 148°16′04″E
Emu	Gilgandra Shire	31°55′54″S 148°40′04″E
Eumungerie	Gilgandra Shire	31°56′54″S 148°32′04″E
Eura	Gilgandra Shire	31°49′54″S 148°42′04″E
Eurombedah	Narromine Shire	32°12′54″S 148°19′04″E
Gewah	Warren Shire	31°35′54″S 148°18′04″E
Gulargambone	Coonamble Shire	31°19′54″S 148°16′04″E
Healy	Warren Shire	31°25′54″S 148°22′04″E
Kickabil	Gilgandra Shire	31°53′54″S 148°22′04″E
Killendoon	Warren Shire	31°45′54″S 147°56′04″E
Merrigal	Warren Shire	31°27′54″S 148°14′04″E
Meryon	Warren Shire	31°35′54″S 148°08′04″E
Milda	Gilgandra Shire	31°31′54″S 148°31′04″E
Milpulling	Gilgandra Shire	31°46′54″S 148°30′04″E
Moonul	City of Dubbo	32°00′54″S 148°28′04″E
Narroweema	Warren Shire	31°43′54″S 148°10′04″E
Tacklebang	Gilgandra Shire	31°41′54″S 148°20′04″E
Tenandra	Warren Shire	31°27′54″S 147°56′04″E
Umangla	Warren Shire	31°35′54″S 147°48′04″E
Urobula	Warren Shire	31°41′54″S 148°10′04″E
Wambianna	Warren Shire	31°51′54″S 148°06′04″E
Warrie	Coonamble Shire	31°17′54″S 148°22′04″E
Wemabung	Warren Shire	30°59′54″S 148°04′04″E
Wirrigai	Narromine Shire	32°06′54″S 148°17′04″E
Wonbobbie	Warren Shire	31°33′54″S 147°58′04″E
