= Carrigan, New South Wales =

Carrigan Parish
- Coordinates: 31°42′S 147°50′E
- Country: Australia
- State: New South Wales
- LGA: Warren Shire

Government
  - State electorate: Barwon
  - Federal division: Parkes
- Postcode: 2824

Carrigan is a rural locality of Narromine Shire and it is a civil parish of County of Ewenmar Carrigan is on the Macquarie River east of Warren, New South Wales.
