= Wirrigai, New South Wales =

Wirrigai
- Coordinates: 31°42′S 147°50′E
- Country: Australia
- State: New South Wales
- LGA: Warren Shire

Wirrigai is a rural locality of Warren Shire 31°39′54″S 147°56′04″E a few miles north of Warren, New South Wales Driel is also a civil Parish of Ewenmar County, a cadastral division of New South Wales.

Wirrigai is on the Macquarie River and the economy is based in broad acre agriculture.
