= Oxley County =

Oxley
- Cadastral division
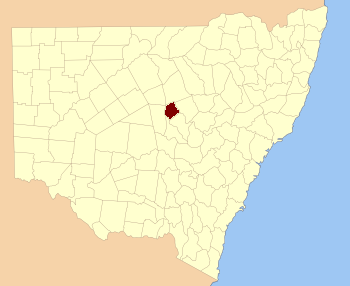
- Location in New South Wales
- Country: Australia
- State: New South Wales
Lands administrative divisions around Oxley
Canbelego	Gregory	Gregory
Flinders	Oxley	Ewenmar
Flinders	Kennedy	Narromine

Oxley County, New South Wales is one of the 141 cadastral divisions of New South Wales. It is located between the Bogan River on the west, and the Macquarie River on the east. This is the area approximately between Warren and Nyngan.

Oxley County was named in honour of Surveyor-General and explorer John Joseph William Molesworth Oxley (1785–1828).

The county is roughly a diamond shape and is located generally between the Bogan and Macquarie Rivers in central New South Wales.

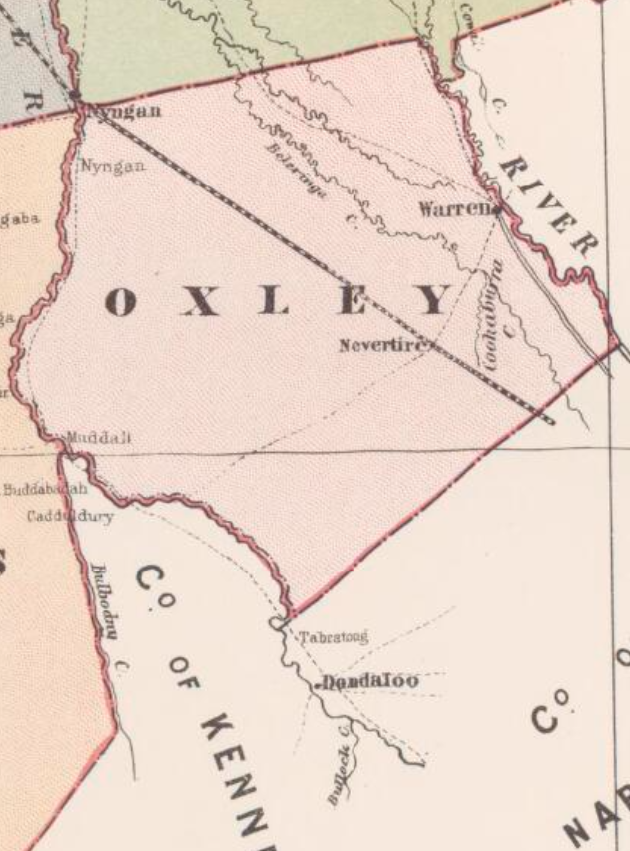
Map of Oxley County in New South Wales in 1876

There are three towns in the county, Nyngan along the western edge and Warren on the Macquarie river, in the east and the nearby railway junction of Nevertire.

The entire Country is incorporated, with seats of local government at Warren and Nyngan.

The economy of the country is mostly broad acre farming though some intensive industrial agriculture is found at Snakes Plain between Warren and Nevertire. The topography of the country is flat and it has a Koppen Climate Classification of BsK (Hot Semi Arid).

== Parishes within this county ==
A full list of parishes found within this county; their current LGA and mapping coordinates to the approximate centre of each location is as follows:

Parish	LGA	Coordinates
Balcombe	Warren Shire	31°59′54″S 147°30′04″E
Beablebar	Warren Shire	31°47′54″S 147°24′04″E
Beardina	Warren Shire	31°27′54″S 147°38′04″E
Beelban	Warren Shire	31°49′54″S 147°36′04″E
Beleringar	Warren Shire	31°34′54″S 147°36′04″E
Boro	Warren Shire	31°59′54″S 147°37′04″E
Buddabadah	Bogan Shire	31°53′54″S 147°14′04″E
Cajildry	Warren Shire	32°14′54″S 147°18′04″E
Carual	Warren Shire	31°37′54″S 147°44′04″E
Cookandoon	Bogan Shire	31°35′54″S 147°24′04″E
Cremorne	Warren Shire	31°53′54″S 147°26′04″E
Curtis	Warren Shire	32°02′54″S 147°34′04″E
Darouble	Bogan Shire	31°41′54″S 147°14′04″E
Dooran	Warren Shire	31°33′54″S 147°38′04″E
Egelabra	Warren Shire	31°47′54″S 147°50′04″E
Eilginbah	Warren Shire	31°43′54″S 147°38′04″E
Elengerah	Warren Shire	31°51′54″S 147°54′04″E
Ganalgang	Warren Shire	31°49′54″S 147°56′04″E
Garfield	Warren Shire	31°53′54″S 147°32′04″E
Garule	Warren Shire	31°49′54″S 147°04′04″E
Gunningba	Warren Shire	31°39′54″S 147°40′04″E
Kungerbil	Bogan Shire	31°35′54″S 147°18′04″E
Lawson	Warren Shire	31°43′54″S 147°46′04″E
Mudall	Bogan Shire	31°51′54″S 147°12′04″E
Mulla Mulla	Bogan Shire	31°45′54″S 147°20′04″E
Mullengudgery	Warren Shire	31°35′54″S 147°28′04″E
Mumbrabah	Warren Shire	31°43′54″S 147°26′04″E
Mungeribar	Bogan Shire	31°39′54″S 147°22′04″E
Narrar	Warren Shire	31°27′54″S 147°32′04″E
Narromine	Warren Shire	31°51′54″S 147°50′04″E
Nevertire	Warren Shire	31°59′54″S 147°41′04″E
Nyngan	Bogan Shire	31°35′54″S 147°12′04″E
Ruby	Bogan Shire	31°51′54″S 147°18′04″E
Rutledge	Bogan Shire	31°51′54″S 147°24′04″E
Tabratong	Warren Shire	32°06′54″S 147°31′04″E
Terangan	Warren Shire	32°00′54″S 147°26′04″E
Terooble	Warren Shire	31°33′54″S 147°32′04″E
The Plains	Bogan Shire	31°47′54″S 147°10′04″E
Trowan	Warren Shire	31°45′54″S 147°28′04″E
Warien	Warren Shire	31°39′54″S 147°28′04″E
Warren	Warren Shire	31°39′54″S 147°46′04″E
Wera	Bogan Shire	31°43′54″S 147°14′04″E
Woolartha	Warren Shire	31°39′54″S 147°34′04″E
