= Beelban Parish, New South Wales =

Rural locality

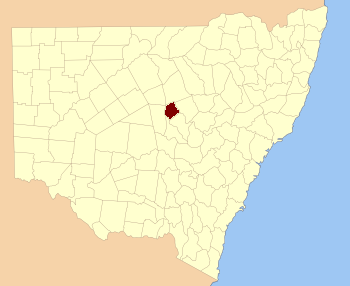
Oxley County NSW.

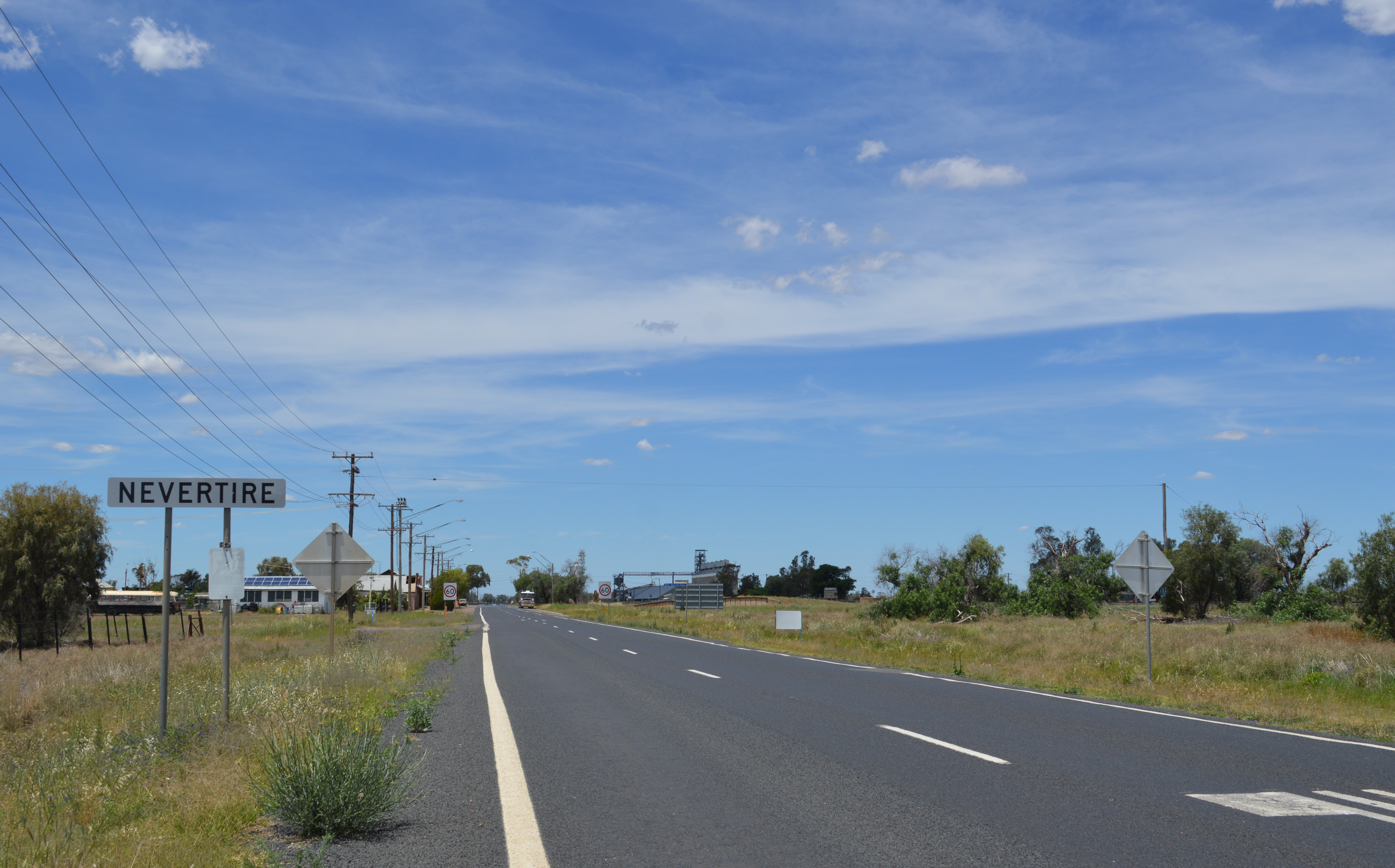
Nevertire Town Entry

Beelban Parish (Oxley County), New South Wales is a rural locality of Warren Shire and a civil parish of Oxley County, New South Wales, a Cadastral divisions of New South Wales.

== Geography ==
The parish is on the Main Western railway line just east of Nyngan.

The only town of the parish is the Railway junction of Nevertire, New South Wales, and the economy of the parish is based on broad acre agriculture of sheep, cattle and wheat.

The topography is flat with a Köppen climate classification of BsK (Hot semi arid).

The economy in the parish is based on broad acre agriculture, based on Wheat, sheep and cattle.

The traditional owners of the area are the Wiradjuri people.
