= Dooran Parish, New South Wales =

Rural locality of Warren Shire and a civil parish of Oxley County, New South Wales

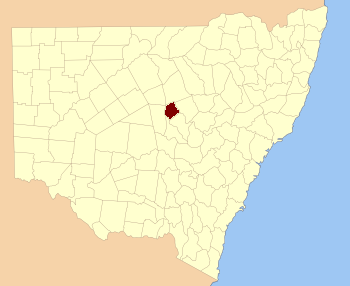
Oxley County NSW.

Dooran Parish (Oxley County), New South Wales is a rural locality of Warren Shire and a civil parish of Oxley County, New South Wales, a Cadastral divisions of New South Wales.

The parish is on the Macquarie River east of Nyngan and west of Warren, New South Wales.

The economy of the parish is based on broad acre agriculture, mostly sheep cattle and wheat. The topography is flat with a Köppen climate classification of BsK (Hot semi arid).

The traditional owners of the area are the Wiradjuri and Wailwan people.
