= Bryan Egan =

- Full name: Bryan Colden Egan
- Born: 27 November 1915 Warren, NSW, Australia
- Died: 25 July 1970 (aged 54) Dubbo, NSW, Australia
- School: The King's School
- Notable relative(s): Ben Egan (brother); Tom Egan (brother)

Rugby union career
- Position: Centre
Provincial / State sides
Years	Team	Apps	(Points)
1936	New South Wales	2	(0)
International career
Years	Team	Apps	(Points)
1936	Australia		

Bryan Colden Egan (27 November 1915 – 25 July 1970) was an Australian international rugby union player.

Born in Warren, New South Wales, Egan was the younger brother of Wallabies and Waratahs centre Ben Egan. He attended The King's School in Parramatta and played his club rugby for Eastern Suburbs.

Egan earned state representative honours in 1936 and was one of the Wallabies centres chosen for that year's tour of New Zealand, where he featured in three uncapped matches, scoring a try on debut against Wairarapa-Bush.

A grazier by profession, Egan farmed in Mount Harris near Warren and served in New Guinea during World War II. His son Jack was King's School captain in 1959 and became a well known cricket historian.

== See also ==
- List of Australia national rugby union players
