= Narromine Parish, New South Wales =

Narromine Parish
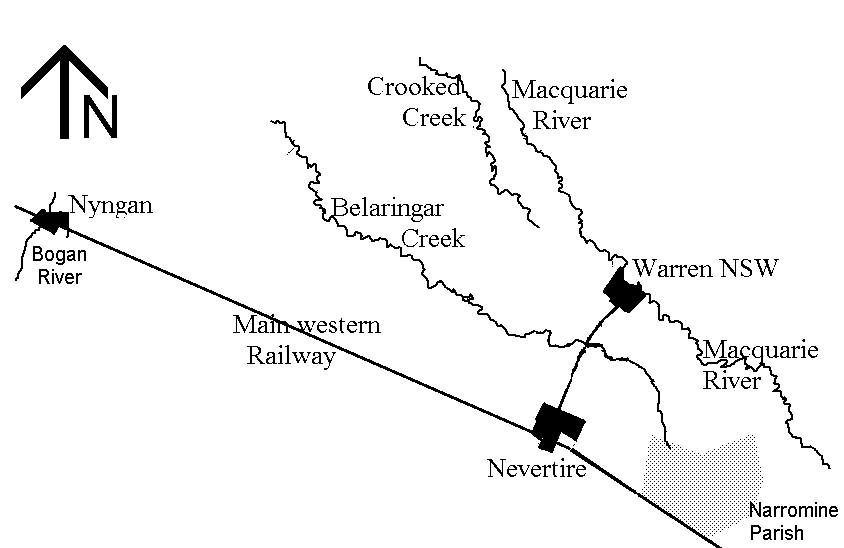
- Map of Narromine Parish in the County of Oxley, New South Wales

- Coordinates: 31°51′S 147°43′E
- Country: Australia
- State: New South Wales
- Region: Central West, New South Wales
- LGA: Warren Shire

Government
  - State electorate: Barwon
  - Federal division: Parkes
- County: Oxley

Narromine Parish is a civil parish of Oxley County, New South Wales. It is located in Warren Shire at 31°51′54″S 147°50′04″E. The Parish is some kilometers from the town of Narromine which is in the adjoining Narromine County.

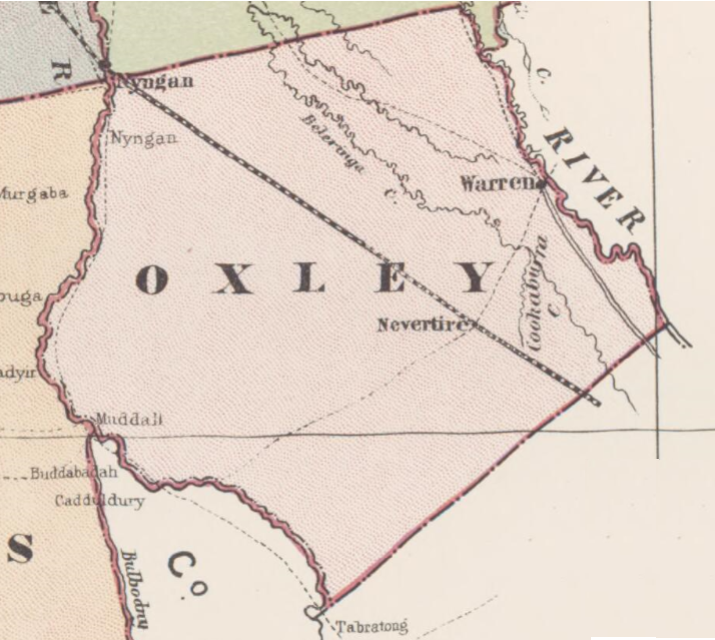
Oxley County John Sands 1886 Map.

The Parish is located between the Macquarie River and the Main Western railway line, New South Wales just outside the town of Nevertire, New South Wales.

The topography is flat with a Köppen climate classification of BsK (Hot semi arid) and the economy is based on broad acre agriculture.

The traditional owners of the area are the Wiradjuri people.
