= Eilginbah, New South Wales =

Australian County

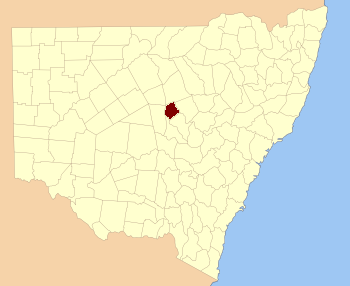
Oxley County NSW.

Elinginbah, New South Wales is a rural locality of Bogan Shire and a civil parish of Oxley County, New South Wales, a Cadastral divisions of New South Wales.

The parish is between the Belaringar Creek and the Main Western railway line between Nevertire junction and Nyngan. There is a (disused) railway station at Mullengudgery.

The economy of the parish is based on broad acre agriculture of sheep, cattle and wheat.

The topography is flat with a Köppen climate classification of BsK (Hot semi arid).

The economy in the parish is based on broad acre agriculture, based on Wheat, sheep and cattle.

The traditional owners of the area are the Wiradjuri people.
