= Driel, New South Wales =

Driel
- Coordinates: 31°42′S 147°50′E
- Country: Australia
- State: New South Wales
- LGA: Warren Shire

Government
  - State electorate: Barwon
  - Federal division: Parkes
- Elevation: 198 m (650 ft)
- Postcode: 2824
- Mean max temp: 25.2 °C (77.4 °F)
- Mean min temp: 10.5 °C (50.9 °F)
- Annual rainfall: 515.8 mm (20.31 in)

Driel is a rural locality of Warren Shire 31°39′54″S 147°56′04″E a few miles north of Warren, New South Wales. It is also a civil Parish of Ewenmar County, a cadastral division of New South Wales.

== History ==
Before European settlement the area is said to have been occupied by the Ngiyambaa Aborigines. Some say the name Warren the nearest town derives from a local Aboriginal word, meaning "strong" or "substantial".

Explorer John Oxley camped on the present Warren township site during his investigation of the Macquarie River in 1818. He noted an abundance of kangaroos and emus. Charles Sturt carried out further exploration in 1828–29. Cattle were grazing in the Driel area by the late 1830s.

The arrival of the railway was in 1898 and Burrendong Dam was opened in 1967, allowing the development of cotton and produce.
