= Beardina Parish, New South Wales =

Rural Australian town

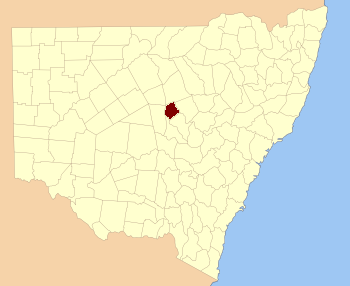
Oxley County NSW.

Beardina Parish (Oxley County), New South Wales is a rural locality of Warren Shire and a civil parish of Oxley County, New South Wales, a Cadastral divisions of New South Wales.

The parish is on the Macquarie River east of Nyngan, down stream of Warren, New South Wales.

The topography is flat with a Köppen climate classification of BsK (Hot semi arid).

The economy in the parish is based on broad acre agriculture, based on Wheat, sheep and cattle.

The traditional owners of the area are the Wiradjuri people.
