= Killendoon, New South Wales =

Killendoon
- Town
- Coordinates: 31°42′S 147°50′E
- Country: Australia
- State: New South Wales
- LGA: Warren Shire

Government
  - State electorate: Barwon
  - Federal division: Parkes
- Postcode: 2824

Killendoon is a rural locality of Warren Shire and is in the civil parish of County of Ewenmar. Killendoon is on the Ewenma Creek Macquarie River outside Warren, New South Wales.

== History ==
Before European settlement the area is said to have been occupied by the Ngiyambaa Aborigines. Explorer John Oxley camped on the present town site during his investigation of the Macquarie River in 1818. He noted an abundance of kangaroos and emus. Charles Sturt carried out further exploration in 1828–29. Cattle were grazing hereabouts by the late 1830s.

Warren station was established in 1845 by Thomas Readford and William Lawson, the son of explorer William Lawson who was a member of the first European party to breach the Blue Mountains in 1813. Some say the name derives from a local Aboriginal word, meaning "strong" or "substantial". Another theory is that it represents the adoption of a contemporary English term, "warren", meaning a game park - perhaps a reference to the picturesque riverside setting where the station hut was built (on what is now Macquarie Park) and to the large numbers of wildlife in the area.

A post office opened in 1861, a bootmaker's shop (made of bark) in 1863, a store in 1866, a school in 1867, an Anglican church in 1873, the first courthouse in 1874 and the first bridge in 1875. However, closer settlement did not really develop until the late 1880s.

Warren was incorporated as a municipality in 1895 and the Warren Weir was established in 1896. The town benefited greatly with the arrival of the railway in 1898, making it the rail head for an enormous area. In general terms, its prosperity rose and fell with the price of wool. In the 1920s the town developed quite substantially. In the Great Depression the economy shrank, expanding again in the postwar years. The eternal water shortage was greatly eased when Burrendong Dam was opened in 1967, allowing the development of cotton and produce.
