= Egelabra, New South Wales =

Egelabra Parish
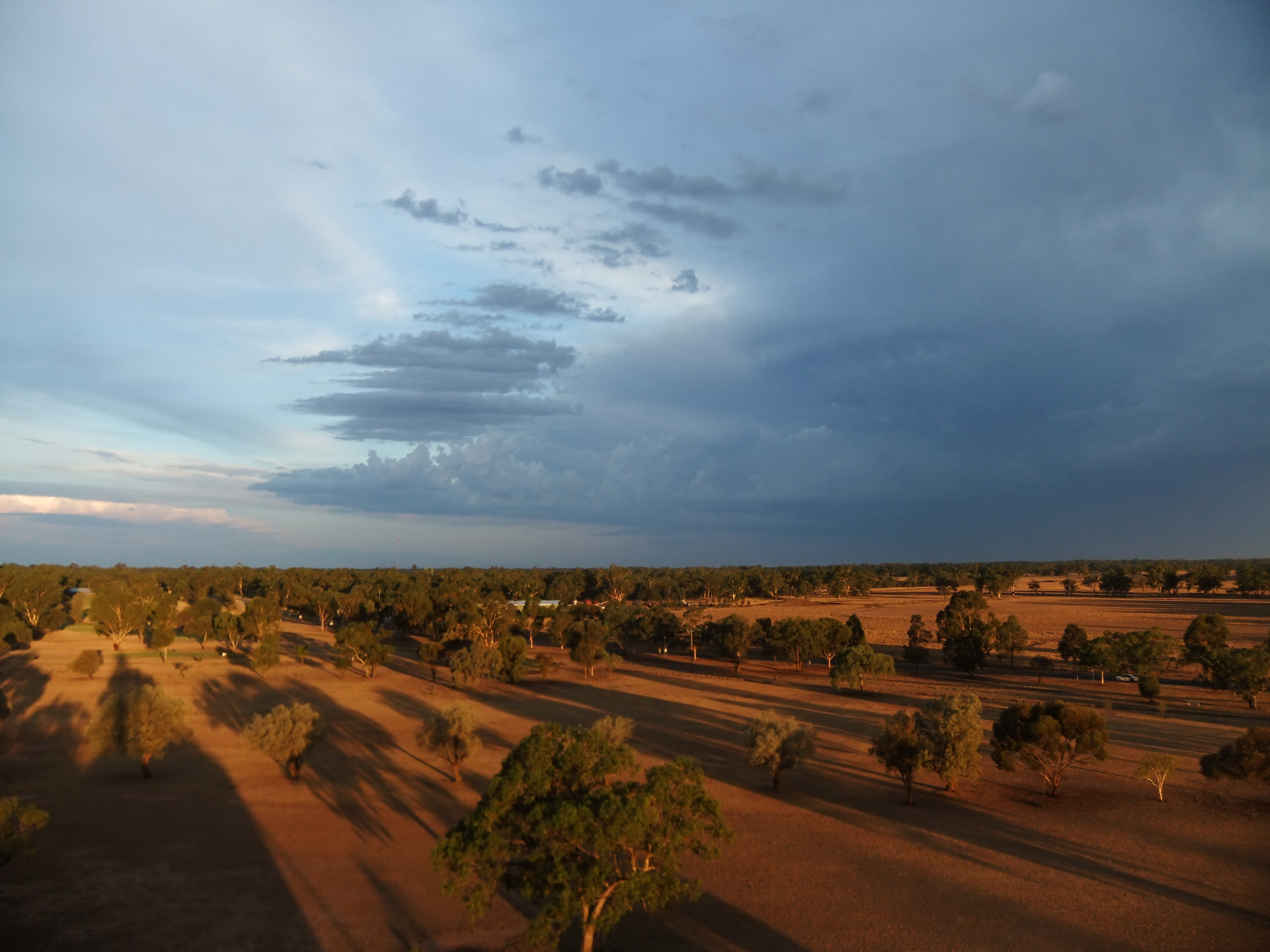
- Warren, NSW with Egelabra in distance.

- Coordinates: 31°42′S 147°50′E
- Country: Australia
- State: New South Wales
- LGA: Warren Shire

Government
  - State electorate: Barwon
  - Federal division: Parkes
- Elevation: 198 m (650 ft)
- Postcode: 2824
- Mean max temp: 25.2 °C (77.4 °F)
- Mean min temp: 10.5 °C (50.9 °F)
- Annual rainfall: 515.8 mm (20.31 in)

Egelabra, New South Wales is a civil parish and rural locality of New South Wales, Australia, located at 31°47′54″S 147°50′04″E.

== Description ==
=== Egelabra Parish ===
Egelabra Parish (Oxley County), New South Wales is a civil parish of Oxley County, New South Wales, a Cadastral divisions of New South Wales.

=== Egelabra Locality ===
Egelabra, New South Wales is a rural locality of Warren Shire. The parish is on Crooked Creek and also on the Macquarie River east of Nyngan, and outside of Warren, New South Wales. The economy of Egelabra is based on broad acre agriculture, mainly sheep, cattle and wheat.

== Geography ==
The topography is flat with a Köppen climate classification of BsK (Hot semi arid).

The economy in the parish is based on broad acre agriculture, based on Wheat, sheep and cattle.

The traditional owners of the area are the Wiradjuri people.

== History ==
Before European settlement the area is said to have been occupied by the Ngiyambaa Aborigines. Some say the name Warren derives from a local Aboriginal word, meaning "strong" or "substantial".

Explorer John Oxley camped on the present site of Warren during his investigation of the Macquarie River in 1818. He noted an abundance of kangaroos and emus.

Charles Sturt carried out further exploration in 1828–29.

Cattle were grazing in the area by the late 1830s. Warren station was established in 1845 by Thomas Readford and William Lawson, the son of explorer William Lawson who was a member of the first European party to breach the Blue Mountains in 1813.

The railway arrived in 1898 and Burrendong Dam was opened in 1967, allowing the development of cotton and produce.
