= Mumbrabah, New South Wales =

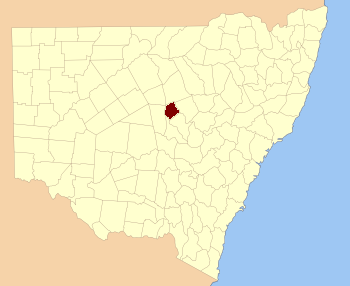
Oxley County NSW.

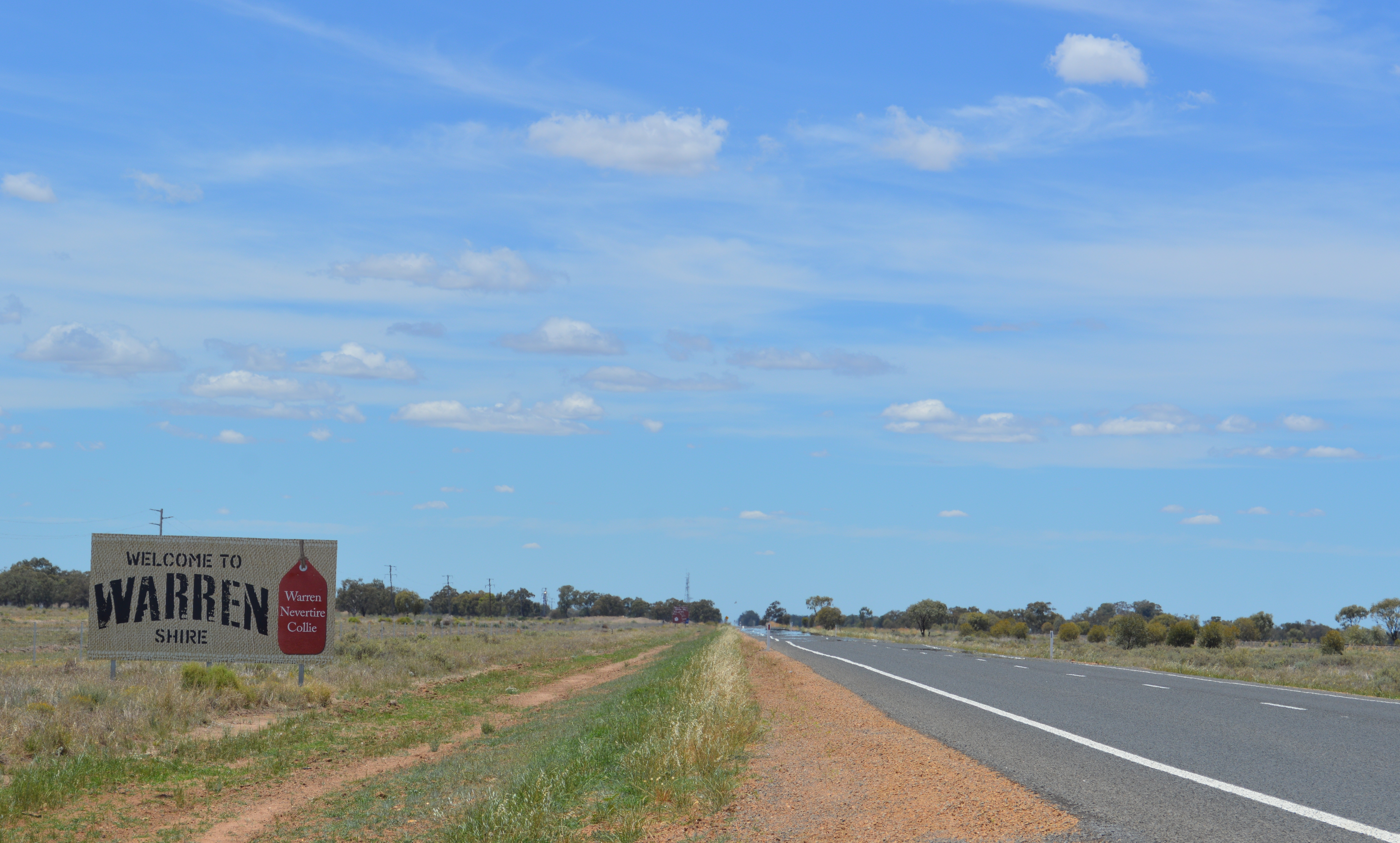
Warren Shire Boundary Sign Mitchell Highway, Mumbrabah.

Mumbrabah Parish (Oxley County), New South Wales is a rural locality of Warren Shire and a civil parish of Oxley County, New South Wales, a Cadastral divisions of New South Wales.

The parish is on the Main Western railway line just east of Nyngan. There is a (disused) railway Station at Mullengudgery.

The economy of the parish is based on broad acre agriculture of sheep, cattle and wheat.

The topography is flat with a Köppen climate classification of BsK (Hot semi arid).

The traditional owners of the area are the Wiradjuri people.
