= Trangie railway station =

Former railway station in New South Wales, Australia

Trangie
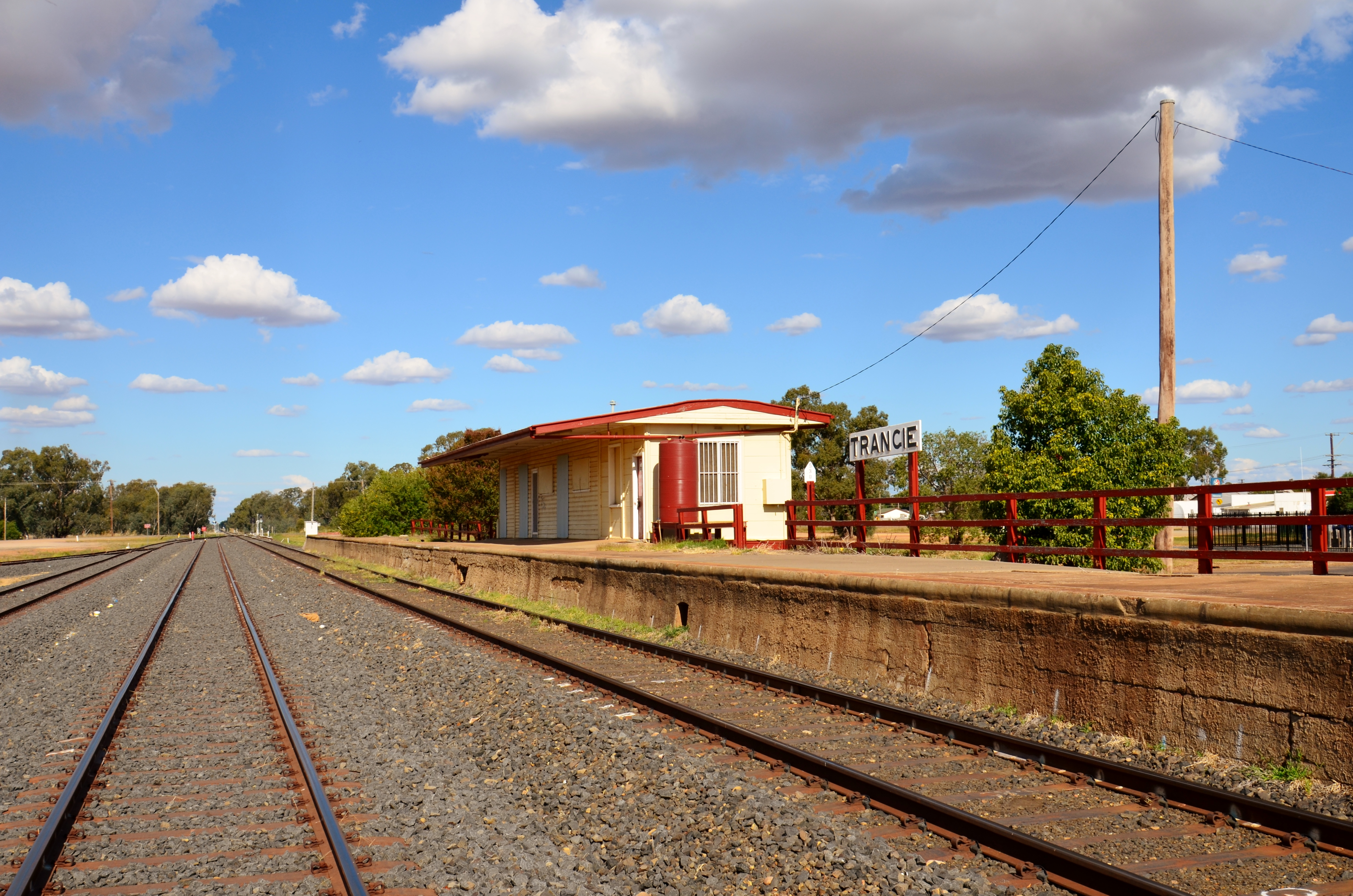
- The disused station platform in April 2017

General information
- Location: Dandaloo Street, Trangie; New South Wales; Australia
- Coordinates: 32.0310°S 147.9853°E
- Line: Main Western
- Distance: 530.500 km (329.637 mi) from Central
- Platforms: 1 (1 side)
- Tracks: 4

Construction
- Structure type: Ground

Other information
- Status: Disused

History
- Opened: 1 May 1883 (143 years ago)

Services
Preceding station	Former services	Following station
Nevertire towards Bourke	Main Western Line	Narromine towards Sydney
Location

Trangie railway station is a former regional railway station located on the Main Western line, serving the Orana town of Trangie.

== History ==
Trangie station opened in 1883, initially as a passing loop and siding, the only one between Narromine and Nevertire. It was named after a local pastoral holding. The station consists of a side platform and station building which survives in good condition.

== Gallery ==
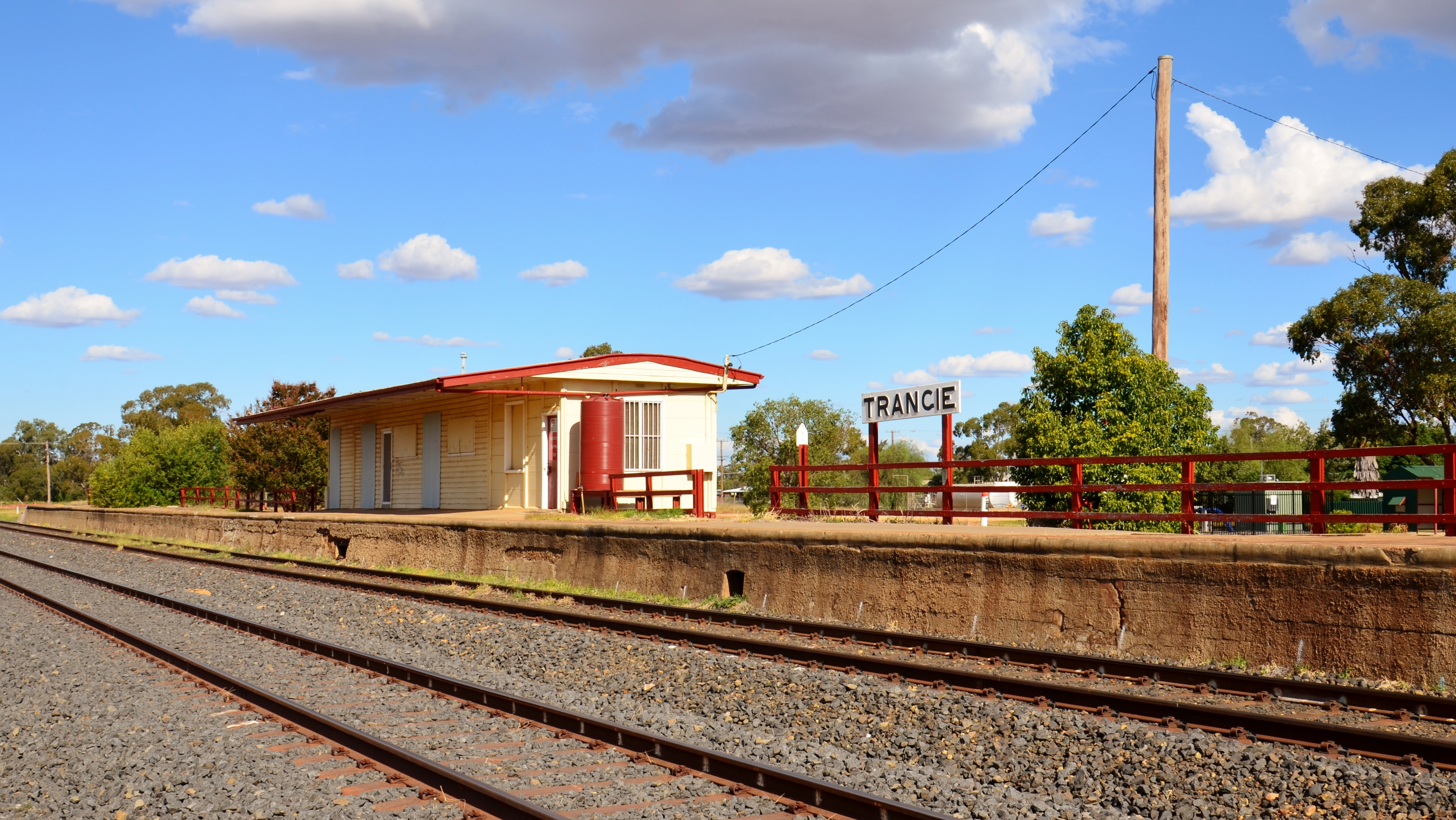
A closer view of the station platform in April 2017

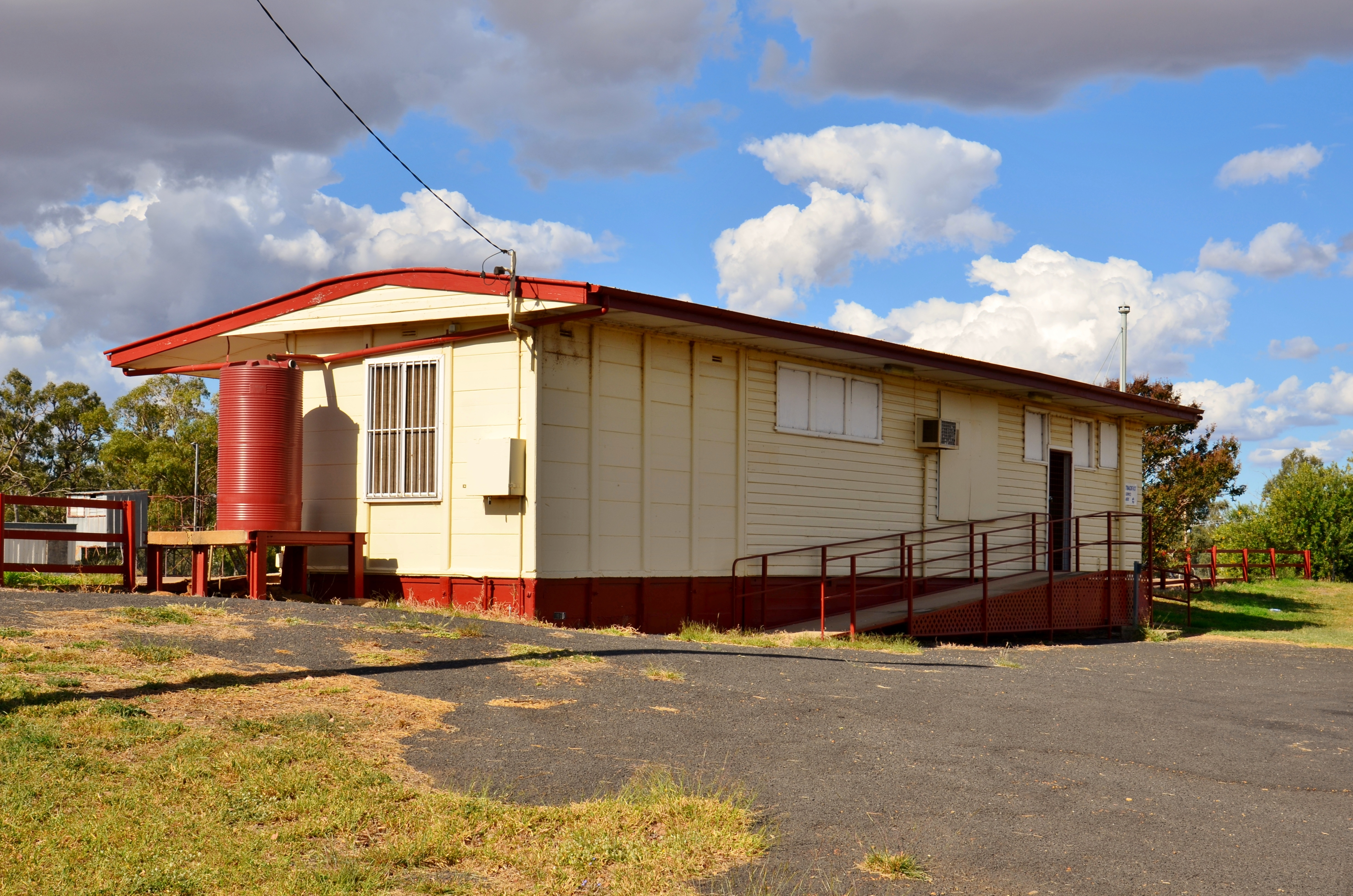
The entrance to the station in April 2017
