= Minore railway station =

Former railway station in New South Wales, Australia

Minore

General information
- Location: Narromine Street, Minore; New South Wales; Australia
- Coordinates: 32.2591°S 148.4569°E
- Line: Main Western
- Distance: 476.700 km (296.208 mi) from Central
- Platforms: 1 (1 side)
- Tracks: 1

Construction
- Structure type: Ground

Other information
- Status: Demolished

History
- Opened: 6 June 1887 (139 years ago)
- Closed: 20 October 1975 (50 years ago)
- Former names: Manoa (1887–unknown)

Services
Preceding station	Former services	Following station
Narromine towards Bourke	Main Western Line	Dubbo towards Sydney
Location

Minore railway station was a regional railway station located on the Main Western line, serving the Orana locality of Minore.

== History ==
Minore station opened in 1887 as Manoa. It was renamed Minore at an unknown date, and closed to passenger services in 1975. The station building subsequently demolished. However, a safeworking hut was built on the platform by the 1990s for use by railway workers, and by 2007 the platform was still in staff use.
