= Terangan, New South Wales =

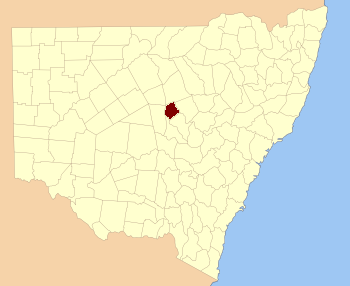
Oxley County NSW.

Terangan is a rural locality of Warren Shire and a civil parish of Oxley County, New South Wales, a Cadastral divisions of New South Wales.

The parish is on the Bogan River south east of Nyngan.

The topography is flat with a Köppen climate classification of BsK (Hot semi arid).

The economy in the parish is based on broad acre agriculture, based on Wheat, sheep and cattle.

The traditional owners of the area are the Wiradjuri people.
