= Minore =

Minore may refer to:

- Minore, New South Wales, Australia
- Jack Minore (1938–2021), American politician
