= Ben Egan =

Ben Egan may refer to:

- Ben Egan (baseball)
- Ben Egan (rugby union)
