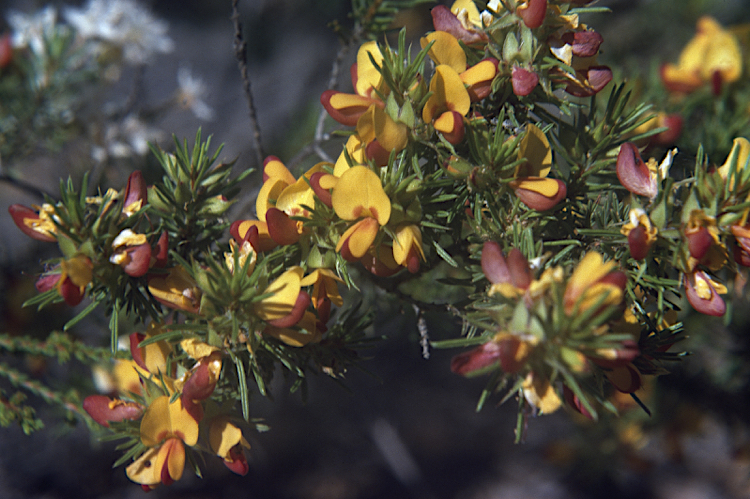
- Near Gilgandra

Scientific classification
- Kingdom: Plantae
- Clade: Tracheophytes
- Clade: Angiosperms
- Clade: Eudicots
- Clade: Rosids
- Order: Fabales
- Family: Fabaceae
- Subfamily: Faboideae
- Genus: Pultenaea
- Species: P. boormanii

Binomial name
- Pultenaea boormanii H.B.Will.

= Pultenaea boormanii =

Species of mistletoe

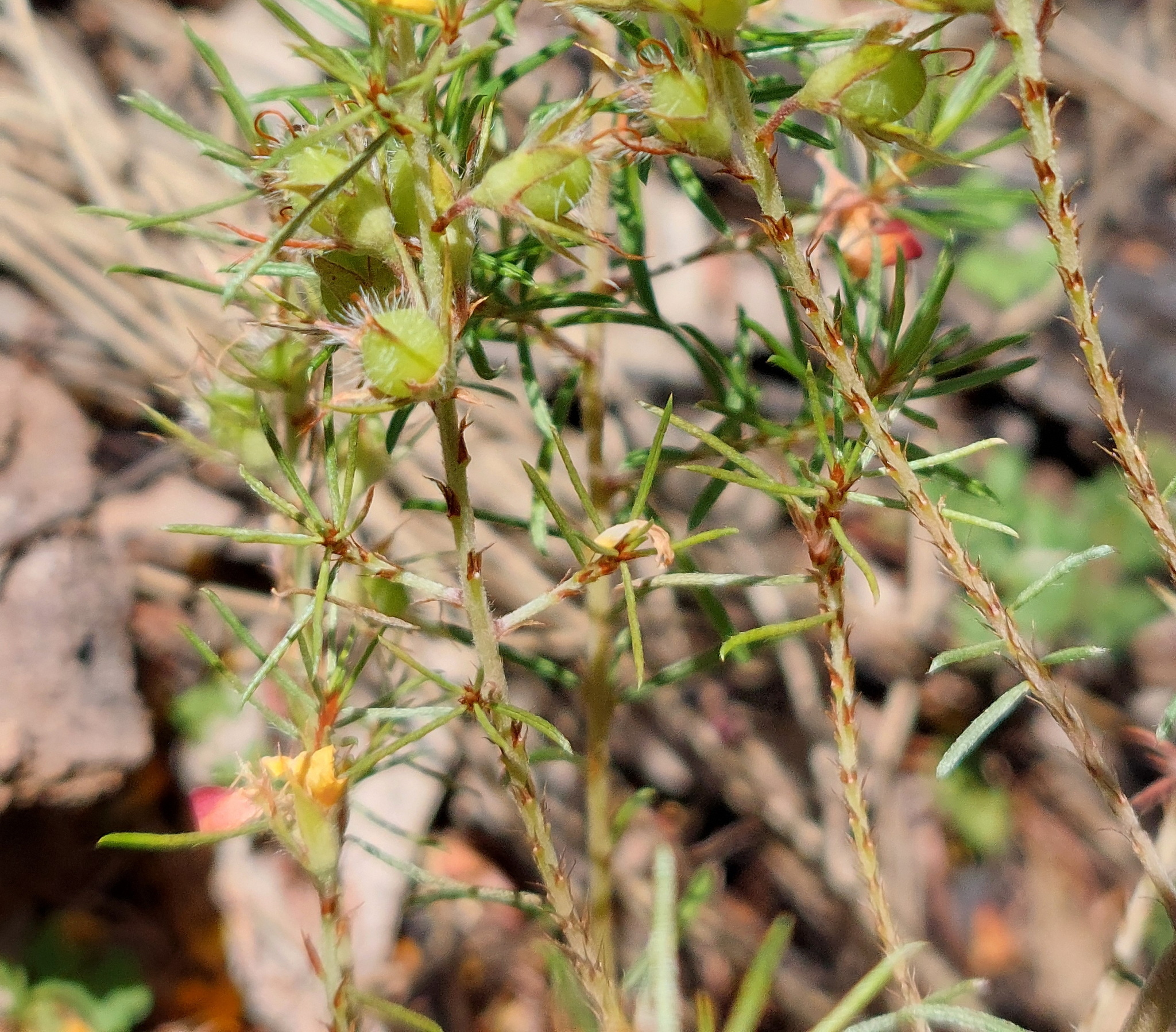
Fruit in the Pilliga Scrub

Pultenaea boormanii is a species of flowering plant in the family Fabaceae and is endemic to New South Wales. It is an erect to low-lying shrub with linear, grooved leaves, pea-like flowers arranged near the ends of branchlets, and inflated pods.

== Description ==
Pultenaea boormanii is a erect to low-lying shrub with hairy stems. The leaves are linear, 5–12 mm (0.20–0.47 in) long and 0.5–1 mm (0.020–0.039 in) wide with stipules 2–3 mm (0.079–0.118 in) long at the base, the upper surface with a longitudinal groove and the tip pointed and turned downwards. The flowers are borne among leaves at the ends of the branchlets, and are 7–10 mm (0.28–0.39 in) long, each flower on a pedicel up to about 1–2 mm (0.039–0.079 in) long with bracteoles 4–7 mm (0.16–0.28 in) long at the base of the sepals. The sepals are 5–9 mm (0.20–0.35 in) long. The fruit is an inflated pod about 5 mm (0.20 in) long.

== Taxonomy ==
Pultenaea boormanii was first formally described in 1922 by Herbert Bennett Williamson in the Proceedings of the Royal Society of Victoria, from specimens originally collected by John Luke Boorman at Minore in 1899.

== Distribution and habitat ==
This species of pea grows in forest to woodland on sandy soil from the Pilliga Scrub to the Dubbo district.
