= Ben Egan (rugby union) =

- Full name: John Bernard Egan
- Born: 8 July 1908 Warren, NSW, Australia
- Died: 24 August 1961 (aged 53)
- School: The Kings School

Rugby union career
- Position: Centre
International career
Years	Team	Apps	(Points)
1927–28	Australia		

John Bernard "Ben" Egan (8 July 1908 – 24 August 1961) was an Australian international rugby union player.

Egan grew up in a sporting family from Warren, New South Wales. His brother Thomas was a state representative cricketer and his younger brother Bryan toured with the Wallabies. They all attended The Kings School.

An Eastern Suburbs centre, Egan was the youngest member of the New South Wales squad on the 1927–28 northern hemisphere tour, aged only 18. Wallabies caps were retrospectively awarded for the tour's international matches, because the Waratahs were the country's sole representative team at the time, but Egan only featured in seven uncapped tour fixtures. A leg injury suffered during the tour sidelined him throughout 1928 and he spent the year in the country as a jackaroo. He didn't play for his state again until 1930, in a win over the visiting British Lions.

== See also ==
- List of Australia national rugby union players
