= Narromine railway station =

Former railway station in New South Wales, Australia

Narromine
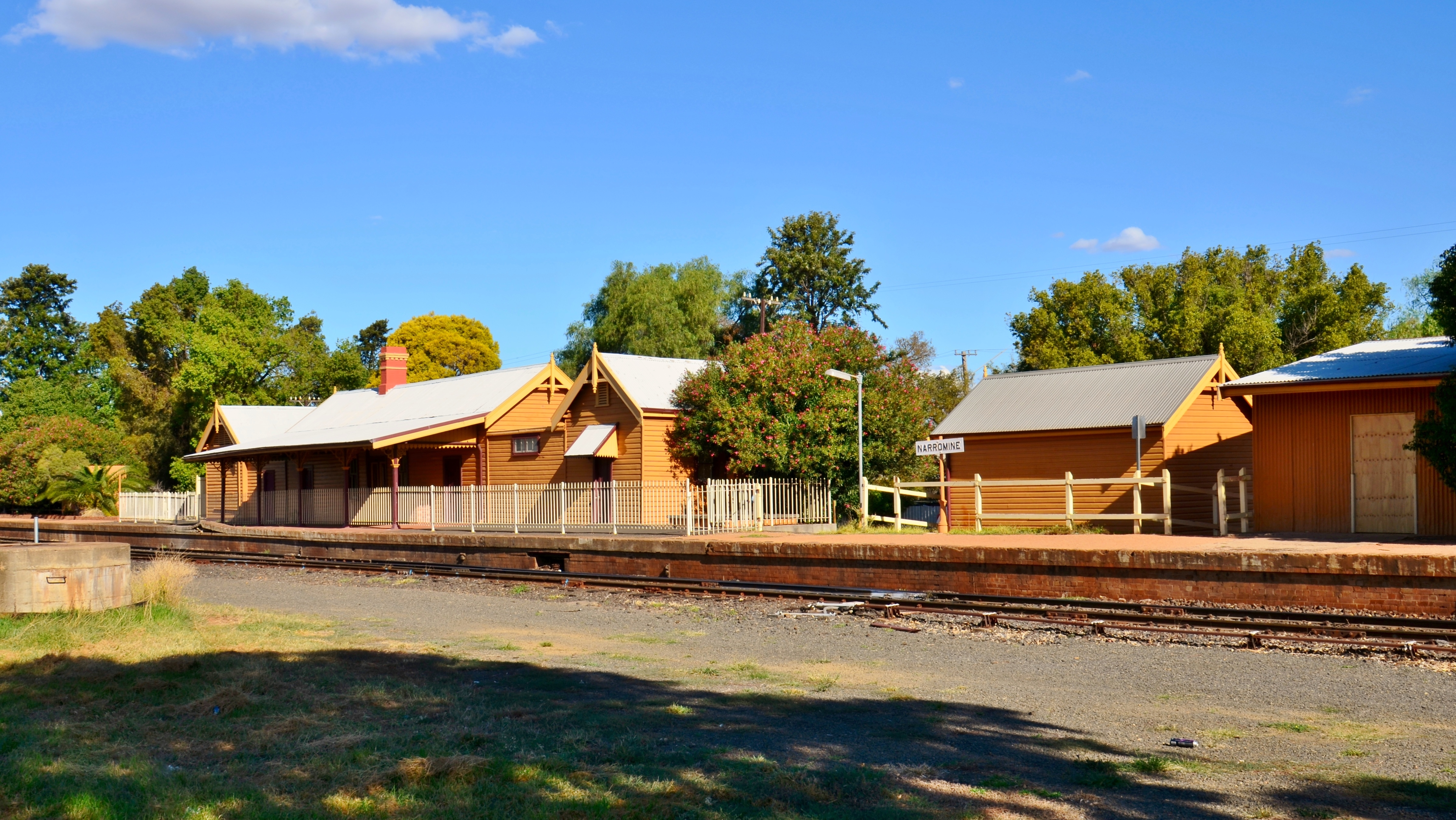
- The station viewed from across the tracks in 2017

General information
- Location: Derribong Avenue, Narromine; New South Wales; Australia
- Coordinates: 32.2343°S 148.2405°E
- Owner: Transport Asset Manager of New South Wales
- Lines: Main Western; Parkes–Narromine railway line
- Distance: 497.554 km (309.166 mi) from Central
- Platforms: 1 (1 side)
- Tracks: 2

Construction
- Structure type: Ground

Other information
- Status: Reused

History
- Opened: 1 May 1883 (143 years ago)
- Closed: 20 October 1975 (50 years ago)
- Former names: Narramine (1883–1889)

Services
Preceding station	Former services	Following station
Trangie towards Bourke	Main Western Line	Minore towards Sydney
Narwonah towards Parkes	Parkes–Narromine Line	Terminus
Location

Narromine railway station is a former regional railway station located on the Main Western line, serving the Orana town of Narromine. It is currently reused as a coach stop by NSW TrainLink.

== History ==
Narromine station opened in 1883 but by 1939 revenue at the station was declining, and by 1954 the station was in a state of disrepair. The station survives in good condition and has been restored. It is used by NSW TrainLink coaches.

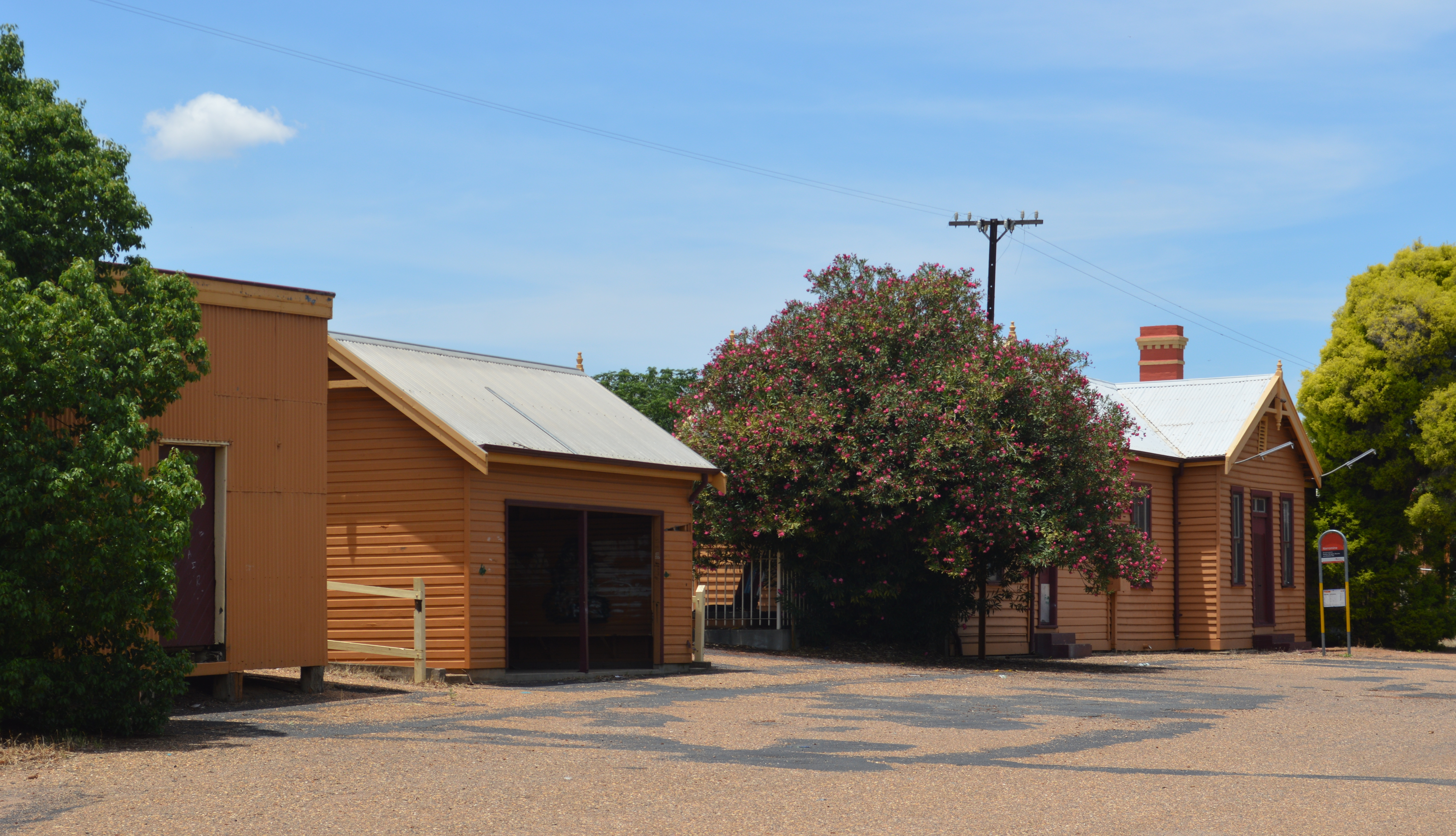
Narromine station, with the coach stop sign visible on the right

To the west of Narromine station lies the junction of the Parkes–Narromine railway line, which forms part of a cross country route to the Main Southern railway line at Cootamundra.
