= Bundemar, New South Wales =

Bundemar New South Wales
- Coordinates: 31°46′54″S 148°4′4″E
- Population: 38 (2021 census)
- Postcode(s): 2823
- Location: 472.8 km (294 mi) NW of Sydney; 71.1 km (44 mi) NW of Dubbo; 65.6 km (41 mi) NW of Narromine
- LGA(s): Narromine Shire; Warren Shire
- State electorate(s): Dubbo; Barwon
- Federal division(s): Parkes

Bundemar is a locality in the Orana region of New South Wales, Australia. The locality is 473 kilometres (294 mi) north west of the state capital Sydney. It is part of Narromine Shire and Warren Shire local government area.

== Population ==
As of the 2021 Australian census, 38 people resided in Bundemar, down from 42 in the 2016 census. The median age of persons in Bundemar was 41 years. There were more males than females, with 55.0% of the population male and 45.0% female. The average household size was 3.1 people per household.
