= Nyngan Parish (Oxley County), New South Wales =

Locality in New South Wales, Australia

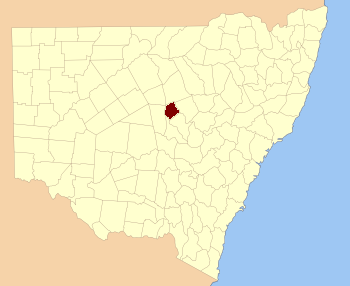
Oxley County NSW.

Nyngan Parish (Oxley County), New South Wales is a rural locality of Bogan Shire and a civil parish of Oxley County, New South Wales. a Cadastral divisions of New South Wales.

The parish is on the Bogan River and the main town of the Parish is Nyngan.

The topography is flat with a Köppen climate classification of BsK (Hot semi arid).

The economy in the parish is derived from broad acre agriculture, based on Wheat, sheep and cattle.

The traditional owners of the area are the Ngiyambaa. people.
