= Darouble, New South Wales =

Rural locality in New South Wales

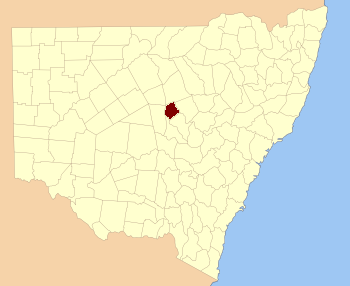
Oxley County NSW.

Darouble Parish (Oxley County), New South Wales is a rural locality of Bogan Shire and a civil parish of Oxley County, New South Wales, a Cadastral divisions of New South Wales.

== Geography ==
The parish is on the Bogan River south of Nyngan.

The topography is flat with a Köppen climate classification of BsK (Hot semi arid).

The economy in the parish is based on broad acre agriculture, based on Wheat, sheep and cattle.

The traditional owners of the area are the Wiradjuri people.
