= Warren railway line =

Railway line in New South Wales, Australia

The Warren railway line is an operational railway line in New South Wales, Australia. It is a 20 kilometres (12 mi)–long branch from the Main West line at the town of Nevertire and heads in a northerly direction to the town of Warren. The line opened in 1898 and is used for grain haulage.

== Current state ==
The line is unballasted which causes severe speed restrictions over the entire branch. The Auscott siding at Snakes Plain serves an adjacent cotton processing facility which opened in 1995. Today the line has been proposed for closure due to its condition.
