= Burroway, New South Wales =

Burroway is a bounded rural locality to the north of Narromine township and east of Buddah in New South Wales, Australia. The area at Latitude 32° 05' 00" S and Longitude 148° 16' 00" E is roughly equivalent to the cadastral parishes of Burroway and Emogandry in the county of Ewenmar and is in Narromine Shire.

The area is characterised by agricultural activities, predominantly grazing, and in the 2011 Australian Census had a population of 364: 54.1% male and 45.9% female with an average age of 44 years. English was the first language of 90.6% of the population and Anglican (32.6%) and Catholic (28.7%) were the main religions. The median household income is $1294.00 per week.

The topography is flat and predominantly cleared of vegetation, with Timbrebongie Falls, Ewenmar Creek and the Macquarie River the main geographic features.
