= Snakes Plain, New South Wales =

Snakes Plain New South Wales
- Coordinates: 31°46′39.9″S 147°45′33.4″E
- Population: 9 (2016 census)
- Postcode(s): 2824
- Time zone: AEST (UTC+10)
  - Summer (DST): AEDT (UTC+11)
- Location: 11 km (7 mi) SW of Warren; 95 km (59 mi) NW of Dubbo; 397 km (247 mi) NW of Sydney
- LGA(s): Warren Shire
- Region: Orana
- State electorate(s): Barwon
- Federal division(s): Parkes

Snakes Plain is a small rural locality approximately 11 kilometres (6.8 mi) south-west of Warren on the Oxley Highway in the local government area of Warren Shire, part of the Orana region of New South Wales, Australia.

At the 2016 census, Snakes Plain recorded a population of 9, with a median age of 20.

Despite the arid climate of the area, the Auscott Macquarie Valley irrigated cotton farm is located within the locality.

The Auscott siding, part of the Warren railway line, which serves the cotton processing facility, is located in Snakes Plain.

The topography is flat with a Köppen climate classification of BsK (Hot semi arid).
