= Collie, New South Wales =

Coordinates: 31°39′55″S 148°18′04″E

Collie New South Wales
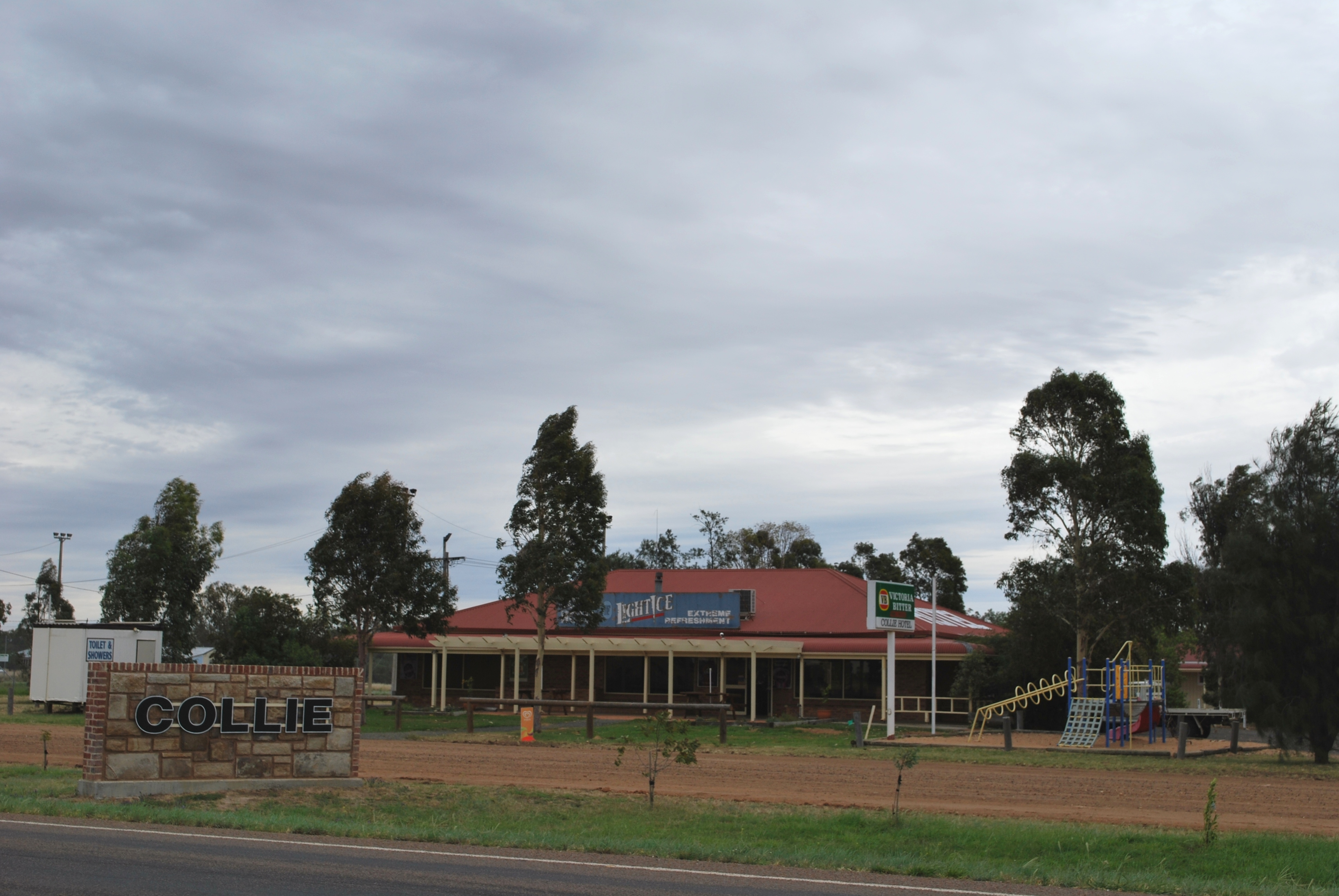
- Collie Hotel and welcome sign
- Population: 194 (2016 census)
- Postcode(s): 2827
- Location: 522 km (324 mi) NW of Sydney; 100 km (62 mi) N of Dubbo; 36 km (22 mi) W of Gilgandra
- LGA(s): Warren Shire
- County: Ewenmar
- State electorate(s): Barwon
- Federal division(s): Calare

Collie is a village and parish in central New South Wales, Australia. The town is located in Warren Shire and on the Oxley Highway, 522 kilometres (324 mi) north west of the state capital, Sydney. At the 2016 census, Collie and the surrounding area had a population of 194. The name, Collie, could have derived from an Aboriginal word meaning "water".
