= Woolartha, New South Wales =

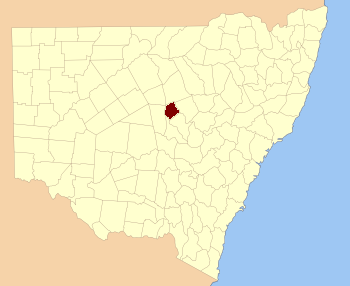
Oxley County NSW.

Woolartha Parish (Oxley County), New South Wales is a rural locality of Bogan Shire and a civil parish of Oxley County, New South Wales, a Cadastral divisions of New South Wales.

The parish is between the Belaringar Creek and the Main Western railway line just east of Nyngan.

The economy of the parish is based on broad acre agriculture of sheep, cattle and wheat.

The topography is flat with a Köppen climate classification of BsK (Hot semi arid).

The traditional owners of the area are the Wiradjuri people.
