= Thomas Egan (cricketer) =

Australian cricketer

Personal information
- Born: 5 October 1906; Warren, New South Wales, Australia
- Died: 29 November 1979 (aged 73); Double Bay, New South Wales, Australia
- Source: ESPNcricinfo, 26 December 2016

Thomas Egan (5 October 1906 – 29 November 1979) was an Australian cricketer. He played one first-class match for New South Wales in 1924/25.

== See also ==
- List of New South Wales representative cricketers
