= Mullengudgery, New South Wales =

Suburb in New South Wales, Australia

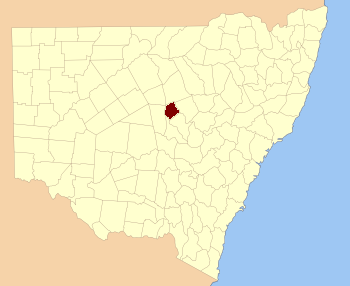
Oxley County NSW.

Mullengudgery, New South Wales is a rural locality of Bogan Shire and a civil parish of Oxley County, New South Wales, one of the cadastral divisions of the state.

The parish is on Belaringar Creek and the Main Western railway line just east of Nyngan and just north of the geographical centre of New South Wales. There is a disused railway halt at Mullengudgery. The former halt’s sign is retained along the railway line near a sheep station of the same name.

The economy of the parish is based on broad acre agriculture of sheep, cattle and wheat. The topography is flat with a Köppen climate classification of BsK (Hot semi arid).

The traditional owners of the area are the Wiradjuri. people.
