= Minore, New South Wales =

Minore
- Town
- Coordinates: 32°15′30″S 148°27′20″E
- Country: Australia
- State: New South Wales
- Region: Central West / Orana
- LGA: City of Dubbo

Government
  - State electorate: Dubbo
  - Federal division: Parkes

Population
  - Total: 194 (SAL 2021)
- Time zone: UTC+10 (AEST)
  - Summer (DST): UTC+11 (AEDT)
- Postcode: 2830
- County: Lincoln

Minore is a village, rural locality in the NSW county of Narromine and is in Dubbo City Council.

Minore is located 313 km (194 mi) northwest from Sydney, 16.0316 km (10 mi) east of Narromine and 19.6 km (12.2 mi) west of Dubbo, at lat -32° 14' 54" and long 147° 49' 04".

Minore is home to around 200 people, with the major industry being agriculture, forestry & fishing. Significant geographic features include the railway station at Minore village and Minore Falls on the Macquarie River.
