= Nevertire =

- Town
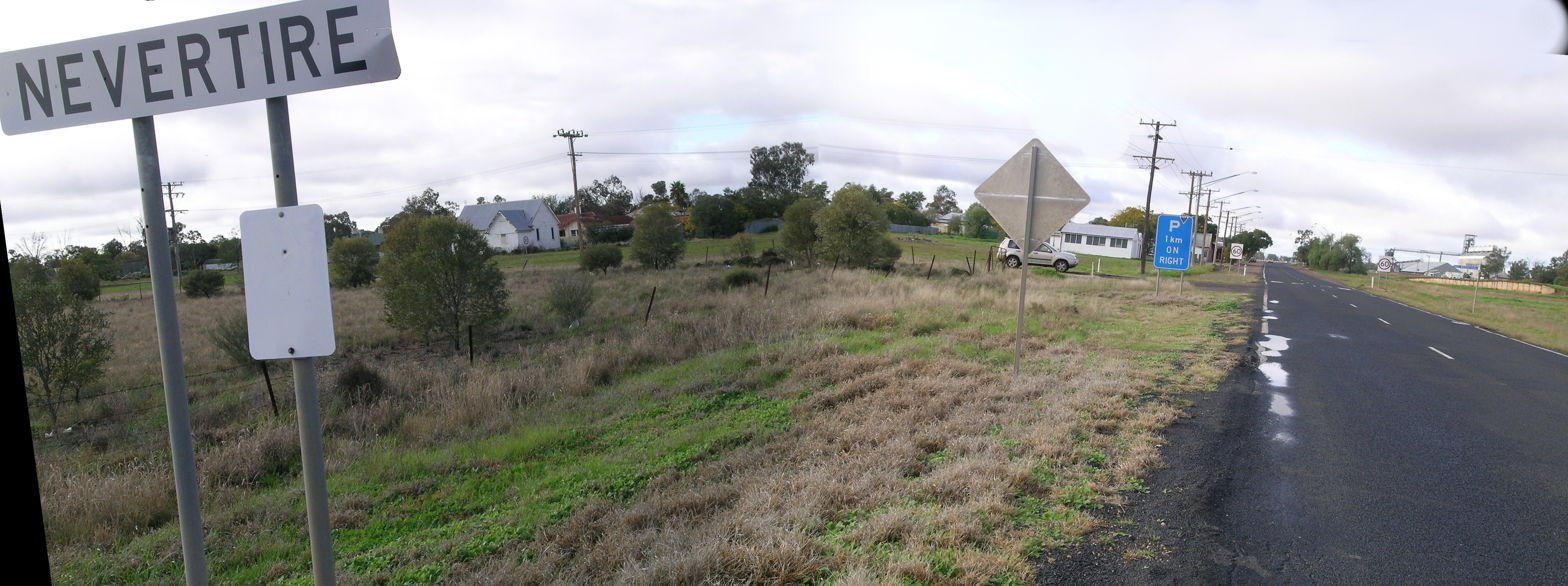
- Mitchell Highway, Nevertire

- Coordinates: 31°51′S 147°43′E
- Country: Australia
- State: New South Wales
- LGA: Warren Shire
- Location: 496 km (308 mi) NW of Sydney; 107 km (66 mi) NW of Dubbo; 78 km (48 mi) NW of Narromine; 19 km (12 mi) SW of Warren; 59 km (37 mi) SE of Nyngan

Government
  - State electorate: Barwon
  - Federal division: Parkes
- Elevation: 199 m (653 ft)

Population
  - Total: 225 (2011 census)
- Postcode: 2826
- County: Oxley

Nevertire is a rural village in New South Wales, Australia. It is located at the junction of the Mitchell Highway and the Oxley Highway, in Warren Shire. Nevertire is about 496 kilometres northwest of Sydney, 78 km north-west of Narromine and about 107 km from Dubbo. It is about 20 km south-west of Warren on the western end of the Oxley Highway. At the 2011 census, Nevertire had a population of 225 people.

== History ==
Originally the village was known as Warren Pond. The Main West railway line reached Nevertire in 1882 and the local pub was already trading before the town was surveyed in 1883. The town was devastated by a tornado on 28 December 1896. The town once had a railway station, operated by the State Rail Authority, but with the demise of country rail travel in the 1980s, the passenger services were replaced by a coach service run by CountryLink.

== Services ==
Nevertire is at the junction of the Main Western railway line to Nyngan and the branch line to Warren. The village is now served by three CountryLink Coach services: one to Bourke, one to Nyngan and one to Cobar/Broken Hill. Bourke Coach operates four times per week, the Broken Hill coach operates daily, and the Nyngan coach, which also serves Warren, operates four times per week.

There is a large grain handling facility on the railway line, operated by GrainCorp, and served by Pacific National trains. Local businesses also include a local pub (which is also the local post office), a cafe and store named The Rural Trader, welding services and a rural supplies outlet.

Nevertire Public school closed at the conclusion of the 2002 academic year, due to a lack of enrolments. Children in Nevertire now go to Warren Central School or St Mary's in Warren.

== Cultural references ==
Poet Henry Lawson wrote the poem Jack Dunn of Nevertire in 1892 and described the surrounding area in his poem The Great Gray Plain the following year.

The artist George Washington Lambert's 1899 painting Across the Black Soil Plains was inspired by Lambert's experiences in droving sheep, seeing "horse teams hauling heavily laden wool wagons across the bare, miry, flat lands of Snakes Plain from Warren to the railway station at Nevertire.
