= Warren, New South Wales =

Warren
- Town
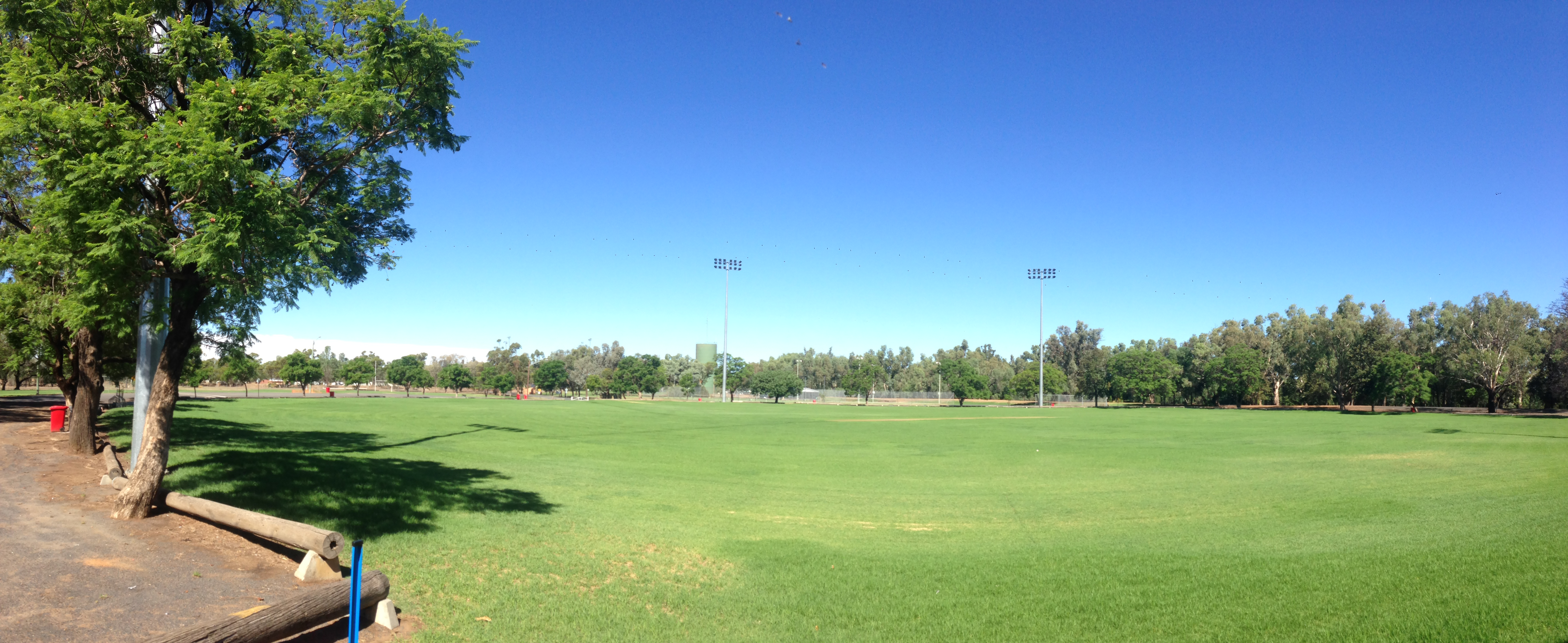
- Warren, NSW.

- Coordinates: 31°42′S 147°50′E
- Country: Australia
- State: New South Wales
- LGA: Warren Shire
- Location: 536 km (333 mi) NW of Sydney; 128 km (80 mi) NW of Dubbo; 85 km (53 mi) W of Gilgandra; 79 km (49 mi) E of Nyngan

Government
  - State electorate: Barwon
  - Federal division: Parkes
- Elevation: 198 m (650 ft)

Population
  - Total: 1,365 (2021 census)
- Postcode: 2824
- Mean max temp: 25.2 °C (77.4 °F)
- Mean min temp: 10.5 °C (50.9 °F)
- Annual rainfall: 515.8 mm (20.31 in)

Warren is a town in the Orana Region of New South Wales, Australia. It is located off the Mitchell Highway, 120 kilometres north west of Dubbo, and is the seat of the Warren Shire local government area. At the 2021 census, Warren had a population of 1,365. Warren is included in the Central West Slopes and Plains division of the Bureau of Meteorology forecasts.

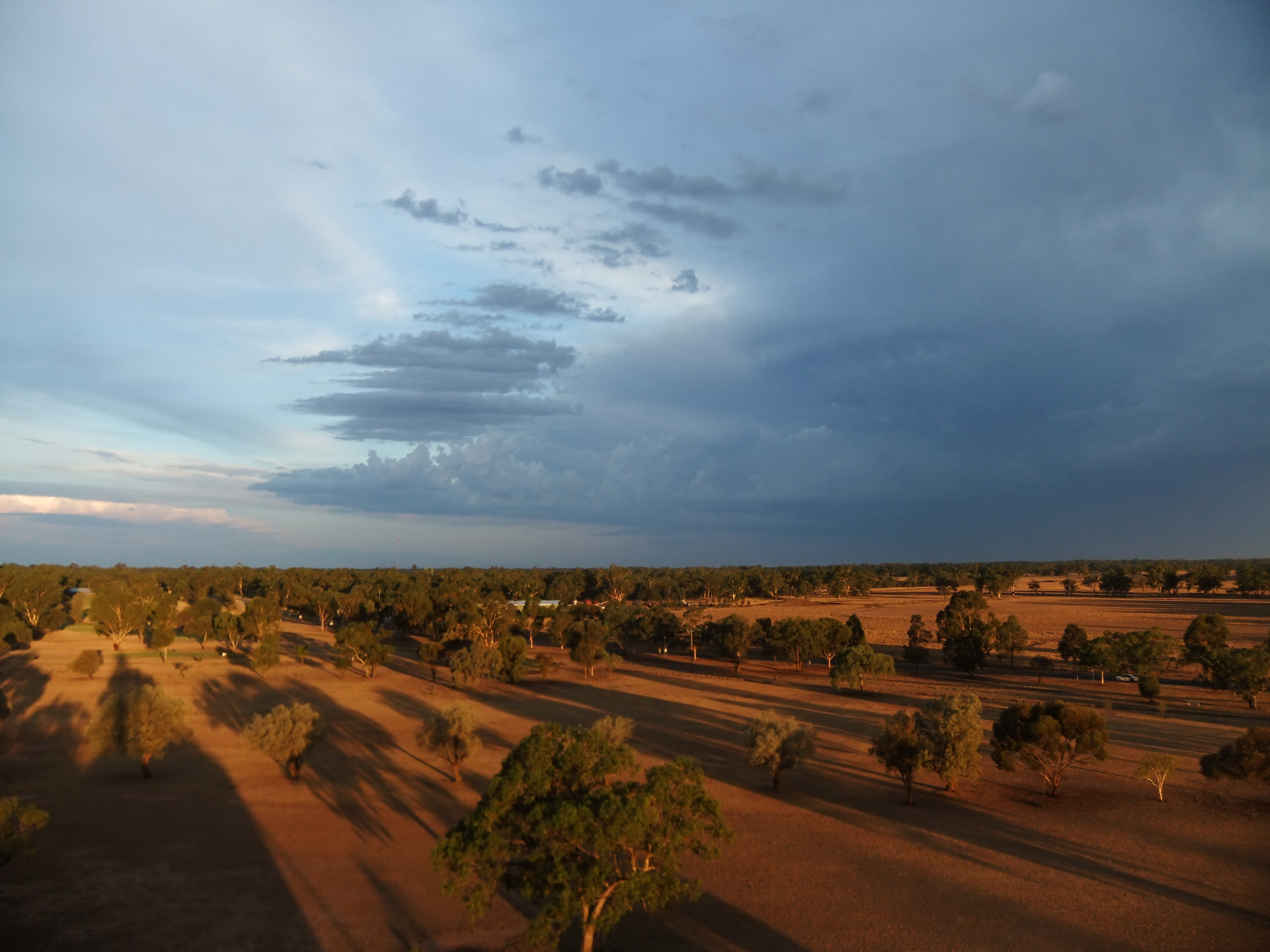
Looking to the East of Warren before entering town

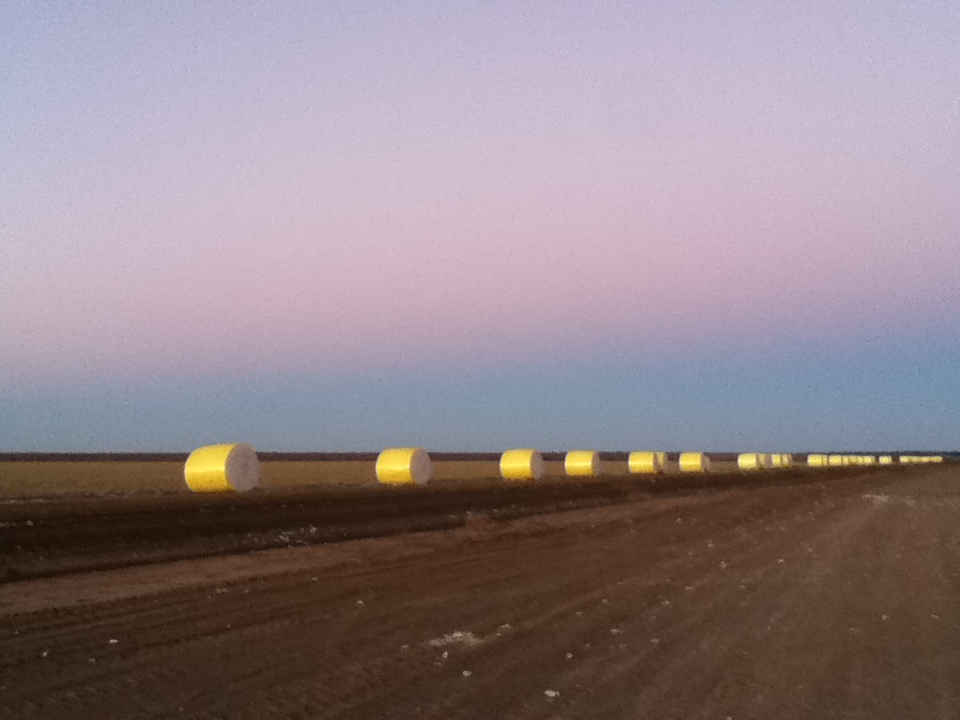
Purple sunrise over the white and gold cotton, taken from farm in Warren

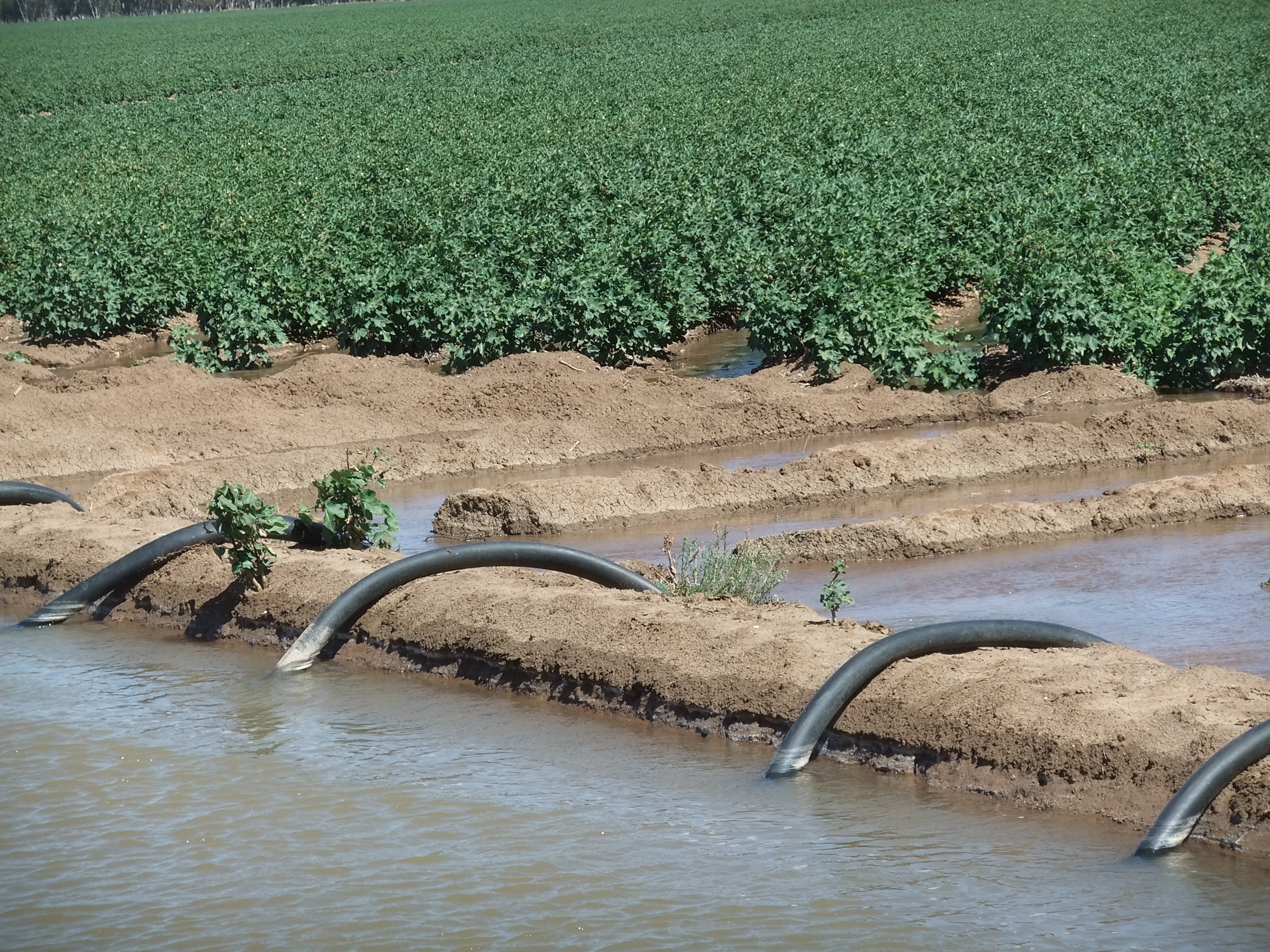
Channel Irrigation for Cotton Farmers in Warren, 3 inch pipes

== History ==
Before European settlement the area is said to have been occupied by the Ngiyambaa Aborigines. Explorer John Oxley camped on the present town site during his investigation of the Macquarie River in 1818. He noted an abundance of kangaroos and emus. Charles Sturt carried out further exploration in 1828–29. Cattle were grazing hereabouts by the late 1830s.

Warren station was established in 1845 by Thomas Readford and William Lawson, the son of explorer William Lawson who was a member of the first European party to breach the Blue Mountains in 1813. Some say the name derives from a local Aboriginal word, meaning "strong" or "substantial". Another theory is that it represents the adoption of a contemporary English term, "warren", meaning a game park - perhaps a reference to the picturesque riverside setting where the station hut was built (on what is now Macquarie Park) and to the large numbers of wildlife in the area.

A small police station was built near the hut to protect the new settlers from Aborigines but there being no disturbances the police soon moved on. The hut was located by the site of a river-crossing on the main route from Dubbo. Stockmen camped here in the bend by the river, adjacent to the Warren Hole (a natural and permanent waterhole), before crossing over on the gravel bar when the water was sufficiently low. A few stayed on and a site for a township was consequently surveyed in 1860 with land sales proceeding in 1861.

A post office opened in 1861, a bootmaker's shop (made of bark) in 1863, a store in 1866, a school in 1867, an Anglican church in 1873, the first courthouse in 1874 and the first bridge in 1875. However, the closer settlement did not really develop until the late 1880s.

Warren was incorporated as a municipality in 1895 and the Warren Weir was established in 1896. The town benefited greatly with the arrival of the railway in 1898, making it the railhead for an enormous area. In general terms, its prosperity rose and fell with the price of wool. In the 1920s the town developed quite substantially. In the Great Depression the economy shrank, expanding again in the postwar years. The eternal water shortage was greatly eased when Burrendong Dam was opened in 1967, allowing the development of cotton and produce.

== Economy ==
Warren is one of the main centres for the wool and cotton growing industries in New South Wales. It is a well-known area for merino breeding with local studs that include Haddon Rig and Egelabra.

== Population ==
Historical population
Year	Pop.	±%
1921	1,143	—
1933	1,567	+37.1%
1947	1,746	+11.4%
1954	1,828	+4.7%
1961	1,502	−17.8%
1966	1,678	+11.7%
1971	2,047	+22.0%
1976	2,077	+1.5%
1981	2,153	+3.7%
1986	2,030	−5.7%
1991	2,036	+0.3%
1996	1,909	−6.2%
2001	1,779	−6.8%
2006	1,654	−7.0%
2011	1,523	−7.9%
2016	1,530	+0.5%
2021	1,365	−10.8%
Source: Australian Bureau of Statistics data.

According to the 2021 census, the population of Warren was 1,365.

- Aboriginal and Torres Strait Islander people made up 21.2% of the population.
- 76.8% of people were born in Australia and 81.8% of people spoke only English at home
- The most common responses for religion were Anglican 27%, Catholic 25.3% and No Religion 19%.

== Geography ==
The Macquarie River runs through Warren.

=== Climate ===
Warren experiences a humid subtropical climate (Köppen: Cfa, Trewartha: Cfak), with hot summers and cool winters.

Climate data for Warren (Auscott), New South Wales, Australia (1968–1985 normals and extremes); 198 m AMSL
Month	Jan	Feb	Mar	Apr	May	Jun	Jul	Aug	Sep	Oct	Nov	Dec	Year
Record high °C (°F)	45.2 (113.4)	43.4 (110.1)	38.9 (102.0)	33.6 (92.5)	28.0 (82.4)	24.9 (76.8)	24.0 (75.2)	28.2 (82.8)	36.0 (96.8)	37.2 (99.0)	41.0 (105.8)	45.0 (113.0)	45.2 (113.4)
Mean daily maximum °C (°F)	33.5 (92.3)	32.3 (90.1)	30.0 (86.0)	25.7 (78.3)	20.4 (68.7)	16.7 (62.1)	16.3 (61.3)	18.3 (64.9)	21.2 (70.2)	25.8 (78.4)	29.8 (85.6)	33.3 (91.9)	25.3 (77.5)
Mean daily minimum °C (°F)	18.8 (65.8)	18.4 (65.1)	15.1 (59.2)	10.3 (50.5)	6.6 (43.9)	3.9 (39.0)	2.3 (36.1)	3.3 (37.9)	6.4 (43.5)	10.1 (50.2)	13.0 (55.4)	16.3 (61.3)	10.4 (50.7)
Record low °C (°F)	8.7 (47.7)	7.1 (44.8)	5.1 (41.2)	0.0 (32.0)	−1.1 (30.0)	−4.6 (23.7)	−6.4 (20.5)	−2.8 (27.0)	−1.5 (29.3)	2.4 (36.3)	2.9 (37.2)	7.1 (44.8)	−6.4 (20.5)
Average precipitation mm (inches)	79.1 (3.11)	61.6 (2.43)	34.2 (1.35)	32.5 (1.28)	45.5 (1.79)	30.4 (1.20)	35.0 (1.38)	25.4 (1.00)	36.8 (1.45)	60.8 (2.39)	38.7 (1.52)	29.7 (1.17)	509.7 (20.07)
Average precipitation days (≥ 1.0 mm)	5.4	4.8	4.1	3.0	3.6	4.1	4.5	3.6	4.2	4.8	3.5	3.6	49.2
Source: Australian Bureau of Meteorology (temperature, precipitation- 1968–1985 normals and extremes)

== Media ==
Warren is serviced by a weekly local newspaper, The Warren Star.

== Sport and recreation ==
Warren Pumas Rugby Club play in the Western Plains competition. The Warren Bulldogs are a member of the Castlereagh Cup rugby league competition but are currently in recess.

Warren's racecourse is home to the Warren Jockey Club, which holds four major race meetings each year.

The Far West Academy of Sport is based in Warren and is responsible for identifying talented young sportspeople across 42% of the state.

Warren Gun Club has been running since 1898 and continues to hold a number of feature events throughout the year, attracting sporting shooters from around New South Wales.

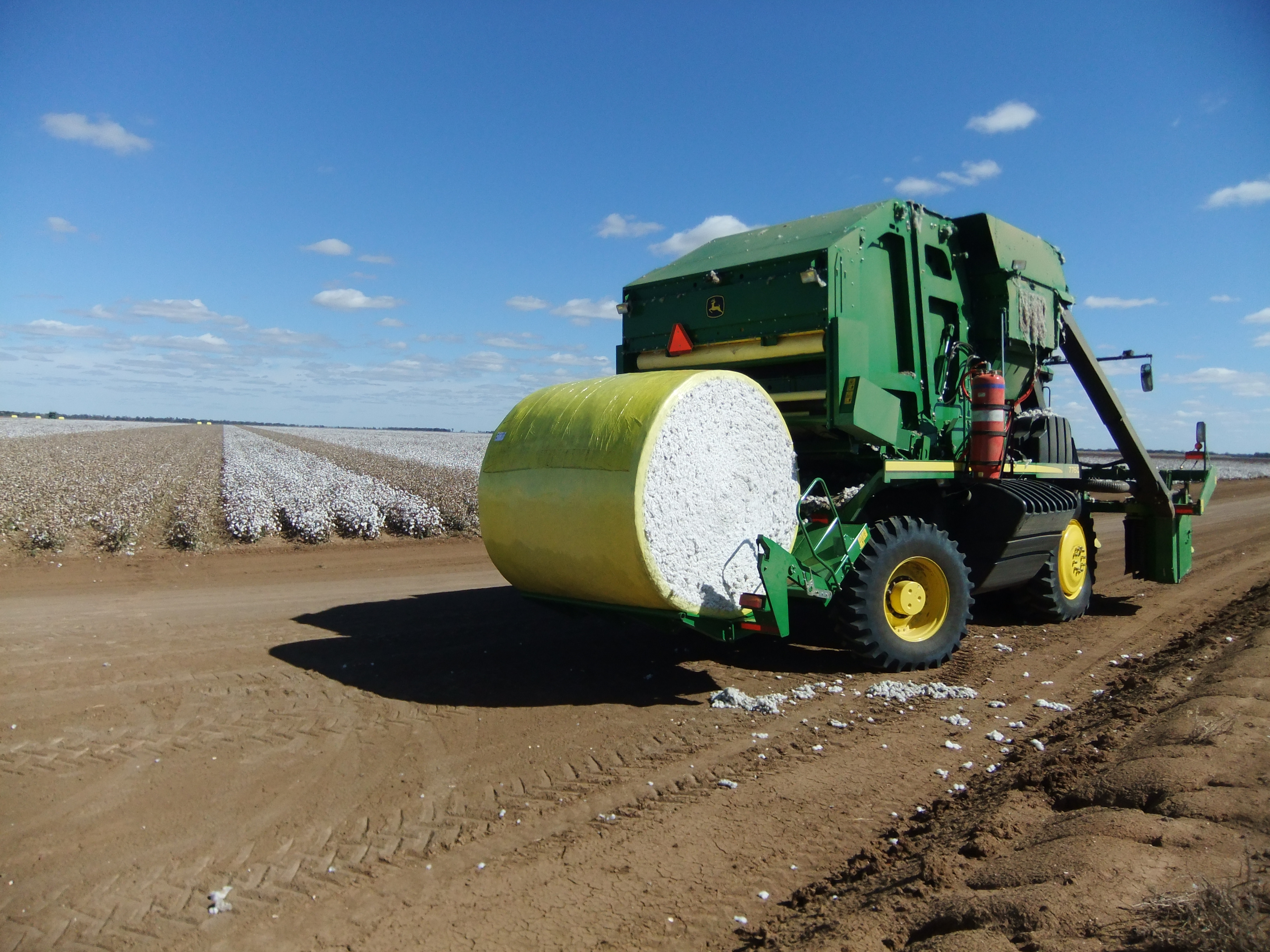
Round balers making it easier for farmers. Taken on farm In Warren NSW

== Notable people from Warren ==
- Warren Bardsley, former Australian test cricket captain
- Daniel Noonan, former rower and Olympic medalist
- Sharan Burrow, former president of the Australian Education Union, and former president of the ACTU.
- Ben McCalman, former Wallabies No.8 and Western Force player
- Greg Storer, country music singer
- Fletcher Hunt, NRL player for the Newcastle Knights
