= Warren Shire =

- Local government area
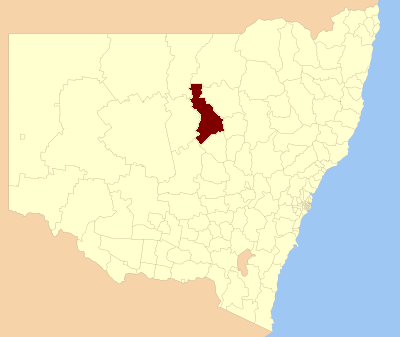
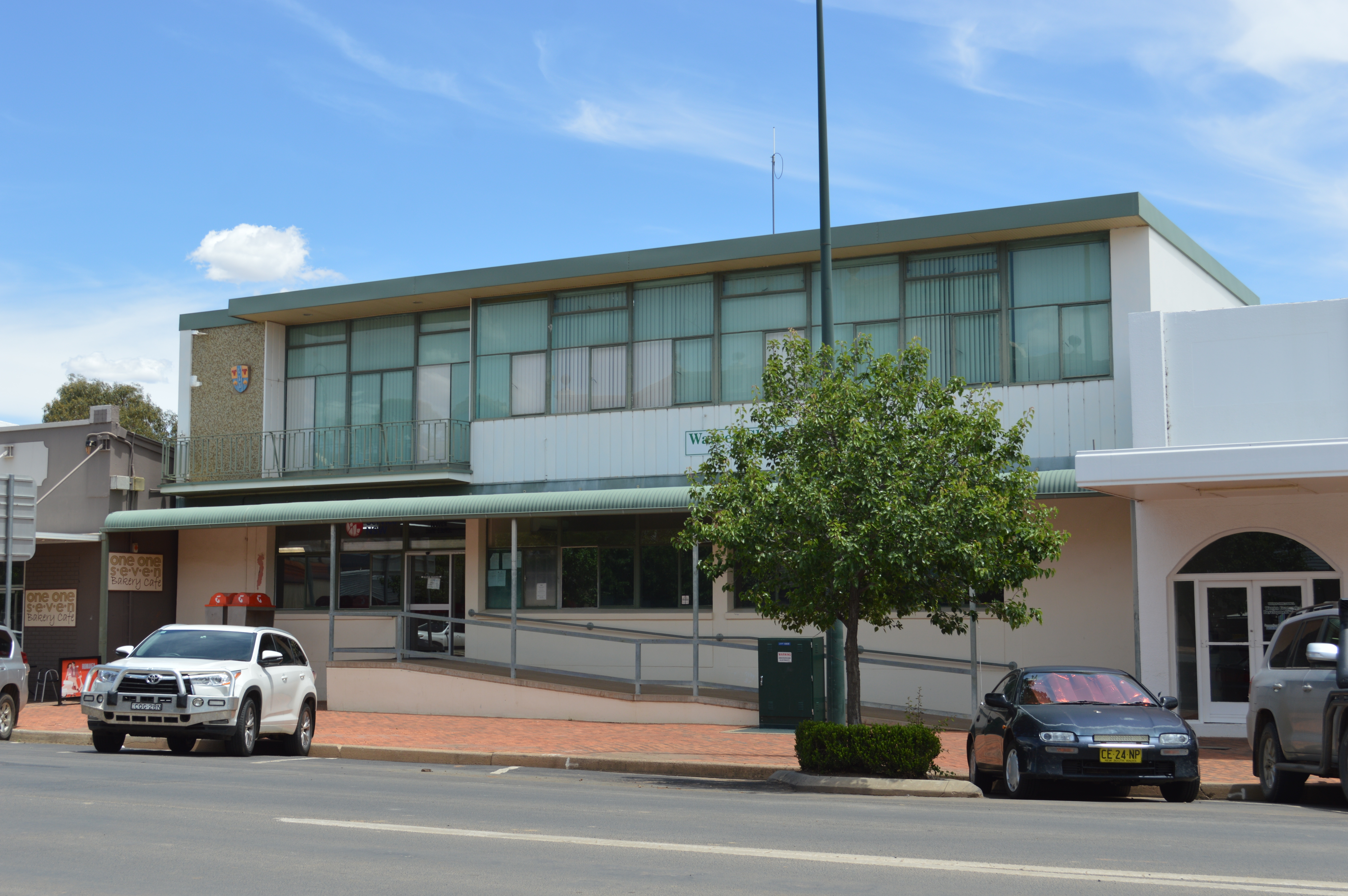
- Location in New South Wales Warren Shire Council Administration Office, 2017

- Interactive map of Warren Shire
- Coordinates: 31°42′S 147°50′E
- Country: Australia
- State: New South Wales
- Region: Orana
- Established: 1 January 1957
- Council seat: Warren

Government
  - Mayor: Greg Whiteley
  - State electorate: Barwon
  - Federal division: Parkes

Area
  - Total: 10,760 km^{2} (4,150 sq mi)

Population
  - Totals: 2,732 (2016 census); 2,745 (2018 est.)
  - Density: 0.26/km^{2} (0.67/sq mi)
- Website: Warren Shire
LGAs around Warren Shire
Brewarrina	Walgett	Coonamble
Bogan	Warren Shire	Gilgandra
Bogan	Lachlan	Narromine

Warren Shire is a local government area in the Orana region of New South Wales, Australia. The Shire is located adjacent to the Macquarie River and the Mitchell and Oxley Highways. The use of the area is mainly for wool and cotton growing.

The shire was formed on 1 January 1957 through the amalgamation of Marthaguy Shire with the Municipality of Warren. The shire includes the regional towns of Warren and Nevertire.

On 10 October 2024, Greg Whiteley was elected unopposed as the new mayor of Warren Shire Council, stepping into the role previously held by long-serving Mayor Milton Quigley.

== Demographics ==
Selected historical census data for Warren Shire local government area
Census year		2011	2016	2021
Population	Estimated residents on census night	2,758	▼2,732	▼2,550
Population	LGA rank in terms of size within New South Wales	125th	▲122nd	▼123rd
Population	% of New South Wales population	0.04%	0.04%	▼0.03%
Population	% of Australian population	0.01%	0.01%	0.01%
Cultural and language diversity				
Ancestry, top responses	Australian	38.1%	▼37.0%	▲40.9%
Ancestry, top responses	English	30.9%	▲31.8%	▲36.3%
Ancestry, top responses	Aboriginal Australians	n/c	n/c	▲13.9%
Ancestry, top responses	Irish	11.5%	▼9.7%	▲13.8%
Ancestry, top responses	Scottish	7.6%	▼7.4%	▲10.4%
Language, top responses (other than English)	Filipino	n/c	▲0.1%	▲0.5%
Language, top responses (other than English)	German	n/c	▲0.3%	▲0.4%
Language, top responses (other than English)	Afrikaans	0.3%	▼0.2%	▲0.4%
Language, top responses (other than English)	Malayalam	n/c	n/c	▲0.2%
Language, top responses (other than English)	Bengali	n/c	n/c	▲0.2%
Religious affiliation				
Religious affiliation, top responses	Catholic	36.9%	▼35.3%	▼30.3%
Religious affiliation, top responses	Anglican	35.8%	▼27.7%	▼26.6%
Religious affiliation, top responses	No Religion	7.4%	▲11.6%	▲18.8%
Religious affiliation, top responses	Not stated	n/c	▲11.7%	▲12.0%
Religious affiliation, top responses	Presbyterian and Reformed	8.7%	▼8.4%	▼6.6%
Median weekly incomes				
Personal income	Median weekly personal income	A$498	A$649	A$744
Personal income	% of Australian median income	86.3%	▲98.0%	▼92.4%
Family income	Median weekly family income	A$1128	A$1468	A$1743
Family income	% of Australian median income	76.2%	▲84.7%	▼82.2%
Household income	Median weekly household income	A$874	A$1104	A$1321
Household income	% of Australian median income	70.8%	▲76.8%	▼75.7%

== Council ==
=== Current composition and election method ===
Warren Shire Council is composed of twelve councillors elected proportionally as four separate wards, each electing three councillors. All councillors are elected for a fixed four-year term of office. The mayor is elected by the councillors at the first meeting of the council.

== Election results ==
=== 2024 ===
2024 New South Wales local elections: Warren
Party	Votes	%	Swing	Seats	Change
Independent				11	▼1
Independent National	0	0.0	+0.0	1	▲1
Formal votes					
Informal votes					
Total				12	
Registered voters / turnout					

== See also ==
- List of local government areas in New South Wales
