= Terrigal Parish (Gregory County), New South Wales =

Civil Parish in New South Wales

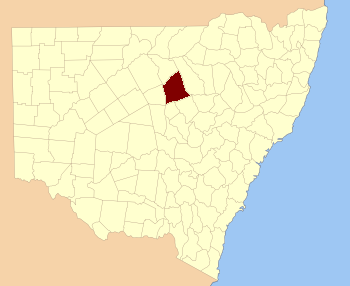
Gregory County

Terrigal Parish is a civil Parish of Gregory County in New South Wales.

The parish is on Marthaguy Creek on the eastern boundary of the Macquarie Marshes Nature Reserve.
