= Macquarie Marshes =

Wetland in New South Wales, Australia

Coordinates: 30°55′55″S 147°37′44″E

Designations

Ramsar Wetland
- Official name: Macquarie Marshes
- Designated: 1 August 1986
- Reference no.: 337

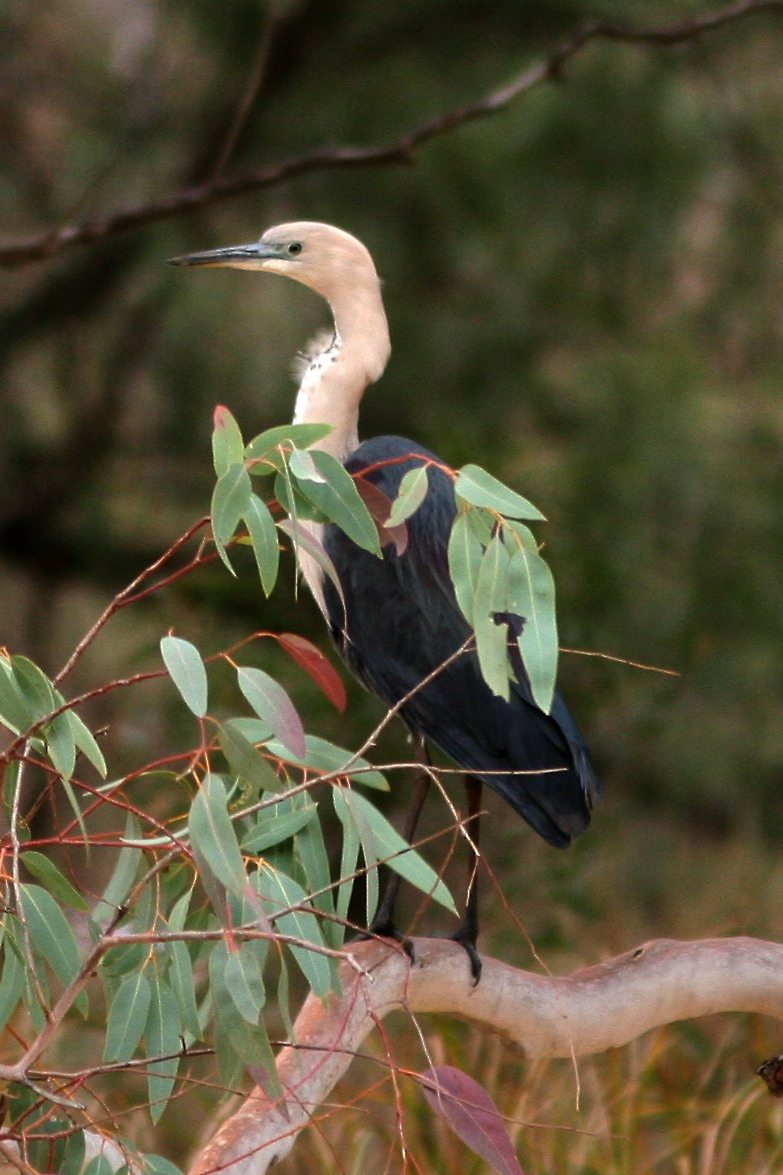
The marshes are an important area for white-necked herons.

The Macquarie Marshes comprise the wetlands associated with the floodplains of the Macquarie River and its tributaries, in northern New South Wales, Australia. The Macquarie River and the marshes eventually drain into the Darling River. The marshes are important as a breeding site for waterbirds, especially in the aftermath of major floods.

== Description ==
The marshes consist of a system of freshwater channels and streams, some of which are permanent following construction of water regulation devices, with semi-permanent and ephemeral swamps and floodplains. The extent of the marshes varies according to the extent of flooding. The historical maximum flooding of 4,780 square kilometres (1,850 sq mi) was recorded in the mid-1950s; since then flooding has become both less frequent and less extensive. Most of the area covered by the marshes is used as rangeland or pasture; some 10% is protected in the Macquarie Marshes Nature Reserve. Among the variety of vegetation types supported by the marshes are river red gum forest and woodland, extensive beds of common reed, and meadows of water couch. Daily temperatures in the area vary from about 4 °C (39 °F) in July to 36 °C (97 °F) in January, with an average annual rainfall of 300 millimetres (12 in) to 400 millimetres (16 in).

== Fauna ==
The marshes support at least eight native and six introduced mammals, with 56 species of reptile, 15 species of frog and 16 species of freshwater fish.

== Birds ==
The Macquarie Marshes have been identified by BirdLife International as a 2378 km^{2} Important Bird Area (IBA), defined by the maximum extent of the 1990 floods. Among over 200 species of birds recorded, the marshes have supported over 1% of the world population of the endangered Australasian bittern, as well as white-necked herons, intermediate egrets, nankeen night-herons, Australian white and straw-necked ibises, and sharp-tailed sandpipers. The IBA also supports a population of diamond firetails. Other birds recorded in substantial numbers include glossy ibises, great and little egrets, royal spoonbills, Pacific black ducks and Caspian terns. Australian painted snipes, superb parrots, painted and pied honeyeaters have been recorded in the IBA.
