= Gregory County, New South Wales =

Gregory New South Wales
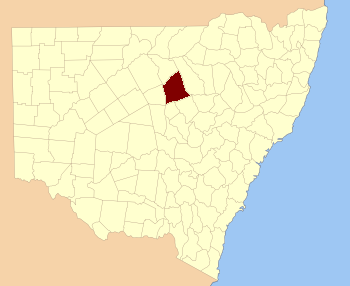
- Location in New South Wales
Lands administrative divisions around Gregory:
Cowper	Clyde	Leichhardt
Canbelego	Gregory	Gowen
Flinders	Oxley	Ewenmar

Gregory County is one of the 141 cadastral divisions of New South Wales. It is bordered by Bogan River in the west, and includes the area to the northeast of Nyngan. It includes the Macquarie Marshes Nature Reserve, and the town of Quambone.

Gregory County was named in honour of surveyor-general and explorer, Sir Augustus Charles Gregory.

== Parishes within this county ==
Parish	Local government area	Coordinates (approximate centre of parish)
Bannah	Bogan Shire	31°19′54″S 147°18′04″E
Bebrue	Warren Shire	31°15′54″S 147°44′04″E
Belar	Warren Shire	30°55′54″S 147°18′04″E
Belarbone	Bogan Shire	31°17′54″S 147°06′04″E
Bena	Bogan Shire	31°17′54″S 147°18′04″E
Bergo	Bogan Shire	31°27′54″S 147°12′04″E
Bibbejibbery	Warren Shire	31°03′54″S 147°40′04″E
Billabulla	Warren Shire	31°27′54″S 147°46′04″E
Birrimba	Bogan Shire	31°15′54″S 147°10′04″E
Blairmont	Coonamble Shire	30°41′54″S 147°38′04″E
Bokamore	Coonamble Shire	30°57′54″S 147°58′04″E
Boomagrill	Bogan Shire	31°27′54″S 147°24′04″E
Boonun	Bogan Shire	31°25′54″S 147°18′04″E
Bourbah	Coonamble Shire	31°15′54″S 148°12′04″E
Buckinguy	Warren Shire	30°55′54″S 147°26′04″E
Bulgala	Bogan Shire	31°09′54″S 147°14′04″E
Bulgeraga	Warren Shire	30°57′54″S 147°40′04″E
Buttabone	Warren Shire	31°19′54″S 147°34′04″E
Canonba	Bogan Shire	31°23′54″S 147°22′04″E
Canonba North	Bogan Shire	31°19′00″S 147°22′43″E
Carwell	Coonamble Shire	30°51′54″S 148°46′04″E
Colane	Bogan Shire	31°13′54″S 147°16′04″E
Collyburl	Warren Shire	31°25′54″S 147°48′04″E
Dreewa	Bogan Shire	31°23′54″S 147°28′04″E
Dryburgh	Warren Shire	31°21′54″S 147°50′04″E
Duffity	Warren Shire	31°11′04″S 147°39′51″E
Dynong	Coonamble Shire	30°37′54″S 147°40′04″E
Embie	Coonamble Shire	31°09′54″S 147°58′04″E
Enaweena	Warren Shire	31°27′54″S 147°28′04″E
Eula	Bogan Shire	30°58′55″S 147°08′41″E
Eulamoga	Bogan Shire	31°12′52″S 147°22′14″E
Gandymungydel	Coonamble Shire	31°07′54″S 148°08′04″E
Gardiner	Warren Shire	30°43′54″S 147°32′04″E
Geerigan	Warren Shire	31°25′54″S 147°32′04″E
Geralgumbone	Warren Shire	30°57′54″S 147°34′04″E
Gerar	Bogan Shire	31°18′35″S 147°13′37″E
Gerwa	Coonamble Shire	30°57′54″S 147°50′04″E
Gilgoen	Bogan Shire	31°19′14″S 147°27′06″E
Girralong	Coonamble Shire	30°40′31″S 147°48′44″E
Goobabone	Bogan Shire	31°21′52″S 147°10′34″E
Goolagoola	Warren Shire	31°08′38″S 147°24′13″E
Gooribun	Warren Shire	30°47′54″S 147°24′04″E
Graddell	Bogan Shire	31°08′02″S 147°07′55″E
Gradgery	Warren Shire	31°13′03″S 147°54′45″E
Grahway	Warren Shire	31°05′54″S 147°26′04″E
Gunnell	Bogan Shire	31°08′24″S 147°12′28″E
Haddon Rig	Warren Shire	31°25′54″S 147°56′04″E
Holybon	Warren Shire	31°25′28″S 147°45′10″E
Inglega	Warren Shire	31°17′54″S 147°48′04″E
Mara	Warren Shire	30°57′54″S 147°22′04″E
Marbella	Warren Shire	30°57′54″S 147°20′04″E
Marebone	Warren Shire	31°19′26″S 147°42′52″E
Marinebone	Bogan Shire	31°25′54″S 147°24′04″E
Marthaguy	Warren Shire	31°09′15″S 147°54′55″E
Mellerstain	Warren Shire	31°19′54″S 147°58′04″E
Melrose	Warren Shire	31°21′54″S 147°56′04″E
Merri	Coonamble Shire	30°47′54″S 147°46′04″E
Merrimba	Warren Shire	31°05′54″S 147°52′04″E
Merrinele	Warren Shire	31°09′54″S 147°48′04″E
Mobala	Coonamble Shire	30°57′54″S 147°56′04″E
Mount Foster	Warren Shire	31°17′54″S 147°28′04″E
Mumblebone	Warren Shire	31°25′53″S 147°39′31″E
Narrabone	Coonamble Shire	30°53′54″S 147°50′04″E
Narragon	Bogan Shire	31°04′00″S 147°09′53″E
Neinby	Coonamble Shire	
Ninia	Warren Shire	30°51′54″S 147°40′04″E
Noonbah	Warren Shire	31°05′54″S 147°46′04″E
Northcote	Warren Shire	31°11′21″S 147°33′32″E
Pentagon	Warren Shire	31°09′19″S 147°19′23″E
Pullingarwarina	Coonamble Shire	30°45′54″S 147°36′04″E
Quabothoo	Coonamble Shire	30°35′54″S 147°48′04″E
Quambone	Coonamble Shire	30°52′13″S 147°54′07″E
Quilbone	Coonamble Shire	30°39′54″S 147°44′04″E
Quondong	Coonamble Shire	30°49′54″S 147°52′04″E
Sandridge	Warren Shire	31°01′54″S 147°46′04″E
Stanhope	Warren Shire	31°15′16″S 147°29′02″E
Tailby	Coonamble Shire	31°15′23″S 148°17′07″E
Tameribundy	Coonamble Shire	31°13′54″S 148°08′04″E
Terrigal	Coonamble Shire	30°47′54″S 147°42′04″E
The Mole	Warren Shire	30°49′41″S 147°28′20″E
Tongamba	Warren Shire	31°17′54″S 147°56′04″E
Warrigal	Warren Shire	30°51′54″S 147°18′04″E
Waughandry	Warren Shire	30°57′54″S 147°14′04″E
Weenculling	Coonamble Shire	30°55′54″S 147°46′04″E
Willie	Warren Shire	30°51′54″S 147°26′04″E
Wingebar	Warren Shire	31°13′54″S 147°58′04″E
Woolagoola	Warren Shire	31°03′54″S 147°14′04″E
Wullamgambone	Warren Shire	30°53′54″S 147°34′04″E
Wundabungay	Warren Shire	30°57′54″S 147°26′04″E
Yarrawell	Warren Shire	31°05′54″S 147°36′04″E
Yhababong	Bogan Shire	31°25′47″S 147°13′14″E
