= Gardiner Parish, New South Wales =

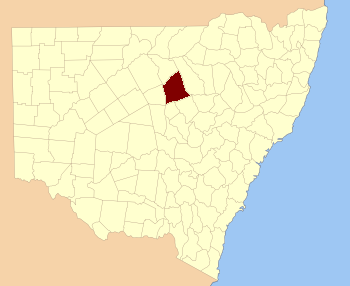
Gregory County

Gardiner Parish is a civil parish of Gregory County in New South Wales.

The parish is on the Macquarie Marshes Nature Reserve.
