= Mumblebone, New South Wales =

Rural locality in New South Wales

Mumblebone, New South Wales is a rural locality of Warren Shire and a civil parish of Gregory County, New South Wales, a Cadastral divisions of New South Wales.

The parish is on the Macquarie River north of Nyngan.
