= Billabulla, New South Wales =

Billabulla, New South Wales is a rural locality of Warren Shire and a civil parish of Gregory County, New South Wales, a Cadastral divisions of New South Wales.

The parish is on the Macquarie River north east of Nyngan.
