= Gilgoen, New South Wales =

Gilgoen Parish is a civil parish of Gregory County, New South Wales.

The parish is in Bogan Shire located at 31°19′14″S 147°27′06″E north of Nyngan, on Crooked Creek. The path of totality for the solar eclipse of October 14, 2042 will pass over the parish.
