= Australian white ibis =

- In South Australia

Conservation status
- Least Concern (IUCN 3.1)

Scientific classification
- Kingdom: Animalia
- Phylum: Chordata
- Class: Aves
- Order: Pelecaniformes
- Family: Threskiornithidae
- Genus: Threskiornis
- Species: T. molucca

Binomial name
- Threskiornis molucca (Cuvier, 1829)

Subspecies
- T. m. moluccus (Australasian white ibis); T. m. pygmaeus (Solomons white ibis)

Synonyms
- Threskiornis moluccus

Species of bird

The Australian white ibis (Threskiornis molucca) is a wading bird of the family Threskiornithidae. It is widespread across much of Australia. It has a predominantly white plumage with a bare, black head, long downcurved bill, and black legs. While it is closely related to the African sacred ibis, the Australian white ibis is a native Australian bird. Contrary to urban myth, it is not a feral species introduced to Australia by people, and it does not come from Egypt.

Historically rare in urban areas, the Australian white ibis has established in urban areas of the east coast in increasing numbers since the late 1970s; it is now commonly seen in Wollongong, Sydney, Melbourne, Adelaide, Darwin, the Gold Coast, Brisbane and Townsville. In recent years, the bird has also become increasingly common in Perth, Western Australia, and surrounding towns in south-western Australia. Populations have disappeared from natural breeding areas such as the Macquarie Marshes in northern New South Wales. Management plans have been introduced to control problematic urban populations in Sydney.

== Etymology ==
Due to their commonness in urban areas, and their habit of rummaging in outside garbage, the species has acquired a variety of names, including "tip turkey" and "bin chicken".

== Taxonomy ==
It was initially described by Georges Cuvier in 1829 as Ibis molucca. It is considered part of a superspecies complex with the sacred ibis (T. aethiopicus) of Africa, and the black-headed ibis (T. melanocephalus) of Asia. Its status in the complex has vacillated over the years. Many older guidebooks referred to the bird as a species, T. molucca, until a comprehensive review of plumage patterns by Holyoak in 1970. Holyoak noted the three species' similarities and that the Australian taxon resembled T. aethiopicus in adult plumage and T. melanocephalus in juvenile plumage. He proposed that they all be considered part of a single species, T. aethiopicus. This was generally accepted by the scientific community until Lowe and Richards's assessment of plumage in 1991. They again recommended the recognition of molucca at species level. This was followed by a chromosome study, which highlighted each of the three species having a different karyotype. The Australian white ibis has been considered a full species by most authorities since then.

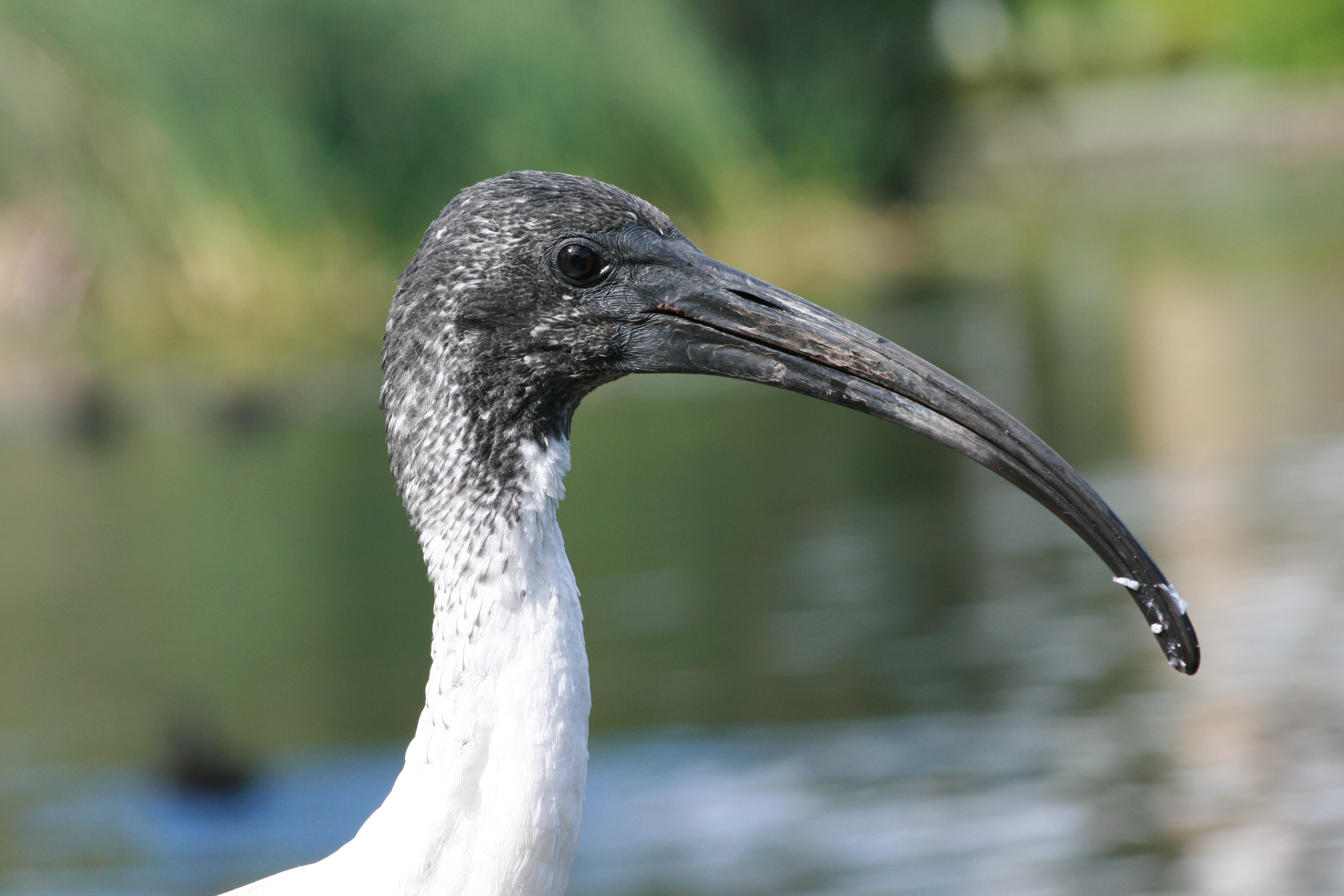
Juvenile

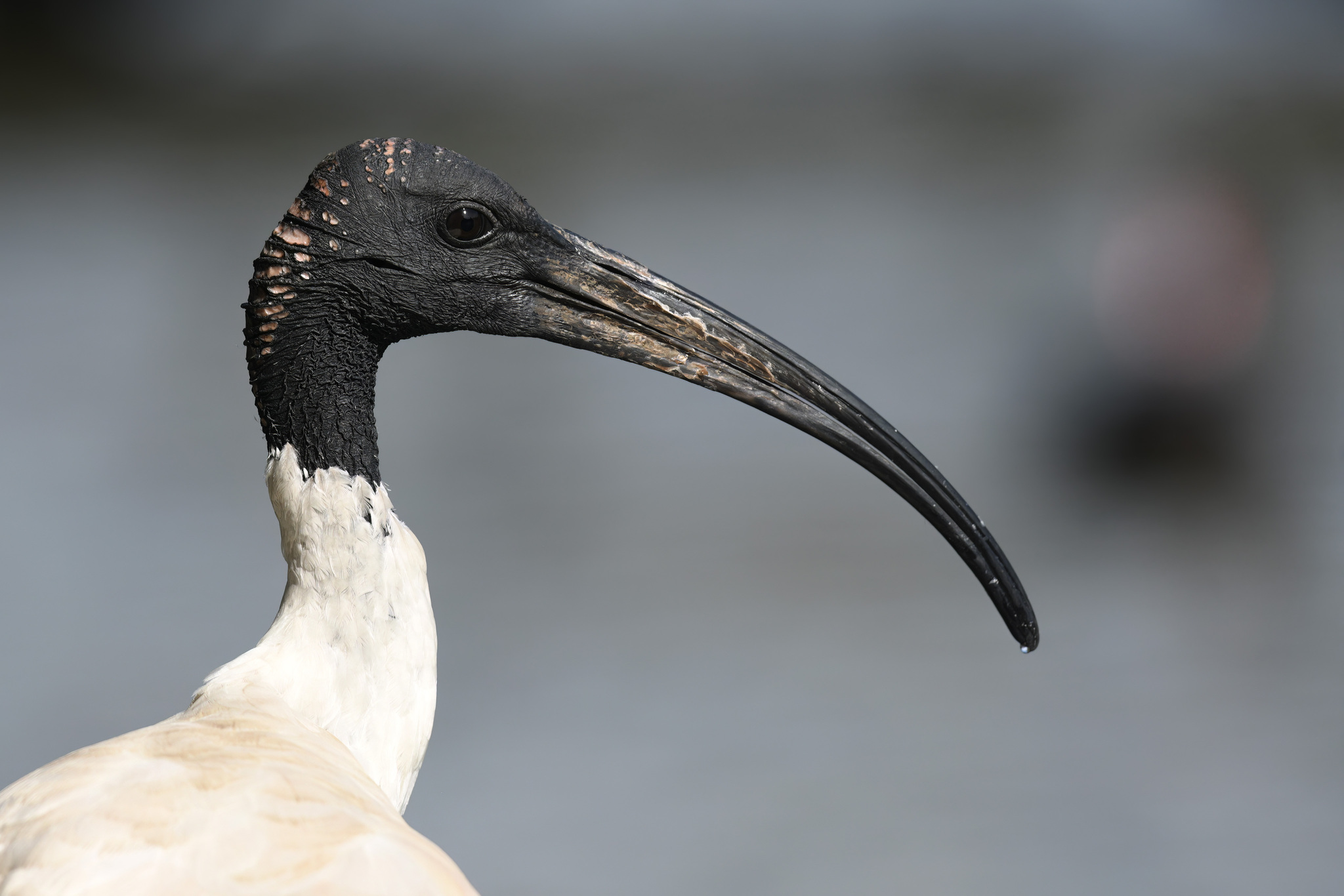
Adult

=== Subspecies ===
Two subspecies are recognised:

- T. m. molucca of eastern Malesia and Australia, is the nominate subspecies.
- T. m. pygmaeus (Solomons white ibis), known locally as the tagoa, is a dwarf form found on the Solomon Islands that has been considered a separate species (as Threskiornis pygmaeus) at times. It is found only on Rennell and Bellona Islands, in the Solomon Islands of Melanesia, in the south-west Pacific Ocean.

== Description ==
The Australian white ibis is a fairly large ibis species, around 65–75 cm (26–30 in) long and has a bald black head and neck and a long black downcurved beak, measuring over 16.7 cm (6.6 in) in the male, and under in the female. There is some sexual dimorphism in size, as the slightly heavier male weighs 1.7–2.5 kg (3.7–5.5 lb) compared to the 1.4–1.9 kg (3.1–4.2 lb) female. As a comparison, the American white ibis generally attains 1 kg (2.2 lb) in weight. The body plumage is white, although it may become brown-stained. Inner secondary plumes are displayed as lacy black "tail" feathers. The upper tail becomes yellow when the bird is breeding. The legs and feet are dark and red skin is visible on the underside of the wing. Immature birds have shorter bills. The head and neck are feathered in juveniles.

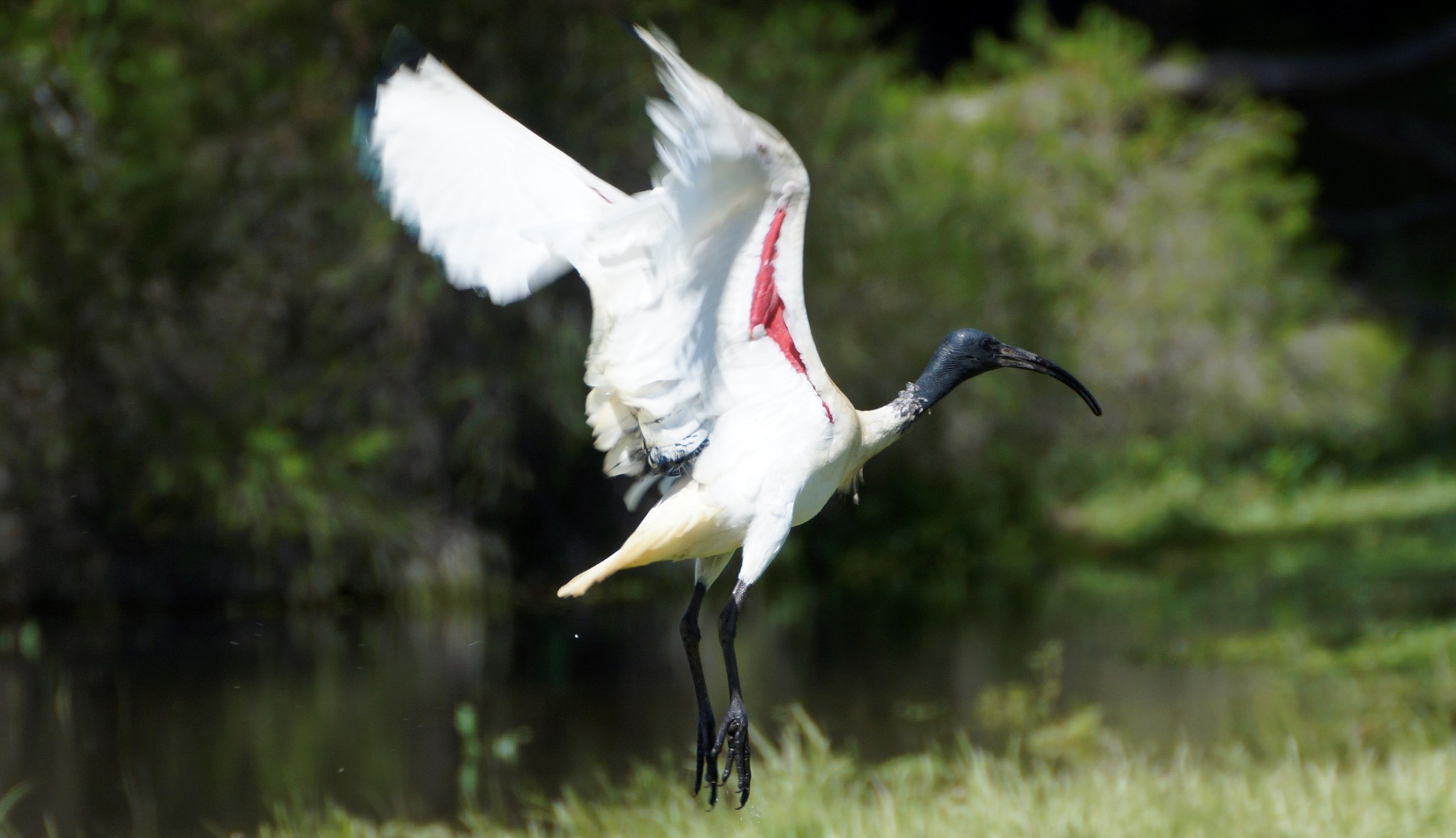
Showing red skin under the wings

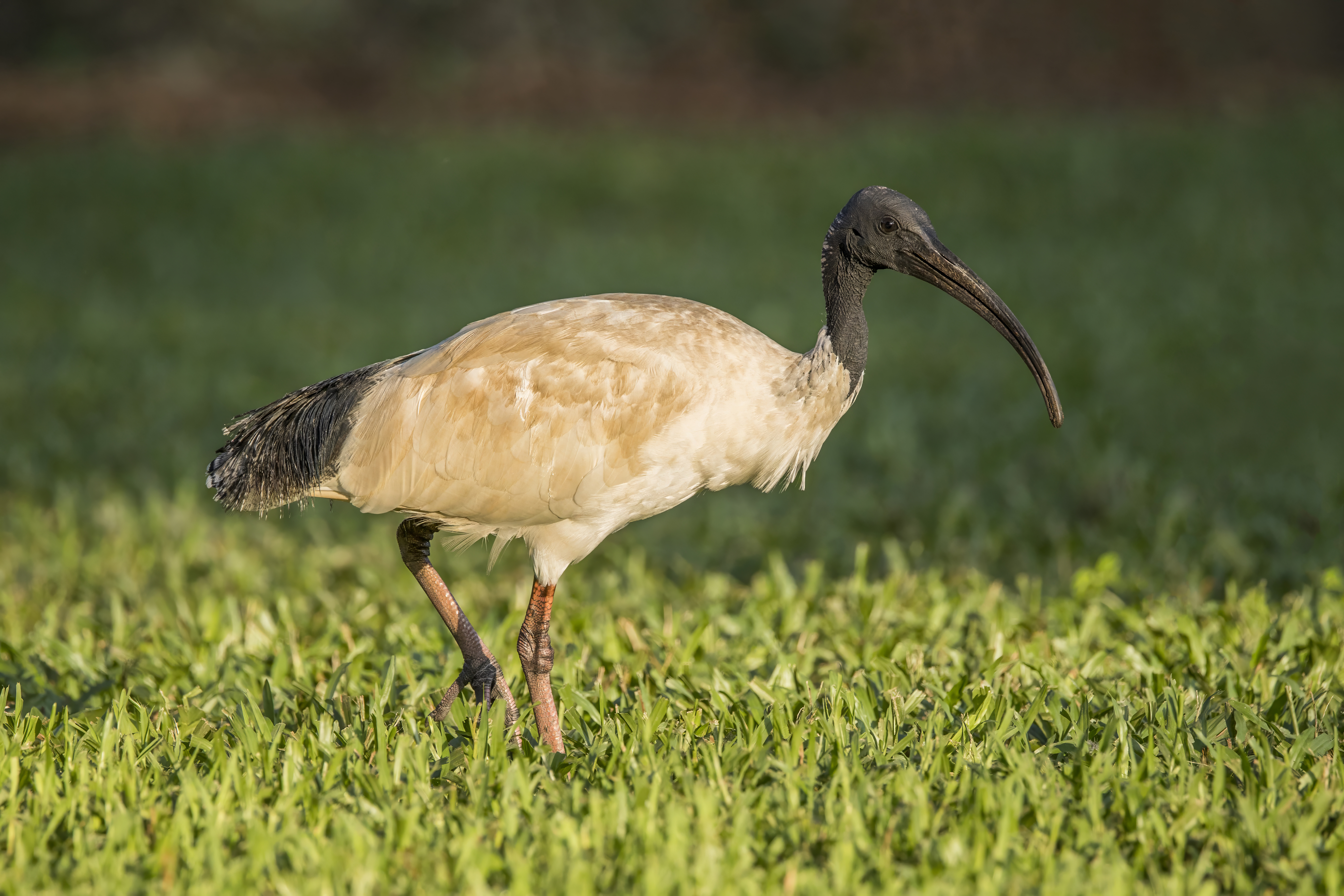
adult with stained feathers

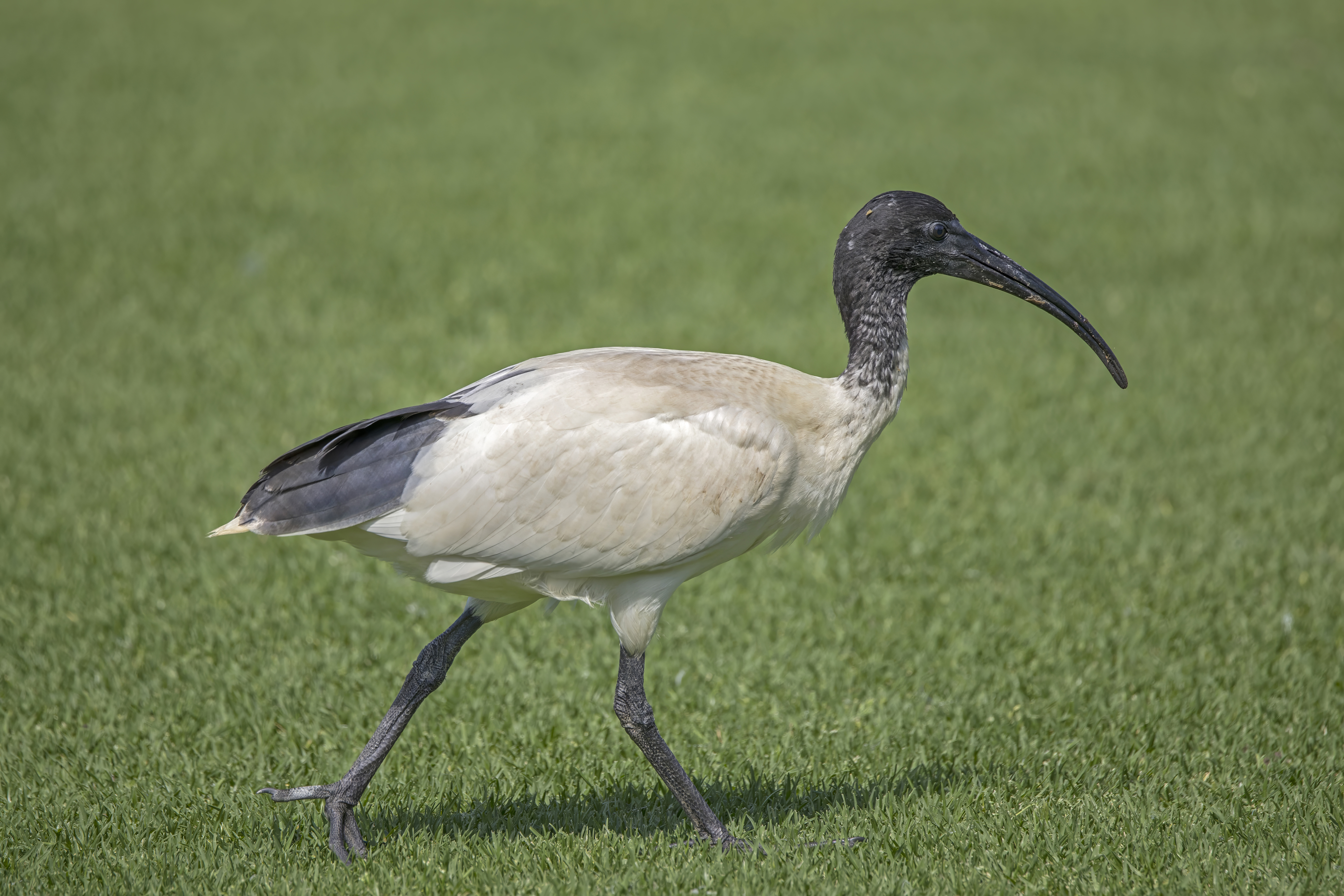
Juvenile, at the Royal Botanic Garden in Sydney

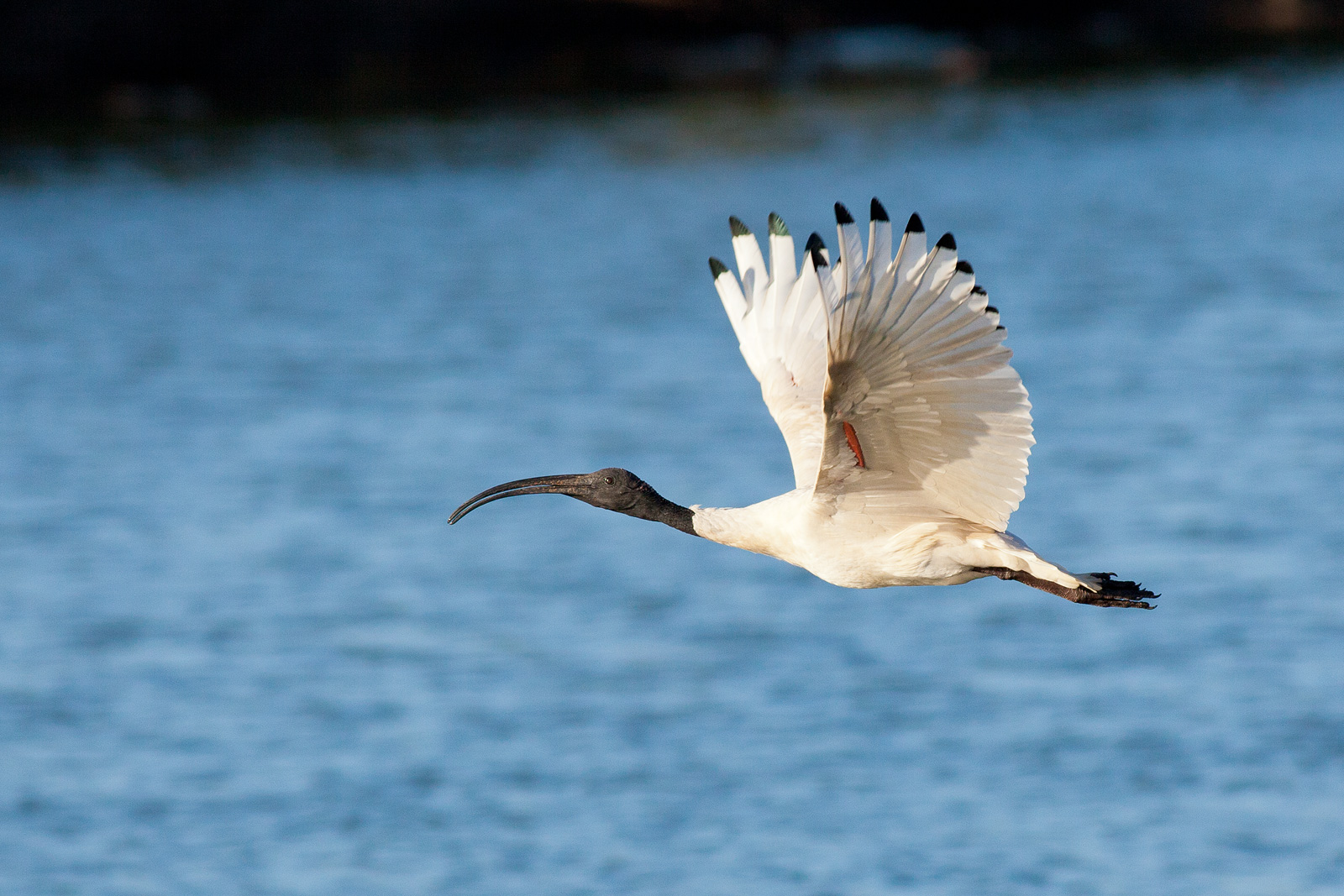
In flight, red skin visible under wings

The call is a long croak.

The Australian white ibis reaches sexual maturity in three years, and can reach twenty-eight years of age.

== Distribution ==
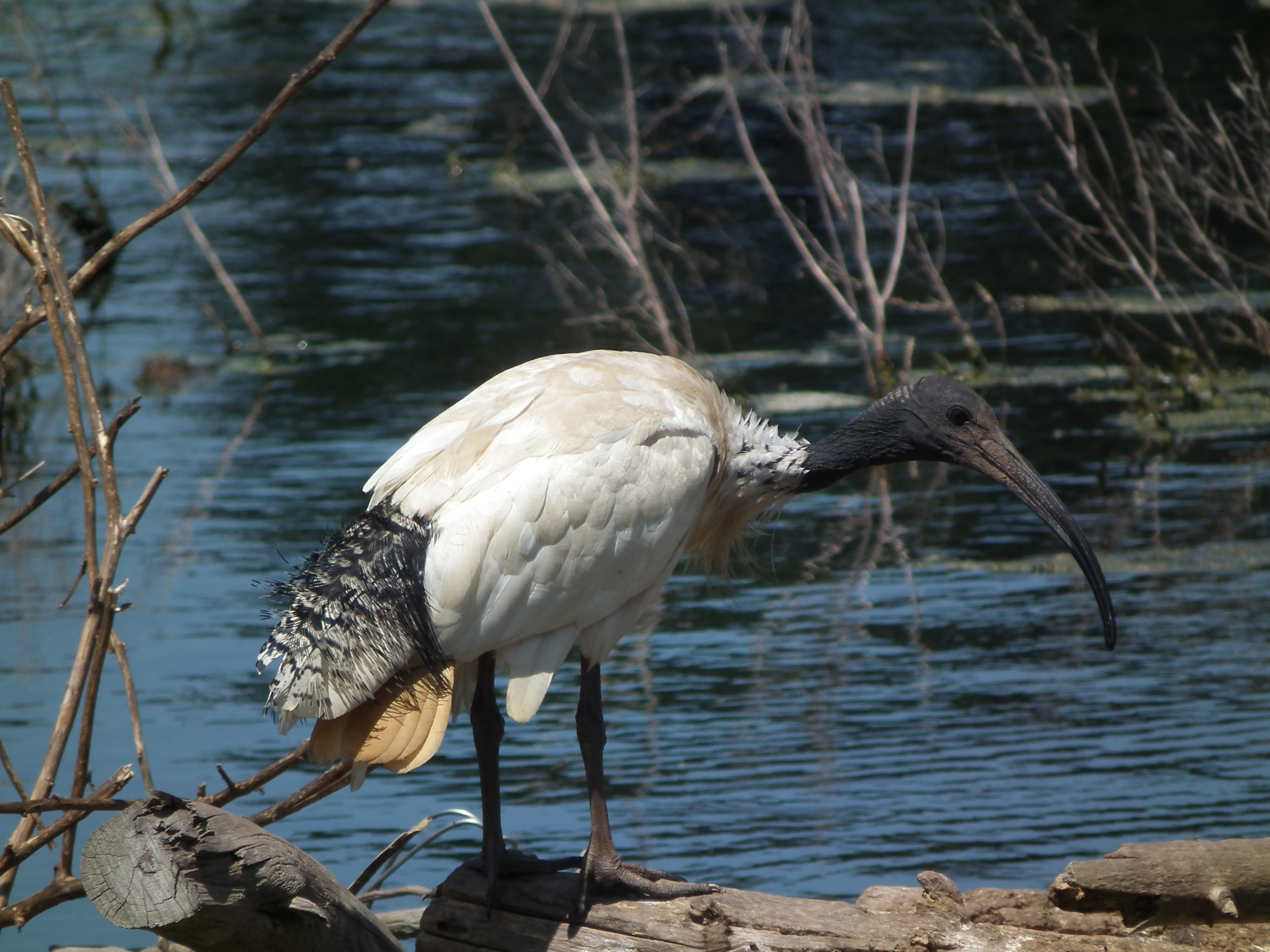
Adult at Coolart Wetlands, Mornington Peninsula, Australia

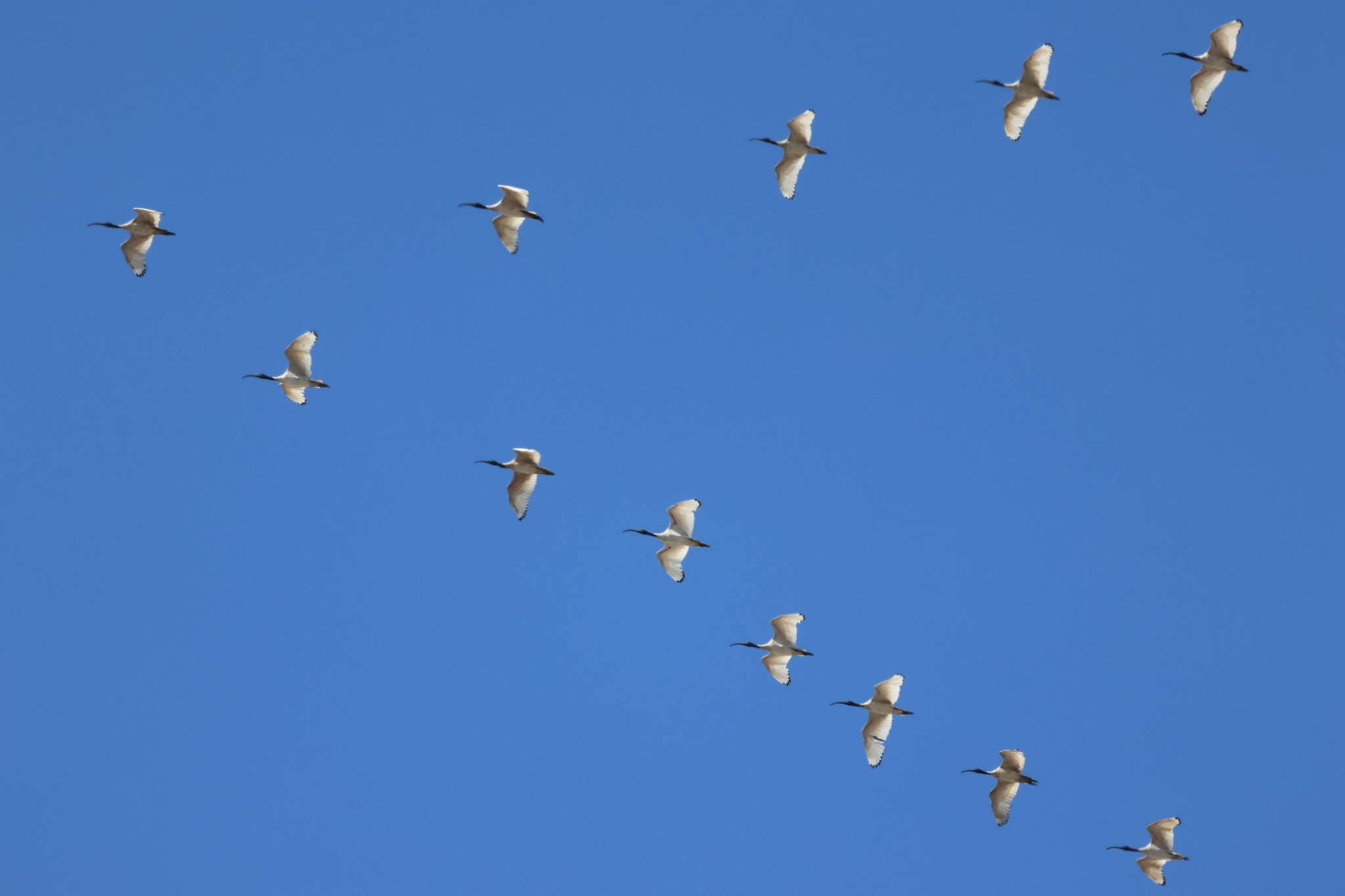
Flying in a V formation

The Australian white ibis is widespread in eastern, northern and south-western Australia. It occurs in marshy wetlands, often near open grasslands and has become common in Australian east-coast city parks and rubbish dumps in the urban areas of Wollongong, Sydney, Perth, the Gold Coast, Brisbane and Townsville. Historically, it was rare in urban areas – the first visits were noted after drought drove birds eastwards in the late 1970s, and there were no breeding records in Sydney until the 1980s.

The Macquarie Marshes in north-western New South Wales used to be one of the main breeding areas of the bird, with 11,000 nests reported in 1998. However, since 2000, none have been reported breeding there. The species is absent from Tasmania.

Populations are known to have boomed, particularly in urban areas, in the 1970s, early 2000s, and around 2010. However, there is no national monitoring of the species, and therefore no official population counts.

=== Urban populations ===
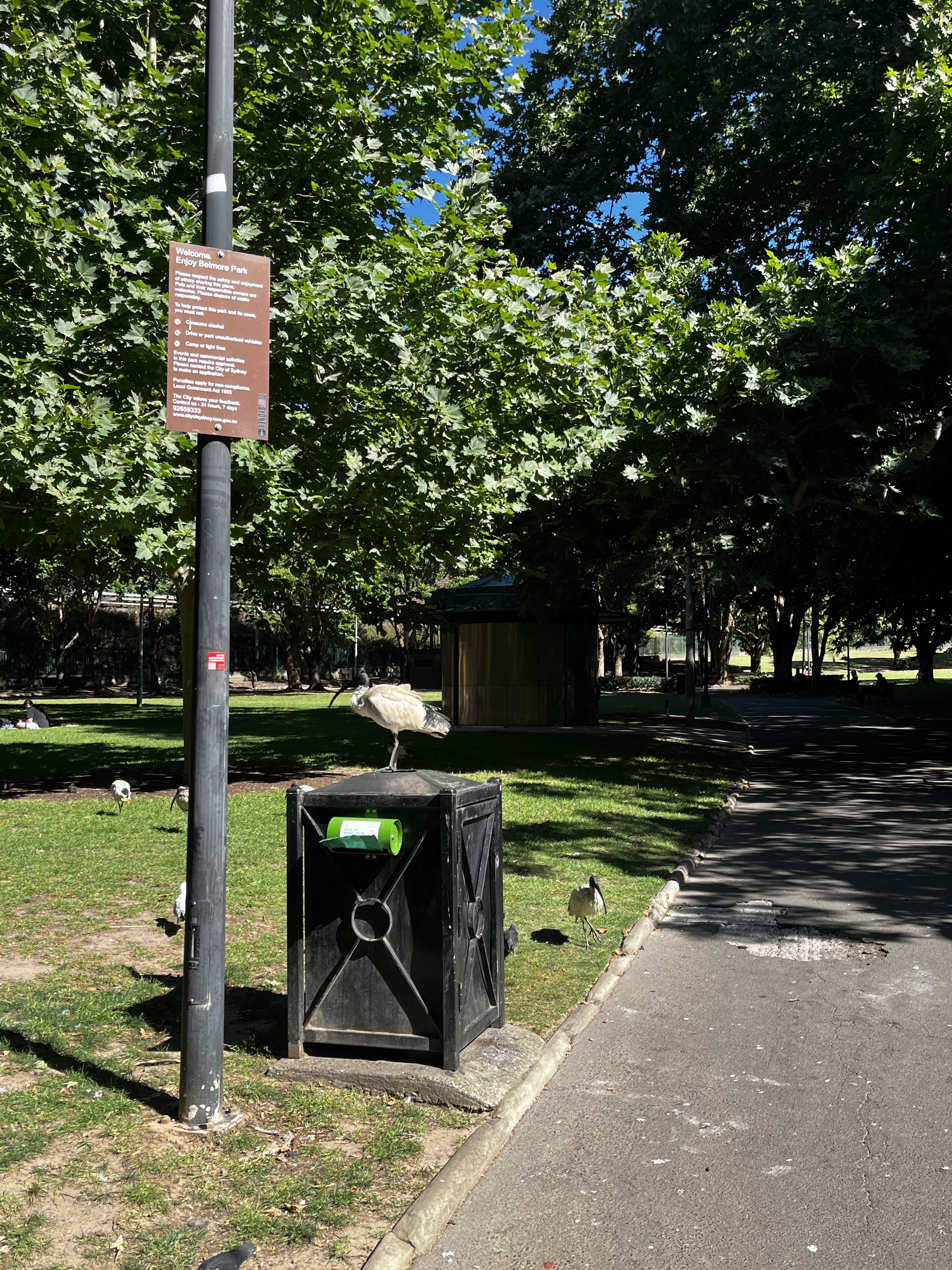
On top of a bin in Belmore Park, Sydney, 2025

The species has been able to colonise urban areas by reducing its fear response when in close proximity to humans, and by significantly widening its suite of food items to include human refuse – strategies that other closely related species such as the straw-necked ibis and the spoonbills have not replicated.

Questions surrounding the origins of recent highly urbanised and closely human-habituated populations of the species are complicated by the establishment of free-flying exhibit flocks of formerly captive birds at a number of zoos and wildlife parks, including Sydney's Taronga Zoo, which first acquired birds for this purpose around 1971. A 1973 ABC TV report noted Taronga's by then well-established "liberty flock" was breeding locally, unlike natural populations, which at that time were only known to fleetingly visit the urban area and not breed there.

The resident Taronga flock nested in exotic Canary Island date palms, and was notably very closely habituated to people; approaching them at close quarters, feeding from rubbish bins and scavenging food from outdoor dining areas. These previously undocumented behaviours became closely associated with the urban Sydney flocks that emerged from around 1980 onwards, directly across the harbour in the Royal Botanic Gardens and the Sydney CBD, and further afield in the Centennial Parklands.

The emergence of urban ibis populations in the wake of the 1970s zoo liberty flock experiment directly mirrors the establishment of the African sacred ibis as a resident species across Europe, with those populations confirmed as originating from free ranging zoo flocks in the same decade.

The relationship between birds originating from the Taronga flock and any influx of inland birds into Sydney is poorly known, but it is speculated that human-habituated flocks originating from the zoo may have encouraged some visiting flocks to stay in Sydney, with the two populations likely merging to some degree. Resident Sydney birds may have influenced newcomers fleeing from inland drought to adapt to new food sources in the city and to accept close proximity to humans.

Other free-flying exhibit populations were similarly established at Healesville Sanctuary in Victoria and at Tidbinbilla in the ACT, both of which mirrored the Taronga example by appearing to serve as population nucleation points. Healesville birds also seeded a free-flying population at Currumbin Wildlife Sanctuary in Queensland.

The urban population further increased after a further period of inland drought in 1998. The birds are an example of wildlife migration caused by climate change. The first big colony set up in the Sydney suburb of Bankstown and started to cause anxiety in the local community. It is estimated the colony was the largest outside the Macquarie Marshes, their natural breeding wetland in inland NSW.

== Behaviour ==
=== Feeding ===
Feeding on a juvenile eel, in Sydney

The Australian white ibis' range of food includes both terrestrial and aquatic invertebrates and human scraps. The most favoured foods are crayfish and mussels, which the bird obtains by digging with its long bill. Ibises have also been observed to eat cane toads by "flicking" them about to make them secrete their defensive toxin, then washing the toad in a nearby water source before consuming it. Researchers called this a learned behaviour "observed in multiple different regions". Although scientists do not think that the toxin affects most birds, they believe birds avoid it because of its "awful" taste.

=== Breeding ===
Breeding season varies with the location within Australia, generally August to November in the south, and February to May, after the wet season, in the north. The nest is a shallow dish-shaped platform of sticks, grasses or reeds, located in trees, generally near a body of water such as a river, swamp or lake. Ibises commonly nest near other waterbirds such as egrets, herons, spoonbills or cormorants. Two to three dull white eggs are laid measuring 65 mm × 44 mm (2.6 in × 1.7 in). The clutch is then incubated for 21–23 days. Hatchlings are altricial, that is, they are naked and helpless at birth, and take 48 days to fledge.

The mating patterns were extensively studied by Lowe, Beilharz and Evans on a wild population at Healesville Sanctuary, where they found that some birds were selecting the same nesting partner within and between years whilst others changed partners regularly. There were also many between-pair copulations.

Mating, in Toowoomba, Queensland

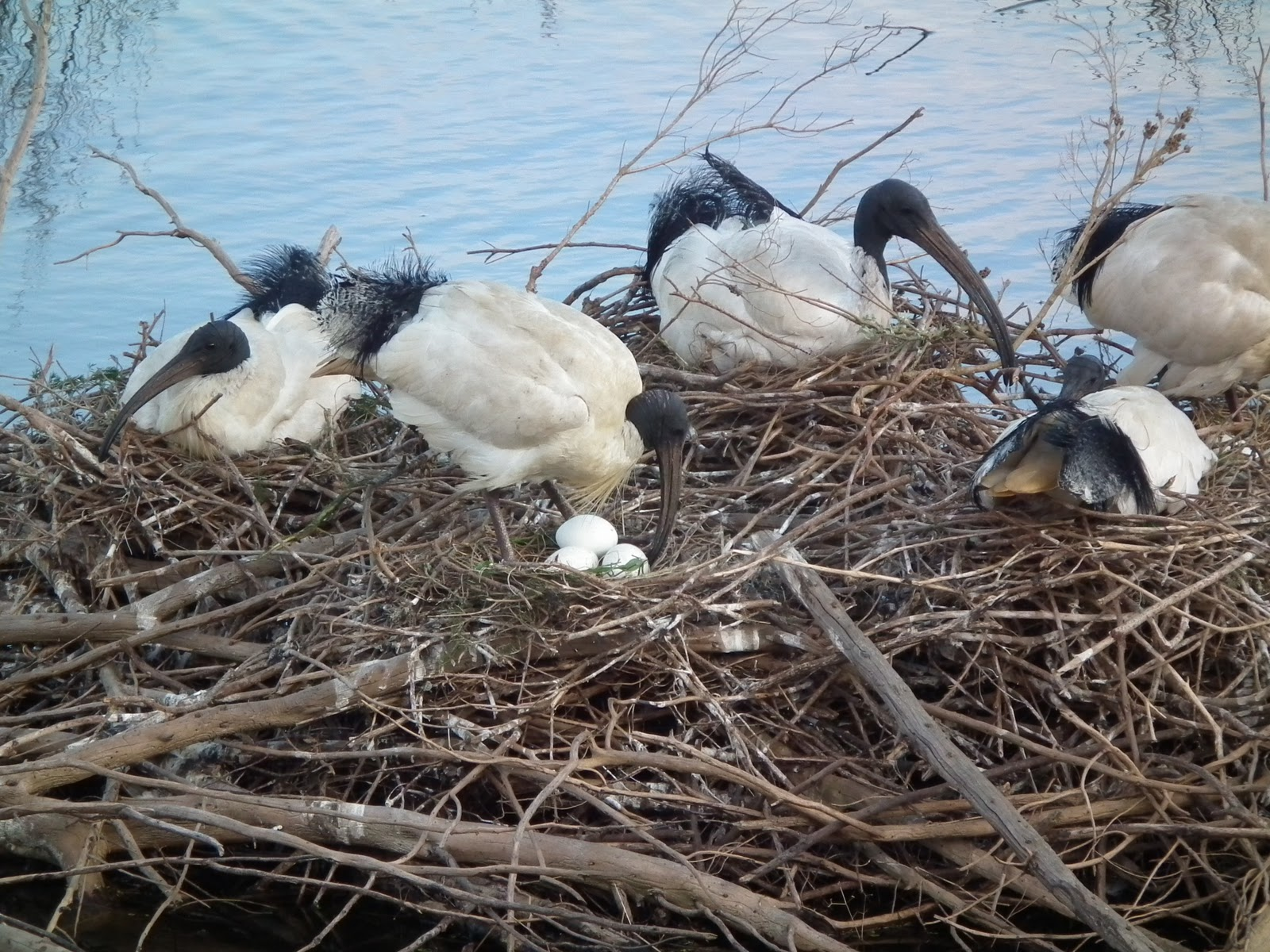
Nesting at Coolart Wetlands, Mornington Peninsula, Australia

Juvenile begging for food, in New South Wales

=== In Solomon Islands ===
The ibis is fairly common and is seen in groups of up to 30 birds along roads, on beaches and in the forest. It also visits villages where it forages with the domestic chickens. It feeds on the ground on invertebrates. When breeding, it nests in small colonies in forest trees and on islands in Lake Tegano.

== In culture ==
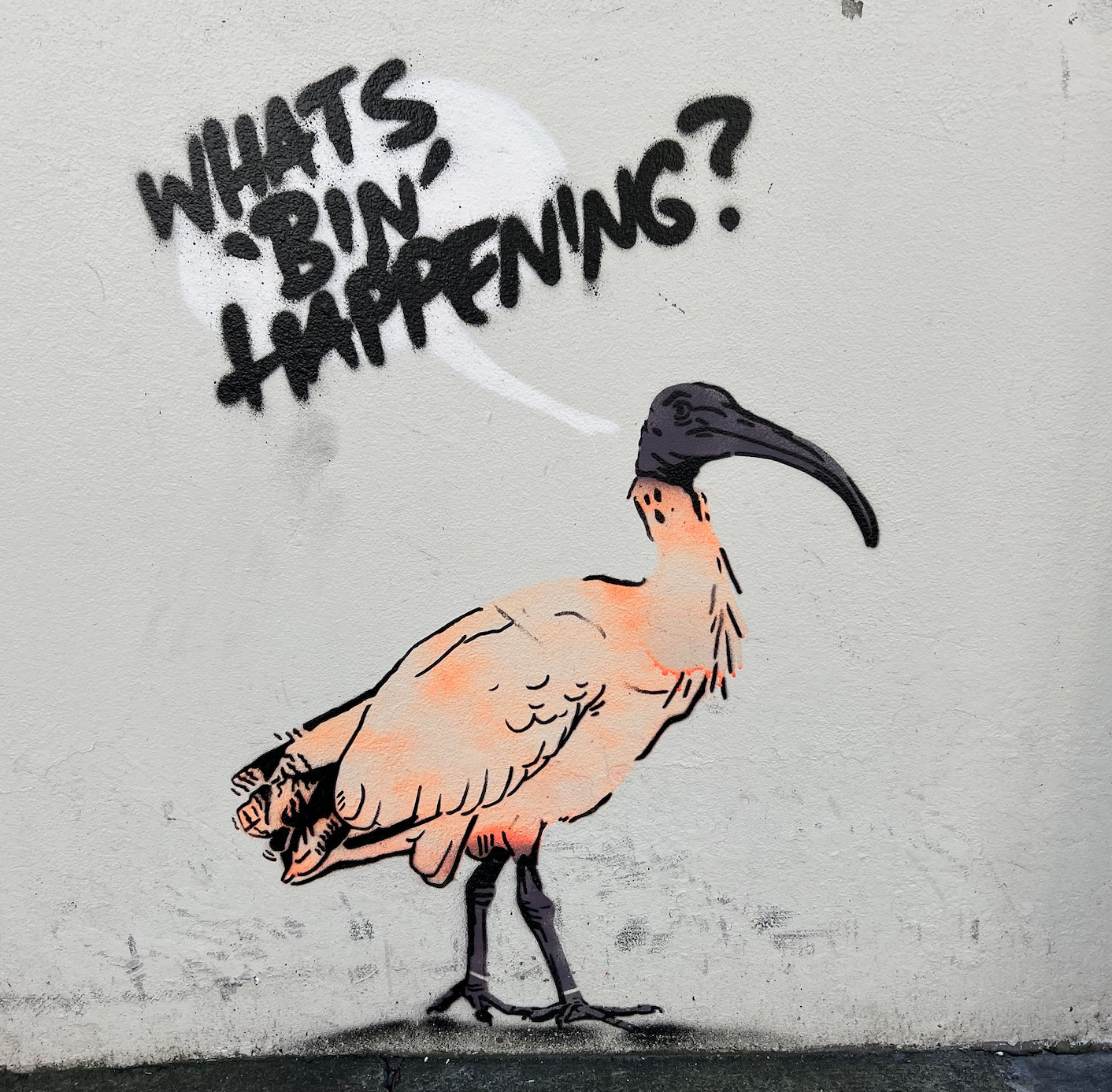
Graffiti art depicting an Australian white ibis in inner western Sydney

The ibis has become a popular symbol of Australian identity, and has been depicted on television, in art, and in online memes. In March 2021, the Macquarie Dictionary blog chose "bin chicken" as an Australian word of the week, and wrote that it was potentially "competing with the kangaroo for the position of most iconic Australian animal".

In 1987 and 1989, respectively, the City of Griffith in the NSW Riverina region and the Municipality of Hunter's Hill on Sydney Harbour, both adopted a coat of arms granted by the College of Arms which feature two ibis birds as supporters.

In December 2017, the ibis placed second in Guardian Australia's inaugural Bird of the Year poll, a nationwide competition for Australia's favourite native bird. The ibis led the poll for much of the voting, but lost to the magpie by 843 votes (19,926 votes to 19,083).

In April 2022, Queensland sports minister Stirling Hinchliffe suggested the ibis as a potential mascot for the 2032 Olympic Games which are scheduled to be held in Brisbane.

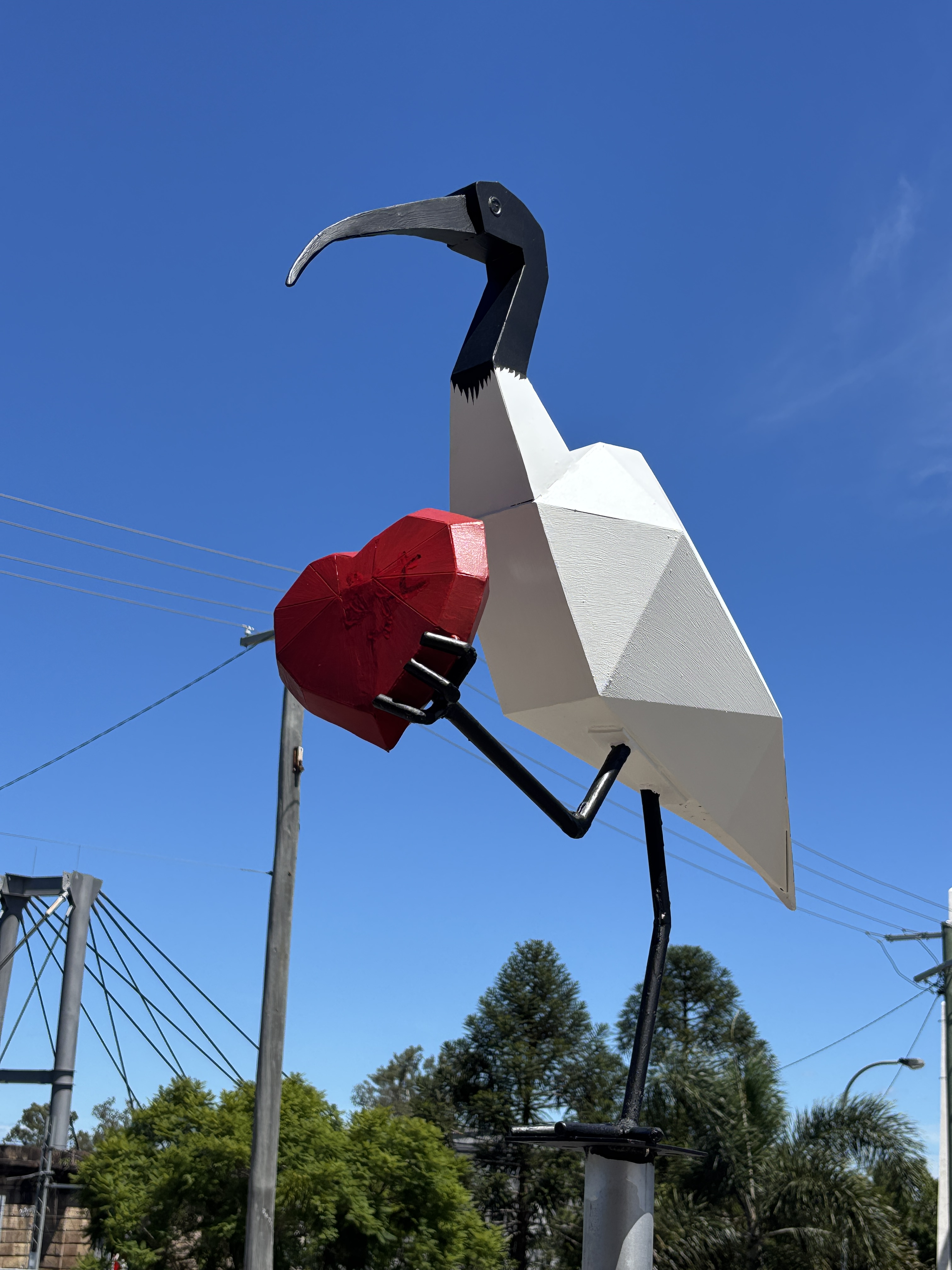
Sculpture of Walter the Bin Chicken at Indooroopilly, named after the Walter Taylor Bridge which is nearby, 2026

In Brisbane, the Bin Chicken Trail is a sculpture trail by local artist Ryan Forster. It consists of a number of sculptures of bin chickens placed in various outdoor settings across Brisbane. Some of the sculputures have been stolen.

== Relationship with humans ==
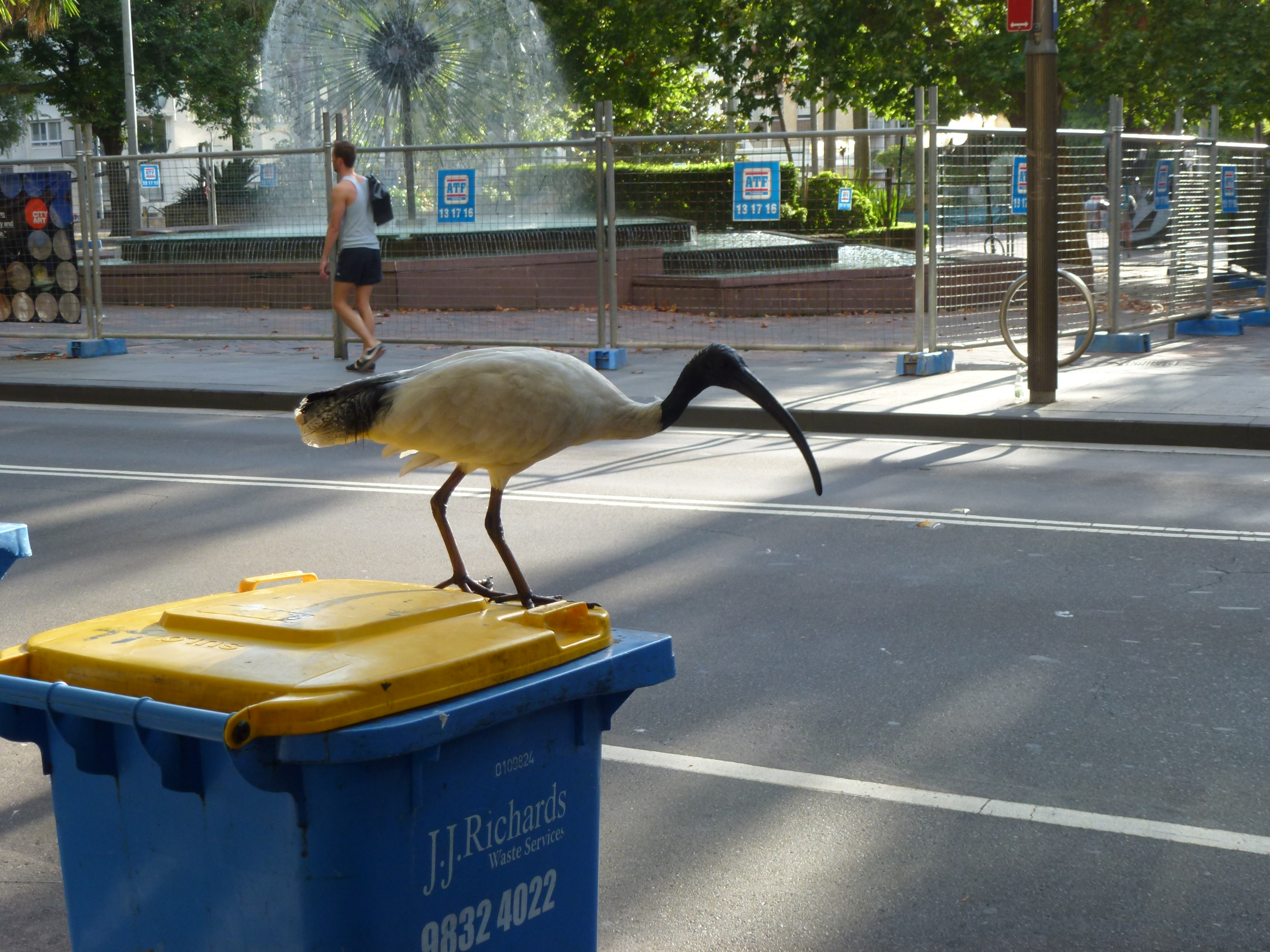
Perching on a wheelie bin in Potts Point, Sydney, 2012

There has been debate in recent years over whether to consider them a pest or a possibly endangered species. Birds in tourist areas of Sydney, such as Darling Harbour, the Royal Botanic Gardens, and Centennial Park, have been a problem due to their strong smell. Populations in the last two areas have been culled.

The birds have also come to be regarded as a problem species in Victoria as a result of their scavenging activities, scattering rubbish from tips and bins in the process, and earning the widespread nickname "bin chicken". They are even known to snatch sandwiches from picnickers. Such behaviour, together with their propensity to build nests in "inappropriate" places, and competition with captive animals, led to surplus birds being relocated from Healesville Sanctuary to Sale. However, the birds returned in a few days.

They are a protected species in Queensland, New South Wales and Victoria.

While the birds can be a nuisance to some people in urban areas, their increased populations do not appear to carry ecological risks.
