= Tameribundy, New South Wales =

Parish in New South Wales, Australia

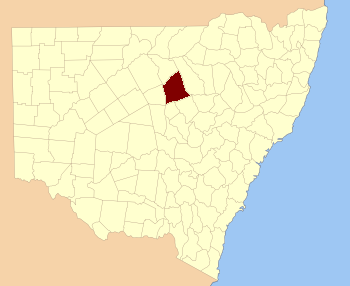
Gregory County

Tameribundy Parish is a civil Parish of Gregory County in New South Wales.
