= Yarrawell, New South Wales =

Yarrawell Parish is a civil parish of Gregory County, New South Wales in Warren Shire located at 31°11'04.0"S 147°39'51.0"E. in New South Wales.
