= Duffity, New South Wales =

Coordinates: 31°11′04.0″S 147°39′59.0″E

Duffity Parish is a civil parish of Gregory County, New South Wales in Warren Shire located at 31°11'04.0"S 147°39'51.0"E. in New South Wales.
