= Macquarie Marshes Nature Reserve =

Protected area in New South Wales, Australia

- IUCN category Ia (strict nature reserve)
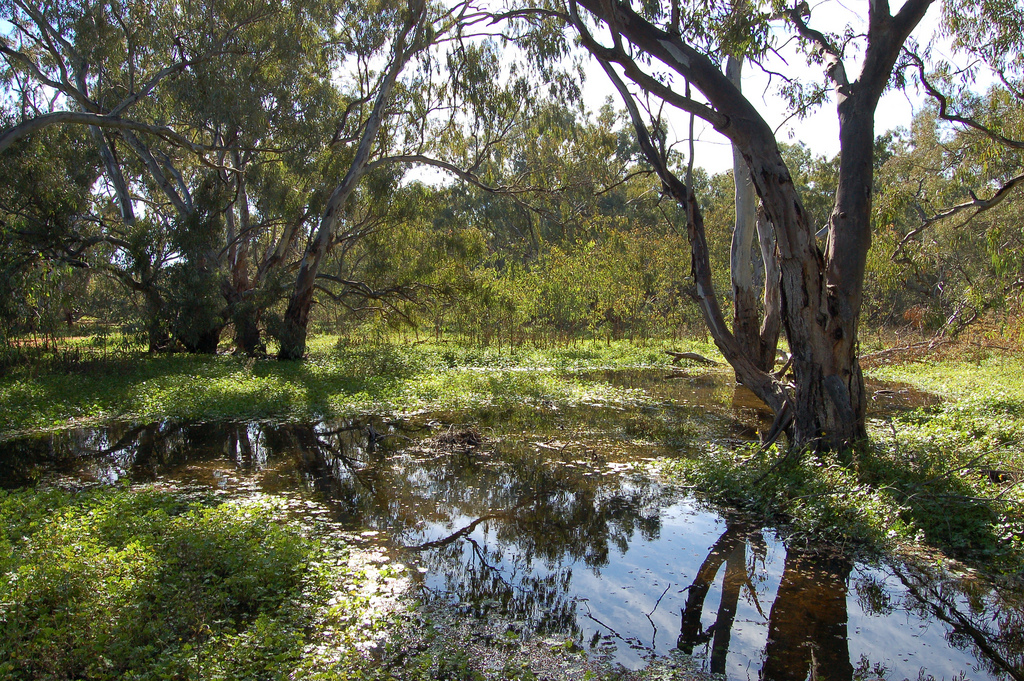
- An image of a healthy marsh in Macquarie Marshes Nature Reserve, taken in 2010

- Location within New South Wales
- Location: New South Wales
- Nearest city: Dubbo
- Coordinates: 30°38′24″S 147°41′31″E
- Area: 198.24 km^{2} (76.54 sq mi)
- Established: January 1971
- Website: Official website

Ramsar Wetland
- Official name: Macquarie Marshes
- Designated: 1 August 1986
- Reference no.: 337

The Macquarie Marshes Nature Reserve is a protected natural wetland reserve that is located within the Macquarie Marshes, in the region along the lower Macquarie River in northwestern New South Wales, Australia. The 19,824-hectare (48,990-acre) reserve is situated approximately 600 kilometres (370 mi) northwest of Sydney and 100 kilometres (62 mi) north of Warren.

The Macquarie Marshes Nature Reserve is the core of the Macquarie Marshes. It is the area most frequently flooded and contains samples of all the habitat types present in the Marshes. Nevertheless, there are large and significant wetland areas outside the nature reserve, including extensive river red gum areas and some of the largest rookeries in the Marshes.

== Natural significance ==
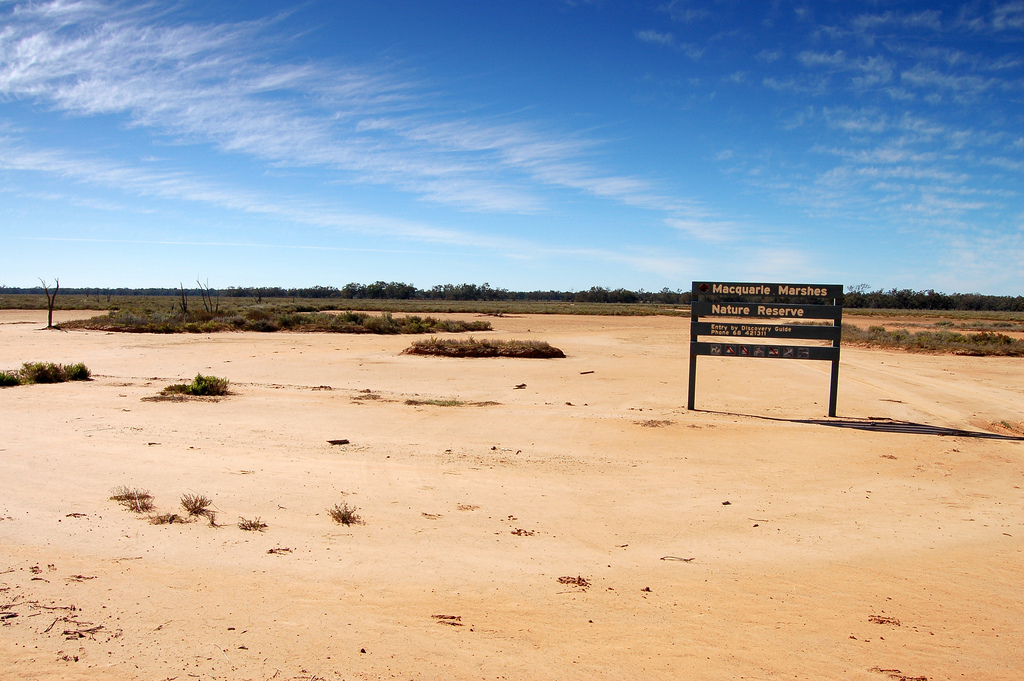
Macquarie Marshes Nature Reserve in July 2008.

The marshes are created by irregular flooding of the flat lands along the river. The nature reserve extends over an area of almost 20,000 hectares (49,000 acres), approximately 10% of the Macquarie Marshes floodplain. It consists of two main reserves, the North and South Marsh, and a third small reserve. The North and South Marsh Nature Reserves were listed as a wetland of international importance in 1986 under the Ramsar Convention of 1971. The Macquarie Marshes are also listed on the Register of the National Estate, the Register of the National Trust of Australia, and the Directory of Important Wetlands in Australia. The reserve is part of the Macquarie Marshes Important Bird Area, identified as such by BirdLife International because of its importance as a breeding site for waterbirds.

=== Flora and fauna ===
The wetlands contain a wide range of vegetation types, primarily determined by the frequency and duration of flooding. The dominant types are river red gum forest and woodland, as well as extensive beds of common reed. Various vegetation associations are found throughout the wetlands, providing habitat for many species of waterbird, as well as other wildlife including 211 bird species, 8 species of native mammal, 15 frog, 56 reptile and 24 native fish species. The wetlands are one of the most important breeding sites in Australia for intermediate egret and straw-necked ibis. A number of birds are listed as vulnerable or threatened including the magpie goose, blue-billed duck, freckled duck, Australasian bittern, brolga, painted snipe, osprey, glossy black cockatoo, turquoise parrot, square-tailed kite and Major Mitchell's cockatoo.

=== Threats ===
The nature reserve covers only a small part of the marsh area. The rest of it is private agricultural holdings, utilised for the grazing of cattle and sheep, and cropping. The frequency and extent of the flooding required to sustain the marshes is threatened by increasing extraction of water from the Macquarie River for crop irrigation upstream from the marshes. An environmental trust has been established in order to attract widespread community support.

== See also ==
- Protected areas of New South Wales
